= List of heads of the Chicago Fire Department =

Head of the Chicago Fire Department
- Incumbent; Annette Nance Holt since 2021
- Inaugural holder: Hirman Hugunin (as "Chief Engineer")
- Formation: 1835 (as "Chief Engineer")

The following is a list of heads of the Chicago Fire Department in Chicago, Illinois United States. This includes heads of the original iteration of Chicago's fire department, a volunteer force which preceded the establishment of the current, professional, fire department in 1858.

Currently the executive of the Chicago Fire Department is referred to as the "fire commissioner". Before this, the head of the department was known as the "chief engineer", and later as the "fire marshal" (or "Fire Marshal and Chief of Brigade").

The current head, holding the position of "fire commissioner", is Annette Nance Holt, appointed by Mayor Lori Lightfoot in 2021.

== History ==
Currently, the head of the Chicago Fire Department is appointed by the mayor of Chicago, and confirmed by the Chicago City Council.

Originally, the leader of the Chicago Fire Department was known as chief engineer. This position was created by an ordinance passed by the then-village of Chicago's board of trustees in November 1835. In December 1835, Chicago's board of trustees appointed its president Hirman Hugunin to be the inaugural occupant of this position. In 1837, when Chicago was incorporated as a city, its charter had the position be one which was elected annually by the city's voters. If an election saw no candidates, thus failing to produce an occupant of the office, the Chicago Common Council (as the Chicago City Council was known as the time) would appoint one. This position originally oversaw a volunteer fire department, until the modern iteration of the Chicago Fire Department was established by city ordinance on August 2, 1858.

By the early twentieth century the department head was styled fire marshal (or Fire Marshal and Chief of Brigade). In 1927 that title was replaced with fire commissioner.

== List of heads of the Chicago Fire Department ==
=== Chief engineers and fire marshals (1835–1927) ===
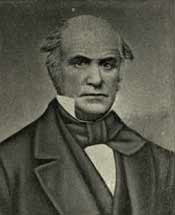
Alexander Loyd

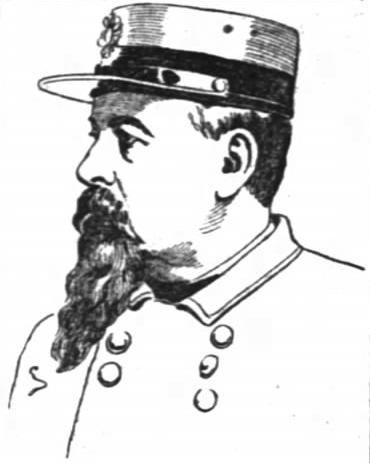
Dennis J. Swenie

Name	Tenure start	Tenure end	Mayor(s) served under	Notes	Ref
Hirman Hugunin	December 1835	February 17, 1836	N/A^{A}		
George E. Snow	February 17, 1836	February 1837	N/A^{A}		
John M. Turner	February 1837	1839	William B. Ogden; Buckner S. Morris		
Alexander Loyd	1839	1839	Benjamin Wright Raymond		
Alvin Calhoun	1839	1840	Benjamin Wright Raymond		
Luther Nichols	1840	1841	Alexander Loyd		
A.S. Sherman	1841	1844	Francis C. Sherman; Benjamin Wright Raymond; Augustus Garrett		
Stephen F. Gale	1844	1847	Alson Sherman; Augustus Garrett; John P. Chapin		
Charles E. Peck (acting)	1847	1849	James Curtiss; James H. Woodworth		
Ashley Gilbert	1849	1850	James H. Woodworth		
Cyrus Parker Bradley	1850	1851	James Curtiss		
	1851	1852	Walter S. Gurnee		
U.P. Harris	1852	1854	Walter S. Gurnee; Charles McNeill Gray		
Cyrus Parker Bradley	1854	1855	Isaac L. Milliken		
Silas McBride	1855	1857	Levi Boone; Thomas Dyer		
Dennis J. Swenie	1858	March 1859	John Wentworth		
Matthais Benner		1879			
Dennis J. Swenie	November 10, 1879	February 16, 1903	Carter Harrison III; John A. Roche; DeWitt C. Cregier; Hempstead Washburne; Carter Harrison III; George Bell Swift (interim); John P. Hopkins; George Bell Swift; Carter Harrison Jr.		
William H. Musham	1901	October 1904	Carter Harrison Jr.	Fire marshal; resigned	
John Campion	October 1904	1906	Carter Harrison Jr. Edward Dunne	Fire marshal	
James J. Horan	1906	December 22, 1910	Edward Dunne; Fred Busse	Fire Marshal and Chief of Brigade; killed at the Chicago Union Stock Yards fire (1910)	
Charles Seyferlich	December 1910		Fred Busse	Fire marshal; succeeded Horan after the Stock Yards fire	

=== Fire Commissioners (1927–present) ===
Name	Tenure start	Tenure end	Mayor(s) served under	Notes	Ref
Albert Goodrich	1927	1931	William Hale Thompson; Anton Cermak		
Edward A. Maloney (acting)	1931	August 15, 1931	Anton Cermak		
Daniel J. Carmody (acting)	August 15, 1931	September 1931	Anton Cermak	Died in office	
Michael J. Corrigan	1937	March 16, 1955	Edward Joseph Kelly; Martin H. Kennelly		
Anthony J. Mullaney	April 16, 1955	1957	Edward Joseph Kelly; Richard J. Daley		
Robert J. Quinn	March 1957	1978	Richard J. Daley; Michael Bilandic		
Richard Albrecht	1978	August 1980	Michael Bilandic; Jane Byrne		
Charles Pierce (acting)	August 1980	September 1980	Jane Byrne		
William R. Blair	September 1980	August 1983	Jane Byrne; Harold Washington		
Louis T. Galante	August 1983	May 10, 1989	Harold Washington; David Orr (acting); Eugene Sawyer; Richard M. Daley		
Raymond E. Orozco	May 10, 1989	November 1996	Richard M. Daley		
Edward P. Altman	1996	October 15, 1999	Richard M. Daley		
James Joyce	December 15, 1999	April 30, 2004	Richard M. Daley		
Cortez Trotter	2004	2006	Richard M. Daley		
Raymond E. Orozco Jr.	May 2006	June 2010	Richard M. Daley		
Robert Hoff	June 2010	February 16, 2012	Richard M. Daley; Rahm Emanuel		
Jose Santiago	April 18, 2012	August 31, 2018	Rahm Emanuel		
Richard C. Ford II	September 1, 2018	April 2021	Rahm Emanuel; Lori Lightfoot	Served as acting commissioner from September 1, 2018 until being confirmed by the Chicago City Council to permanently hold the position on November 14, 2018	
Annette Nance Holt	2021	incumbent	Lori Lightfoot; Brandon Johnson	Initially performed as acting fire commissioner. Was confirmed as permanent fire commissioner by the Chicago City Council on June 23, 2021	

== Notes ==
^A Hirman Hugunin and George E Snow's tenures predate the incorporation of Chicago as a city. While no mayor was serving at the time they were High Constable, John H. Kinzie was Town President

== See also ==
- List of heads of the Chicago Police Department
- Fire chief
