= Mayor of Chicago =

Elected chief executive of city government

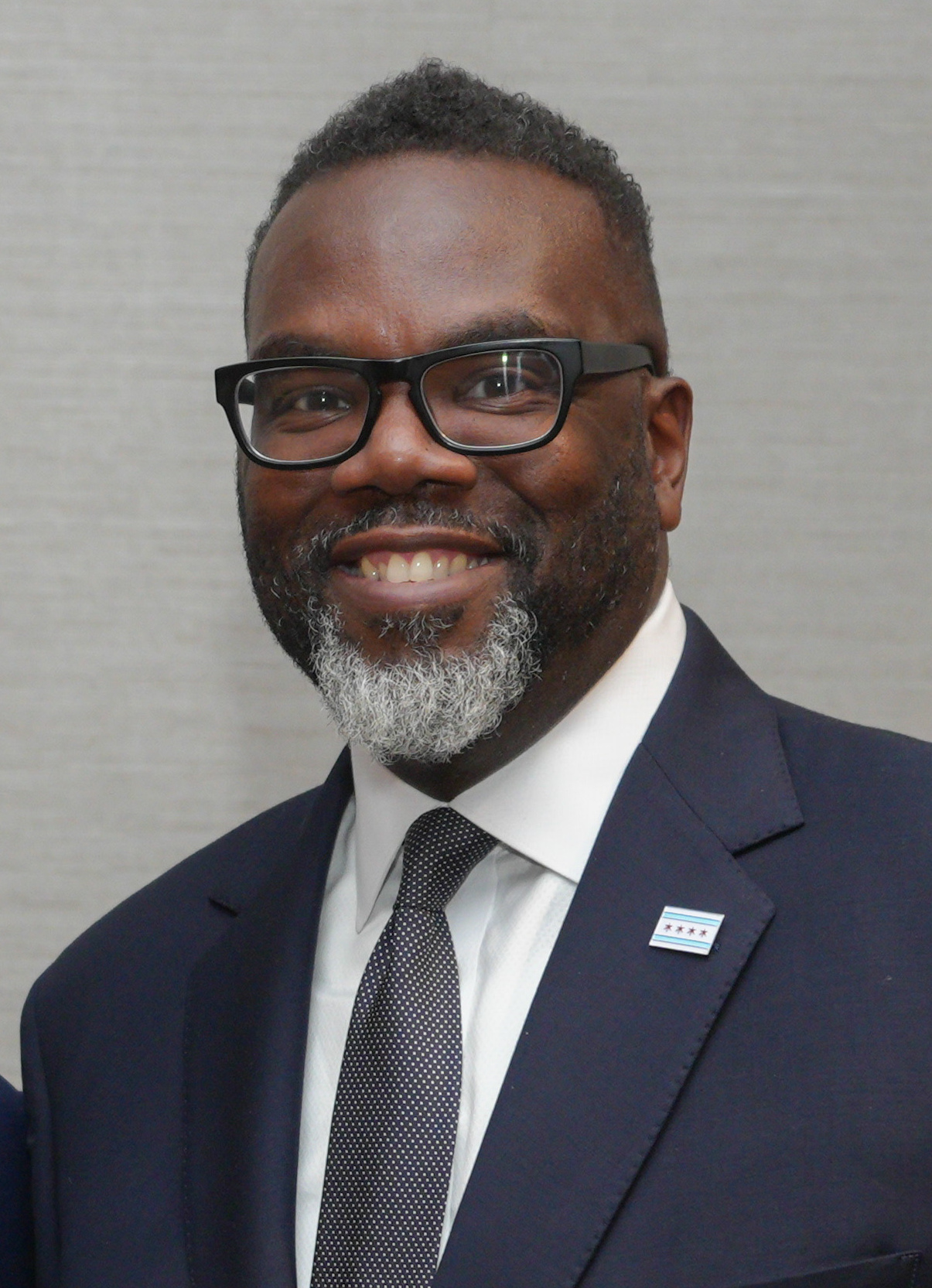
- Incumbent; Brandon Johnson since May 15, 2023
- Government of Chicago
- Style: His Honor; The Honorable
- Term length: 4 years
- Inaugural holder: William B. Ogden
- Formation: 1837
- Succession: Vice mayor of Chicago
- Salary: $216,210
- Website: Official website

The mayor of Chicago is the chief executive of city government in Chicago, Illinois, the third-largest city in the United States. The mayor is responsible for the administration and management of various city departments. In addition, the Mayor submits proposals and recommendations to the Chicago City Council, is active in the enforcement of the city's ordinances, submits the city's annual budget and appoints city officers, department commissioners or directors, and members of city boards and commissions.

During sessions of the city council, the mayor serves as the presiding officer. The mayor is not allowed to vote on issues except in certain instances, most notably where the vote taken on a matter before the body results in a tie.

The office of mayor was created when Chicago became a city in 1837.

== History ==
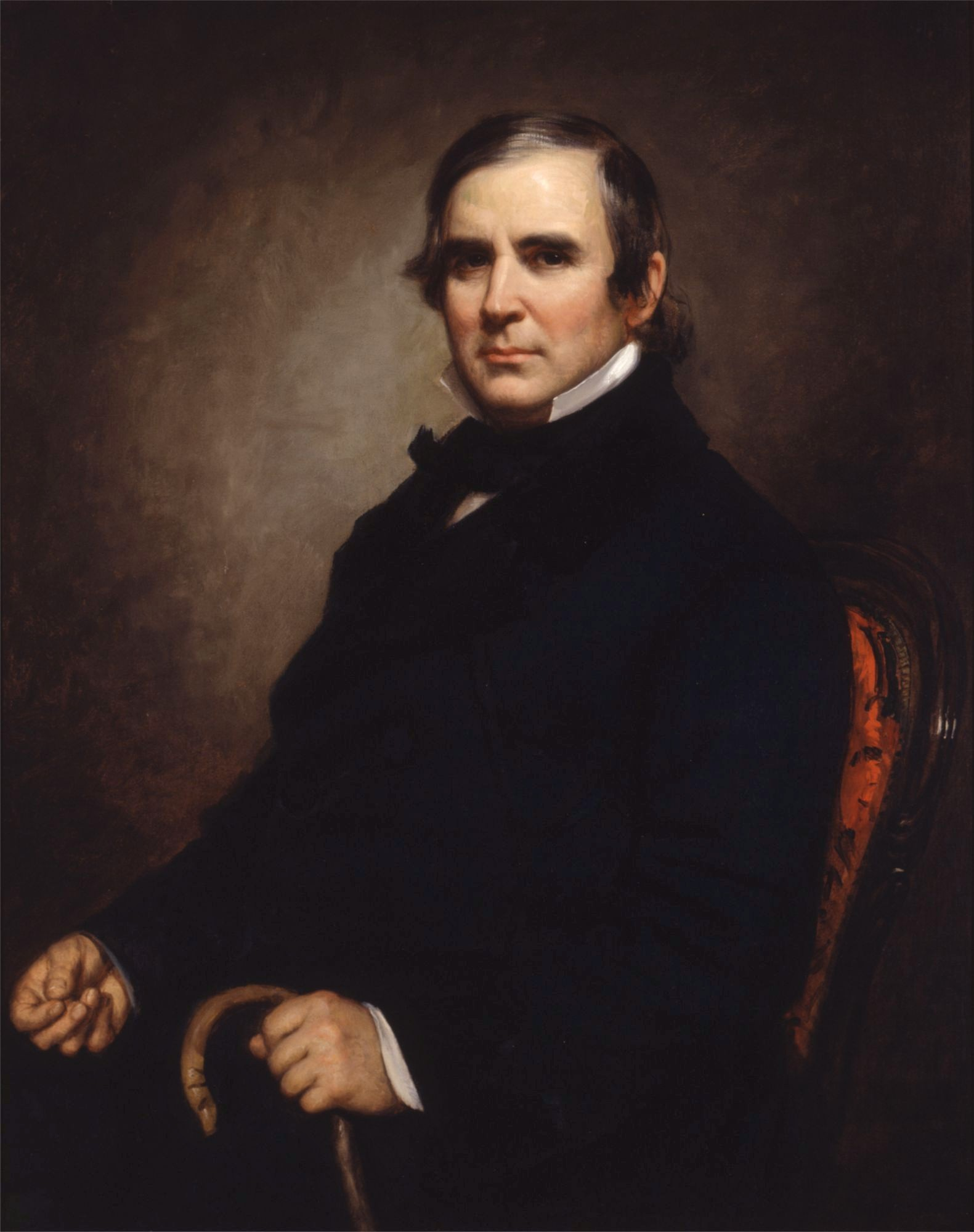
William B. Ogden was the first mayor of Chicago.

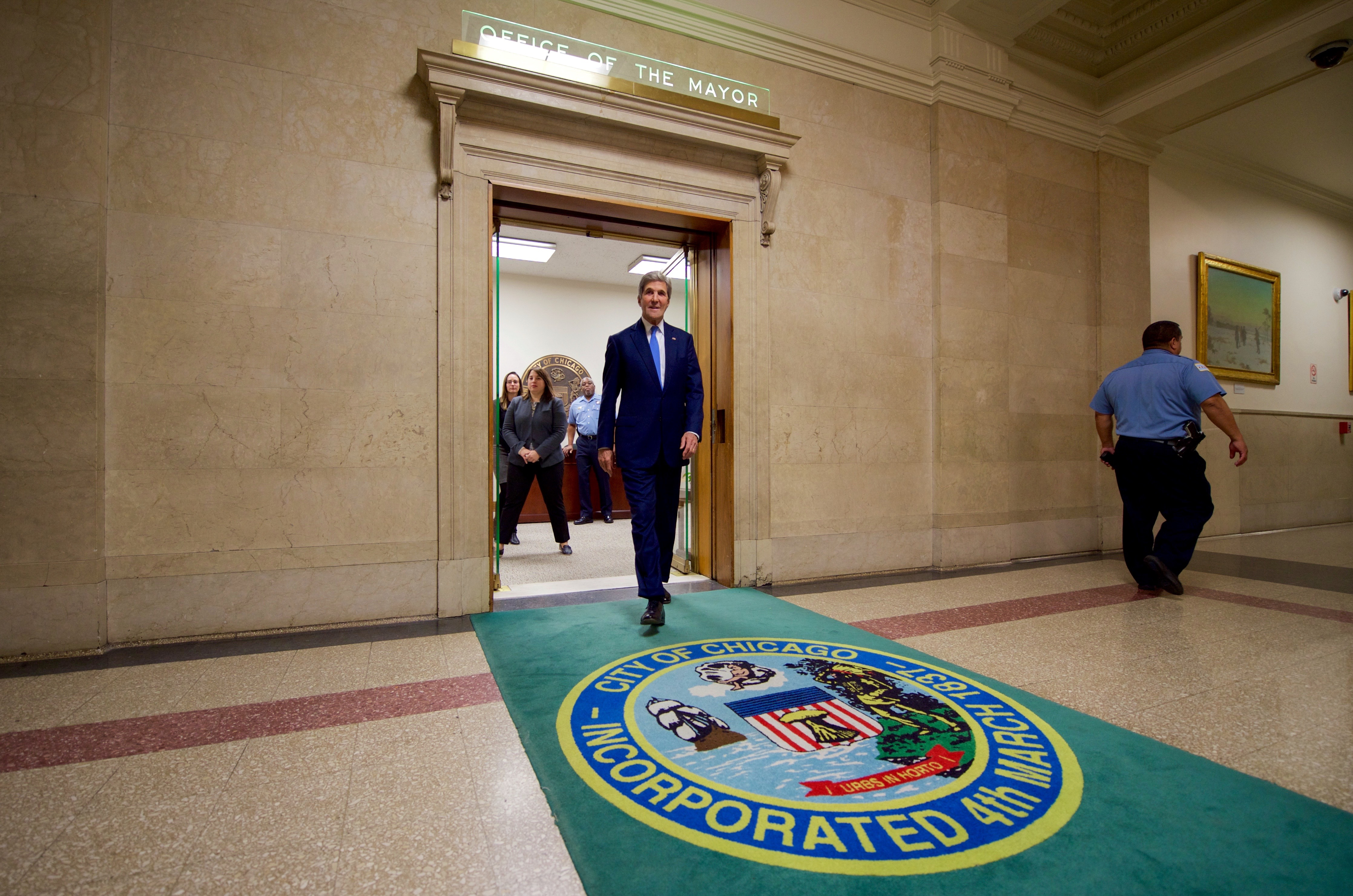
U.S. Secretary of State John Kerry leaving "The Fifth Floor" office of the mayor in 2016

The first mayor was William B. Ogden (1837–1838). Forty-six men and two women (Jane Byrne, 1979–1983, and Lori Lightfoot, 2019–2023), have held the office. Two sets of father and son have been elected Mayor of Chicago: Carter Harrison III (1879–1887, 1893) and Carter Harrison IV (1897–1905, 1911–1915), as well as Richard J. Daley (1955–1976) and Richard M. Daley (1989–2011). Carter Harrison IV was the first mayor to have been born in the city.

As an interim mayor, David Duvall Orr (1987) held the office for one week, the shortest time period. Richard M. Daley was elected six times becoming Chicago's longest-serving mayor, his 22 years surpassing his father's record of 21 years.

The first Irish Catholic mayor was John Patrick Hopkins (1893–1895), and Rahm Emanuel (2011–2019) is the only Jewish American to have served as mayor.

Harold Washington (1983–1987) was the first African American mayor. Lightfoot (2019–2023) was the city's first African American woman and first LGBT mayor. Brandon Johnson (2023–present) is the fourth African American mayor, Eugene Sawyer (1987–1989) having been selected by the council after Washington died in office.

== Appointment powers ==
The mayor appoints the commissioner of the Chicago Fire Department, the superintendent of the Chicago Police Department and the heads of other departments, the largest of which are the Water Management Department (formed by the consolidation of the former Water Department and Sewer Department under Richard M. Daley), and the Streets & Sanitation Department. The mayor also appoints members to the boards of several special-purpose governmental bodies including City Colleges of Chicago, Chicago Park District, Chicago Public Library, Chicago Housing Authority, Chicago Transit Authority, and the Metropolitan Pier and Exposition Authority. Under Richard M. Daley, the Illinois legislature granted the mayor power to appoint the governing board and chief executive officer of the Chicago Public Schools and subordinated the district to the mayor; the district had long been an independent unit of government.

The Chicago City Clerk and City Treasurer of Chicago are elected separately, as are the 50 alderpersons who form the city council. The mayor is empowered, however, to fill vacancies in any of these 52 elected offices by appointment. In turn, the city council elects one of its own to fill a mayoral vacancy.

By charter, Chicago has a "weak-mayor" system, in which most of the power is vested in the city council. In practice, however, the mayor of Chicago has long been one of the most powerful municipal chief executives in the nation. Unlike in most other weak-mayor systems, the mayor has the power to draw up the budget. For most of the 20th century, before the decline of patronage and the mayor's office becoming officially non-partisan in 1999, the mayor was the de facto leader of the city's Democratic Party, and had great influence over the ward organizations. Located in City Hall, "the fifth floor" is sometimes used as a metonym for the office and power of the mayor.

== Election and succession ==
The mayor of Chicago is elected by popular vote every four years, on the last Tuesday in February. A run-off election, in case no candidate garners more than fifty percent of the vote, is held on the first Tuesday in April. The election is held on a non-partisan basis. Chicago is the largest city in the United States not to limit the term of service for its mayor.

In accordance with Illinois law, the city council elects a vice mayor who serves as interim mayor in the event of a vacancy in the office of the mayor or the inability of the mayor to serve due to illness or injury, until the city council elects one of its members acting mayor or until the mayoral term expires. However, if a vacancy occurs in the office of mayor with more than 28 months remaining in the mayoral term and at least 130 days before the next general municipal election, then a special election must be held to choose a new mayor to serve out the remainder of the term at that general municipal election; if a vacancy occurs with fewer than 28 months remaining in the mayoral term or fewer than 130 days before the next general municipal election, then the acting mayor serves as mayor until the mayoral term expires.

The order of succession involving the vice mayor was made concrete following disputes that arose in the aftermath of the death in office of Richard J. Daley, and was subsequently implemented following the death in office of Harold Washington, which saw Vice Mayor David Orr become acting mayor. Prior to this, the city had vague succession laws which indicated that the president pro tempore of the City Council would succeed as mayor. This was not followed after the death of Daley, and the city council appointed Michael Bilandic acting mayor instead of having pro tempore Wilson Frost become mayor, due to City Corporation Counsel William R. Quinlan ruling that, since the city did not have a statute specifically outlining succession, the City Council would need to elect the interim mayor.

Six instances have seen the City Council appoint either an acting mayor, acting mayor pro tempore, or interim mayor.

In the absence of the mayor during meetings of the city council, the president pro tempore of the city council, who is a member of and elected by the city council, acts as presiding officer. Unlike the mayor, the president pro tempore can vote on all legislative matters. If neither the mayor nor pro tempore can preside, the vice mayor presides.

== List of mayors ==
Between 1833 and 1837, Chicago was incorporated as a town and headed by town presidents. Since 1837, it has been incorporated as a city and headed by mayors.

The mayoral term in Chicago was one year from 1837 through 1863, when it was changed to two years. In 1907, it was changed again, this time to four years. Until 1861, municipal elections were held in March. In that year, legislation moved them to April. In 1869, however, election day was changed to November, and terms expiring in April of that year were changed. In 1875, election day was moved back to April by the city's vote to operate under the Cities and Villages Act of 1872.

No.	Mayor	Took office	Left office	Tenure	Election	Party	Vice Mayor
Town Presidents
1	Thomas Jefferson Vance Owen (1801–1835)	August 12, 1833	August 11, 1834	364 days	–	Nonpartisan	Position not yet established
2	John H. Kinzie (1803–1865)	1834	May 1837	3 years	–	Whig	Position not yet established
Mayors
1	William B. Ogden (1805–1877)	May 1837	March 1838	10 months	1837	Democratic	Position not yet established
2	Buckner Stith Morris (1800–1879)	1838	1839	1 year	1838	Whig	Position not yet established
3	Benjamin Wright Raymond (1801–1883); 1st time	1839	1840	1 year	1839	Whig	Position not yet established
4	Alexander Loyd (1805–1872)	March 9, 1840	March 4, 1841	360 days	1840	Democratic	Position not yet established
5	Francis Cornwall Sherman (1805–1870); 1st time	March 4, 1841	March 7, 1842	1 year, 3 days	1841	Democratic	Position not yet established
6	Benjamin Wright Raymond (1801–1883); 2nd time	March 7, 1842	March 7, 1843	1 year, 0 days	1842	Whig	Position not yet established
7	Augustus Garrett (1801–1848); 1st time	March 7, 1843	April 2, 1844	1 year, 26 days	1843	Democratic	Position not yet established
7	Augustus Garrett (1801–1848); 1st time	March 7, 1843	April 2, 1844	1 year, 26 days	~~March~~; ~~1844~~ (Note: The March 1844 mayoral election was voided by the Common Council on the grounds that clerks in wards had been unqualified to vote. See here for more information.)	Democratic	Position not yet established
8	Alson Sherman (1811–1903)	April 2, 1844	March 10, 1845	342 days	April; 1844	Independent Democratic	Position not yet established
9	Augustus Garrett (1801–1848); 2nd time	March 10, 1845	March 3, 1846	358 days	1845	Democratic	Position not yet established
10	John Putnam Chapin (1810–1864)	March 3, 1846	March 9, 1847	1 year, 6 days	1846	Whig	Position not yet established
11	James Curtiss (1806–1859); 1st time	March 9, 1847	March 14, 1848	1 year, 5 days	1847	Democratic	Position not yet established
12	James Hutchinson Woodworth (1804–1869)	March 14, 1848	March 12, 1850	1 year, 363 days	1848	Independent Democratic	Position not yet established
12	James Hutchinson Woodworth (1804–1869)	March 14, 1848	March 12, 1850	1 year, 363 days	1849	Independent Democratic	Position not yet established
13	James Curtiss (1806–1859); 2nd time	March 12, 1850	March 11, 1851	364 days	1850	Democratic	Position not yet established
14	Walter S. Gurnee (1813–1903)	March 11, 1851	March 7, 1853	1 year, 361 days	1851	Democratic	Position not yet established
14	Walter S. Gurnee (1813–1903)	March 11, 1851	March 7, 1853	1 year, 361 days	1852	Democratic	Position not yet established
15	Charles McNeill Gray (1807–1885)	March 7, 1853	March 15, 1854	1 year, 8 days	1853	Democratic	Position not yet established
16	Isaac Lawrence Milliken (1813–1889)	March 15, 1854	March 13, 1855	363 days	1854	Democratic	Position not yet established
17	Levi Boone (1808–1882)	March 13, 1855	March 11, 1856	364 days	1855	American	Position not yet established
18	Thomas Dyer (1805–1862)	March 11, 1856	March 10, 1857	364 days	1856	Democratic	Position not yet established
19	John Wentworth (1815–1888); 1st time	March 10, 1857	March 2, 1858	357 days	1857	Republican	Position not yet established
20	John Charles Haines (1818–1896)	March 2, 1858	March 22, 1860	2 years, 20 days	1858	Republican	Position not yet established
20	John Charles Haines (1818–1896)	March 2, 1858	March 22, 1860	2 years, 20 days	1859	Republican	Position not yet established
21	John Wentworth (1815–1888); 2nd time	March 22, 1860	May 6, 1861	1 year, 45 days	1860	Democratic	Position not yet established
22	Julian Sidney Rumsey (1823–1886)	May 6, 1861	May 5, 1862	364 days	1861	Republican	Position not yet established
23	Francis Cornwall Sherman (1805–1870); 2nd time	May 5, 1862	May 3, 1865	2 years, 363 days	1862	Democratic	Position not yet established
23	Francis Cornwall Sherman (1805–1870); 2nd time	May 5, 1862	May 3, 1865	2 years, 363 days	1863	Democratic	Position not yet established
24	John Blake Rice (1809–1874)	May 3, 1865	December 6, 1869	4 years, 217 days	1865	Republican	Position not yet established
24	John Blake Rice (1809–1874)	May 3, 1865	December 6, 1869	4 years, 217 days	1867	Republican	Position not yet established
25	Roswell B. Mason (1805–1892)	December 6, 1869	December 4, 1871	1 year, 363 days	1869	Citizens	Position not yet established
26	Joseph Medill (1823–1899)	December 4, 1871	August 22, 1873	1 year, 261 days	1871	Republican (Dry)	Position not yet established
–	Lester L. Bond (1829–1903); Acting	August 22, 1873	December 1, 1873	101 days	–	Republican	Position not yet established
27	Harvey Doolittle Colvin (1815–1892)	December 1, 1873	July 24, 1876	2 years, 236 days	1873	People's	Position not yet established
–	Thomas Hoyne (1817–1883); Disputed	Election invalidated; tenure annulled			~~April~~; ~~1876~~ (Note: The April 1876 mayoral election (and thus Hoyne's tenure as mayor) was annulled after it was ruled by the Circuit Court of Cook County that the election had been illegitimate. See here and here for more information.)	Independent Democratic	Position not yet established
28	Monroe Heath (1827–1894)	July 24, 1876	April 28, 1879	2 years, 278 days	July; 1876	Republican	Position not yet established
28	Monroe Heath (1827–1894)	July 24, 1876	April 28, 1879	2 years, 278 days	1877	Republican	Position not yet established
29	Carter Harrison III (1825–1893); 1st time	April 28, 1879	April 18, 1887	7 years, 355 days	1879	Democratic	Position not yet established
29	Carter Harrison III (1825–1893); 1st time	April 28, 1879	April 18, 1887	7 years, 355 days	1881	Democratic	Position not yet established
29	Carter Harrison III (1825–1893); 1st time	April 28, 1879	April 18, 1887	7 years, 355 days	1883	Democratic	Position not yet established
29	Carter Harrison III (1825–1893); 1st time	April 28, 1879	April 18, 1887	7 years, 355 days	1885	Democratic	Position not yet established
30	John A. Roche (1844–1904)	April 18, 1887	April 15, 1889	1 year, 362 days	1887	Republican	Position not yet established
31	DeWitt Clinton Cregier (1829–1898)	April 15, 1889	April 27, 1891	2 years, 12 days	1889	Democratic	Position not yet established
32	Hempstead Washburne (1851–1918)	April 27, 1891	April 17, 1893	1 year, 355 days	1891	Republican	Position not yet established
33	Carter Harrison III (1825–1893); 2nd time	April 17, 1893	October 28, 1893^{[†]}	194 days	1893	Democratic	Position not yet established
34	George Bell Swift (1845–1912); Pro tempore 1st time	November 9, 1893	December 27, 1893	48 days	–	Republican	Position not yet established
35	John Patrick Hopkins (1858–1918)	December 27, 1893	April 8, 1895	1 year, 102 days	1893 special	Democratic	Position not yet established
36	George Bell Swift (1845–1912); 2nd time	April 8, 1895	April 15, 1897	2 years, 7 days	1895	Republican	Position not yet established
37	Carter Harrison IV (1860–1953); 1st time	April 15, 1897	April 10, 1905	7 years, 360 days	1897	Democratic	Position not yet established
37	Carter Harrison IV (1860–1953); 1st time	April 15, 1897	April 10, 1905	7 years, 360 days	1899	Democratic	Position not yet established
37	Carter Harrison IV (1860–1953); 1st time	April 15, 1897	April 10, 1905	7 years, 360 days	1901	Democratic	Position not yet established
37	Carter Harrison IV (1860–1953); 1st time	April 15, 1897	April 10, 1905	7 years, 360 days	1903	Democratic	Position not yet established
38	Edward Fitzsimmons Dunne (1853–1937)	April 10, 1905	April 15, 1907	2 years, 5 days	1905	Democratic	Position not yet established
39	Fred A. Busse (1866–1914)	April 15, 1907	April 17, 1911	4 years, 2 days	1907	Republican	Position not yet established
40	Carter Harrison IV (1860–1953); 2nd time	April 17, 1911	April 26, 1915	4 years, 9 days	1911	Democratic	Position not yet established
41	William Hale Thompson (1869–1944); 1st time	April 26, 1915	April 16, 1923	7 years, 355 days	1915	Republican	Position not yet established
41	William Hale Thompson (1869–1944); 1st time	April 26, 1915	April 16, 1923	7 years, 355 days	1919	Republican	Position not yet established
42	William Emmett Dever (1862–1929)	April 16, 1923	April 18, 1927	4 years, 2 days	1923	Democratic	Position not yet established
43	William Hale Thompson (1869–1944); 2nd time Campaign	April 18, 1927	April 9, 1931	3 years, 356 days	1927	Republican	Position not yet established
44	Anton Cermak (1873–1933)	April 9, 1931	March 6, 1933^{[†]}	1 year, 331 days	1931	Democratic	Position not yet established
45	Frank J. Corr (1877–1934); Acting	March 15, 1933	April 8, 1933	24 days	–	Democratic	Position not yet established
46	Edward Joseph Kelly (1876–1950)	April 17, 1933	April 15, 1947	13 years, 363 days	App.	Democratic	Position not yet established
46	Edward Joseph Kelly (1876–1950)	April 17, 1933	April 15, 1947	13 years, 363 days	1935	Democratic	Position not yet established
46	Edward Joseph Kelly (1876–1950)	April 17, 1933	April 15, 1947	13 years, 363 days	1939	Democratic	Position not yet established
46	Edward Joseph Kelly (1876–1950)	April 17, 1933	April 15, 1947	13 years, 363 days	1943	Democratic	Position not yet established
47	Martin H. Kennelly (1887–1961)	April 15, 1947	April 20, 1955	8 years, 5 days	1947	Democratic	Position not yet established
47	Martin H. Kennelly (1887–1961)	April 15, 1947	April 20, 1955	8 years, 5 days	1951	Democratic	Position not yet established
48	Richard J. Daley (1902–1976)	April 20, 1955	December 20, 1976^{[†]}	21 years, 244 days	1955	Democratic	Position not yet established
48	Richard J. Daley (1902–1976)	April 20, 1955	December 20, 1976^{[†]}	21 years, 244 days	1959	Democratic	Position not yet established
48	Richard J. Daley (1902–1976)	April 20, 1955	December 20, 1976^{[†]}	21 years, 244 days	1963	Democratic	Position not yet established
48	Richard J. Daley (1902–1976)	April 20, 1955	December 20, 1976^{[†]}	21 years, 244 days	1967	Democratic	Position not yet established
48	Richard J. Daley (1902–1976)	April 20, 1955	December 20, 1976^{[†]}	21 years, 244 days	1971	Democratic	Position not yet established
48	Richard J. Daley (1902–1976)	April 20, 1955	December 20, 1976^{[†]}	21 years, 244 days	1975	Democratic	Position not yet established
49	Michael A. Bilandic (1923–2002)	December 20, 1976	April 16, 1979	2 years, 117 days	App.	Democratic	Casey Laskowski
49	Michael A. Bilandic (1923–2002)	December 20, 1976	April 16, 1979	2 years, 117 days	1977 special	Democratic	Casey Laskowski
50	Jane Byrne (1933–2014)	April 16, 1979	April 29, 1983	4 years, 13 days	1979	Democratic	Richard Mell
51	Harold Washington (1922–1987)	April 29, 1983	November 25, 1987^{[†]}	4 years, 210 days	1983	Democratic	Richard Mell
51	Harold Washington (1922–1987)	April 29, 1983	November 25, 1987^{[†]}	4 years, 210 days	1987	Democratic	David Orr
52	David Orr (born 1944); Acting	November 25, 1987	December 2, 1987	7 days	–	Democratic	Himself
53	Eugene Sawyer (1934–2008)	December 2, 1987	April 24, 1989	1 year, 143 days	App.	Democratic	David Orr
53	Eugene Sawyer (1934–2008)	December 2, 1987	April 24, 1989	1 year, 143 days	App.	Democratic	Terry Gabinski
54	Richard M. Daley (born 1942)	April 24, 1989	May 16, 2011	22 years, 22 days	1989 special	Democratic	Terry Gabinski
54	Richard M. Daley (born 1942)	April 24, 1989	May 16, 2011	22 years, 22 days	1991	Democratic	Terry Gabinski
54	Richard M. Daley (born 1942)	April 24, 1989	May 16, 2011	22 years, 22 days	1995	Democratic	Terry Gabinski
54	Richard M. Daley (born 1942)	April 24, 1989	May 16, 2011	22 years, 22 days	1999	Nonpartisan (Note: Since 1999, mayoral elections have officially been nonpartisan. A 1995 Illinois law stipulated that "candidates for mayor ... no longer would run under party labels in Chicago". However, Daley, Emanuel, Lightfoot, and Johnson are known to be Democrats.) (Democratic)	Bernard Stone
54	Richard M. Daley (born 1942)	April 24, 1989	May 16, 2011	22 years, 22 days	2003	Nonpartisan (Democratic)	Bernard Stone
54	Richard M. Daley (born 1942)	April 24, 1989	May 16, 2011	22 years, 22 days	2007	Nonpartisan (Democratic)	Bernard Stone
55	Rahm Emanuel (born 1959)	May 16, 2011	May 20, 2019	8 years, 4 days	2011	Nonpartisan (Democratic)	Ray Suarez
55	Rahm Emanuel (born 1959)	May 16, 2011	May 20, 2019	8 years, 4 days	2015	Nonpartisan (Democratic)	Brendan Reilly
56	Lori Lightfoot (born 1962)	May 20, 2019	May 15, 2023	3 years, 360 days	2019	Nonpartisan (Democratic)	Tom Tunney
57	Brandon Johnson (born 1976)	May 15, 2023	Incumbent	3 years, 161 days	2023	Nonpartisan (Democratic)	Walter Burnett Jr.

=== Notes ===
^† Died in office

== Vice mayor ==
Vice mayor of Chicago
- Incumbent; Vacant since August 7, 2025
- Inaugural holder: Casey Laskowski
- Formation: 1976
- Salary: $0

In accordance with Illinois law, the city council elects a vice mayor who serves as interim mayor in the event of a vacancy in the office of the mayor or the inability of the mayor to serve due to illness or injury, until the city council elects one of its members acting mayor or until the mayoral term expires. The vice mayoralty is currently vacant following the resignation of Walter Burnett Jr. on August 7, 2025.

The position was created by a state law that was passed in response to the power struggle that took place over succession following Richard J. Daley's death in office.

If neither the mayor nor president pro tempore can preside over a City Council meeting, then the vice mayor presides.

The position was long considered to be largely ceremonial. However, in 2023, Mayor Brandon Johnson successfully championed a resolution that gave the office a $400,000 budget. He also had his vice mayor, Burnett, act as an official community liaison for the mayoral administration.

=== List of vice mayors ===
No.	Vice Mayor	Took office	Left office	Party	Mayor(s) served under
1	Casey Laskowski (1918–2003)	1976	1979	Democratic	Michael A. Bilandic
2	Richard Mell (born 1938)	April 16, 1979	April 24, 1987	Democratic	Jane Byrne; Harold Washington
3	David Orr (born 1944)	April 1987	May 1988	Democratic	Harold Washington; Himself (acting); Eugene Sawyer
4	Terry Gabinski (born 1938)	1988	1998	Democratic	Eugene Sawyer; Richard M. Daley
5	Bernard Stone (1927–2014)	1998	2011	Democratic	Richard M. Daley
6	Ray Suarez (born 1946)	May 16, 2011	May 20, 2015	Unknown	Rahm Emanuel
7	Brendan Reilly (born 1971)	May 18, 2015	May 20, 2019	Democratic	Rahm Emanuel
8	Tom Tunney (born 1955)	May 20, 2019	May 15, 2023	Democratic	Lori Lightfoot
9	Walter Burnett Jr. (born 1963)	May 15, 2023	August 7, 2025	Democratic	Brandon Johnson

== See also ==
- Law and government of Chicago
- Timeline of Chicago history
