= 1860 Chicago mayoral election =

- March 3, 1860
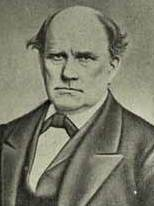

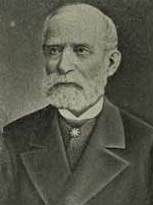
Nominee	John Wentworth	Walter S. Gurnee
Party	Democratic	Republican
Popular vote	9,998	8,739
Percentage	53.36%	46.64%
Mayor before election
John Charles Haines
Republican
Elected mayor
John Wentworth
Democratic

In the Chicago mayoral election of 1860, Democratic nominee John Wentworth defeated Republican nominee Walter S. Gurnee.

Both candidates had served as mayor before. Incidentally, each had previously been mayor under the opposite party affiliation. Gurnee had served two terms as a Democrat, having been elected in 1851 and 1852, Wentworth had previously served one term as a Republican, having been elected in 1857.

The election was held on March 3.

== Results ==
1860 Chicago mayoral election
Party	Candidate	Votes	%
Democratic	John Wentworth	9,998	53.36
Republican	Walter S. Gurnee	8,739	46.64
Turnout		18,737	
