= 1853 Chicago mayoral election =

- March 14, 1853
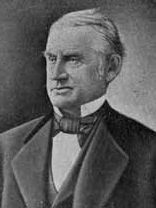

Candidate	Charles McNeill Gray	Josiah L. James
Party	Democratic
Popular vote	3,270	971
Percentage	77.10%	22.90%
Mayor before election
Walter S. Gurnee
Democratic
Elected mayor
Charles McNeill Gray
Democratic

In the 1853 Chicago mayoral election, Charles McNeill Gray defeated Josiah L. James in a landslide, winning by a 54-point margin.

Incumbent mayor Walter S. Gurnee did not run for reelection.

The election was held on March 14.

Josiah L. James was a businessman in the lumber industry.

== Results ==
Gray was elected with 77.10% of the vote, at the time the second greatest vote share a mayoral candidate had received in Chicago (behind the 80.02% that James H. Woodworth received in 1849. No subsequent mayor would be elected with a larger percent of the vote until Richard J. Daley won 77.67% of the vote in 1975.

1853 Chicago mayoral election
Party	Candidate	Votes	%
Democratic	Charles McNeill Gray	3,270	77.10
	Josiah L. James	971	22.90
Turnout		4,241	
