= 1850 Chicago mayoral election =

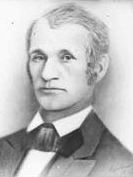

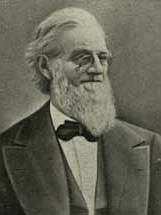

Nominee	James Curtiss	Levi Boone	Lewis C. Kerchival
Party	Democratic	Independent	Others
Popular vote	1,697	1,227	805
Percentage	45.51%	32.90%	21.59%
Mayor before election
James H. Woodworth
Independent Democrat
Elected mayor
James Curtiss
Democratic

the Chicago mayoral election of 1850, Democrat James Curtiss defeated Levi Boone and Lewis C. Kerchival by a double-digit margin.

The incumbent mayor James H. Woodworth did not run for a third term.

Curtiss had previously served one term as mayor, having previously been elected in 1847. This was Curtiss' fourth mayoral campaign, as he also ran unsuccessful campaigns in 1839 and 1848.

Kerchival had also been an unsuccessful candidate in the previous election.

== Results ==
1850 Chicago mayoral election
Party	Candidate	Votes	%
Democratic	James Curtiss	1,697	45.51
Independent	Levi Boone	1,227	32.90
Other	Lewis C. Kerchival	805	21.59
Turnout		3,729	
