= Chicago Fire Department =

Fire department of the city of Chicago

City of Chicago Fire Department

Operational area
- Country: United States
- State: Illinois
- City: Chicago
- Coordinates: 41°49′50″N 87°37′26″W

Agency overview
- Established: August 2, 1858; 168 years ago
- Annual calls: 888,110 (2018)
- Employees: 5,173 (2017)
- Commissioner: Annette Nance Holt
- EMS level: Advanced Life Support (ALS) & Basic Life Support (BLS)
- IAFF: Local 2
- Motto: "We're There When You Need Us"

Facilities and equipment
- Divisions: 5
- Battalions: 25
- Stations: 96
- Engines: 96
- Trucks: 61
- Squads: 4
- Ambulances: 80
- HAZMAT: 2
- USAR: 2
- Airport crash: 10
- Helicopters: 2
- Fireboats: 2

Website
- www.chicago.gov/fire
- www.iaff-local2.org

The City of Chicago Fire Department, commonly known as the Chicago Fire Department (CFD), is the municipal full-service fire department of the city of Chicago.

It is the second-largest municipal fire department in the United States, after the New York City Fire Department (FDNY). It is also one of the oldest major organized fire departments in the nation. It is under the jurisdiction of the mayor of Chicago.

The department is led by the fire commissioner, currently Annette Nance-Holt. The Fire Commissioner is appointed by the mayor of Chicago, is confirmed by the Chicago City Council, and is assisted by the First Deputy Commissioner, who oversees the department's bureaus. There are four bureaus under the command of the First Deputy Commissioner: Operations, Fire Prevention, Administrative Services, and Logistics.

The Chicago Fire Department receives over 800,000 emergency calls annually.

== History ==
The "Washington Volunteers," the first fire company, was established in 1832.

The first Chicago regulation, which forbade "the passing of any stove pipe through the roof, partition, or siding of any building, unless guarded by tin or iron six inches from the wood," was passed in November 1833. For this infraction, there was a $5.00 fine.

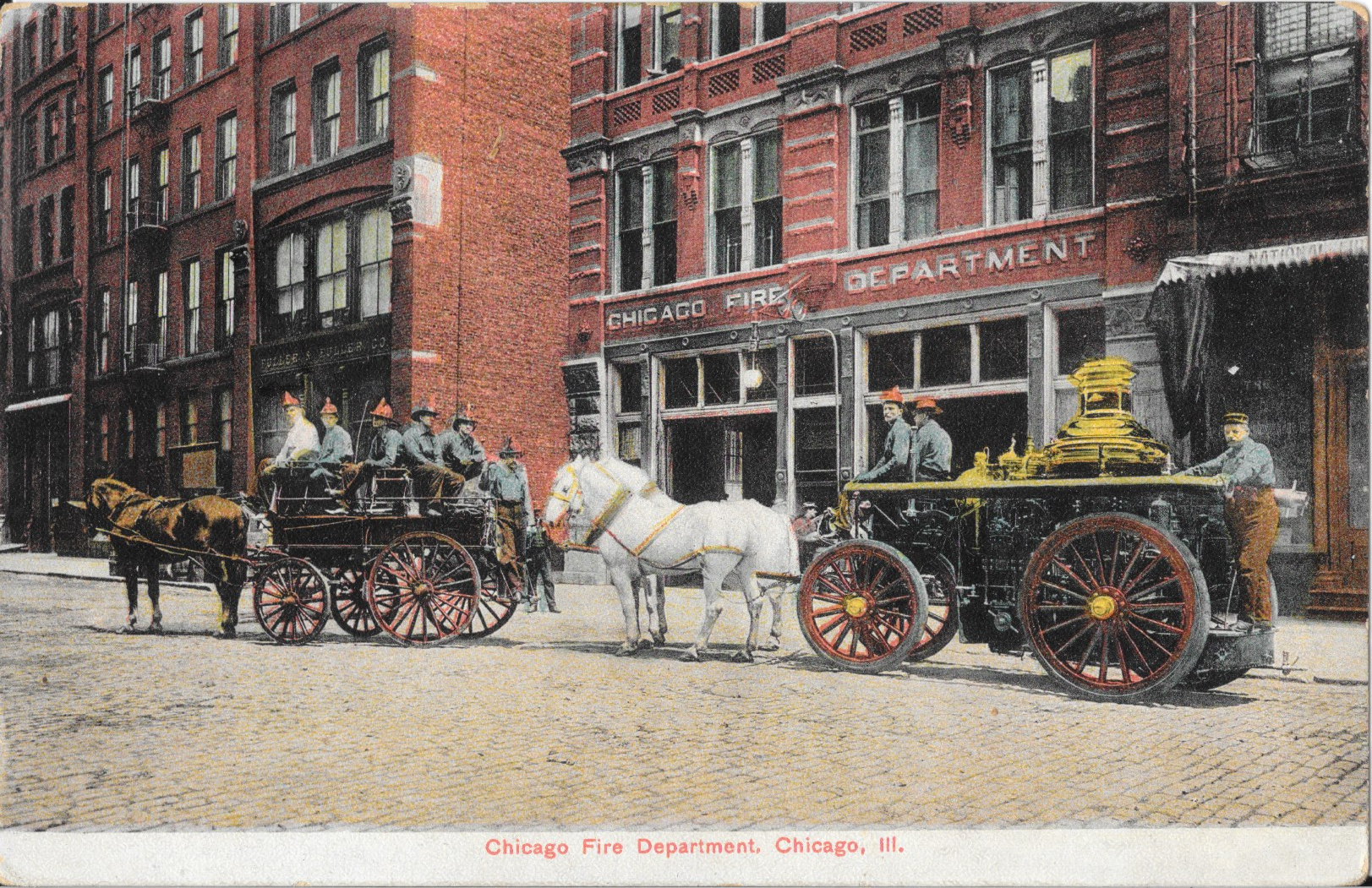
Chicago Fire Department truck, circa 1909

The volunteer fire department was disestablished on August 2, 1858, when the city council passed an ordinance creating the City of Chicago Fire Department as a professional force with salaried firefighters.

== Organization ==
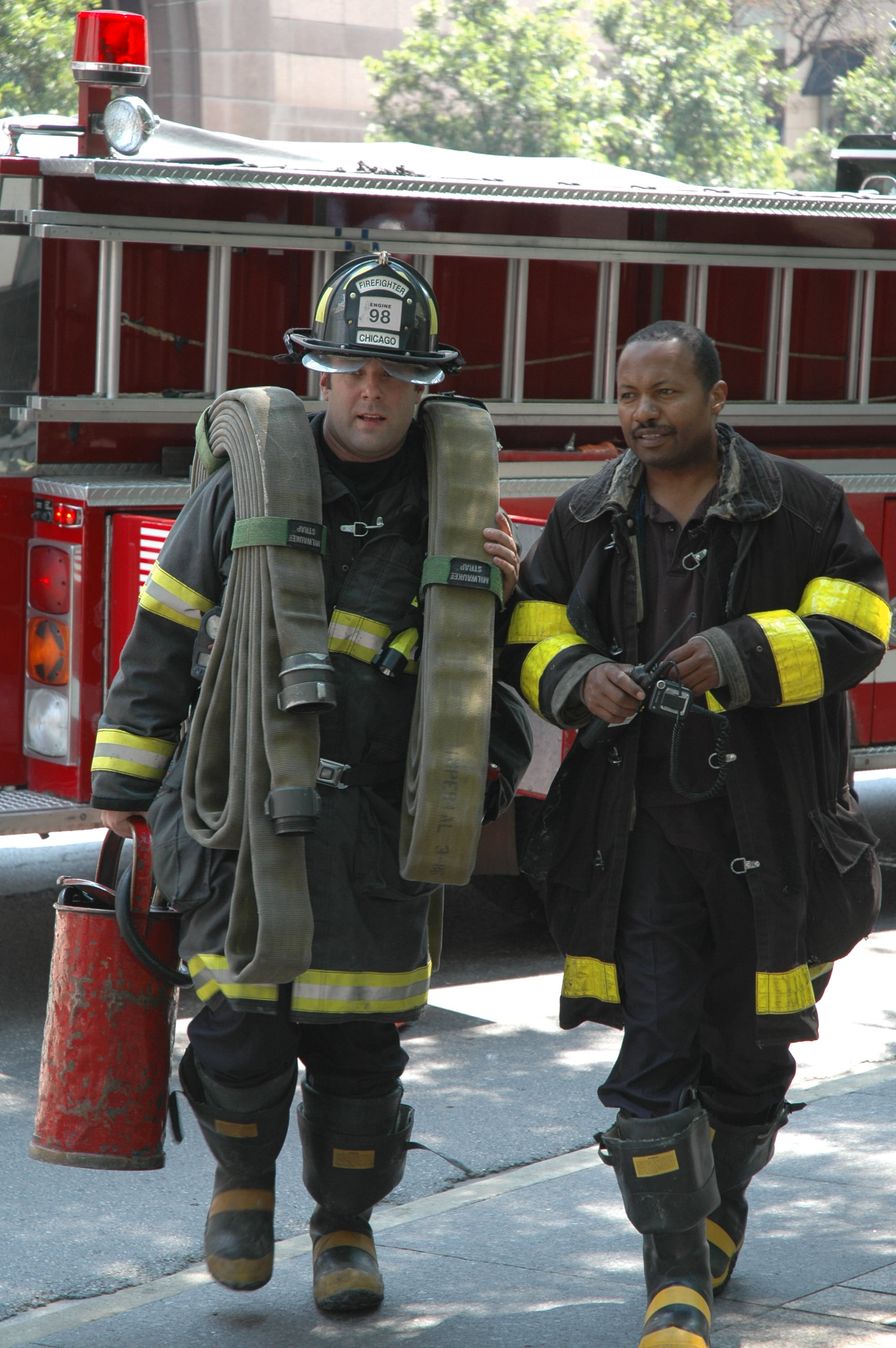
Chicago firefighters responding to a call on Michigan Ave. wearing pre-2006 turnout gear.

=== Bureaus ===
There are four Bureaus within the Chicago Fire Department: Bureau of Operations, Bureau of Administrative Services, Bureau of Logistics and Bureau of Fire Prevention. Each of the four Bureaus are commanded by a Deputy Fire Commissioner, who then reports to the 1st Deputy Fire Commissioner, who in turn reports to the Fire Commissioner.

==== Bureau of Operations ====
The Bureau of Operations is the largest Bureau within the Chicago Fire Department.The Bureau of Operations commands the following Divisions:Fire Suppression & Rescue,Emergency Medical Services (EMS),Special Operations,and the Office of Fire Investigation (OFI).The Bureau of Operations is composed of over 4,500 Uniformed Fire and EMS personnel.It is commanded by a Deputy Fire Commissioner

The Fire Suppression and Rescue Division is organized into 5 Districts which command a total of 24 Battalions and 1 Special Operations Battalion.

==== Bureau Of Administrative Services ====
The Bureau of Administrative Services commands the following Divisions: Personnel, Training, the Photo Unit, and the Employee Assistance Program. The Bureau Of Administrative Services is commanded by a Deputy Fire Commissioner.

==== Bureau of Logistics ====
The Bureau of Logistics commands the following Divisions: Support Services, Support & Logistics (EMS), Equipment & Supply, Building & Property Management, Record, Employee Relations, Labor Relations, Staff/Human Relations, the Pension Board, the Regulatory Compliance, and Management Information Systems/Technology. The Bureau of Logistics is commanded by a Deputy Fire Commissioner.

==== Bureau of Fire Prevention ====
The Bureau of Fire Prevention commands the following Divisions: Code Compliance and Inspections. The Bureau of Fire Prevention is commanded by a Deputy Fire Commissioner.

== Operations ==
The Bureau of Operations is one of four Bureaus within the organization of the Chicago Fire Department. Like the other Bureaus, the Bureau of Operations is commanded by a Deputy Fire Commissioner, who reports to the 1st Deputy Commissioner, who in-turn reports to the Fire Commissioner. The Bureau of Operations is currently the largest Bureau within the Chicago Fire Department and is organized into four Divisions: Fire Suppression and Rescue, Emergency Medical Services (EMS), Special Operations (including the Technical Rescue Unit, the Hazardous Materials Unit, and the Air-Sea Rescue Unit), and the Office of Fire Investigation (OFI). The Fire Suppression and Rescue Division is commanded by an Assistant Deputy Fire Commissioner. The Special Operations Division and the EMS Division are also commanded by an Assistant Deputy Commissioner. The Office of Fire Investigation (OFI) is under the command of the Commanding Fire Marshal, equivalent to the rank of Deputy District Chief.

== Fire station locations and apparatus ==
The Chicago Fire Department is organized into 5 Districts, which command a total of 24 Battalions and a Special Operations Battalion.

== Major incidents and accidents ==
- On October 8th ,1871 the Great Chicago Fire started at a barn on 137 DeKoven st. The fire was caused by hot conditions and a drought .The Chicago Fire department put out the fire on October 10th 1871 with the help of some rain.
- On December 1st, 1958, Our Lady Of The Angels Catholic school caught fire after a garbage can caught fire.The disaster caused fire safety codes to change and made schools much safer.

== In popular culture ==
The Chicago Fire Department cooperated with film director Ron Howard on making the 1991 film Backdraft, starring Kurt Russell, William Baldwin, and Robert De Niro.

The NBC television show Chicago Fire, centers on a group of fictional firefighters and paramedics at a firehouse that is the headquarters of the fictitious Engine Company 51,Truck Company 81,Rescue Squad Company 3,Battalion Chief Unit 25 (previously reassigned to another firehouse,now returned to Firehouse 51),Deputy District Chief Unit 2-2-6 (reassigned to another Firehouse), and Ambulance Unit 61 (represented by the headquarters for real Engine Company 18).

The arcade game Emergency Call Ambulance takes place in Chicago. Players would take the role of an unnamed Chicago Fire Department Paramedic and ambulance driver, as they race through Chicago streets to save lives in 4 different cases.

== Ranks ==
| Title | Duties | Insignia | Promotion criteria |
|---|---|---|---|
| Fire Commissioner | The Fire Commissioner is responsible for Commanding the entire Chicago Fire Department | | Appointed by the Mayor of Chicago and confirmed by the Chicago City Council |
| First Deputy Fire Commissioner | The First Deputy Fire Commissioner is Second in Command of the Chicago Fire Department | | Appointed by the Fire Commissioner |
| Deputy Fire Commissioner | Deputy Fire Commissioners are Commanders of a Bureau in the Chicago Fire Department | | Appointed by the Fire Commissioner |
| Assistant Deputy Fire Commissioner | Assistant Deputy Fire Commissioners are Commanders of a Division in the Chicago Fire Department | | Appointed by the Fire Commissioner |
| District Chief | District Chiefs are responsible for Commanding a Fire District in the Chicago Fire Department | | Appointed by the Fire Commissioner |
| Deputy District Chief | Deputy District Chiefs are Second in Command of a Fire District in the Chicago Fire Department | | Appointed by the Fire Commissioner |
| Assistant Deputy Chief Paramedic | Assistant Deputy Chief Paramedics Command an EMS Field Division in the Chicago Fire Department | | Appointed by the Fire Commissioner |
| Battalion Chief | Battalion Chiefs are in charge of Multiple Fire Companies/Units and Firehouses in the Chicago Fire Department | | By examination |
| Paramedic Field Chief | Paramedic Field Chiefs Command an EMS District in the Chicago Fire Department | | By examination |
| Captain | Captains are in charge of the company they are assigned to. Engine Captains are also in charge of the firehouse that they are assigned to | | By examination |
| Ambulance Commander | Ambulance Commanders are in charge of the ambulance company they are assigned to. | | By examination |
| Lieutenant | Lieutenants are in charge of Commanding the company/unit they are assigned to on their shift. | | By examination |
| Paramedic In Charge | Paramedics in charge Command an Ambulance Crew | | Seniority |
| Engineer | Engineers are responsible for Driving/Operating a fire engine(pumper). | ENGR | Seniority |
| Paramedic | Paramedics Provide medical aid to patients | NONE | Must pass a 1 year probationary period from Candidate paramedic |
| Firefighter/ Firefighter EMT/ Firefighter Paramedic | Firefighters Provide Fire Suppression and Rescue services. Firefighters may also be required to cross trained as either an EMT and may also be a Paramedic | NONE | Must pass a 1 year probationary period from Candidate Firefighter/ Candidate Firefighter EMT/ Candidate Firefighter Paramedic |
| Candidate Firefighter/ Candidate Firefighter EMT/ Candidate Firefighter Paramedic | Firefighters are considered candidates from the day they enter the academy. After graduating the academy, they then complete one year on a fire company. After that year they are granted the rank of firefighter. | NONE | Must graduate from the Fire Academy |
| Candidate Paramedic | Firefighters are considered candidates from the day they enter the academy. After graduating the academy, they then complete one year on a fire company. After that year they are granted the rank of firefighter. | NONE | Must graduate from the Fire Academy |

== Gallery ==
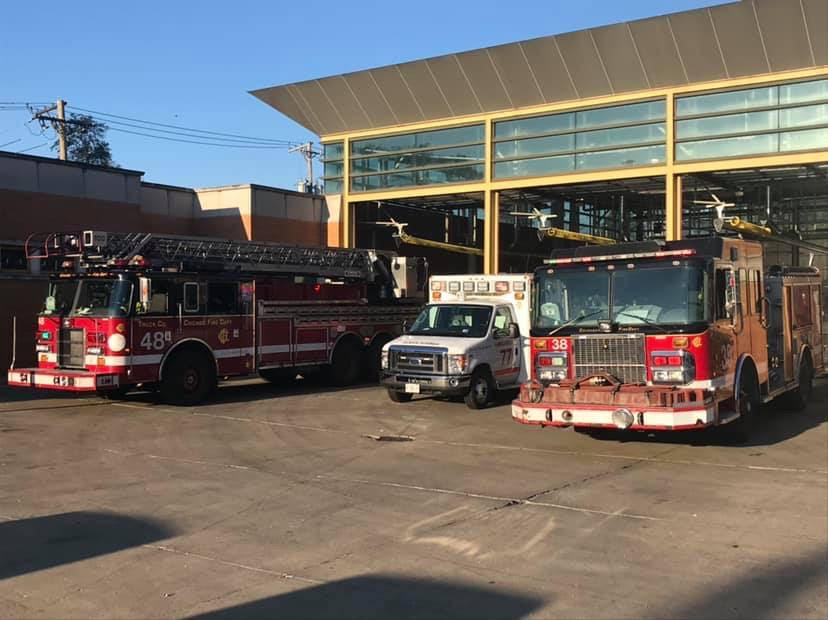
Quarters of Engine 38, Truck 48, and Ambulance 77 in the North Lawndale area

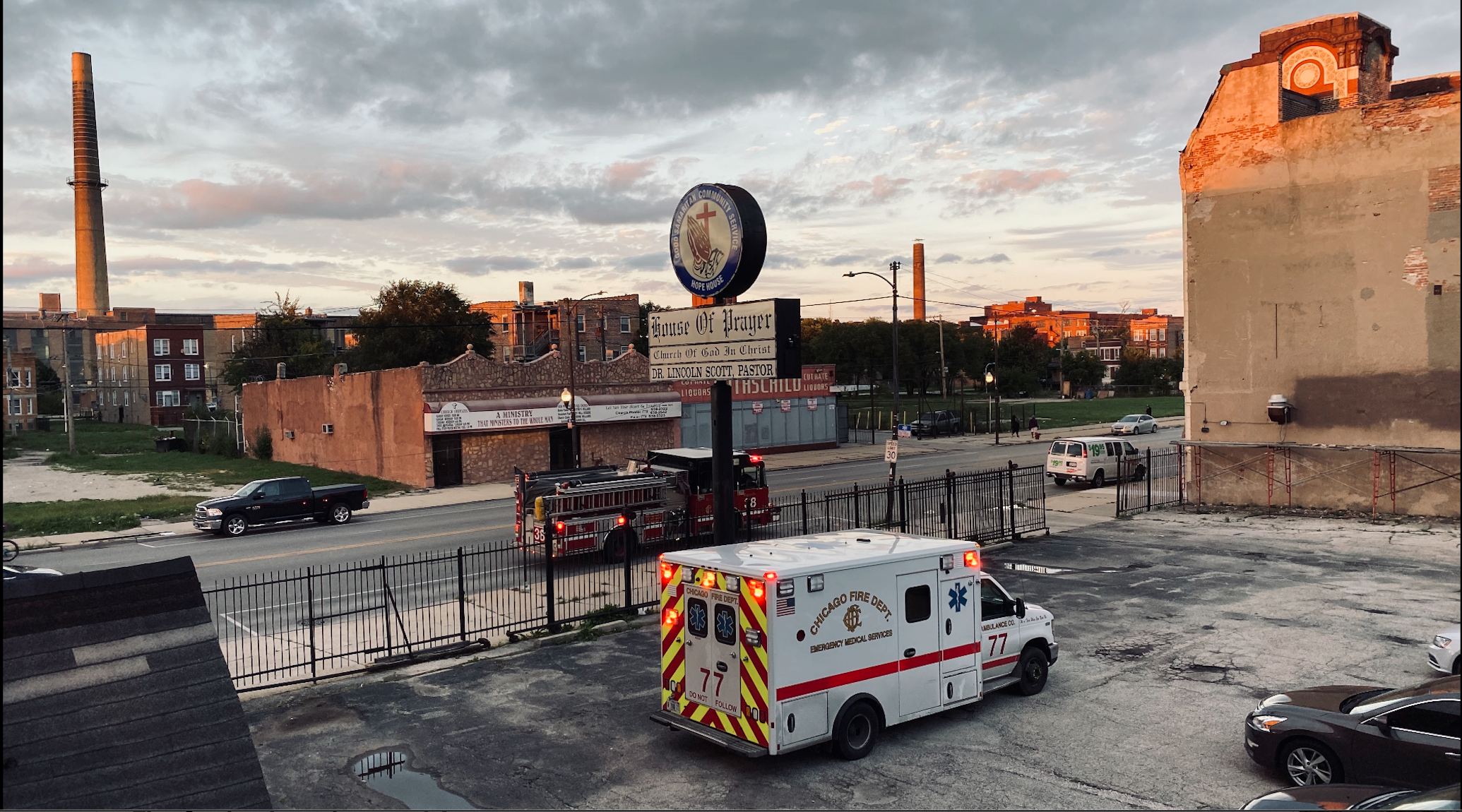
Ambulance 77 & Engine 38 responding to a medical emergency on Roosevelt Ave.

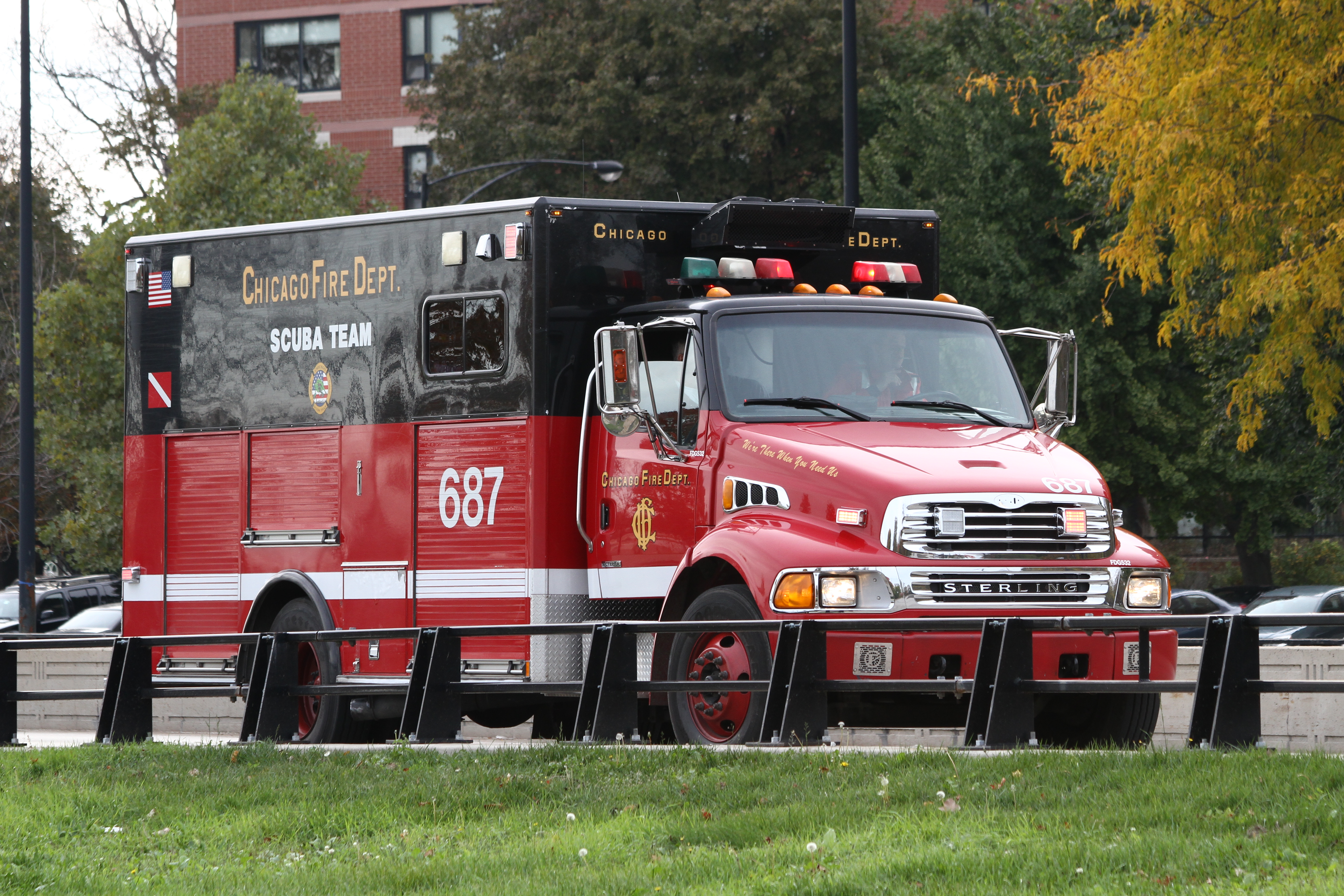
Scuba Team vehicle on Lake Shore Drive in Hyde Park

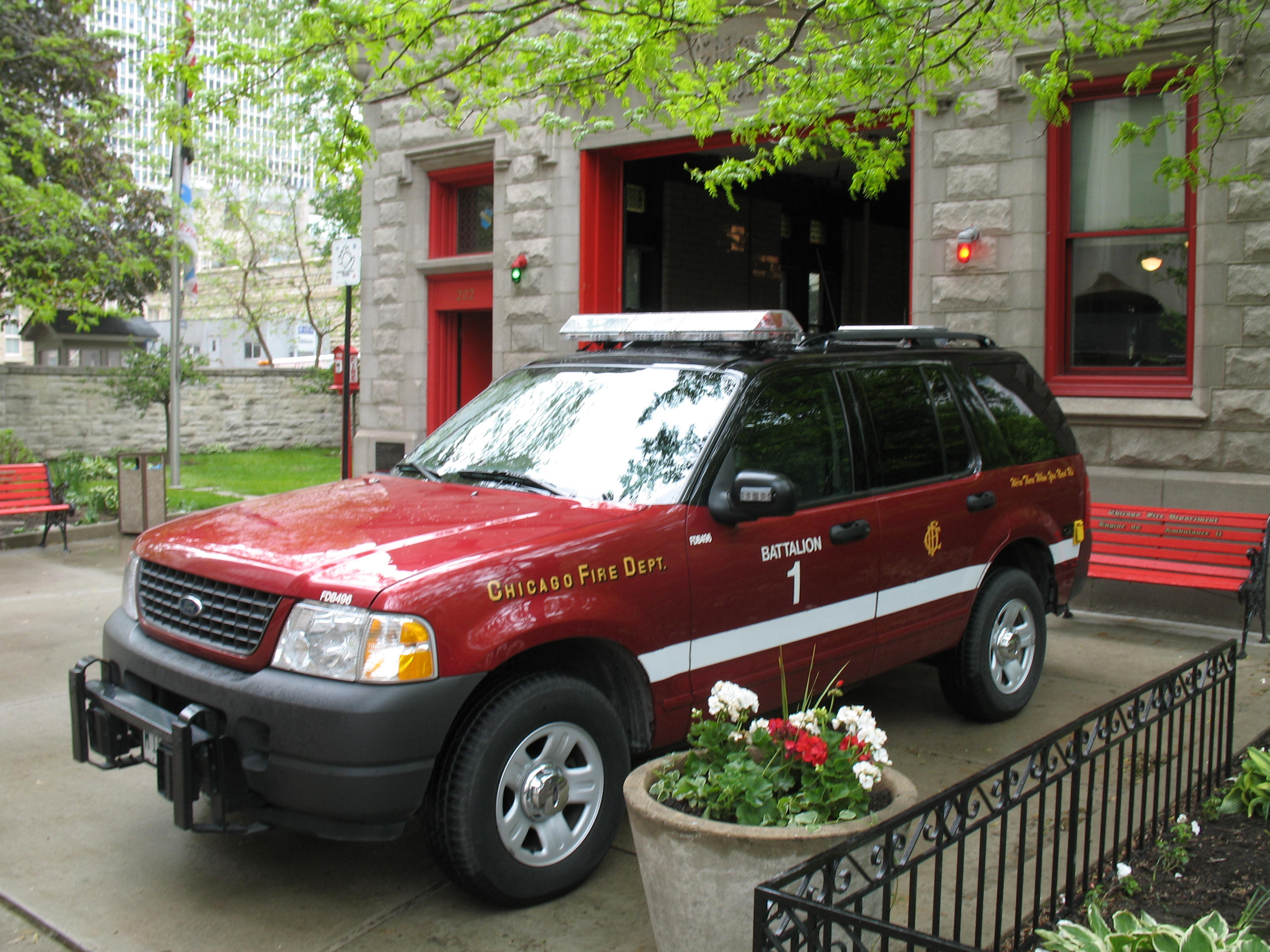
CFD 1st Battalion Chief's Ford Explorer SUV

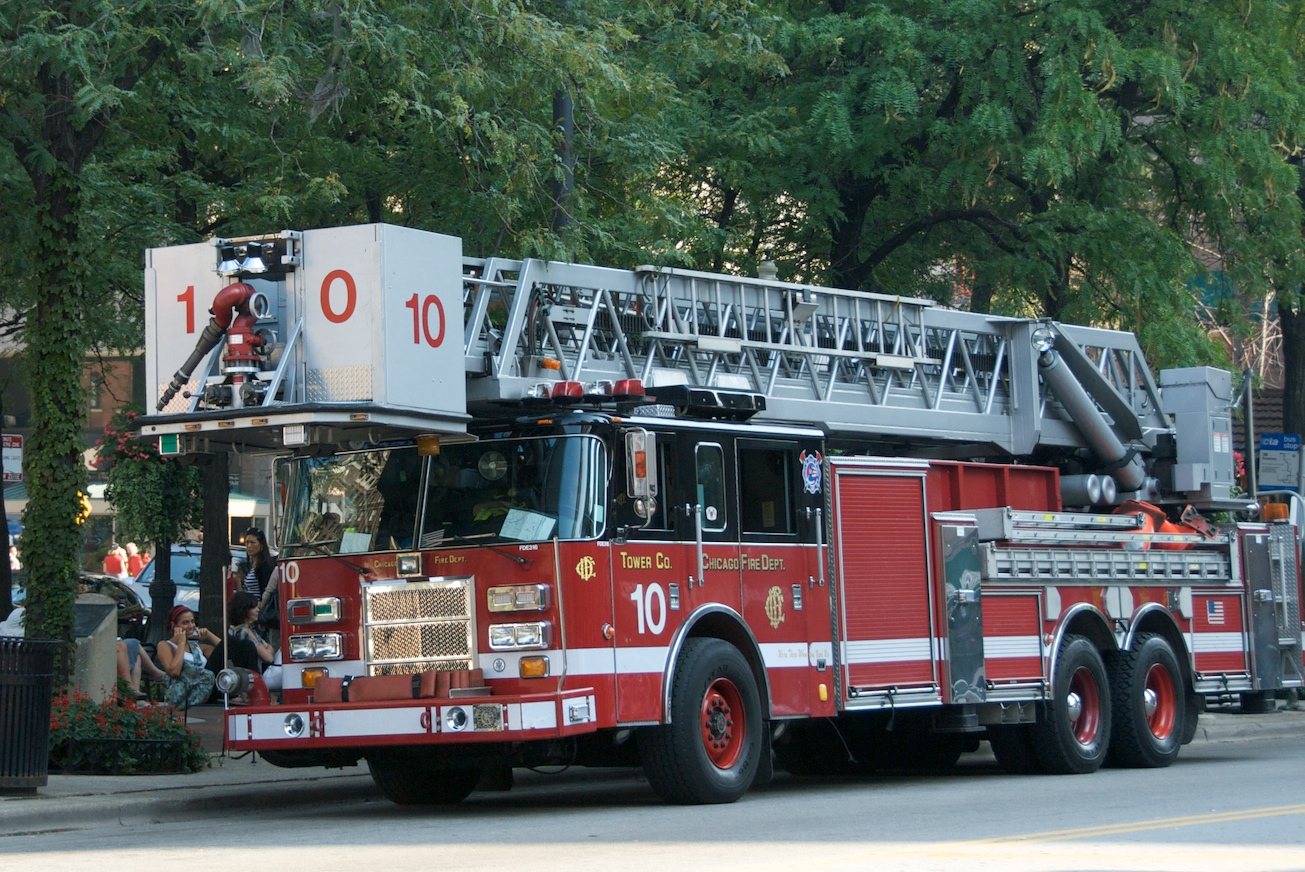
CFD Tower Ladder Company 10

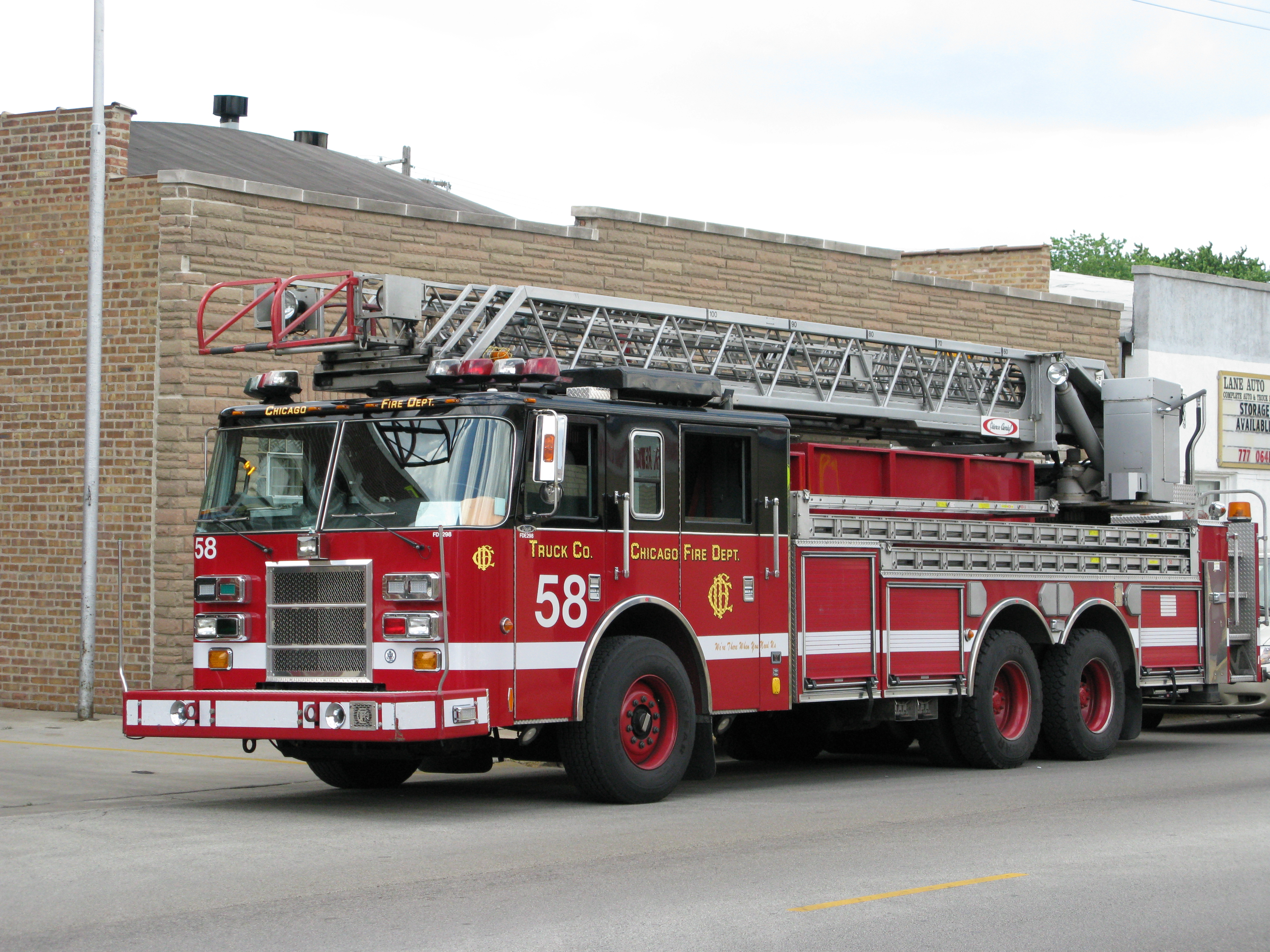
CFD Truck Company 58

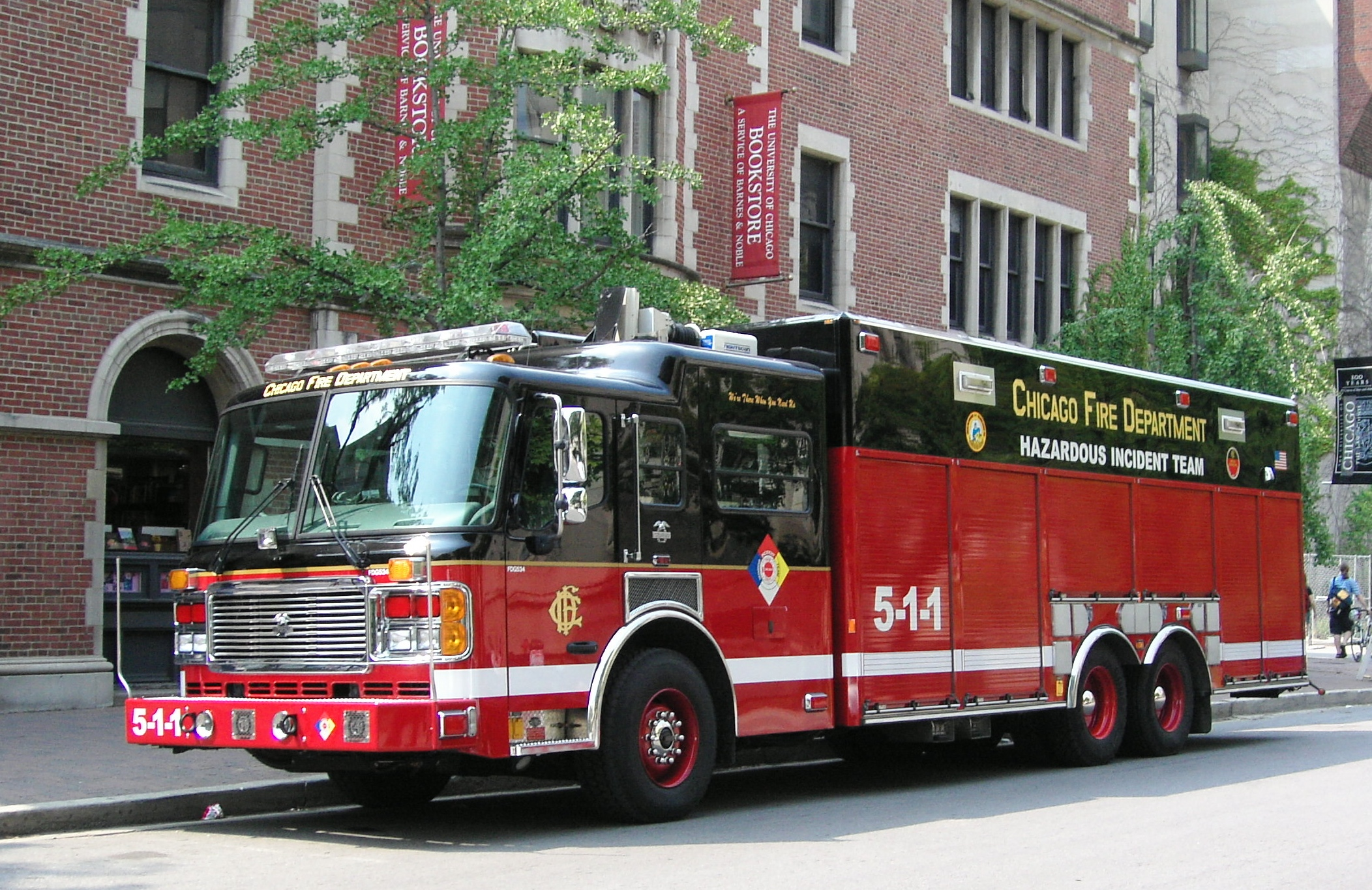
CFD Haz-Mat. Incident Team (H.I.T.) Unit 5-1-1

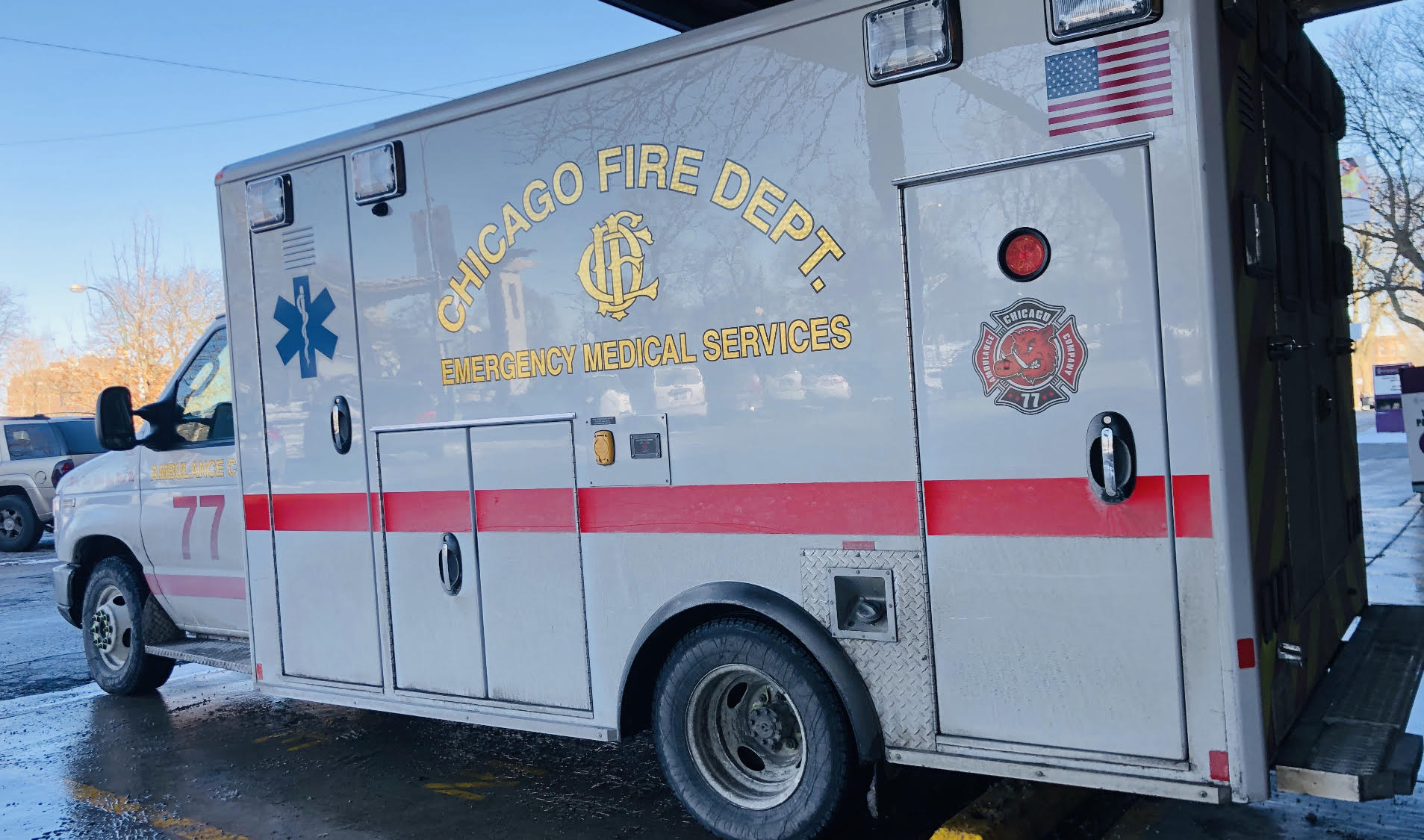
Ambulance 77 at St. Anthony's Hospital

== See also ==
- Great Chicago Fire
