= Casey Laskowski =

American politician (1918–2003)

1st Vice Mayor of Chicago
- In office 1976–1979
- Mayor: Michael Bilandic
- Preceded by: Office established
- Succeeded by: Richard Mell

Member of the Chicago City Council from the 35th ward
- In office April 20, 1955 – April 16, 1979
- Preceded by: Frank Peska
- Succeeded by: John Marcin

Personal details
- Born: November 23, 1918
- Died: August 15, 2003 (aged 84)
- Party: Democratic
- Education: DePaul University
- Occupation: Mortician and politician

Casimir "Casey" Laskowski (November 23, 1918 – August 15, 2003) was an American politician and mortician who served on the Chicago City Council for 24 years.

== Early life and education ==
Laskowski was born to immigrants from Białystok, Poland. Laskowski attended DePaul University. He received his mortician's license. Known for his musical skills, he also studied at the American Conservatory of Music.

During World War II, he served as a lieutenant colonel in the United States Air Force.

== City Council career ==
Laskowski was elected to the Chicago City Council in 1955. In his first campaign, he tied himself to Ben Adamowski. Adamowski ran an outsider campaign for the Democratic nomination in the 1955 Chicago mayoral election, ultimately losing to Richard J. Daley. His decision to side with Adamowski over Daley, the establishment candidate, earned Laskowski the nickname "The Rebel".

After winning election to the City Council, Laskowski made an unsuccessful attempt to take control of Democratic Party power in the 35th ward from City Clerk John Marcin. After this, however, Laskowski became largely aligned with the city's Democratic machine.

Laskowski's ward was located in a heavily Polish neighborhood on Chicago's Northwest Side. He belonged to the City Council's "Polish bloc". In 1976, this bloc voted together in the deciding votes which established a vice mayor position to resolve uncertainties about mayoral succession in the city. Laskowski was made the inaugural vice mayor of the city. The position, largely honorary, meant that he would have served as acting mayor if the mayoralty had become vacant.

For years, Laskowski chaired the City Council Aviation Committee. He was an early and strong proponent of building a south suburban airport.

In 1979, Ward party boss John Marcin, who had not been slated by the Democratic Party for reelection as clerk, challenged Laskowski for his City Council seat and defeated him. Laskowski and Marcin had previously, for a long time, been political allies. Laskowski was blindsided by Marcin's move to run against him. He attempted to hurt Marcin's candidacy by disclosing that Marcin's functional primary residence was not his humble apartment in the ward, but rather, was a mansion in the Lake County suburb of Antioch, Illinois.

== Personal life and other activities ==
Laskowski was a licensed mortician. He founded and owned Casey Laskowski and Sons Funeral Home in the Kelvyn Park neighborhood. He and his family lived above the funeral home. He and his wife, Virginia, had three children.

He served as the president of the Polish American Businessmen's Club. He also served on the John Barry School Board. He was also a member of the American Legion, AMVETS, Knights of Columbus, LaFourths Association, Lafayette Council #361, Funeral Directors Service Association, I.F.D.A., N.F.D.A., Chicago Society P.N.A., and P.L.A.V.

Laskowski died of complications from a heart surgery on August 15, 2003, at the age of 84.
