= 1848 Chicago mayoral election =

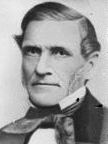

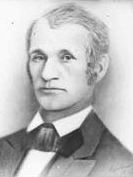
Nominee	James H. Woodworth	James Curtiss
Party	Independent Democrat	Democratic
Popular vote	1,971	1,361
Percentage	59.15%	40.85%
Mayor before election
James Curtiss
Democratic
Elected mayor
James H. Woodworth
Independent Democrat

The 1848 Chicago mayoral election , independent Democratic candidate James H. Woodworth defeated incumbent Democrat James Curtiss.

The election took place during a time of instability within the two major national political parties (the Democrats and the Whigs). Woodworth's victory dealt a significant blow to Chicago's Democratic organization.

== General election ==
1848 Chicago mayoral election
Party	Candidate	Votes	%
Independent Democrat	James H. Woodworth	1,971	59.15
Democratic	James Curtiss (incumbent)	1,361	40.85
Turnout		3,334	
