= Walter S. Gurnee =

American politician (1813–1903)

Walter Smith Gurnee
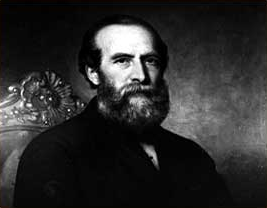

14th Mayor of Chicago
- In office March 11, 1851 – March 7, 1853
- Preceded by: James Curtiss
- Succeeded by: Charles McNeill Gray

City Treasurer of Chicago
- In office 1843–1845
- Preceded by: Francis Cornwall Sherman
- Succeeded by: William L. Church
- In office 1840–1840
- Preceded by: N.H. Bolles
- Succeeded by: N.H. Bolles

Personal details
- Born: March 9, 1813 Haverstraw, New York, U.S.
- Died: April 17, 1903 (aged 90) New York City, New York, U.S.
- Resting place: Sleepy Hollow, New York, U.S.
- Party: Democratic
- Spouse: Mary Matilda Coe
- Children: Delia Gurnee (1840-1915); Evelyn Gurnee Scott (1843-1881); Frances Medora Gurnee Watson (1844-1880); Walter Smith Gurnee, Jr. (1846-1918); Grace Gurnee (1850-1870); Augustus Coe Gurnee (1855-1926)
- Relatives: Descendants of Robert Coe

Walter Smith Gurnee (March 9, 1813 – April 17, 1903) served as Mayor of Chicago (1851–53) for the Democratic Party. The Village of Gurnee, Illinois is named for him.

== Biography ==
Gurnee was born in Haverstraw, New York and arrived in Chicago in 1836 after spending time in Michigan. Once in Chicago, he established a tannery, which, by 1844, employed between thirty and fifty men. He was a founding member of the Chicago Board of Trade. Prior to becoming the mayor of Chicago, Gurnee was the primary partner of Gurnee & Matteson, a saddlery and leather firm. Gurnee did well enough in this business, and in his tannery, that he amassed a large fortune before moving to New York City.

Gurnee campaigned for the mayoralty on the issue of public ownership of the city's water supply. Once in office, he fought against the merger of the Illinois Central and Michigan Central railroads, originally planned to meet up south of the city. He was elected to two terms, winning the mayoralty in 1851 and being reelected in 1852.

Gurnee unsuccessfully attempted to stage a return to the mayor's office in the 1860 mayoral election. He lost to "Long John" Wentworth, who had previously served a term as mayor as a Democrat, but had switched to the Republican Party.

The village of Gurnee, Illinois was named for him.

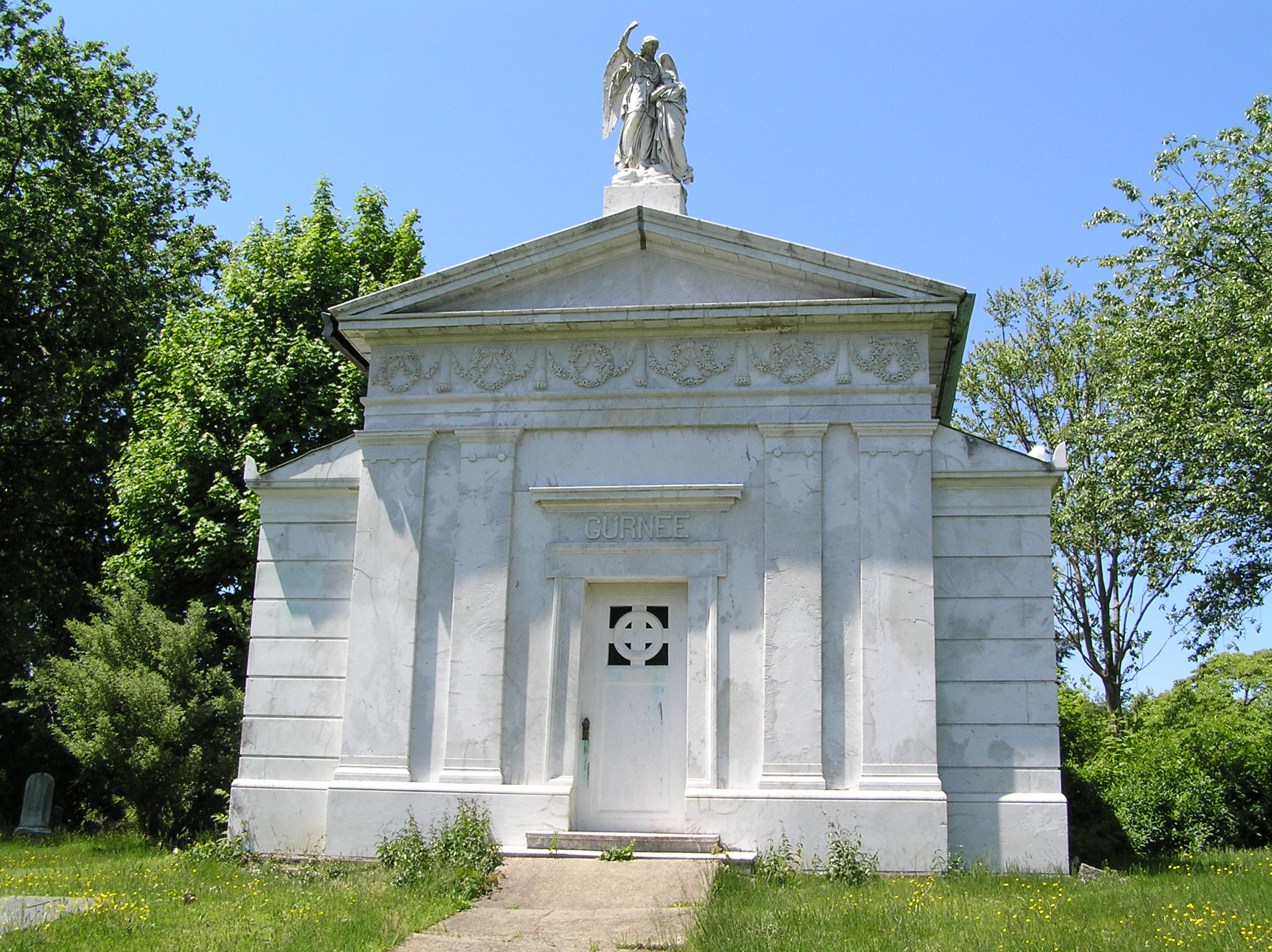
The mausoleum of Walter Gurnee

Party political offices
Preceded by James Curtiss	Democratic nominee for Mayor of Chicago; 1851, (Note: one of two Democratic nominees in 1851, along with James Curtiss)1852	Succeeded by Charles McNeill Gray
Preceded by John Charles Haines	Republican nominee for Mayor of Chicago; 1861	Succeeded by Julian Sidney Rumsey
