= James Curtiss =

American politician (1806–1859)

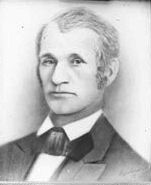

11th & 13th

Mayor of Chicago
- In office March 12, 1850 – March 11, 1851
- Preceded by: James H. Woodworth
- Succeeded by: Walter S. Gurnee
- In office March 9, 1847 – March 14, 1848
- Preceded by: John P. Chapin
- Succeeded by: James H. Woodworth

City Clerk of Chicago
- In office 1842–1843
- Preceded by: Thomas Hoyne
- Succeeded by: James M. Lowe

Chicago Alderman
- In office 1846–1847 Serving with John S.C. Hogan
- Preceded by: Fancis Edwards/ Francis H. Taylor
- Succeeded by: J. Brinkerhoff/ Benjamin W. Raymond
- Constituency: 3rd ward
- In office 1838–1839 Serving with John S.C. Hogan
- Preceded by: Peter Bolles/ Francis C. Sherman
- Succeeded by: Eli S. Prescott/ Clement C. Stose
- Constituency: 2nd ward

Clerk of the Court of Cook County
- In office 1845
- Preceded by: inaugural officeholder

State's Attorney
- In office 1835

Town Clerk of Chicago
- In office 1836–1837
- Preceded by: Ebenezer Peck
- Succeeded by: Isaac N. Arnold (city clerk)

Personal details
- Born: March 29, 1806 Wethersfield, Connecticut, U.S.
- Died: November 2, 1859 (aged 53) Joliet, Illinois, U.S.
- Party: Democratic Party
- Spouse: Mary Kimball
- Children: James, Mary Kimball, Sarah, Lucy Maria, Elizabeth, Laura, Charles Chauncy, Laura Minnie, George Warren

James Curtiss (also Curtis; March 29, 1806 – November 2, 1859) was an American politician who twice served as Mayor of Chicago, Illinois (1847–1848 and 1850–1851) for the Democratic Party.

== Early life ==
Born on March 29, 1806, in Wethersfield, Connecticut, Curtiss became a printer's apprentice at an early age in Philadelphia. He worked for a time at the Portland Argus, then was printer, and eventually editor and publisher of the Eastport Northern Light, a Jackson Democrat newspaper. He married Mary Kimball on May 18, 1830. From 1830 through 1835, he served as a postmaster in Eastport. In 1834, Curtiss was under investigation by the Postmaster General for his management of the office.

== Political career in Chicago ==
Curtiss arrived in Chicago from Eastport, Maine, in 1835 and became editor of the Chicago Democrat. Almost immediately after his arrival in Chicago Curtiss began a career of public service.

Shortly after his arrival in Chicago, he was appointed States Attorney for the district north of the Kankakee River. He was appointed to Chicago's first Board of Health. He succeeded Ebenezer Peck as Town Clerk in September 1836. He also opened a short-lived law practice with William Stuart in 1836 named Stuart and Curtiss, which was dissolved the following year.

The Panic of 1837 left a large number of land investors unable to meet their obligations. In hopes of delaying the resulting foreclosures Curtiss and others had unsuccessfully attempted to delay the opening of the Municipal Court that winter.

Curtiss was elected alderman for the 2nd ward in 1838. In 1839, he ran in Chicago's third mayoral election, losing to Benjamin Wright Raymond. In 1842, he was elected City Clerk. In 1843, he was made Corresponding Secretary of the Chicago chapter of the Washington Temperance Society. In 1845, the Illinois Legislature created the Court of Cook County and appointed Curtiss as its first clerk. In 1846, he was elected as alderman again, this time for the 3rd ward.

=== First mayoral term ===
Curtiss became mayor after winning the 1847 election, running a successful campaign against Philo Carpenter (Liberty Party) and John H. Kinzie (Whig). He was sworn in on March 9, 1847.

He lost his bid for reelection in 1848, being defeated by James Hutchinson Woodworth (an independent Democrat who ran on a fusion ticket supported by Whigs and Democrats). His tenure ended on March 14, 1848, when Woodworth succeeded him in office.

During Curtiss' tenure Chicago's first telegraph line opened on January 11, 1848, and the Chicago Board of Trade was established.

=== Second mayoral term ===
Curtiss returned to the mayor's office after winning the 1850 Chicago mayoral election, defeating Levi Day Boone and Lewis C. Kerchival (both of these challengers being Democrats without formal party nomination). He was sworn in on March 12, 1850.

Curtiss was again defeated in his bid for reelection, losing the 1851 election to Walter S. Gurnee. His tenure ended on March 11, 1851, when he was succeeded in office by Gurnee.

In 1852, he sought to unseat Gurnee, but again lost.

== Retirement from politics ==
Retiring from politics, Curtiss moved to West Urbana (now Champaign) Illinois in 1855, and took up farming.

== Death ==
Curtiss died on November 2, 1859, in Joliet, Illinois, after a long illness. His funeral was held at the Second Presbyterian Church on Wabash Avenue following the Odd Fellows rites. Originally buried in City Cemetery, when the Cemetery was moved to make way for Lincoln Park, his remains were lost.

== Works cited ==
- Merriner, James (2004). Grafters and Goo Goos: Corruption and Reform in Chicago, 1833-2003. Southern Illinois University Press. ISBN 0809325713.
