= Charles McNeill Gray =

American politician

Charles Gray
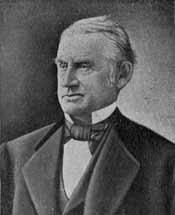

15th Mayor of Chicago
- In office March 7, 1853 – March 15, 1854
- Preceded by: Walter S. Gurnee
- Succeeded by: Isaac Milliken

Personal details
- Born: June 13, 1807 Sherburne, New York
- Died: October 17, 1885 (aged 78) Chicago, Illinois
- Resting place: Graceland Cemetery
- Party: Democratic

Charles McNeill Gray (June 13, 1807 – October 17, 1885) served as Mayor of Chicago, Illinois (1853–1854). He was a member of the Democratic Party.

== Biography ==
Charles McNeill Gray was born in Sherburne, New York on June 13, 1807. He arrived in Chicago on July 17, 1834, and took a job as a clerk for Gurdon Saltonstall Hubbard, later working for Peter Cohen, a retail merchant. By 1844 he was a candle maker with his own shop. He subsequently worked as a manufacturer, contractor and railroad man. He was elected mayor in 1853.

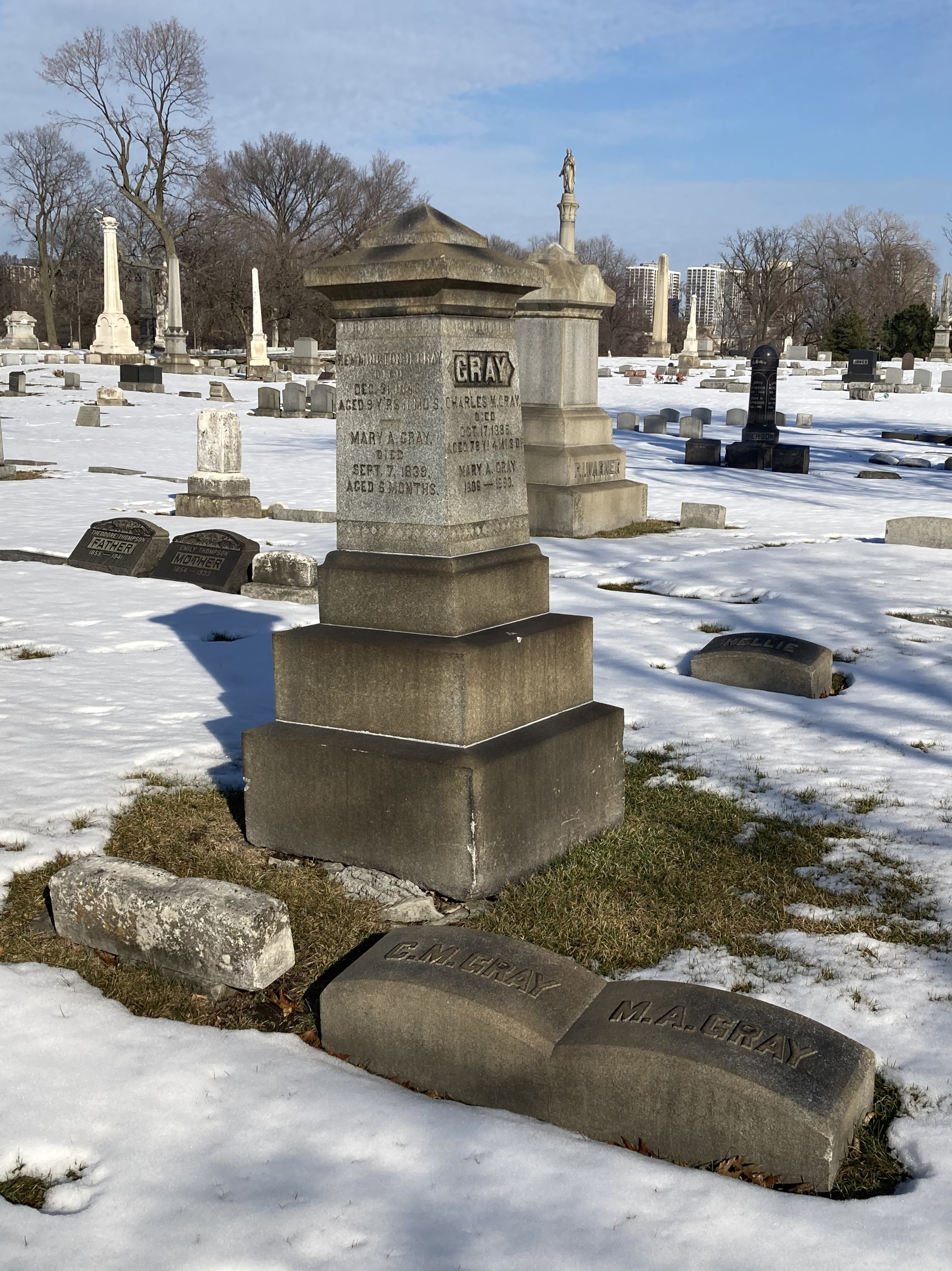
Gray's grave at Graceland Cemetery

He died at his home in Chicago on October 17, 1885, and was buried at Graceland Cemetery.
