= Alson Sherman =

American politician (1811–1903)

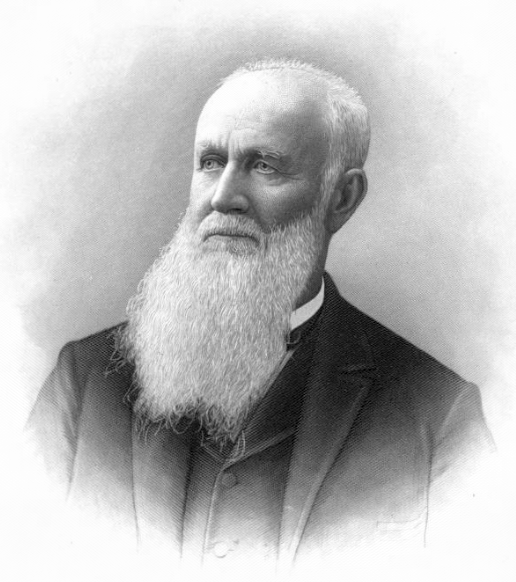

8th Mayor of Chicago
- In office April 2, 1844 – March 10, 1845
- Preceded by: Augustus Garrett
- Succeeded by: Augustus Garrett

Chicago Alderman
- In office 1849–1851 Serving with John C. Haines
- Preceded by: E.H. Chapin
- Succeeded by: J.L. James
- Constituency: 5th ward
- In office 1842–1843 Serving with Hamilton Barnes
- Preceded by: Ira Miltimore/ William S. Stow
- Succeeded by: Azel Peck/ Charles Taylor
- Constituency: 3rd ward

Personal details
- Born: April 21, 1811 Barre, Vermont
- Died: September 22, 1903 (aged 92) Waukegan, Illinois
- Party: Independent Democrat
- Spouse: Aurora Abbott
- Children: Alla, Fannie, Kate, Frank, Flora, Walter, Helen, Mary, Nancy, Abijah, Adeline, Marion, Caira, Lucius,

Alson Smith Sherman (April 21, 1811 – September 22, 1903) served as Mayor of Chicago, Illinois (1844–1845) as an Independent Democrat.

== Biography ==
Sherman was born to Nathanial Sherman and Deborah (Webster) on April 21, 1811, in Barre, Vermont.

Sherman established the first sawmill in Chicago and served as the city's first iceman.

In the three years before he was elected mayor, Sherman served as chief of Chicago's fire department.

In 1844, Sherman ran for mayor of Chicago after an initial election was invalidated based on charges of "illegal proceedings and fraud." He ran as an Independent Democratic nominee against incumbent Democrat Augustus Garrett and Liberty Party nominee Henry Smith, winning the office with just over 50% of the vote.

As mayor, he oversaw the city's purchase of its first piece of fire-fighting equipment and appointed Denis Swenie as fire chief.

In 1849 he won a special election to replace E.H. Chapin, who had resigned from the Chicago City Council, as an alderman for the city's third ward. He won a full term in 1850.

In 1850, he became one of the original trustees of Northwestern University.

He moved to Waukegan, Illinois, in 1856. In the 1870s, when a canal being dug in Lemont, Illinois, revealed Athens marble, Sherman was instrumental in developing the marble quarry there. He died in Waukegan on September 22, 1903, and was buried in Oakwood Cemetery.
