= Benjamin Wright Raymond =

American politician (1801–1883)

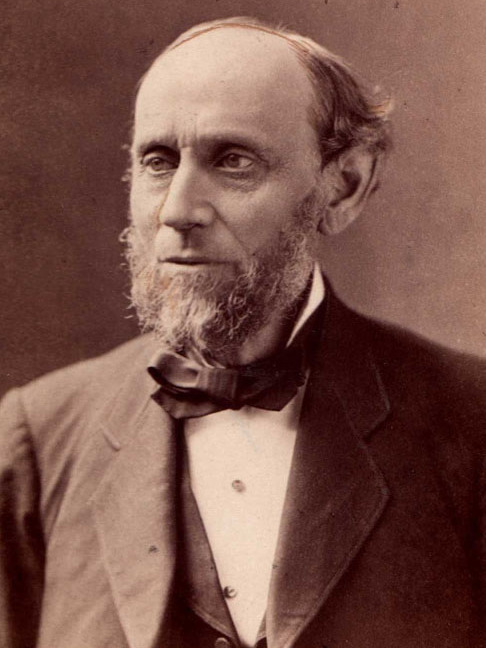

3rd and 6th Mayor of Chicago
- In office 1842–1843
- Preceded by: Francis Cornwall Sherman
- Succeeded by: Augustus Garrett
- In office 1839–1840
- Preceded by: Buckner Stith Morris
- Succeeded by: Alexander Loyd

Chicago Alderman from the 3rd ward
- In office 1847–1848 Serving with J. Brinkerhoff
- Preceded by: James Curtiss/ Michael Kehoe
- Succeeded by: William Jones

Personal details
- Born: June 15, 1801 Rome, New York
- Died: April 6, 1883 (aged 81) Chicago, Illinois
- Resting place: Graceland Cemetery
- Party: Whig
- Spouse: Amelia Porter
- Children: George Lansing Raymond

Benjamin Wright Raymond (June 15, 1801 – April 6, 1883) was an American politician who twice served as mayor of Chicago, Illinois (1839–1840, 1842–1843) for the Whig Party.

== Early life ==
Raymond was born in Rome, New York to Benjamin and Hannah Raymond, taking his middle name from his mother's maiden name. Raymond was educated at St. Lawrence Academy in Potsdam, New York as well as in Montreal, Quebec, Canada. He returned to East Bloomfield, New York and worked as a merchant before deciding to try his luck in real estate in Chicago in 1836 with the backing of his friend, Simon Newton Dexter. In 1835, he married Amelia Porter, the step-daughter of Judge Josiah Porter of East Bloomfield.

== Political career ==
Raymond was twice elected mayor of Chicago. In 1839, he was elected the city's third mayor, defeating James Curtiss. He unsuccessfully sought reelection in 1840, losing to Alexander Loyd. In 1842, he was elected to a second term as Chicago's sixth mayor, defeating the incumbent, Francis Cornwall Sherman. At the time, mayoral terms were one year.

During his terms as mayor, Raymond ensured that State Street would be a wide thoroughfare. During his first year in office, he secured the site of Fort Dearborn for the city of Chicago when it was sold by the federal government.

From 1847 through 1848, Raymond served as alderman from the 3rd ward on the Chicago Common Council.

== Business career ==
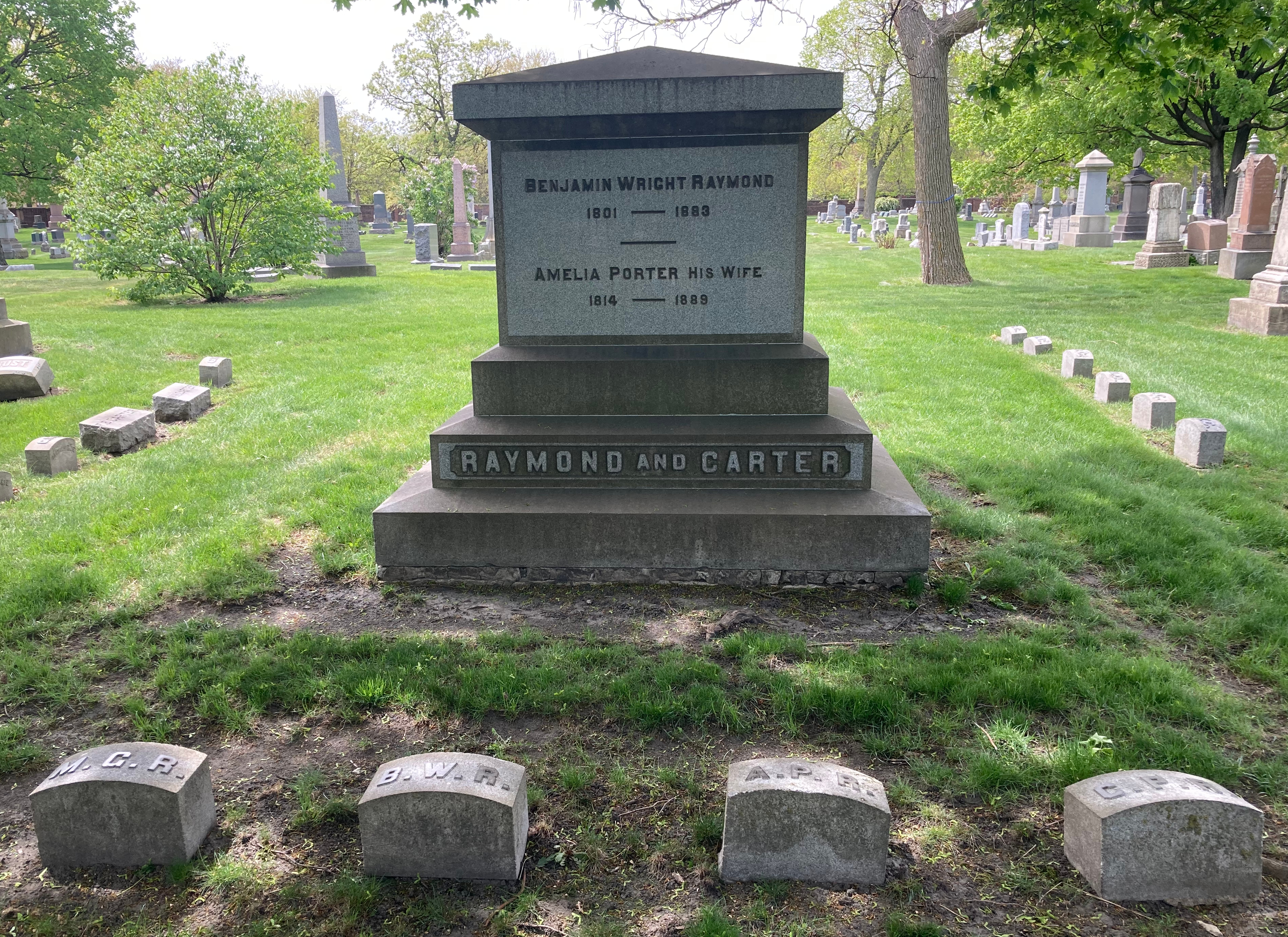
Raymond's grave at Graceland Cemetery

In 1843, after finishing his second term as Mayor, Raymond and Dexter built the first woolen factory in Illinois, in Elgin. Raymond also served as the president of the Fox River Railroad, which connected Elgin to Lake Geneva, Wisconsin. In the 1850s, he was instrumental in securing the charter for Lake Forest University and building the city of Lake Forest, Illinois.

In 1864, approached by J.C. Adams of the Waltham Watch Company, Raymond agreed to put up the money to start a watch company in the Midwest. The men elected to build the company in Elgin, which donated 35 acres (140,000 m^{2}) of land to the entrepreneurs. The building was completed in 1866 and housed the Elgin Watch Company. The first model the company made was named the B.W. Raymond.

Raymond is buried in Graceland Cemetery, Chicago.
