= John Wentworth (Illinois politician) =

American newspaper editor and politician (1815–1888)

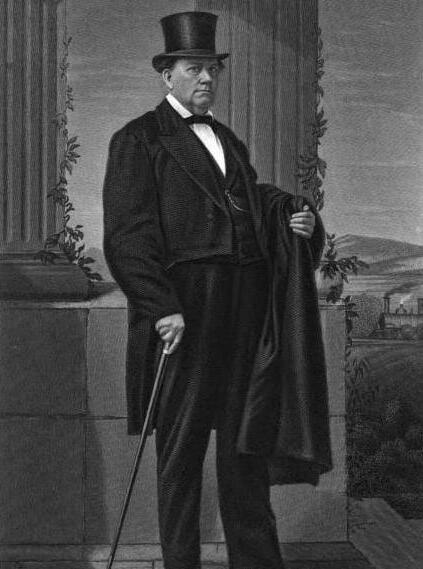
- Illustrated portrait of Wentworth

19th & 21st Mayor of Chicago
- In office March 22, 1860 – May 6, 1861
- Preceded by: John Charles Haines
- Succeeded by: Julian Sidney Rumsey
- In office March 10, 1857 – March 2, 1858
- Preceded by: Thomas Dyer
- Succeeded by: John Charles Haines

Member of the U.S. House of Representatives from Illinois
- In office March 4, 1865 – March 3, 1867
- Preceded by: Isaac N. Arnold
- Succeeded by: Norman B. Judd
- Constituency: 1st
- In office March 4, 1853 – March 3, 1855
- Preceded by: Willis Allen
- Succeeded by: James Hutchinson Woodworth
- Constituency: 2nd
- In office March 4, 1843 – March 3, 1851
- Preceded by: District created
- Succeeded by: Richard S. Molony
- Constituency: 4th

Personal details
- Born: March 5, 1815 Sandwich, New Hampshire, U.S.
- Died: October 16, 1888 (aged 73) Chicago, Illinois, U.S.
- Party: Democratic (1843–1855); Republican (1857)
- Spouse: Roxanna Marie Loomis

John Wentworth (March 5, 1815 – October 16, 1888), was the editor of the Chicago Democrat, publisher of an extensive Wentworth family genealogy, a two-term mayor of Chicago, and a six-term member of the United States House of Representatives (serving tenured in that body both before and after his service as mayor).

After growing up in New Hampshire, he joined the migration west and moved to the developing city of Chicago in 1836, where he made his adult life. Wentworth was affiliated with the Democratic Party until 1855; then he changed to the Republican Party. After retiring from politics, he wrote a three-volume genealogy of the Wentworth family in the United States.

A 1994 survey of experts on Chicago politics assessed Wentworth as one of the ten best mayors in the city's history (up to that time). (Note: The others in the top-ten were Anton Cermak (mayor 1931–33); Richard J. Daley (mayor 1955–76); Richard M. Daley (then-incumbent mayor since 1989); Edward Fitzsimmons Dunne (mayor 1905–07); Carter Harrison III (mayor 1879–1887 and 1893); Carter Harrison IV (mayor 1897–1905 and 1911–15); Edward Joseph Kelly (mayor 1933–47); William B. Ogden (mayor 1837–38); Harold Washington (mayor 1983–87))

== Early life and education ==
John Wentworth was born in Sandwich, New Hampshire. He was educated at the New Hampton Literary Institute and at the academy of Dudley Leavitt. Known as "Long John" he was 6 foot 6 inches in height. He graduated from Dartmouth College in 1836.

== Migration west and career ==
Later that year, Wentworth joined a migration west and moved to Chicago, arriving in the city on October 25, 1836. He became managing editor of Chicago's first newspaper, the Chicago Democrat, eventually becoming its owner and publisher. He owned the paper for 25 years.

Wentworth was admitted to the bar in 1841.

He started a law practice and entered politics. He was a business partner of Illinois financier Jacob Bunn, and the two men were two of the incorporators of the Chicago Secure Depository Company.

== Marriage and family ==
In 1844, he married Roxanna Marie Loomis.

In later years, his nephew Moses J. Wentworth handled his business affairs, and would eventually manage his estate as well.

== Political career ==
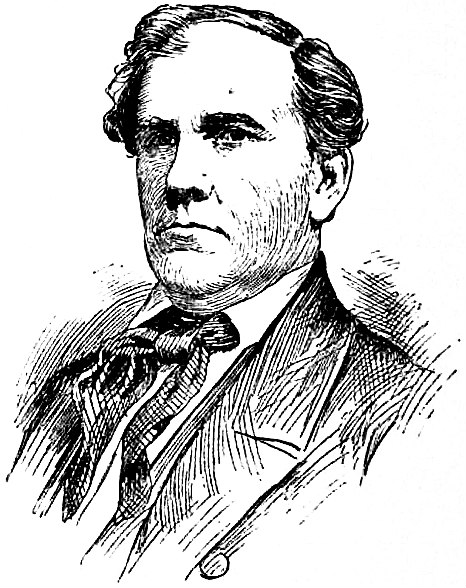
Illustration of Wentworth

Wentworth served two separate one-year terms as mayor of Chicago (1857–1858 and 1860–1861) as well as three separate stints in the United States House of Representatives totaling six terms (1843–1851; 1853–1855; 1865–1867). The first five of his congressional terms were as a Democrat, while the final was as a Republican. His first mayoral term was as a Republican, while his second was as a Democrat.

=== Early political career ===
Wentworth started his political involvement as a Jacksonian democrat, and promoted these views in the Chicago Democrat. After he supported the 1837 mayoral candidacy of William Ogden, including throwing the newspaper behind Ogden's candidacy, he was appointed by Odgen to serve in the post of city printer.

=== U.S. Congressman from Illinois's 4th district (1843–1851) ===
Wentworth, having become active in Democratic politics, was elected in 1842 to represent Illinois's 4th congressional district in the U.S. House of Representatives. He took office in March 1843. He was re-elected in 1844, 1846, and 1848.

=== U.S. Congressman from Illinois's 2nd district (1853–1855) ===
Wentworth returned to the U.S. House of Representatives in March 1853, having been elected in 1852 to represent Illinois's 2nd congressional district. He did not run for re-election 1854, and left office in March 1855.

According to city historians in Sandwich, Illinois, Wentworth was one of the key individuals who was responsible for the city getting a railroad stop. The town, which at the time, was called "Newark Station", was given the station, and in turn, the town gave Wentworth the honor of naming the town, which he subsequently named after his hometown, Sandwich, New Hampshire. It is also to note that the boundary line dispute with Wisconsin would have cut through present-day Sandwich, as it straddles the northern border with neighboring LaSalle County, which would have been the State Line had Wentworth not been successful in moving the line north

=== Chicago mayoralties (1857–1858; 1860–1861) ===
Wentworth returned to Chicago and affiliated with the Republican Party. Running as a Republican, he elected the mayor of Chicago in 1857. He served two terms, 1857–1858 and 1860–1861 (being elected to his second term in the 1860 Chicago mayoral election). In his second term, he again affiliated with the Democratic Party.

As mayor Wentworth instituted the use of chain gangs of prisoners in the city as laborers.

In July 1857, while serving as mayor of Chicago, Wentworth was charged with assaulting an attorney named Charles Cameron, who was attempting to communicate with his incarcerated client. Cameron testified that Wentworth "seized him by the coat collar and shirt bosom" and forcibly removed him from the prison, alleging that he had resisted officers. Wentworth, after requesting the case be delayed twice, refused to appear in court. The Judge found in favor of Cameron and charged Wentworth amounts of $25 "and costs" of $200.

In his effort to clean up the city's morals, he hired spies to determine who was frequenting Chicago's brothels. In 1857, Wentworth led a raid on "the Sands," Chicago's red-light district, which resulted in the burning of the area.

In 1862, many of the city's Republicans had hoped to nominate him as the Republican nominee for mayor, but Charles N. Holden successfully defeated these efforts and secured the nomination for himself.

A 1994 survey of experts on Chicago politics saw Wentworth ranked as one of the ten best mayors in the city's history (up to that time).

=== U.S. Congressman from Illinois's 1st district (1865–1867) ===
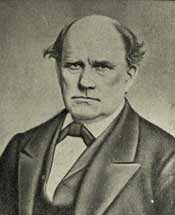
Print of Wentworth

In 1864, Wentworth ran for Congress as a Republican, and was elected for his last term (serving March 4, 1865 – March 3, 1867) representing Illinois's 1st congressional district. While he was in the House, there was a controversial vote to settle a boundary issue between Wisconsin and Illinois, with Wisconsin claiming land as far as the tip of Lake Michigan. Wentworth was promised that if he voted to give the land including Chicago to Wisconsin, he would be appointed to the US Senate. Wentworth declined the offer.

=== Chicago Board of Education (1860–1863; 1867–1871) ===
From 1860 until 1863, Wentworth served on the Chicago Board of Education. Wentworth again served on the Chicago Board of Education from 1867 until 1871. Per some sources, he was board president in 1869, while other sources name S.A. Briggs as having held the office that year instead.

== Later life ==
After retiring from Congress, beginning in 1868 Wentworth lived at his country estate at 5441 South Harlem Avenue in Chicago. He owned about 5,000 acres (20 km^{2}) of land in what is today part of the Chicago neighborhood of Garfield Ridge and suburban Summit.

When an author left a manuscript of a history of Chicago with Wentworth for his suggestions, he reportedly removed what did not refer to him and returned the manuscript to its author with the note, "Here is your expurgated and correct history of Chicago."

== Family historian ==
Wentworth researched and wrote The Wentworth Genealogy – English and American twice, which he published privately. The first two-volume edition, also known as the "private edition", published in 1871, was followed by a second, corrected, edition in 1878, which was published in three volumes, for a total of 2241 pages. The total reported cost for both editions was $40,000. The first of the 1878 volumes chronicles the ancestry of Elder William Wentworth, the first of this family in New England, and his first five generations of New World descendants. The second and third volumes discuss the "Elder's" many descendants and others of the name. John was a fourth great-grandson of William.

== Death ==
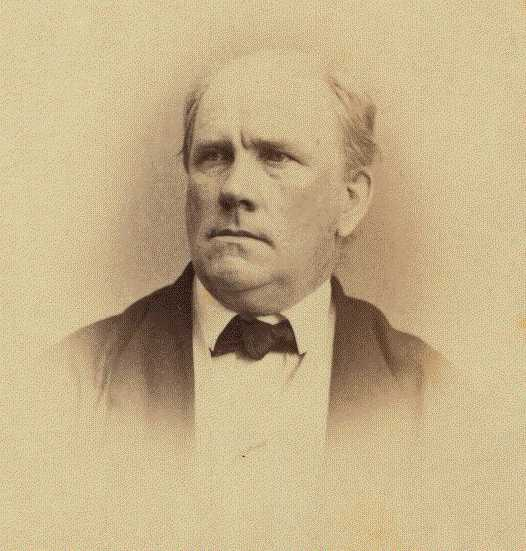
Photograph of Wentworth

Wentworth died at his estate in 1888, aged 73. He was buried in Rosehill Cemetery in Chicago.

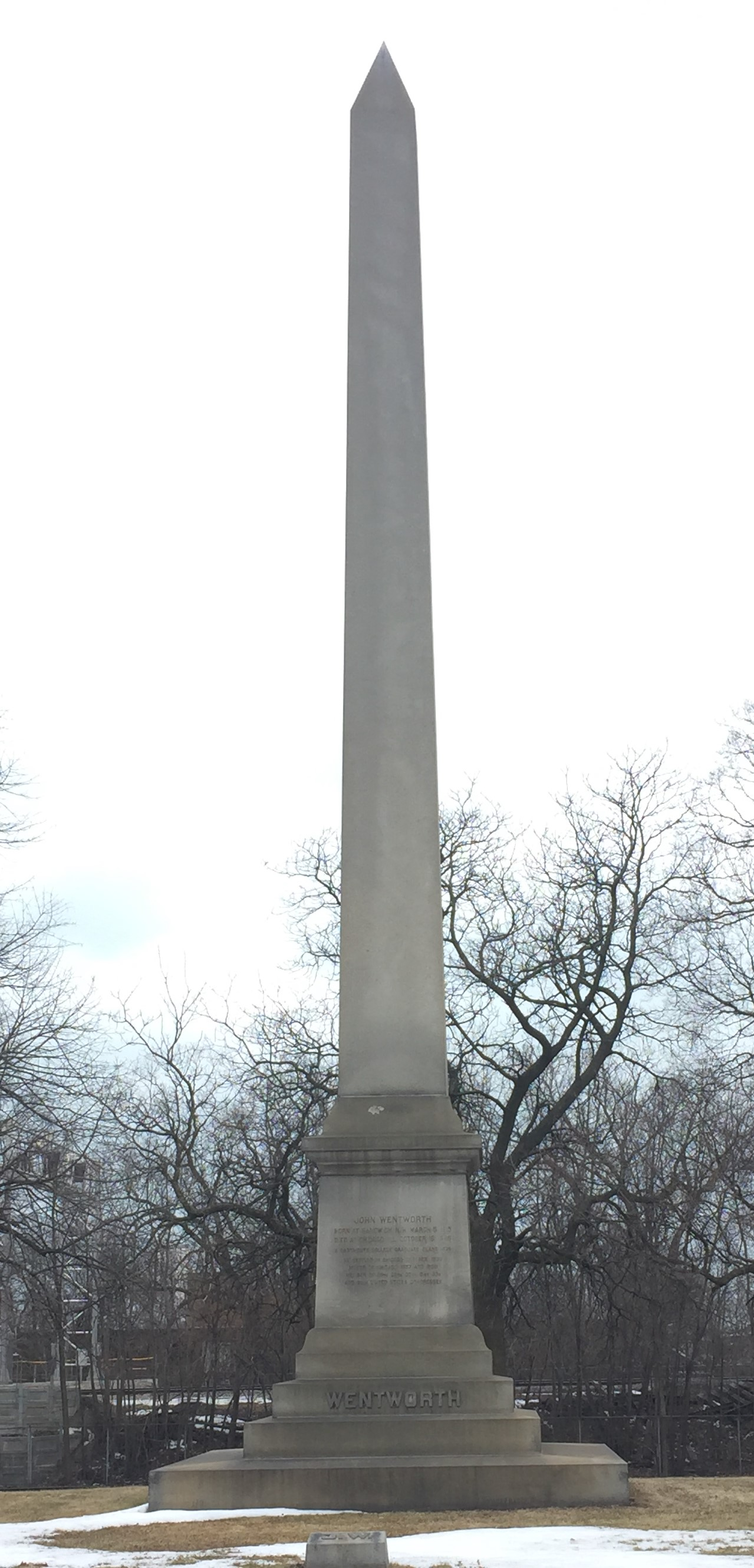
Wentworth's tombstone, photographed in 2020

At his request, his tombstone was a sixty-foot tall granite obelisk that was imported from New Hampshire on two railroad cars. It was, at the time, the tallest tombstone in the west.

== See also ==
- The Wentworth Letter

== Works cited ==
- Merriner, James (2004). Grafters and Goo Goos: Corruption and Reform in Chicago, 1833-2003. Southern Illinois University Press. ISBN 0809325713.

U.S. House of Representatives
Preceded by District created	Member of the U.S. House of Representatives from Illinois's 4th congressional district 1843–1851	Succeeded by Richard S. Molony
Preceded by Willis Allen	Member of the U.S. House of Representatives from Illinois's 2nd congressional district 1853–1855	Succeeded by James H. Woodworth
Preceded by Isaac N. Arnold	Member of the U.S. House of Representatives from Illinois's 1st congressional district 1865–1867	Succeeded by Norman B. Judd
Party political offices
Preceded by Marcus D. Gilman	Democratic nominee for Mayor of Chicago; 1860	Succeeded by Thomas Barbour Bryan
