= 1851 Chicago mayoral election =

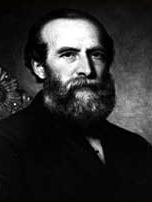

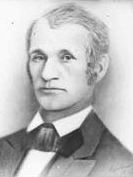
Candidate	Walter S. Gurnee	Eli B. Williams	James Curtiss
Party	Democratic		Democratic
Popular vote	3,032	1,092	1,001
Percentage	56.66%	20.41%	18.71%
Mayor before election
James Curtiss
Democratic
Elected mayor
Walter S. Gurnee
Democratic

In the 1851 Chicago mayoral election, Walter S. Gurnee defeated incumbent mayor James Curtiss as well as Eli B. Williams and Edward K. Rogers by a landslide 36.25% margin.

The Whig Party decided against nominating a ticket in the 1851 Chicago municipal elections.

== Results ==
Gurnee defeated incumbent Democrat James Curtiss as well as Eli B. Williams and Edward K. Rogers.

Owing to a large number of the city's residents not being in compliance with new election laws, an unprecedented number of prospective voters were refused tickets.

Gurnee received a plurality of votes from all major political parties. It is believed that his vote total from Whigs was as great as his vote total from Democrats. Many political analysts treated the election (which unseated incumbent Democrat James Curtiss) as a "Whig Party victory".

1851 Chicago mayoral election
Party	Candidate	Votes	%
Democratic	Walter S. Gurnee	3,032	56.66
	Eli B. Williams	1,092	20.41
Democratic	James Curtiss (incumbent)	1,001	18.71
	Edward K. Rogers	226	4.22
Turnout		5,351	
