= 1852 Chicago mayoral election =

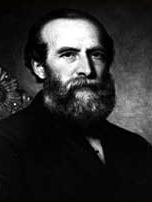

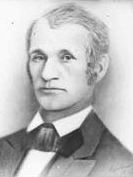

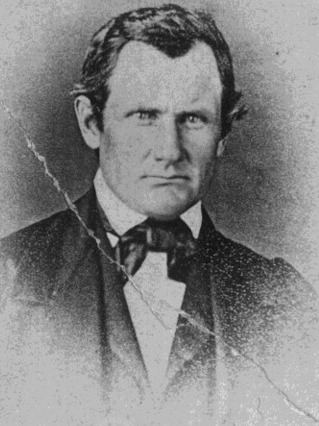

Candidate	Walter S. Gurnee	James Curtiss
Party	Democratic	Independent
Popular vote	1,741	1,295
Percentage	39.04%	29.05%
Candidate	Amos G. Throop	Peter Page
Party	Temperance	Mechanics
Popular vote	1,153	271
Percentage	25.85%	6.08%
Mayor before election
Walter S. Gurnee
Democratic
Elected mayor
Walter S. Gurnee
Democratic

In the 1852 Chicago mayoral election, incumbent Democrat Walter S. Gurnee defeated former mayor James Curtiss (running as an independent) as well as Temperance candidate Amos G. Throop and Mechanics candidate Peter Page by a ten-point margin.

== Campaign ==
B.W. Raymond was the initial nominee of the Temperance (Prohibition) Party. However, for unspecified reasons, his candidacy was withdrawn in late February in favor of Throop.

The election was an energetic one, particularly due to the debate over liquor.

Other issues that were debated in the election were the reduction of taxes, avoiding an increase in city debt, preventing lawyers from obtaining gratuities, eliminating connection between the city government and private corporations, and suffrage.

It was alleged during the campaign that a candidate in the previous election had spent $3,000 in buying voters liquor.

== Results ==
1852 Chicago mayoral election
Party	Candidate	Votes	%
Democratic	Walter S. Gurnee (incumbent)	1,741	39.04
Independent politician	James Curtiss	1,295	29.05
Temperance Party	Amos G. Throop	1,153	25.85
Mechanics	Peter Page	271	6.08
Turnout		4,460	
