= James Hutchinson Woodworth =

American politician (1804–1869)

James H. Woodworth
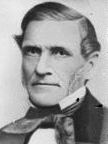

Member of the U.S. House of Representatives from Illinois's 2nd district
- In office March 4, 1855 – March 3, 1857
- Preceded by: John Wentworth
- Succeeded by: John F. Farnsworth

12th Mayor of Chicago
- In office March 14, 1848 – March 12, 1850
- Preceded by: James Curtiss
- Succeeded by: James Curtiss

Member of the Chicago City Council from the 1st ward
- In office 1845–1848 Serving with Peter Updike
- Preceded by: Levi Boone/ George Manierre
- Succeeded by: Edward Manierre

Member of the Illinois House of Representatives
- In office 1842–1847

Member of the Illinois State Senate
- In office 1839–1842

Personal details
- Born: December 4, 1804 Greenwich, New York, U.S.
- Died: March 26, 1869 (aged 64) Chicago, Illinois, U.S.
- Resting place: Oak Woods Cemetery
- Party: Independent Democrat
- Other political affiliations: Republican
- Spouse: Almyra Booth
- Children: Virginia W Van Wyck, Julia M, Lucius B

James Hutchinson Woodworth (December 4, 1804 – March 26, 1869), was a member of the Illinois State Senate and the Illinois State House of Representatives, served as a Chicago Alderman, was elected to consecutive terms as Mayor of Chicago, Illinois (1848–1850) as an Independent Democrat, and served one term in the US House of Representatives as a member of the Republican Party. Woodworth completed his career in Chicago as one of the city's most noteworthy bankers. He is a member of the Woodworth political family.

== Personal life ==
Woodworth's grave (rear center) at Oak Woods Cemetery

He was born in Greenwich in Washington County, New York, the son of Connecticut natives Eleazer Woodworth and Catherine Rock Woodworth. His father died when Woodworth was young. He received limited schooling and completed his formal education by the time he was 14. Woodworth's various brothers figured prominently in his life. At various times, they provided employment, provided training or other support for career changes, and served as business partners. Woodworth's life illustrated a steady progression westward as the center of the United States was opened after the Louisiana Purchase. He eventually settled in Chicago and was instrumental in insuring its place as the nation's most prominent midwestern trading city.

In Chicago, Woodworth married Almyra Booth, the daughter of Walter Booth of Paris, Illinois. She was a member of the Booth family that settled in Indiana from their homes in Connecticut; their American ancestry stretched back to the founder of Connecticut, the Reverend Thomas Hooker. The Booth family was noted for its interest in public service, and this both influenced and supported Woodworth's own career in politics. Almyra Booth was related to both California Governor Newton Booth and the author Booth Tarkington. Woodworth and Almyra Booth had three children, two of whom died in infancy. Their daughter Virginia Almyra Woodworth was married to Tunis B. Van Wyck whose own ancestry could be traced back to the earliest inhabitants of the Dutch colonies in the New World, including the New Amsterdam and Long Island colonies which eventually became New York State. Through Virginia Van Wyck, the Woodworths had one surviving grandchild, Virginia Almyra Van Wyck who married George Pope of Glencoe, Illinois.

Woodworth is buried in the Oak Woods Cemetery in Chicago, together with his wife Almyra, their three of his children and a brother, Frank L. Woodworth.

== Early business career ==
Woodworth began his career by helping his older brother run the family farm in Washington County, New York. When Woodworth was 19 his brother arranged the exchange of the family farm in Washington County, NY for a farm in Onondaga County, New York. He continued to work on the new family farm in Onondaga County, New York, for his brother until he was 21. In his last two years of farming in Onondaga County, we worked to clear land and erect buildings on a tract of land known at the time as the "Indian Reservation."

Upon leaving farming, he struck out initially to run a dry goods business. Despite his limited education, he became a school teacher in the local school district of Fabius, New York. In 1826, he was appointed inspector of the common schools. He briefly considered a career as a physician while working for another brother, Dr Robert P. Woodworth. In 1827, he decided to work along the Erie Canal. There he and another Woodworth brother operated a small scale dry goods or trading business and lived in Erie, Pennsylvania. From 1829 to 1832, he served as a justice of the peace in Pennsylvania.

Woodworth arrived in Chicago in 1833, the first year of its incorporation as a city in Cook County, when its population totaled 500. He immediately began operating a dry goods business which continued until 1840. In 1835, while operating his dry goods business, he applied for, and received, wharfing privileges. He eventually contracted to work on the construction of the Illinois and Michigan Canal. He briefly left Chicago for Marseilles, LaSalle County, Illinois, to oversee his interest in saw-mills; the Marseilles mills were considered among the most advanced mills of their time. He returned to Chicago in 1842 when the mills were destroyed in a fire. His business endeavors in this period sometimes included other business partners such as one of his brothers, Dr. Robert P. Woodworth. After he returned from LaSalle County he purchased a flouring milling operation that was connected to the pumps and reservoirs of the Chicago Hydraulic Co. He was invited at various times to serve the community in a series of elected political offices.

== Political life ==
Woodworth began his political career in Chicago in 1839. He first served in the Illinois State Senate from 1839 to 1842, when he was elected to fill a vacancy from the Chicago district. He then served in the Illinois House of Representatives from 1842 to 1847, representing LaSalle, Grundy, and Kendall counties.

He was a Chicago Alderman, serving as a member of the Chicago City Council, known then as the Common Council, from 1845 to 1848. He ran for mayor in 1848 and was elected in a landslide, and then was re-elected for a second consecutive term with a substantial majority in the face of limited organized opposition. He was the first politician elected to two successive mayoral terms in Chicago.

=== Mayor of Chicago ===
Woodworth ran for mayor as an Independent Democrat during a period when the national political parties, the Whigs and the Democrats, experienced great upheaval. His Mayoral campaign represented a stunning blow to the Democratic party of Chicago, unseating the Democratic Party's Mayor, James Curtiss; it would take the Democrats and Curtiss two full election cycles to regain the Mayoral office. The short lived Independent Democrats of Chicago is an early example of a successful large city "fusion party."

Woodworth was sworn in as mayor on March 14, 1848.

As mayor, Woodworth presided over the opening of the Illinois and Michigan Canal on April 16, 1848. Woodworth was instrumental in opening Chicago to all major railroads. His political opponents had preferred restricting the railroads' access to Chicago; the more liberal policy adopted by Woodworth, which permitted each railroad to have its own terminal in addition to access, enhanced the position of Chicago as a central trading location for the entire Midwest. He also facilitated the installation of telegraph lines to the west; on January 15, 1848, the first telegraph message to be received in Chicago was sent from Milwaukee, Wisconsin, and received in Chicago, Illinois. By 1849, Woodworth's pro-commerce policies had established Chicago as an outfitting center for gold seekers heading west to seek their fortunes. During his terms the city's population grew to 20,000. By the end of his two mayoral terms Chicago had been transformed from a bustling frontier trading town to one of the major centers of commerce in the Midwest with a major stake in the opening of the West to the entire country.

During Woodworth's terms as Mayor, Chicago was challenged by a series of disasters. The first disaster was an outbreak of cholera; Woodworth responded to the cholera epidemic by building a municipal sewer system. On March 12, 1849, there was a great flood caused by excess ice on the waterways. On July 21, 1849, Chicago was ravaged by a major fire which destroyed Tremont House in addition to a sizable number of other buildings.

Woodworth's two inaugural addresses displayed consistent attention to several issues central to the development of Chicago. He voiced concern over the city's deficit financial position and in his second term shored up the finances through new loans. He requested additional funding for the Fire Department, the employment of physicians in the city's hospitals, repairs and improvements to the city's roads, waterways and wharfing facilities, the city jail, the city cemetery and the Chicago Public School system.

In 1850, as Mayor, he presided over a meeting of anti-slavery citizens who voted a resolution to declare their "utter abhorrence at all compromises that permitted the further extension of human slavery; condemning a compromise scheme attributed to Douglas by the press."

His tenure ended on March 12, 1850, when he was succeeded in office by James Curtiss.

=== U.S. House of Representatives ===
In Illinois, the Whigs eventually became the Republican Party. Woodworth held anti-slavery views, and the short-lived fusion Independent Democratic party he headed in Chicago merged with the Whigs to form the Illinois Republican Party. Woodworth did not stand for re-election in 1850 and returned briefly to private life as a banker in Chicago, but returned to public service in 1853, serving as the Water Commissioner, until his election to the United States Congress in the elections of 1854. He served one term as the Representative of the Second District of Illinois in the 34th United States Congress from 1855 to 1857 and there served as a member of the Republican Party. At the end of his term in Congress, Woodworth did not stand for re-election, stated that he sought "a release from public cares," and returned to private life in Chicago for the second time in his life as a banker.

== Later business career ==
Finance and banking became a growth industry in its own right in the city's continued rapid expansion as a major Midwest trading center. The status of Chicago as a financial center was challenged in the 1850s as there were many "runs on banks" and several outright bank failures.

=== Merchants & Mechanics Bank of Chicago ===
After his consecutive terms as Mayor of Chicago, Woodworth served as President of the Merchants & Mechanics Bank of Chicago. His appointment to the bank is noteworthy as commentators of the day ascribed the bank's return to health, and even vigorous success, during a time of banking crisis, to Woodworth's character and the benefits of his great many personal business relationships in the Chicago trading community. He buttressed the bank's finances at one point in 1852 by taking a $50,000 loan from his father-in-law Walter Booth, the one time Mayor of Paris, Illinois. Booth's loan to the bank was secured by the "current worth of the owners of the Merchants' Bank." His tenure at this bank ended in 1855 when he took his seat in Congress.

=== Treasury Bank of Chicago ===
After his term in Congress, he returned to banking in Chicago and became the President of the Treasury Bank of Chicago. During the Civil War Woodworth remained a private citizen and, as can be verified by his public record, held neither elected political office nor military position. Woodworth accepted a part-time appointment from Illinois Governor Richard Yates to oversee federal financial transfers to the state during the Civil War as a member of the Board of Auditors of War Claims, known also as the Commissioners of the War Fund. The War Fund and the Board of Army Auditors were authorized under a special session of the Illinois General Assembly. This was a role Woodworth played while principally occupied at the Treasury Bank of Chicago. He continued as President of this bank until his death.

== Legacy ==
Many landmarks and institutions remain in Chicago reflecting his career contributions. It is a testament to his popularity that he counted working relationships with both Democrat and Republican politicians of the Civil War and mid-19th century era in Chicago:

=== Civil War Era in Chicago ===
Mayor Woodworth did not serve in the military during the Civil War; and, by the time of the war, had returned permanently to commerce as a banker. Nonetheless, he had accepted a civilian war time appointment on the Board of Auditors of War Claims from Governor Yates, a Republican. As a banker, Woodworth worked at the forefront of Municipal Finance to develop Chicago's infrastructure, including one of the largest military prisons for captured Confederate troops. His strict anti-slavery views stemmed from the perspective that the economic future of Chicago as a great metropolitan center was best advanced where all residents were free and able to seek a role in the commerce of the city; this popular metropolitan perspective on slavery contrasted with the agrarian perspective popular in the Confederate states where slavery was considered a necessary aspect of the farming economy.

=== Higher Education in Chicago ===
Despite his own limited education, Woodworth showed a keen interest in education as Mayor seeking funding for the public schools of the city. Later, as a leading banker in Chicago, Woodworth dedicated much of this time to the creation of Chicago's first university, now known as "Old" Chicago University. His partner in this endeavor was Stephen A. Douglas, possibly the most prominent Democrat of his era, Woodworth was a founding trustee of Chicago University and later served at its treasurer. Chicago University was the precursor to the University of Chicago and to Northwestern University's School of Law. As university trustee, and its treasurer, he was credited with financially sustaining the university during its early years when its finances were precarious. The financial failure of Chicago University was linked to Mayor Woodworth's untimely death. A bankruptcy reorganization following his death allowed the books, land and some buildings of Chicago University to re-emerge as the new University of Chicago. As part of that reorganization, the law school of Chicago University, Chicago's first law school, became the Law School of Northwestern University.

=== Chicago as the Midwestern Center of Commerce ===
Woodworth presided over several events that cemented Chicago's position in the nation's economy. As Mayor he pushed aside various municipal factions that opposed the presence of railroads in the city center, to allow all railroads serving Chicago to be served by a central railroad station; this permitted efficient transfer of cargo between the various railroads. Woodworth assured the position of Chicago as a trading center by supporting the Illinois and Michigan Canal, and strengthening the Chicago waterways and wharfing systems against flooding and inclement winter weather. Chicago's transportation system became unique in the Midwest as railroad and water traffic met in a central city location. The first telegraph message was received in Chicago when Woodworth was mayor, and the first commodity futures contracts began trading on Chicago exchanges at this time. As a private banker, Woodworth's successful bank positioned Chicago as a central national banking center, well before the United States established the current national system of Federal Reserve banks, and during a period where bank failures were frequent.

=== Development of Modern Chicago ===
Chicago's population grew dramatically during Woodworth's tenure are Mayor and during the periods where he was active in commerce. He presided over the opening of Bridgeport, Chicago, the new residential area of Chicago that has been home to several Chicago Mayors.

=== Lincoln funeral ===
Woodworth was a contemporary, and friend, of Abraham Lincoln. Woodworth permitted his Independent Democrat party of Chicago to join with the Whig Party of Illinois to form the Illinois Republicans. This gave the Illinois GOP the depth in voters, financial support, and a strong base in Chicago, needed to support Lincoln's ascendance to the Presidency. Although he was not one of the 12 Chicago pallbearers, Woodworth did serve as a member of Chicago's Committee of One Hundred, which marched in the funeral cortege of Abraham Lincoln during its passage through Chicago, on its way to Springfield, Illinois.

=== Chicago Astronomical Society ===
He also served as a founding trustee of the Chicago Astronomical Society, an appointment made under the Society's act of incorporation passed by the Illinois General Assembly; a full copy of the act of incorporation can be found on the Society's website.

=== James Woodworth Prairie Preserve ===
In more recent years, his grandson, John Woodworth Leslie, was instrumental in saving a virgin prairie preserve near Chicago to serve as an historical reminder of how the region appeared when Woodworth was mayor. That prairie preserve is known as the "James Woodworth Prairie Preserve," or the "Woodworth prairie." It is located off Milwaukee Avenue in Glenview, Illinois. The University of Illinois at Chicago and its Department of Biological Sciences oversee the prairie. The prairie covers "5 acres... of original tallgrass prairie... [and]... the only natural area owned by the University of Illinois at Chicago.... [The Woodworth prairie] serves the community by providing an opportunity to experience prairie plants and animals that are now rare... [and it provides] a challenge to understand how communities can be preserved."

U.S. House of Representatives
Preceded by John Wentworth	Member of the U.S. House of Representatives from Illinois's 2nd congressional district 1855–1857	Succeeded by John F. Farnsworth
