= 1893 Chicago mayoral special election =

- December 19, 1893
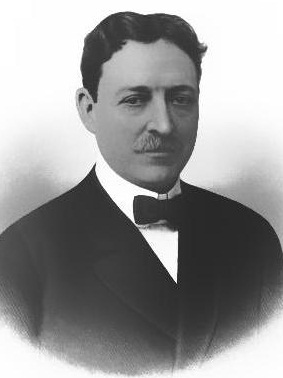

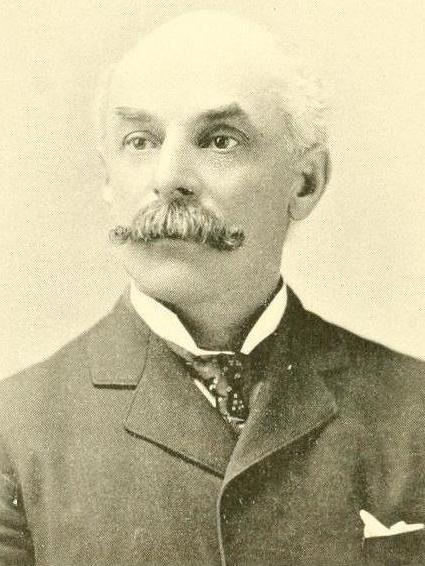
Nominee	John Patrick Hopkins	George Bell Swift
Party	Democratic	Republican
Popular vote	112,959	111,660
Percentage	49.71%	49.14%
Mayor before election
George Bell Swift (acting mayor)
Republican
Elected mayor
John Patrick Hopkins
Democratic

In the Chicago mayoral special election of 1893, John Patrick Hopkins was elected mayor. The election was triggered by the assassination of mayor Carter Harrison Sr. (a Democrat that had been elected to his fifth non-consecutive term earlier that year). Following Harrison's death, Republican George Bell Swift had been elected by City Council to serve as acting mayor until the special election could be held. In the election, which was held December 19, Hopkins narrowly defeated Swift by a half-percent margin.

Ahead of the general election, Hopkins was challenged for the Democratic Party's nomination by John A. King, Frank Wenter (the president of the Sanitary District of Chicago), John C. Black (a U.S. congressman and retired general). In an indirect primary, convention delegates supporting Hopkins won a clear victory over delegates supporting other candidates, and Hopkins defeated King and Wenter in the roll call vote at the Democratic Party's convention. Acting Mayor Swift had an easy path to the Republican nomination at his party's convention.

== Background ==
After the assassination of mayor Cater Harrison Sr., George Bell Swift was appointed interim mayor by the Chicago City Council.

While Swift had originally pledged to only be an interim mayor, it quickly became evident that he intended to seek the office permanently. After taking office, Swift both began appointing Republicans to as many offices as he could, and allowed his political allies to build him a campaign organization.

The election was held amid a nationwide economic depression.

Democratic Party support had declined since the beginning of the economic downturn the nation was experiencing. This was evidenced roughly a month before the election, when Republicans swept the November 7 county judicial elections. However, this was result was largely attributable to a lopsided vote in favor of the Republicans in suburban Cook County, as Democrats led the portion of vote cast in Chicago city boundaries, albeit with a reduced majority over the previous election.

== Nominations ==
=== Democratic ===
Harrison's death had left Chicago's Democratic Party in search of a leader. Numerous individuals were speculated as potential candidates. Top speculative contenders included President of the Chicago Board of Education A. S. Trude, Sanitary District of Chicago President Frank Wenter (a leading "Harrisonite"), Judge Henry M. Shepard, and Congressman Allan C. Durborow Jr., and businessman and politician John Patrick Hopkins. Others speculated that Harrison's son Carter Harrison Jr. might be a prospect for the nomination. Of those speculated Hopkins was viewed by many as the front-runner from the start, as he was "looked upon with fear and trembling by city hall Democrats." However, the Chicago Tribune considered Trude to be the preferred candidate of Democrats.

With all wanting to avoid being the target of focussed opposition by being the first to make clear their intentions to seek the nomination, no candidates initially openly campaigned for the nomination. Ultimately, for several weeks Trude began to dip his toes in to the race, but formally opted against a run. Trude announced his decision not to run in mid-November. Trude gave the suspect excuse that he would not run, in part, because he believed that if he were the party's nominee that conflict of interest would have forced his brother George to resign his elected position as city attorney because that position made George an ex-officio member of the city's election commission. Because George would presumably be replaced by a Republican (due to the makeup of the city's government and the Republican affiliation of Acting Mayor Swift), Trude argued that it would be problematic because his brother was, "about the only Democrat on that board," and he believed that the Democratic Party's interests would be harmed by ceding that representation on the election commission. As another factor in why he opted against running, Trude cited that he wanted to continue serving on the Chicago Board of Education due to his "deep [interest] in educational matters", and that, if he ran for mayor, he believed that he would be expected to resign from the Chicago Board of Education. The Chicago Tribune reported that some of Trude's strongest supporters would likely support a prospective Hopkins candidacy. However, the newspaper also reporte that, "it is intimated that Mr. Trude does not feel too kindly towards Hopkins, and his personal following is likely to go to John A. King."

Wenter ultimately went all-in as a candidate and campaigned heavily. He was backed by the Chicago Times. Wenter received the backing of Cook County Democratic Party Chairman John McGillen, and was avidly supported by the party's Harrison camp.

John C. Black, a U.S. congressman and retired general, declared himself a candidate for the nomination, and established a campaign headquarters at the Palmer House Hotel in mid-November. However, at the time, the Chicago Tribune opined that, "the Black candidacy is likely to languish."

Hopkins, while publicly admitting interest, did not formally declare himself a candidate until the last minute. However, ward-level organizations supporting his candidacy had been formed even before he formally declared himself a candidate. By not formally entering until late in the race, Hopkins avoided receiving many direct attacks from other candidates. Hopkins also avoided formal support from any one faction of the Democratic Party, hoping to earn the appeal of being perceived as a candidate for all Democrats. As a candidate, Hopkins touted his connections and positive relationship with the administration of President Grover Cleveland, arguing that Chicago would benefit from this relationship if he were their mayor. Hopkins demonstrated his sway with the Cleveland administration by securing his ally Washington Hesing an appointment as Postmaster of Chicago.

In the primary to elect delegates for the city's nominating convention, Hopkins had a clear victory.

In a last minute move, Chairman of the Cook County Democratic Party John McGillen, who supported Wenter, attempted to appoint himself chair of the convention, presumably so that he would be in a position to disqualify Hopkins delegates. However, the party's executive committee overruled this by a vote of 7 to 2.

At the convention, Adolphus W. Green formally placed Hopkins' name for nomination. Also nominated at the convention were Wenter and John A. King. Both Wenter and King received few votes during balloting, and each withdrew their candidacies before the end of the first round of balloting. Robert Emmett "Bobby" Burke moved to nominate Hopkins by acclamation.

=== Republican ===
There was buzz that former mayor John A. Roche might back a challenge by Henry Wulff. However, Swift was ultimately easily nominated at the Republican convention.

== General election ==
After his nomination at the Democratic convention, a five-person committee was created to oversee efforts to support Hopkins' campaign. Members of this committee included Washington Hesing and Frank Lawler (the latter of whom had opposed Hopkins' candidacy before he won the nomination). Hopkins appointed Lambert Tree, a close political ally, as his campaign manager. Hopkins additionally worked with political ally Roger Charles Sullivan and others to plan his campaign. Hopkins also appointed a "field marshal" for each ward. Key members from what remained of the Harrison wing of the party backed his candidacy, such as Frank Wenter and Robert Burke. He also received the backing of reform-minded Democrats such as Clarence S. Darrow.

The Democratic platform called for strict municipal bookkeeping, the elimination of unnecessary city employees, the removal of political influence from policing, and the elevation of railroad tracks to remove at-grade crossings. The Republican platform was nearly identical to it, thus very little substance separated the two parties on key municipal issues during this campaign.

Democrats and Republicans each strongly united behind their candidates.

There as an attempt by Republicans to tie Hopkins to the Wilson–Gorman Tariff Act, then pending before congress. Republicans argued that this act, by lowering tariffs, would negatively affect jobs of working-class men. However, this line of attack appeared to have very little impact.

Two-days before the election, the Chicago Tribune launched a last-minute surprise in an attempt to sway voters by reporting that Hopkins had assisted in securing a city contract for his nephew William A. Lyndon's firm Lyndon & Drews to extend the "Hyde Park tunnel". There were issues with the quality of the job that the firm had completed. The Tribune also alleged that non-union labor had been used on the project. The Tribune, with next to no evidence, implied that Hopkins had profited tremendously from this transaction. This story appeared to have ultimately had little sway on voters, and was largely forgotten about after the election.

=== Results ===
Hopkins won a narrow victory. Hopkins became Chicago's first Irish-American mayor. The city has since elected six additional Irish Catholic mayors.

At 35 years of age when he took office, Hopkins became the youngest mayor the city had ever had.

While the victory was narrow, and showed a marked decline of Democratic support from the regular mayoral election held earlier in the year, it was also a victory that was celebrated by Democrats amid a downturn that had occurred in the party's electoral fortunes amid the nationwide economic downturn.

1893 Chicago mayoral special election
Party	Candidate	Votes	%
Democratic	John Patrick Hopkins	112,959	49.71
Republican	George Bell Swift (incumbent)	111,660	49.14
Socialist Labor	Michael Britzius	2,064	1.30
Populist	Ebenezer Wakeley	535	0.24
Turnout		227,218	

Hopkins received 78.38% of the Polish-American vote, while Swift received 20.80%.
