= 1895 Chicago mayoral election =

- April 2, 1895
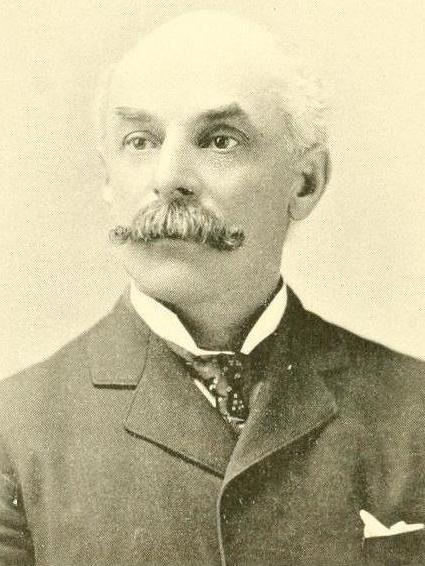

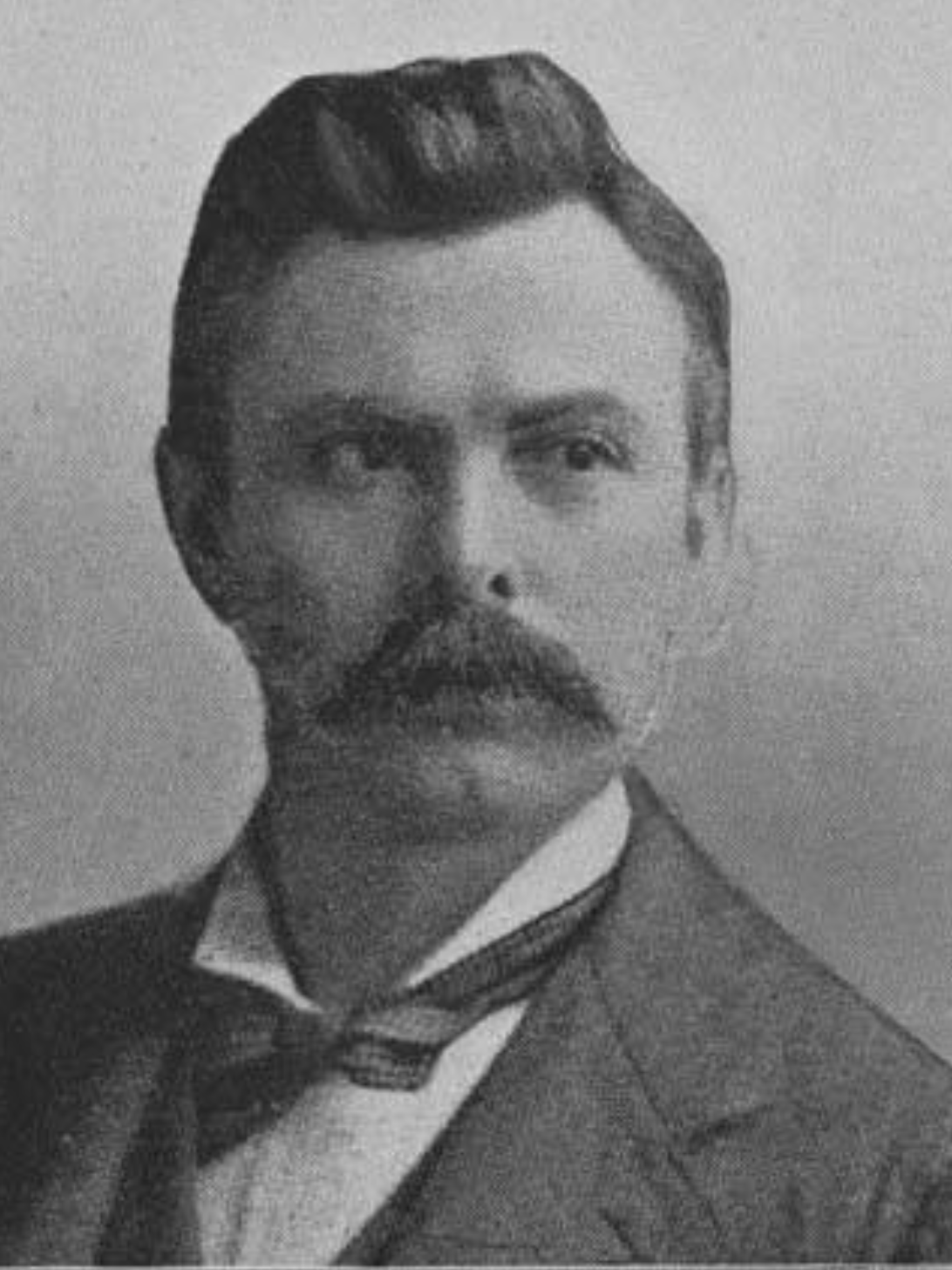

Nominee	George Bell Swift	Frank Wenter	Bayard Holmes
Party	Republican	Democratic	Populist
Popular vote	143,884	103,125	12,882
Percentage	55.09%	39.48%	4.93%
Mayor before election
John Patrick Hopkins
Democratic
Elected mayor
George Bell Swift
Republican

In the Chicago mayoral election of 1895, was held on Tuesday April 2 Republican nominee George Bell Swift (former acting mayor) was elected, winning a majority of the vote and defeating Democratic nominee Frank Wenter (president of the Chicago Sanitary District board) by more than a fifteen-point margin (55.09% to 39.48%). The Populist Party (a briefly-lived major national third party) nominated physician Bayard Holmes, who received 4.93% of the vote.

Incumbent mayor Hopkins, a Democrat who had defeated Hopkins in the 1893 special election, did not seek reelection. Hopkins had been implicated in the Ogden Gas scandal (a political scandal). The Democratic Party was facing a nationwide decline in support due to public sentiment faulting President Grover Cleveland for the Panic of 1893, as well as local backlash over President Cleveland's intervention in the Pullman Strike in Chicago. In addition to Wenter, Washington Hesing (Chicago Postmaster) also initially sought the nomination of the Democratic Party. However, by the time of the party's nominating convention, Wenter had secured enough support to drive Hesing out of the race.

== Background ==
Nationally, amid the Panic of 1893, the Democratic Party had experienced a national decline in support and Republicans a national rise in support. In the 1894 United States elections, Republicans took control of both chambers of US congress from the Democrats. In the United States House of Representatives election, Republicans won what is the largest-ever seat gain in the chamber's history. In Illinois, Republicans won increased majorities in the Illinois General Assembly, and increased their share of Illinois' then-22 US congressional seats from 11 to 20. In the Cook County elections, Republicans won all countywide offices.

In Chicago, the local decline in Democratic support was attributable to both local matters and the overall national decline in support of Democrats. Local matters that contributed to this decline in support included fallout of the Ogden Gas Scandal and an especially strong disapproval in Chicago of Democratic President Grover Cleveland's intervention in the Pullman Strike (which was both a local matter in Chicago as well as a national controversy) and the economic fallout of the Panic of 1893 (which public sentiment faulted Cleveland for).

Incumbent Democratic mayor John Patrick Hopkins's tenure had been marred by numerous scandals, criticisms, and shortcomings. This included incidents political corruption in the city such as the Ogden Gas Scandal, rampant public gambling that drew the ire of the Chicago Civic Federation, an indecisive response by Hopkins to the Pullman Strike that was assailed by Republican press outlets. Additionally, the misappropriation of significant amounts of campaign contributions by Hopkins had upset many in the Chicago Democratic party, including those who belonged to the local party's former Harrison faction.

== Nominations ==
=== Democratic nomination ===
While Democratic incumbent John Patrick Hopkins had initially voiced his intent to resign at the end of his term, amid the fallout of the Ogden gas scandal he began considering reversing this decision, in hopes that he might be able to redeem himself before the voters. However, prospects of him seeking reelection were quickly squashed.

The only two individuals ultimately interested in the nomination were Chicago Postmaster Washington Hesing and President of the Sanitary District of Chicago Frank Wenter. In his pursuit of the nomination, Wenter received support from the wing of the party that had in the past backed Carter Harrison Sr.

By the time of the convention, well nothing was certain, the race for the nomination appeared to be in Wenter's favor. At the convention, Wenter was easily chosen by acclamation, with Hesing withdrawing before the nomination process even finished.

=== Republican nomination ===
The Republican nomination went to George Bell Swift. Swift had previously served as acting mayor of Chicago in 1893, following the assassination of Carter Harrison Sr. This brief tenure had been controversial.

=== Populist nomination ===
The People's (Populist) party nominated Bayard Taylor Holmes, an advocate for improved medical education and public health. Holmes, a prominent Chicago physician, had been urged to run. The prominent liberal Chicago attorney Clarence Darrow served as the chairman of the party's nominating convention.

Many political forces that would later play a prominent role during the 1896 United States presidential election backed Holmes' candidacy. Holmes's received support from a coalition of various socialist, populist, single-taxers, progressives, and liberals. at which Holmes was nominated. Holmes's candidacy was backed by followers of the local labor leader Eugene Debs. Additionally, Henry Demarest Lloyd played a key role in his campaign.

The People's Party had become a significant third-party in American politics during the 1892 elections, but would fade away after many of the political factions it attracted were drawn to Democratic nominee William Jennings Bryan in the 1896 presidential election instead of the party's own nominee.

=== People's Free Silver nomination ===
A free silver-supporting offshoot of the People's Party, the People's People's Free Silver Party, nominated Ebenezer Wakely for mayor. Wakely had been the People's Party's own mayoral nominee in the previous election.

=== Prohibition nomination ===
The Prohibition Party nominated Arthur J. Bassett.

== General election ==
Wenter worked hard to campaign against Swift. During the campaign, speeches held by Democratic candidate Wenter attracted large and enthusiastic crowds. Substantial funds were raised for his campaign and a large campaign committee was formed to support its operations.

Wenter sought to present himself as an individual who was not a "machine politician", and was not intending to run on Hopkins' record. He argued the central concern of the election should be "competence". He contrasted his well-regarded record as head of the Sanitary District with what had been a controversial brief tenure of Swift as interim mayor.

=== Results ===
Swift won a heavy victory. This marked only the third Republican mayoral victory in Chicago since 1877 (after only the 1887 and 1891 elections), and only the second such victory since 1877 to come in an election with a Democratic nominee (there had been none in the 1887 election).

1895 Chicago mayoral election
Party	Candidate	Votes	%
Republican	George Bell Swift	143,884	55.09
Democratic	Frank Wenter	103,125	39.48
Populist	Bayard Holmes	12,882	4.93
Prohibition	Arthur J. Bassett	994	0.38
People's Free Silver	Ebenezer Wakeley	302	0.12
Turnout		261,187	

Swift received 37.11% of the Polish-American vote, while Wenter received 57.96%.

== Works cited ==
- Hogan, John F. (2018). Chicago Shakedown: The Ogden Gas scandal. Charleston, South Carolina: The History Press. ISBN 9781467139519.
