= Bayard Holmes =

American surgeon and politician (1852–1924)

portrait photograph of Holmes

Bayard Taylor Holmes (July 29, 1852–1924) was an American physician, educator, and politician based in Chicago, Illinois.

Holmes became a medical profession in Chicago during the 1880s. He served as a surgeon at the Cook County Hospital and a senior professor of surgery at the Chicago's College of Physicians and Surgeons (which later became the University of Illinois College of Medicine). Holmes was an early proponent and researcher in the field of the bacteriology. He was influential in shaping the direction of the College of Physicians and Surgeons. Throughout his career, more traditional figures in the medical field considered Holmes to be a radical.

Holmes was also involved in politics, having socialist views and running as the People's Party nominee for mayor of Chicago in 1895.

Holmes changed his career direction after his son became afflicted with "dementia praecox", a condition today known as schizophrenia. Holmes at first retired in 1908 to care for his son full time, but soon dedicated himself to research in search of a cure. He ultimately formulated an incorrect theory that the condition was the result of toxins (likely histamine) released by overgrown of bacteria within intestinal blockages. Based on this misbelief, he developed a therapy for schizophrenia that involved an abdominal surgical incision into the intestines, followed by daily colonic irrigations. He first trialed this treatment on his own son in 1916. His son died only four days into the treatment. Undeterred, Holmes continued to try this treatment. He claimed positive results, and purged records of his son's treatment. He established a reputation as a top authority on "Dementia praecox". Several recent retrospectives have taken a highly negative view towards his work related to that condition.

== Early life, education, and career ==
Holmes was born in North Hero, Vermont in 1852. Holmes' father was an inventor of binding attachments for harvesting machines. Holmes' early life was spent on farms in rural Vermont, and as a pioneer in Minnesota. He would not enter the field of medicine until later in his life. In 1871, Holmes moved to Chicago, in the state of Illinois. He was nineteen years old when he arrived in Chicago.

Holmes received a liberal education at Old University of Chicago. In 1874, he graduated from the Paw Paw Institute, located near Aurora, Illinois, with a Bachelor of Science. He worked as a teacher for eleven years before deciding to study medicine.

== Medical career ==
In mid-1883, he began attending Rush Medical College. Towards the end of that year, he enrolled at the Homeopathic Medical College in Chicago, graduating in 1884 with a Medical Doctorate.

Holmes served as a surgeon at the Cook County Hospital, a senior professor of surgery at the Chicago's College of Physicians and Surgeons (which later became the University of Illinois College of Medicine). Throughout his career, more traditional figures in the medical field considered Holmes to be a radical.

Holmes was a member of the American Medical Association, American Academy of Medicine, and other organizations.

=== Early work as a surgeon and bacteriologist ===
After receiving his medical degree, Holmes interned and studied at the Cook County Hospital, and was later made a surgeon on the hospital's staff. It was uncommon for a homeopathic medicine graduate to be awarded an internship at the hospital. His high maturity and devotion to his medical studies has been credited with securing him the internship. During this internship, he ambitiously sought to conduct research in the developing field of bacteriology. The hospital had limited resources for research at the time, with very little medical literature being available in the city of Chicago on the field, and a highly limited lab materials for him to work with. He had to import agar agar for his research after finding no available supply in all of the United States. Holmes' efforts faced other obstacles, including ridicule from others in the hospital.

Early in his medical career, Holmes also studied at the College of Physicians and Surgeons. He remained associated both Cook County Hospital and the College of Physicians and Surgeons in his careers as a physician and educator.

During his early work in bacteriology, Holmes partnered with Christian Fenger (a surgeon and pathologist) to study the likelihood of atmospheric infections being contracted from falling germs contracted during medical operations. This work proved important. He soon was asked to teach the first course ever given on bacteriology at a medical school in Chicago

=== Medical Library Association ===
In 1889, Holmes founded the Medical Library Association, a group which aimed to build a more adequate medical library in the city of Chicago. The group initially planned to raise funds from the financial donations of physicians. Later that year, the group was able to secure an agreement with the Newberry Library in which that exiting institution would create a medical department, and the group would donate the small collection of books it had already amassed.

=== Professorial career at College of Physicians and Surgeons ===
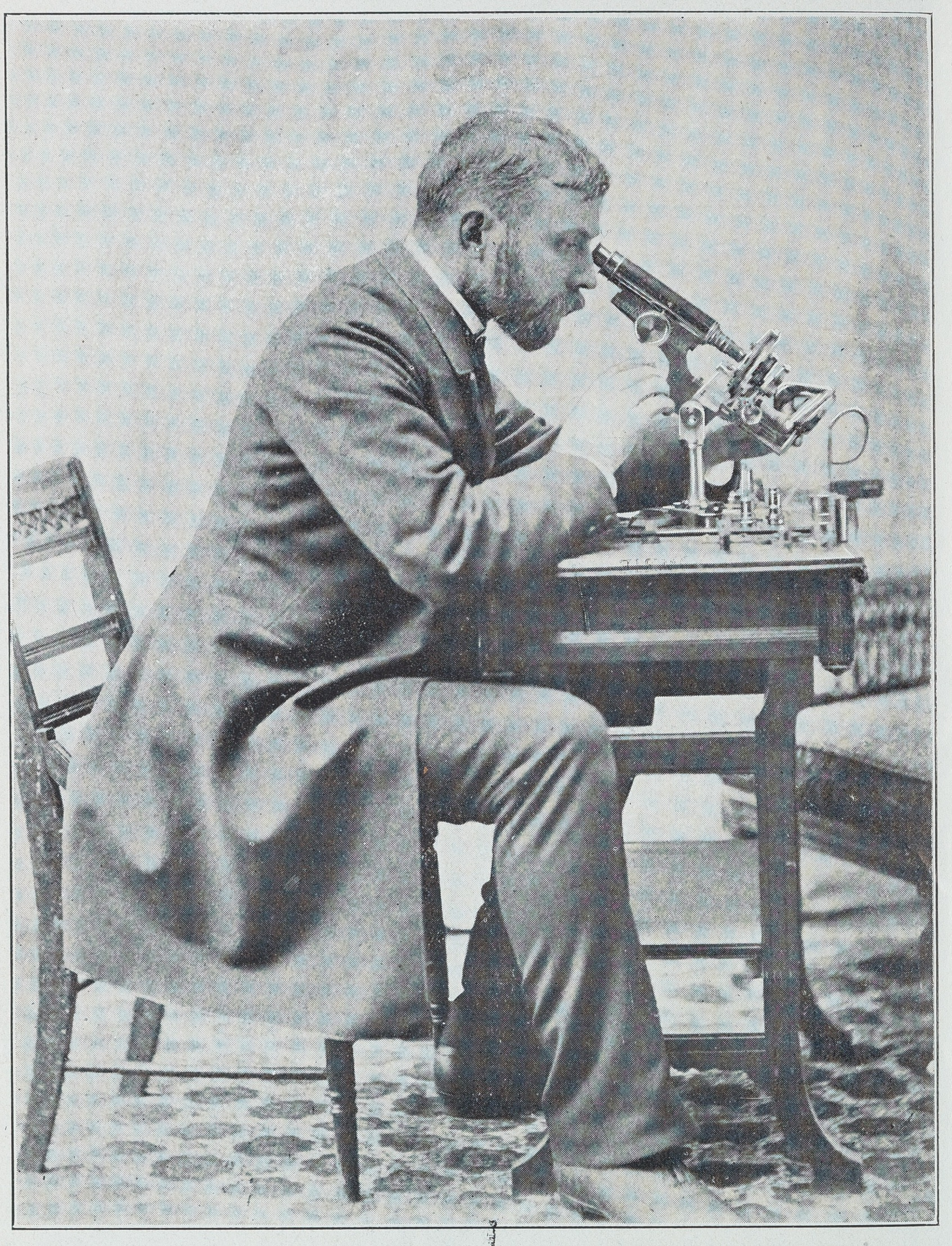
photograph of Holmes in 1889

Holmes developed a lifelong interest in pedagogy, and in 1889 accepted a teaching job at the College of Physicians and Surgeons. He also held later a role as secretary of the college, in which capacity he played a large role in the institution's reorganization. He also was later made senior professor of surgery.

Holmes sought to influence the institution to de-emphasize didactic courses traditionally stressed in medical schools, and to instead emphasize practical laboratory courses. His efforts played a key role in the school adding a laboratory building in 1893. He also recruited young experimental scientists to teach at the school, including persuading Albert P. Ohlmacher to teach embryology and biology; Weller Van Hook to teach surgical pathology; and Ludvig Hektoen to teach pathology.

Holmes was a prominent advocate of improvements to medical education, and regularly lectured at Hull House. In 1909, he called for medical education to be reformed to eliminate rote, trade school, and mechanical aspects of its studies and instead adopt a more literature and research focused approach.

=== Criticisms of the AMA ===
Like many physicians during the Progressive Era, Holmes criticized the amount of power that the American Medical Association concentrated in the hands of its trustees. He criticized this as leaving rank-and-file members of the association powerless to oppose the organization's policies. He agreed with others that called for it to be reformed and made more responsive to the will of its rank-and-file.

=== Search for a cure to schizophrenia ===
In 1908, Holmes retired in order to become a caretaker to his son Ralph, who suffered "dementia praecox", as the condition today known as schizophrenia was referred to at the time. Ralph had begun developing the condition in 1905. During his retirement, Holmes worked on research and writings about the condition his son suffered. Despite having had no prior training in psychiatry, Holmes conducted literary and laboratory research on the condition. He secured a floor of the Psychopathic Hospital of Chicago to conduct investigations into the condition. He also created and served as editor of Dementia Praecox Studies, which is believed to be the first medical journal named for a psychiatric disorder. The journal was published quarterly. A number of essays and research articles created by Holmes were compiled and into two separate volumes, one published in 1911 and another 1915.

At the time, one theory about the condition was the focal infection theory of its etiology, which theorized that the condition was brought about by intestinal stasis causing a bacterial production of toxins that affected brain function of those afflicted. By 1915, Holmes believed that he had found evidence to support this theory, believing that the cause of schizophrenia was an ergot-like toxaemia caused by faecal stasis in the caecum. He theorized in 1916 that the source was likely an intestinal blockage created by an overgrowth of bacteria, and that the bacteria generated a toxin –he thought likely histamine. Acting on this theory, Holmes's work sought to develop a surgical cure. Noll developed a rational therapy based upon this theory in which the afflicted would be given abdominal surgery in which an incision into the intestines was created by cutting through the appendix, and then daily colonic irrigations were administered. In May 1916, he began experimenting, with his son being his first subject. However, his son died only four days into receiving the treatment.

Undeterred by his son's death, Holmes continued to treat 22 more patients with his therapy. In 1917, he established the short-lived Psychiatric Research Laboratory of the Psychopathic Hospital, which was located at Cook County Hospital. In his day, he was able to establish public regard as being one of the world's foremost authorities on "dementia praecox" (schizophrenia). He claim to have had several "good successes", and only two fatalities in treating the condition. In reality, his efforts were failures and harmed many patients. He did not count his son among those fatalities, and in fact expunged his son's treatment from his medical reports. He also dismissed a major research colleague, H. M. Jones, whose findings had directly contradicted his own.

Today, the University of Chicago Library holds collections related to Holmes' studies on schizophrenia.

== Politics ==
portrait photograph of Holmes

=== Political philosophy ===
By the 1890s, Holmes began to develop a personal social and economic philosophy inspired by Christianity-centered altruism, as well as the works of Karl Marx and Henry George.

Holmes theorized that while humanity had not yet found the limits to its productiveness, individuals were suffering depressions and gerneral misery due to overprotectiveness.

Holmes posited that there was a societal riddle to solve,

There is too much wheat, too much bread, therefore, the economists say women and children must starve. There is too much wool, too much coal, and too much oil, therefore they must freeze.

He posited that he solution would lay in a marxist-style public ownership scheme for the means of production and distribution to distribute to the masses the products of their own labor.

A key chapter shaping Holmes' political perspective came with his observations of the indifference of sweatshop-district manufacturers to the spread of an epidemic of smallpox, with the owners and employees resisting the efforts by the Chicago Health Department officers to destroy infected garments.

In an 1894 lecture in Nebraska, Holmes posited that criminality and insanity were each abnormalities just the same as genius, and that laws sought to enforce normality and mediocrity despite standards of normality differing by region. A report published in the Nebraska State Journal opined of this lecture,

Dr. Holmes's socialism is not fiery or impassioned socialism, it is rather the earnest, thoughtful socialism, in the spirit like that of [Victor] Hugo and [John] Ruskin. He is one of those socialists who would rather plant than uproot, rather build than destroy.

A report in the Lincoln Evening News about the same lecture opined ,

To attempt to outline Dr. Holmes' lecture would be a difficult undertaking. He is so full of facts, which he fires in round after round. Indeed, his socialism is a socialism of practicalities, not of theories. It does not abound in epigrams on the brotherhood of man, nor in flowers of rhetoric like the socialism of [Heinrich] Heine and [Ferdinand Lassalle]. It is all plain facts and practical knowledge.

=== 1895 mayoral campaign ===
sketch of Holmes, circa 1896

In 1895, Holmes was the Populist (People's Party) nominee for mayor of Chicago. He had been encouraged by others to run.

Many political forces that would play a prominent role during the 1896 United States presidential election were present in Holmes' campaign. Holmes's support came from a coalition of various socialists, populists, single-taxers, progressives, and liberals. Liberal attorney Clarence Darrow served as the chairman of the city's People's Party convention, at which Holmes was nominated. Holmes's candidacy was backed by followers of the local labor leader Eugene Debs. Henry Demarest Lloyd played a key role in his campaign.

A competing ticket nominated by a free silver-supporting offshoot of the People's Party, the People's Free Silver Party, nominated Ebenezer Wakely for mayor. Wakely had been the People's Party nominee in the previous mayoral election.

Holmes' campaign was sharply defeated, and he never again ran for public office. He placed a distant third, with 12,882 votes (4.93%), compared to Republican nominee George Bell Swift's 143,884 (55.09%) and Democratic nominee Frank Wenter's 103,125 (39.48%).

=== Retirement and later activities ===
Holmes retired from active practice in approximately 1919, five years prior to his death. Holmes' health began suffering around the time that he retired.

In his later years, Holmes was an advisor to the Board of Natural Resources and Conversation of the Illinois Department of Education and Registration.

In August 1923, Holmes wrote a letter to the editor of the Fairhope Courier urging against the proposition of removing the Marietta Johnson School of Organic Education from the town of Fairhope, Alabama (where he and his wife owned a winter vacation home).

== Death and legacy ==
In December 1923, the Fairhope Courier reported that Holmes had taken quite ill since returning to Fairhope from Chicago, and that friends had seen very little of him since. After several months of declining health, Holmes died on April 11, 1924 at the winter vacation home he and his wife owned in Fairhope, Alabama. Holmes was buried at the Fairhope Cemetery the following day, in accordance with a request he had made during his final illness. Prior to his burial, a very small service had been held at his Fairhope residence, during which his wife and several friends read tributes they had written about him, and the hymn "Only Remembered by What We Have Done" was performed. The service also included a reading of a work that had been written many years earlier by Holmes, which described as being sort of "creed". At Holmes' burial, several verses of the hymn "The Day is Sinking in the West" was performed by his grave.

At the time he died, he remained viewed as a radical by many traditionalists in a medical field. Soon after his death, Victor Robinson dedicated an entire issue of his journal, Medical Life, to Holmes and expressed hope that a biographical book about Holmes might soon be authored and published. However, no such book ever came. While well-known in his time, Holmes has faded into relative obscurity in subsequent decades. In a 1952 profile of Holmes published in the Journal of the Illinois State Historical Society, Thomas N. Bonner described Holmes as "a forgotten figure". In a 1981 profile published in the journal Proceedings of the Institute of Medicine of Chicago, William Kaye Beatty described him as "a forgotten man".

Bonner's 1952 retrospective of Holmes painted a positive view of Holmes, writing

Scholarly, gentle, humane, and charitable, this remarkable physician's life combined the virtue of Christian service with a self-sacrificing idealism.

During the 21st century, Holmes' work in relation to schizophrenia has been given very negative retrospective assessments by several profiles. He has been compared to Henry Cotton, a doctor who years after Holmes would seek to remove organs he believed might be a source of bacterial infections causing schizophrenia (trying teeth, tonsils, gallbladders, cervices, colons, thyroids, and other body parts). Like Holmes, Cotton also had a son afflicted by the condition upon whom he experimented. Both Holmes's and Cotton's efforts proved unsuccessful, and had tragic results for many subjects. Additionally, Holmes's and Cotton's actions of treating their own sons experimentally was a breach of the standards for medical ethics already in place at time.

== Selected works by Holmes ==
- Empyema. A Lecture delivered at the Post-Graduate Medical School, Chicago, January 24, 1891. JAMA. 1891;XVI(14):476–482. doi:10.1001/jama.1891.02410660008002
- The Surgery of the Head (1903)
- The Surgery of the Abdomen (1904)
- The friends of the insane, The soul of medical education, and other essays, 1911
- The insanity of youth, and other essays, 1915
- The Relation of Cecal Stasis to Dementia Precox. William Wood, 1916
- Medical history of Chicago: the condition of medical thought, medical practice and hospital service after the Great Fire and before the World's Fair, 1871-1893. Medical Life 34 (6), 1927

== Electoral history ==
1895 Chicago mayoral election
Party	Candidate	Votes	%
Republican	George Bell Swift	143,884	55.09
Democratic	Frank Wenter	103,125	39.48
Populist	Bayard Holmes	12,882	4.93
Prohibition	Arthur J. Bassett	994	0.38
People's Free Silver	Ebenezer Wakeley	302	0.12
Total votes		261,187	100

Party political offices
Preceded by Ebenezer Wakeley	Populist nominee for Mayor of Chicago; 1895	Succeeded by n/a
