= Samuel Hoard (politician) =

American politician

Postmaster of Chicago
- In office 1865–1866
- Appointed by: Abraham Lincoln
- Preceded by: John Locke Scripps
- Succeeded by: Robert A. Gilmore

Member of the Illinois Senate from the Cook County district
- In office 1842 – 1844

Personal details
- Born: May 20, 1800 Westminster, Massachusetts
- Died: November 25, 1881 (aged 81) Chicago, Illinois
- Resting place: Oak Woods Cemetery
- Profession: Farmer, publisher

Samuel H. Hoard (May 20, 1800 – November 25, 1881) was an American publisher, merchant, judge and politician from Massachusetts. Originally a student of law, Hoard became partner at a mercantile firm until his election as a magistrate in New York. In 1828, he began to focus on publishing, managing two New York papers. Hoard moved to Illinois to manage a farm and quickly became an important local political figure. He served a term in the Illinois Senate and was later appointed postmaster of Chicago. Hoard co-founded the original University of Chicago and served on its board of trustees.

== Biography ==
Samuel Hoard was born in Westminster, Massachusetts on May 20, 1800. He was orphaned at the age of six and grew up with relatives. Hoard attended public schools and attended an academy. Hoard studied law, but decided instead to pursue mercantile interests. He rose at a trading house from clerk to a partner. When the trading house failed, Hoard entered politics. He was elected as a magistrate, then later as Judge of the County Court of Franklin County, New York. In 1828, Hoard co-founded the Franklin Republican with James Long. Seven years later, he assumed control of Preston King's St. Lawrence Republican following King's election to the New York State Assembly.

In the late 1830s, Hoard headed west to Cook County, Illinois to manage a farm. Hoard oversaw a committee to select members of the Illinois General Assembly in 1838. In 1840, he was appointed to take a county census. In 1842, Hoard was elected to the Illinois Senate, serving one two-year term. When his term expired, Hoard was appointed clerk of the Circuit Court of Cook County, moving to Chicago, Illinois. Originally managing real estate, Hoard formed a partnership with J. T. Edwards to form a jewelry house.

The partnership continued until the outbreak of the Civil War, when Hoard left to become the secretary of the Union Defense Committee. Hoard was then appointed postmaster of Chicago, filling the position until the end of the war. Hoard then served on the Chicago Board of Health. He was named secretary of the Chicago Orphan Asylum when it was founded.

=== Personal life ===
Hoard married Sophronia Conant, the sister of Thomas Jefferson Conant, in 1827. They had one adopted child named Genevieve who was possibly adopted from the Chicago orphanage asylum in which he was involved which was set up for orphans from the 1849 cholera epidemic. He co-founded the (Old) University of Chicago in 1857 and served on its first board of trustees. Hoard also served on the Chicago Board of Education. Hoard lost most of his holdings in the Great Chicago Fire of 1871.

He died at his home in Chicago on November 25, 1881, and was buried at Oak Woods Cemetery.
