= James Sexton (disambiguation) =

Sir James Sexton (1856–1938) was a British trade union leader and politician.

James or Jimmy Sexton may also refer to:

- James A. Sexton (1844–1899), American soldier, businessman and politician
- Jimmy Sexton (baseball) (born 1951), American baseball player
- Jimmy Sexton (sports agent) (born 1963), American sports agent
- James Sexton (attorney) (born 1972), American family law attorney
- Buck Sexton (James Buckman Sexton, born 1981), American radio and television talk show host, author and conservative political commentator
