= Frank Wenter =

German-born American politician

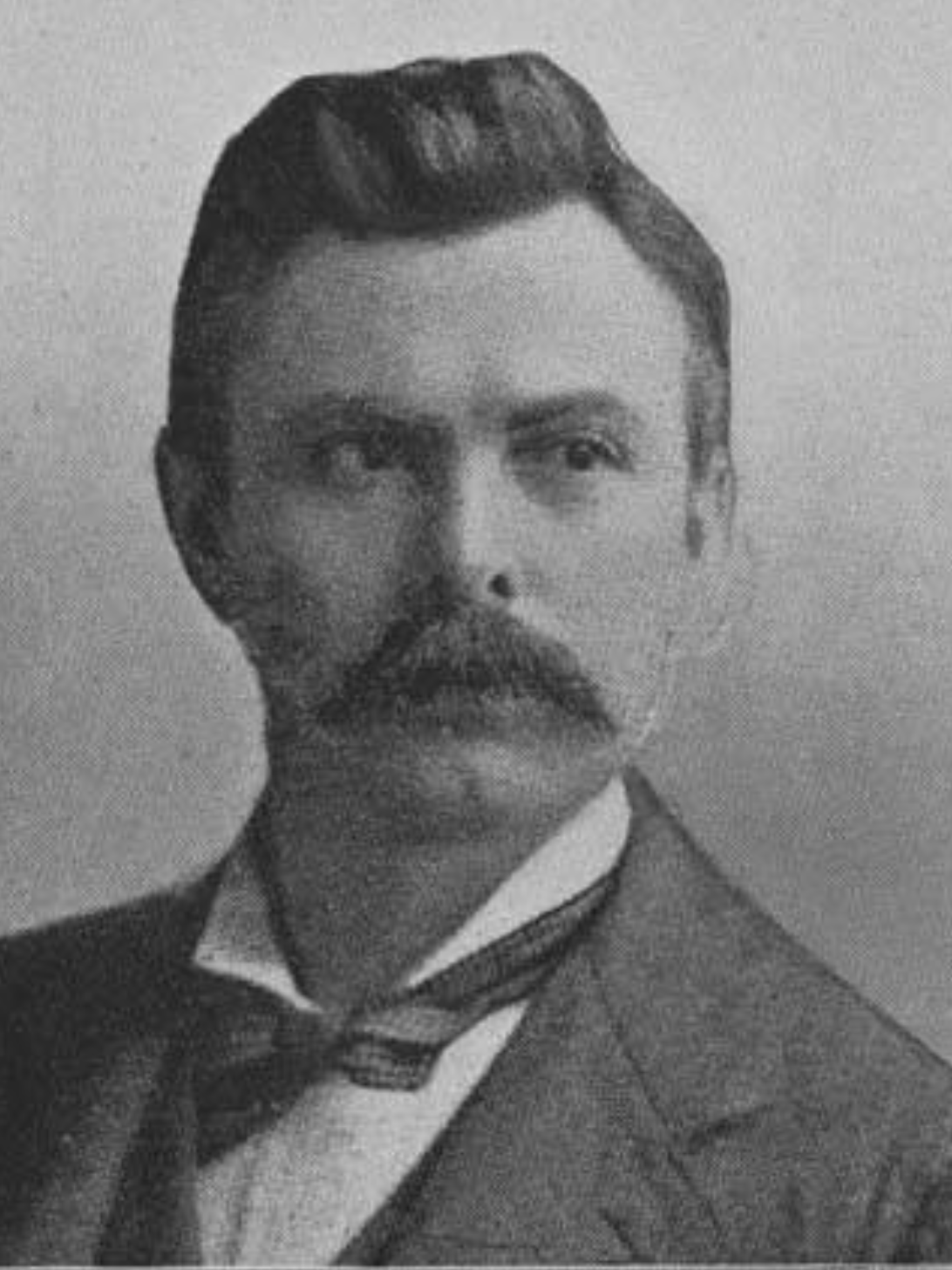
- Wenter circa 1899

Member of the Chicago Civil Service Commission
- In office June 1, 1906 – May 4, 1907
- Preceded by: Joseph W. Errant

President of the Chicago Sanitary District
- In office December 8, 1891 – December 3, 1895
- Preceded by: Richard Prendergast
- Succeeded by: Bernard A. Eckhart

Member of the Chicago Sanitary District Board of Trustees
- In office 1889–1905

Personal details
- Born: June 11, 1852 Germany
- Died: October 9, 1929 (aged 77)
- Resting place: Graceland Cemetery, Chicago
- Party: Democratic

Frank A. Wenter Sr. (June 11, 1852 – October 9, 1929) was a German-born American politician who served as president of the Chicago Sanitary District and who was the unsuccessful nominee of the Democratic Party in the 1895 Chicago mayoral election.

== Early life and education ==
Wenter was born in Central Germany on June 11, 1852. He immigrated to the United States as a child. In adulthood, he became a prominent Chicagoan.

== Chicago Sanitary District ==
Wenter served three terms on the Chicago Sanitary District's board of trustees as a Democrat. He was first elected on December 12, 1889, in the special election to select the inaugural board members. Prior to this, during the November 5, 1889 election, voters approved the ballot measure that created the district. He was reelected on November 5, 1895 and November 5, 1900. His tenure ended December 4, 1905. On December 8, 1891, the board of trustees voted for Wenter to serve as its president, a role he held until December 3, 1895.

The groundbreaking ceremony for the Chicago Sanitary and Ship Canal occurred on September 3, 1892. Wenter performed the ceremonial first shoveling. On November 1, 1893, Wenter served as an honorary pallbearer at the large public funeral procession for Carter Harrison III, the assassinated mayor of Chicago.

== Mayoral campaigns ==
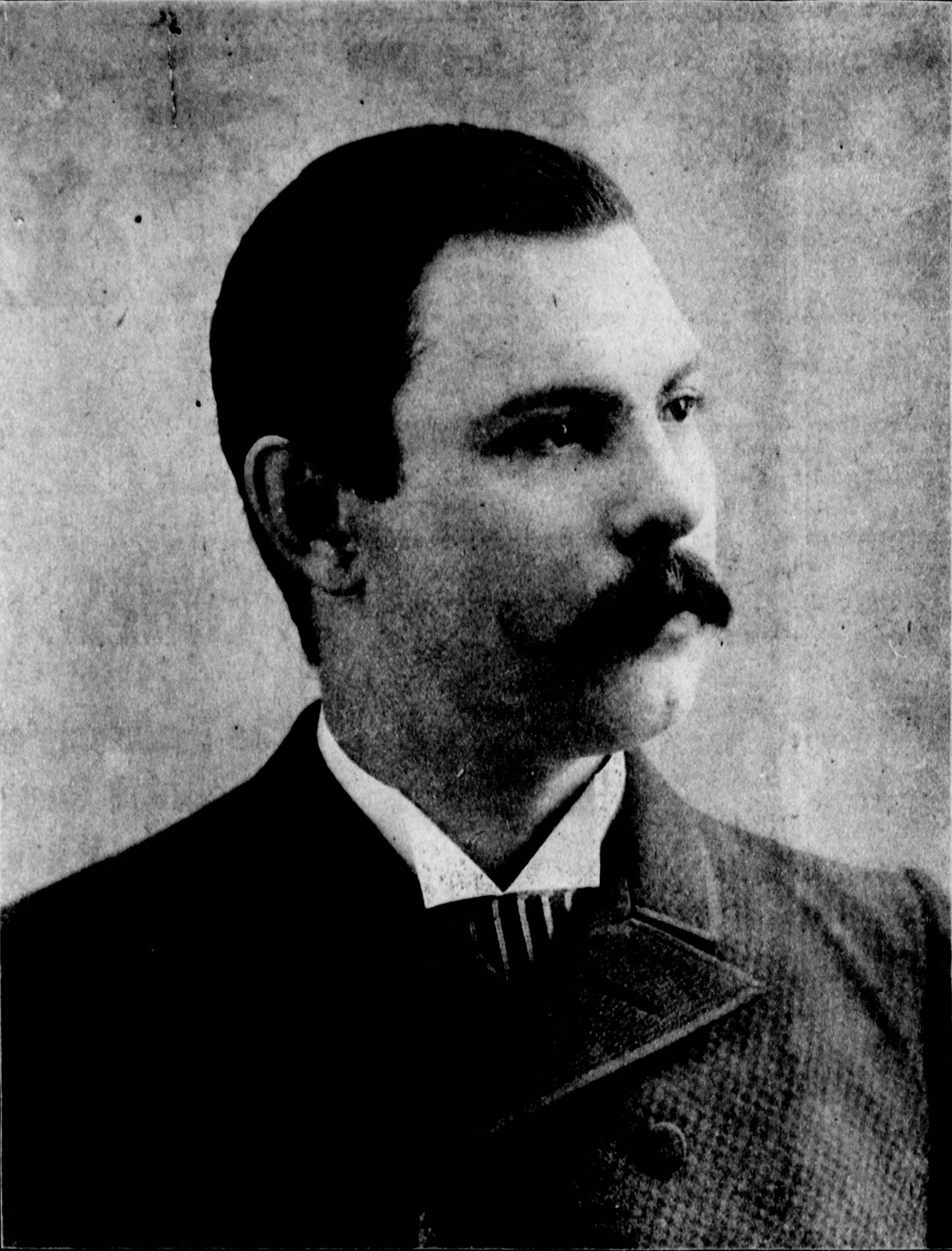
Wenter circa 1901

=== 1893 ===
Wenter unsuccessfully sought the Democratic Party nomination in the 1893 special election held after the assassination of Mayor Harrison. The death of Harrison had not only resulted in a mayoral vacancy, but had also left Chicago's Democratic Party in search of a leader. Ahead of the election, many individuals were speculated as potential candidates, including Wenter. Wenter was regarded to be a leading "Harrisonite". Wenter ultimately went all-in as a candidate and campaigned heavily. He was avidly supported by the party's Harrison camp. He was backed by the Chicago Times and Cook County Democratic Party Chairman John McGillen. In the primary election held to elect delegates for the city's nominating convention, John Patrick Hopkins had a clear victory. In a last minute move, McGillen attempted to appoint himself the chair of the convention, presumably so that he would be in a position to disqualify delegates supporting Hopkins. However, the party's executive committee overruled this by a vote of 7 to 2. At the convention Wenter, Hopkins, and John A. King had their names placed for nomination in the mayoral balloting. Wenter received few votes during balloting, and withdrew his candidacy before the end of the first round of balloting, Hopkins was then nominated by acclamation.

=== 1895 ===
Incumbent Democrat mayor John Patrick Hopkins, tarnished by the Ogden Gas Scandal, did not seek reelection in 1895. Wenter sought the Democratic nomination. His sole competition was Chicago Postmaster Washington Hesing. In his pursuit of the nomination, Wenter received support from the wing of the party that had in the past backed slain former mayor Carter Harrison III Swift withdrew from contention, and Wenter was nominated by acclamation at the city's Democratic Party convention. Wenter was better-known in 1895 than he had been in 1893.

Wenter's main general election opponent was George Bell Swift, the Republican nominee who formerly acted as mayor after the 1893 assassination of Mayor Carter Harrison III. Also running was the People's (Populist Party) nominee Bayard Holmes.

Wenter was seen as a strong Democratic candidate in what was expected to be a terrible election cycle for Democrats. Amid the Panic of 1893, the Democratic Party experienced a national decline in support and Republicans experienced a national rise in support. In Chicago, local decline in Democratic support was also attributable to both local matters and the overall national decline in support of Democrats. Local matters that contributed to this decline in support included fallout of the Ogden Gas Scandal and an especially strong disapproval in Chicago of Democratic President Grover Cleveland's intervention in the Pullman Strike and the economic fallout of the Panic of 1893.

Wenter sought to present himself as an individual who was not a "machine politician". He also sought to make it clear was not intending to run on Hopkins' record. He argued the central concern of the election should be "competence". He contrasted his well-regarded record as head of the Sanitary District with what had been a controversial brief tenure of Swift as interim mayor. Wenter lost the election, receiving 39.68% to Swift's 55.36%. Holmes received 4.96%.

== Chicago Civil Service Commission ==
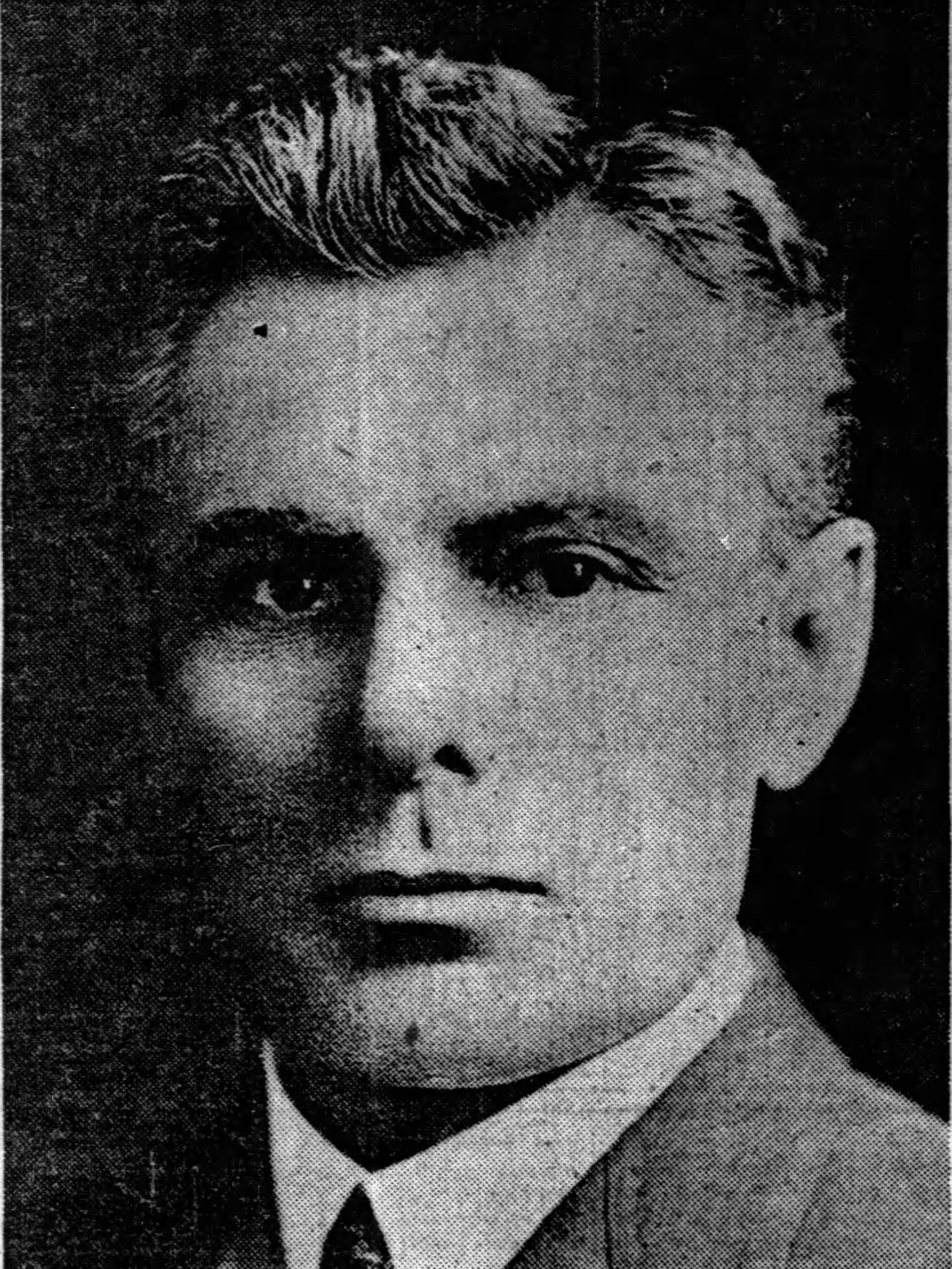
Wenter circa 1906

At the start of July 1906 Wenter was the manager of Edward Fitzsimmons Dunne's successful 1905 Chicago mayoral campaign. In 1906, Dunne appointed Wenter to serve on the Chicago Civil Service Commission. While past appointments to the commission had been done with the advice and consent of the Chicago City Council, the Chicago corporation counsel had advised Mayor Dunne that this was not required, and so Wenter was appointed unilaterally by the mayor. Wenter was appointed to the seat that had been held by previous commission president Joseph W. Errant, whose term had just expired.

On May 4, 1907, new mayor Fred A. Busse dismissed all of the Civil Service Commission's members from their posts. Wenter and other commission members attempted to refuse to comply with their removal.

== Personal life ==
Wenter and his wife, Anna, had three children.

In 1908, James F. Stepina was granted a divorce from his wife after he alleged in his divorce filing that his wife had carried out an extramarital affair with Wenter. Days later, Wenter's wife Anna filed for divorce. Wenter did not contest the divorce suit, which alleged that Wenter had had an extramarital affair with Manitou, Colorado resident Dell Myers. Anna Wenter was friendly with Mrs. Stepina and opted not to name her in the divorce filing, though it was understood that the revelations in the Stepinas' divorce were the impetus for the Wenters' divorce.

== Death ==
Wenter died of heart disease at the age of 75 on October 9, 1929. His funeral was held two days later, and he was interred at Chicago's Graceland Cemetery.
