= Walhart =

Walhart may refer to:

- Walhart, a character in the video game Fire Emblem Awakening; the current founder of Empire of Valm and the Conqueror and the major enemy boss
- Charles Walhart Woodman, the U.S. representative from Illinois from the 1800s
