= John Scripps =

John Scripps may refer to:

- John Martin Scripps (1959–1996), English serial killer
- John Locke Scripps (1818–1866), attorney, journalist and author
