= Ogden Gas scandal =

American political scandal

The Ogden Gas scandal was a political scandal in Chicago in February and March 1895 that concerned the formation of the Ogden Gas Company for the purposes of forcing an existing gas franchise holder to purchase it and thereby enrich members of the city government. Of the ten aldermen who had voted for the ordinance forming the company and ran for re-election in April, only two received another term; another six pro-ordinance aldermen declined to run. Democratic Mayor John Patrick Hopkins declined to run for reelection and supported Democratic candidate Frank Wenter, who was heavily defeated by Republican George Bell Swift. Upon taking office Swift signed ordinances repealing the franchises of the company and shortly thereafter revoked the company's permits to do business.

== Background ==
John Patrick Hopkins was born in Buffalo, New York, and dropped out of school at the age of 13. He met and befriended Roger Sullivan, and the two constructed a political machine.

== Passage of ordinances ==
On February 25, 1895, the Chicago City Council met and discussed many trivial items on the agenda; the companies later subject to scandal did not appear. Hopkins left early in the meeting and gave the gavel to alderman Mike Ryan, who recognized fellow alderman John McGillen. McGillen introduced an ordinance to grant a franchise to the Norwood Construction Company for the construction of an electric plant, before substituting for it an ordinance granting the Cosmopolitan Electric Company a 50-year franchise. The Cosmopolitan Electric Company's franchise passed despite the concerns of several aldermen unaffiliated with the scheme and the fact that the company itself was unknown to the council.

Ryan gave the gavel to McGillen, who recognized alderman John Powers. Powers introduced a motion to reconsider a failed 1892 franchise to the City and County Gas Company. After an attempt to delay this was shelved, Powers substituted for it a franchise to the Ogden Gas Company, which also passed despite objections.

== Aftermath ==
The ordinance was called "the most disgraceful act" in the history of the City Council by a local paper. Attempting to determine the identities of those who operated the mysterious companies became fashionable throughout Chicago.

Hopkins's career was ruined in the aftermath of the scandal. He was castigated by opponents as the most corrupt mayor in Chicago's history to that date. He died of Spanish flu in 1918.

== Works cited ==
- Hogan, John F. (2018). Chicago Shakedown: The Ogden Gas scandal. Charleston, South Carolina: The History Press. ISBN 9781467139519.
