= Washington Hesing =

American newspaper editor and politician (b. 1849, d. 1897)

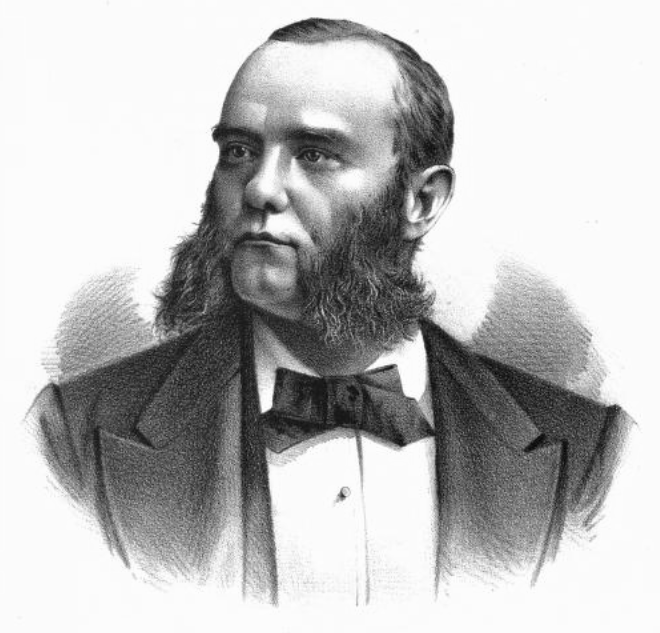
- Hesing, circa 1881

Postmaster of Chicago
- In office 1893–1897
- Appointed by: Grover Cleveland
- Preceded by: James A. Sexton
- Succeeded by: Charles U. Gordon

Personal details
- Born: May 4, 1849 Cincinnati, Ohio
- Died: December 17, 1897 (aged 48) Chicago, Illinois
- Resting place: Saint Boniface Cemetery, Chicago
- Party: Republican (1871-1880); Democratic (1880-1897)
- Spouse: Henrietta C. Weir
- Parent: Anton C. Hesing (father)
- Education: Yale University
- Profession: Newspaper publisher
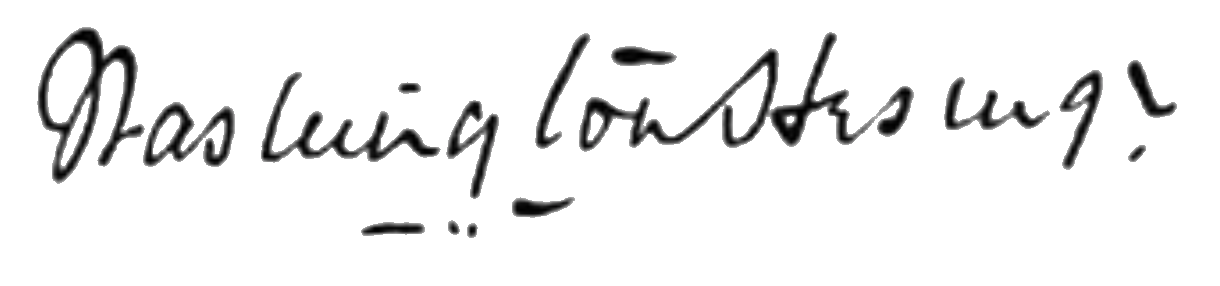
- Signature

Washington Hesing (1849–1897) was an American newspaper editor and political figure primarily known for his ownership of the Illinois Staats-Zeitung and his term as postmaster of Chicago during the second term of President Grover Cleveland.

== Biography ==
Hesing was the son of newspaper publisher and former Sheriff of Cook County, Anton C. Hesing. He graduated from Yale University and later studied at the University of Berlin in his father's native Germany.

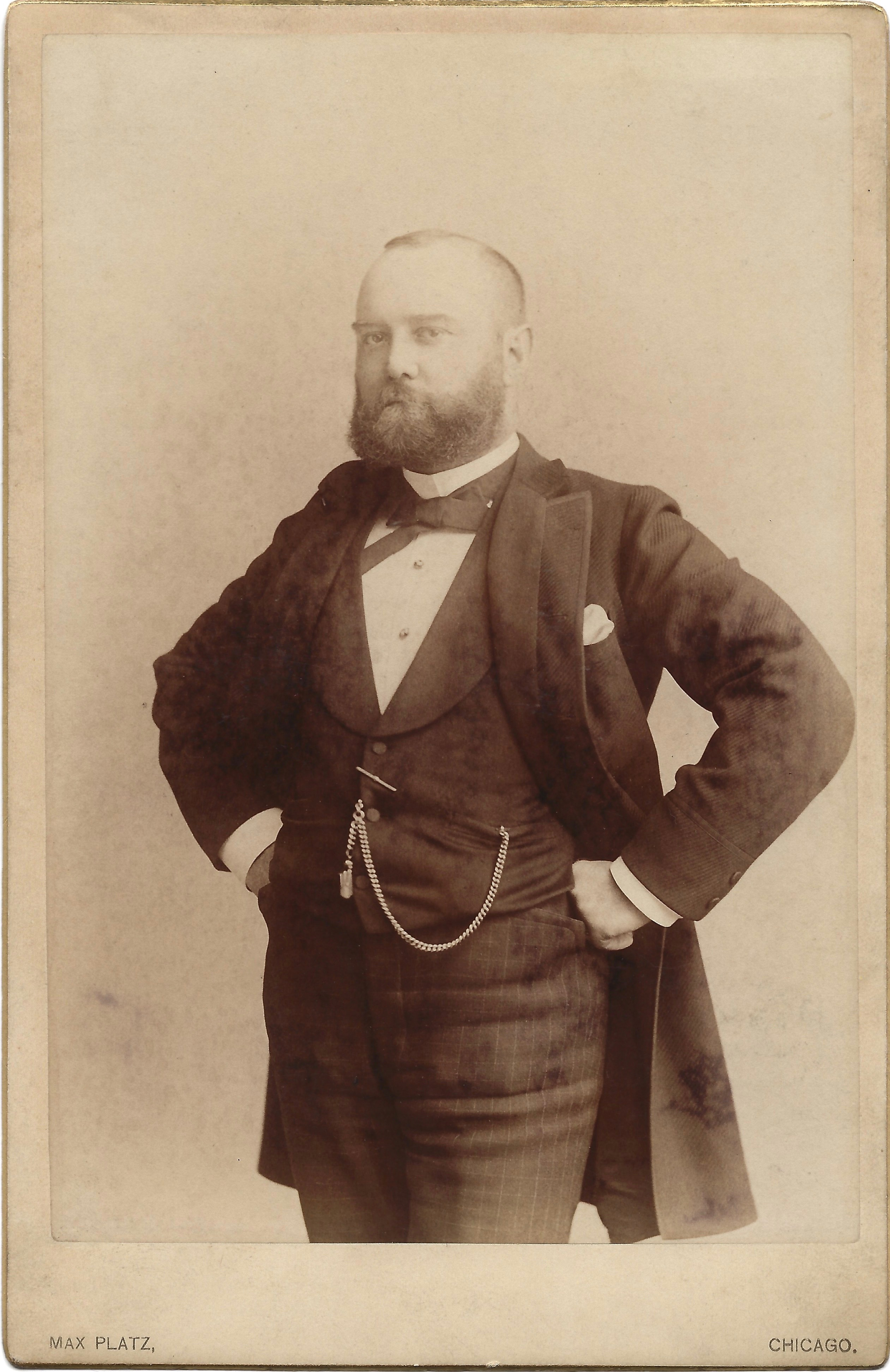
Hesing, c. 1880

At the age of 22, he was appointed to the Chicago Board of Education. After his term on the board, he declined an offer from Mayor Joseph Medill to be nomination for a second term. While initially an active Republican, like his father, and a campaigner for President Grant, Hesing left the Republican Party and joined the Democratic Party in 1880. After completing his brief stint on the Chicago Board of Education, Hessing became a full time editorial manager of the Illinois Staats-Zeitung, working under both his own father as well as editor-in-chief Hermann Raster.

Hesing unsuccessfully sought the Democratic nomination for mayor in 1893 and 1895. In 1897, Hessing ran for mayor as an independent candidate.

After his unsuccessful campaign in the regularly scheduled mayoral election of 1893, Hessing was appointed postmaster of Chicago by President Grover Cleveland in 1893. His appointment had been secured by John Patrick Hopkins. Hopkins was a candidate at the time in the 1893 Chicago mayoral special election, which was held due to the death in office by assassination of Mayor Carter Harrison Sr., who had been the winner of the regularly scheduled mayoral election held earlier that year. Hopkins pointed to his ability to secure Hessing this appointment as a demonstration of his own sway with the Cleveland administration. In his successful special election campaign, Hopkins touted his connections with Cleveland as something that would benefit the city if he were elected mayor. Hessing left his position as postmaster in the Spring of 1897 to again campaign for the mayoralty.

Hessing died in December 1897 of heart disease.

== See also ==
- Anton C. Hesing
- Illinois Staats-Zeitung
- Germans in Chicago
