= Boetius Henry Sullivan =

American businessman

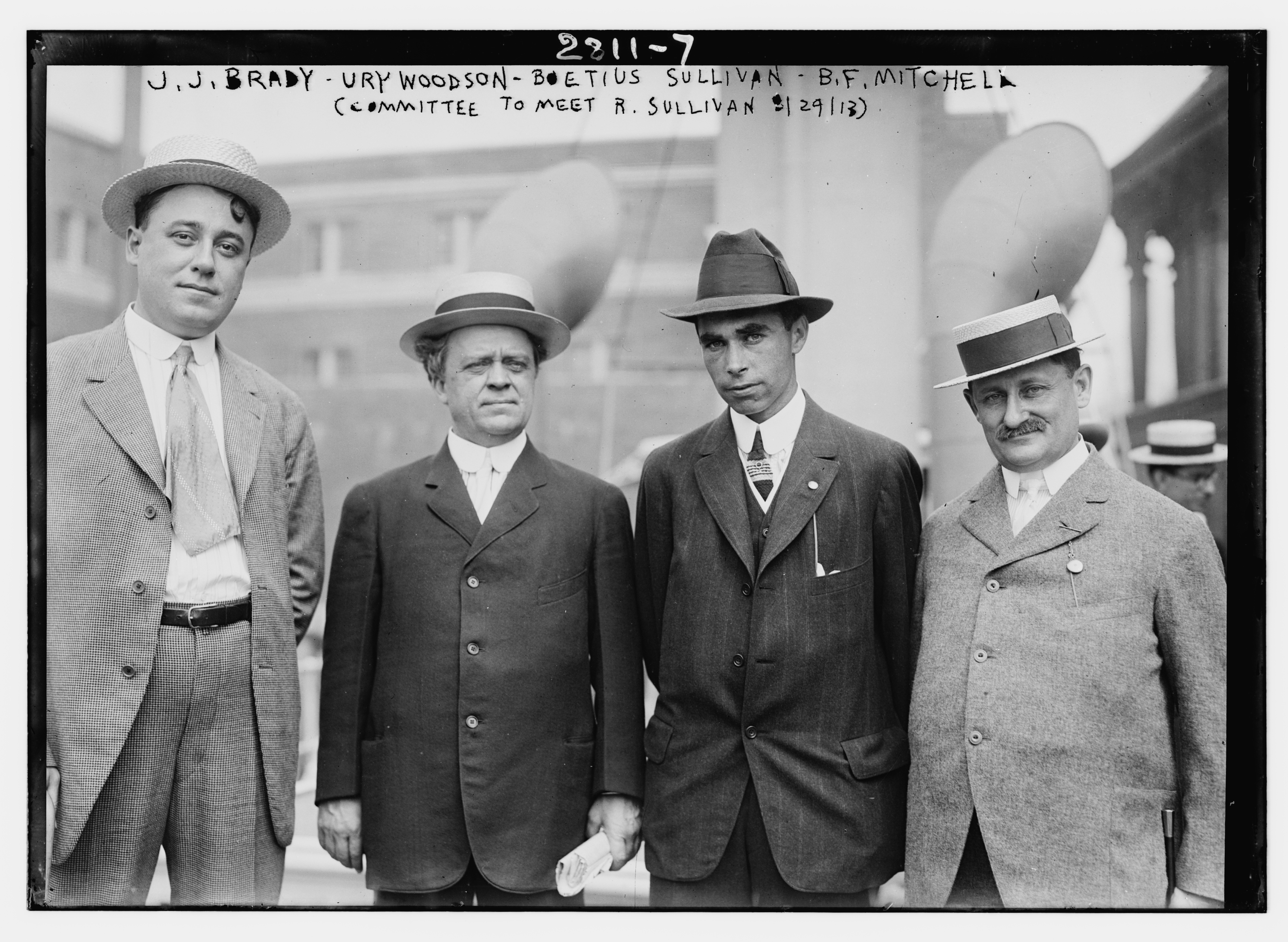
From left to right are J. J. Brady, Urey Woodson, Boetius Henry Sullivan, and B. F. Mitchell in 1913, the committee to meet Roger Charles Sullivan

Boetius Henry Sullivan Sr. (November 18, 1885 - February 14, 1961) was a Chicago businessman and lawyer who reorganized the Sawyer Biscuit Company in 1925. He was known as "The Million Dollar Kid" for his charitable contributions while attending Yale University.

== Biography ==
Boetius Henry Sullivan was born on November 18, 1885, to Roger Charles Sullivan and Helen Marie Quinlan in Chicago, Illinois. He attended Yale University and Harvard Law School, and on December 28, 1911, married Mary Loretta Connery. His father, Roger Charles Sullivan died on April 14, 1920. His son, Boetius Henry Sullivan Jr. died on December 19, 1966.

== Family ==
Boetius Sullivan married Mary Loretta Connery and had 5 children: Roger Charles Sullivan, Helen Sullivan Mckinley, Boetius Sullivan III, Mary Sullivan Griffin, and Jane Sullivan.
