= Julius Goldzier =

American politician

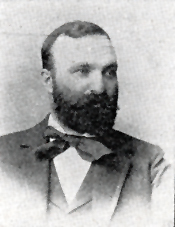

Member of the U.S. House of Representatives from Illinois's 4th district
- In office March 4, 1893 – March 3, 1895
- Preceded by: Walter C. Newberry
- Succeeded by: Charles W. Woodman

Chicago Alderman
- In office 1901–1902 Serving with John Minwegan
- Preceded by: Ernst F. Herrmann
- Succeeded by: Michael D. Dougherty
- Constituency: 21st Ward
- In office 1899–1901 Serving with Kinney Smith
- Preceded by: Fred W. Upham
- Succeeded by: John H. Sullivan
- Constituency: 22nd Ward
- In office 1888–1890 Serving with Edward Muelhoefer
- Preceded by: Thomas D. Burke
- Succeeded by: Arnold Tripp
- Constituency: 22nd Ward

Personal details
- Born: January 20, 1854 Vienna, Austria
- Died: January 20, 1925 (aged 71) Chicago, Illinois, U.S.
- Party: Democratic

Julius Goldzier (January 20, 1854 – January 20, 1925) was a U.S. representative from Illinois.

Born in Vienna, Austria Empire, Goldzier attended the public schools of Vienna and immigrated to the United States in 1866, where he settled in New York. He studied law and was admitted to the bar. He moved to Chicago in 1872 and was involved in several notable cases, including that of the anarchist John Hroneck. He was a director of the Chicago German Society as well as the director and secretary of the German-language newspaper the Abendpost. He served as member of the city council of Chicago as an alderman from the 22nd ward from 1890 to 1892.

Goldzier was elected as a Democrat to the Fifty-third Congress (March 4, 1893 – March 3, 1895). He was an unsuccessful candidate for reelection in 1894 to the Fifty-fourth Congress and was again a member of the Chicago city council in 1899. He died in Chicago, January 20, 1925 on his 71st birthday. Interment location unknown.

Goldzier was Illinois' first Jewish congressman.

== See also ==
- List of Jewish members of the United States Congress

U.S. House of Representatives
Preceded by Walter C. Newberry	Member of the U.S. House of Representatives from Illinois's 4th congressional district 1893-1895	Succeeded by Charles W. Woodman
