= Walter C. Newberry =

American politician

Walter Cass Newberry
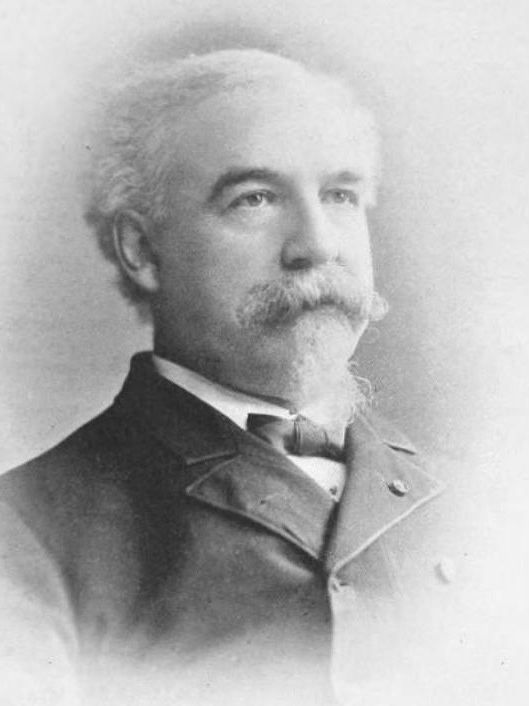
- Newberry, circa 1892

Member of the U.S. House of Representatives from Illinois's 4th district
- In office March 4, 1891 – March 3, 1893
- Preceded by: George E. Adams
- Succeeded by: Julius Goldzier

Postmaster of Chicago
- In office 1888–1889
- Appointed by: Grover Cleveland
- Preceded by: S. Corning Judd
- Succeeded by: James A. Sexton

Personal details
- Born: December 23, 1835 Waterville, New York, US
- Died: July 20, 1912 (aged 76) Chicago, Illinois, US
- Party: Democratic
- Spouse: Harriet (DeGrout)
- Children: 2
- Occupation: Soldier, Postmaster, Merchant

Walter Cass Newberry (December 23, 1835 – July 20, 1912) was a U.S. representative from Illinois.

== Biography ==
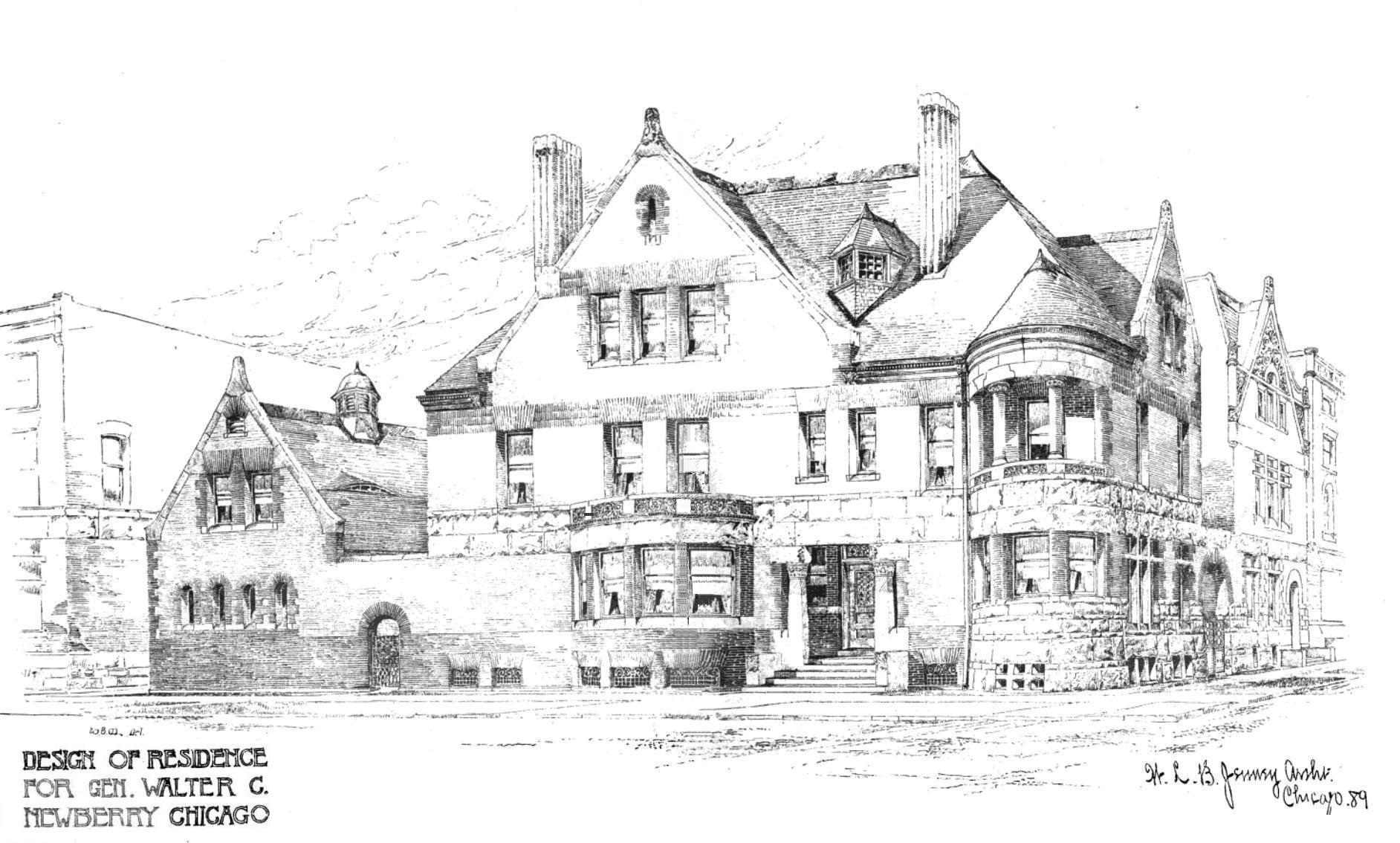
Chicago residence designed for Walter Cass Newberry by William Le Baron Jenney, 1889

Newberry was born in Waterville, New York and enlisted in the Union Army during the Civil War as a private in the Eighty-first Regiment, New York Volunteers. He was promoted to lieutenant in 1861, captain in 1862, major of the Twenty-fourth Regiment, New York Cavalry, in 1863, lieutenant colonel and colonel in 1864, and was brevetted brigadier general March 31, 1865.

He moved to Petersburg, Virginia in 1865, and served as mayor of Petersburg in 1869 and 1870, resigning in the latter year. He moved to Richmond, Virginia in 1870, and was superintendent of public property for the state for four years.

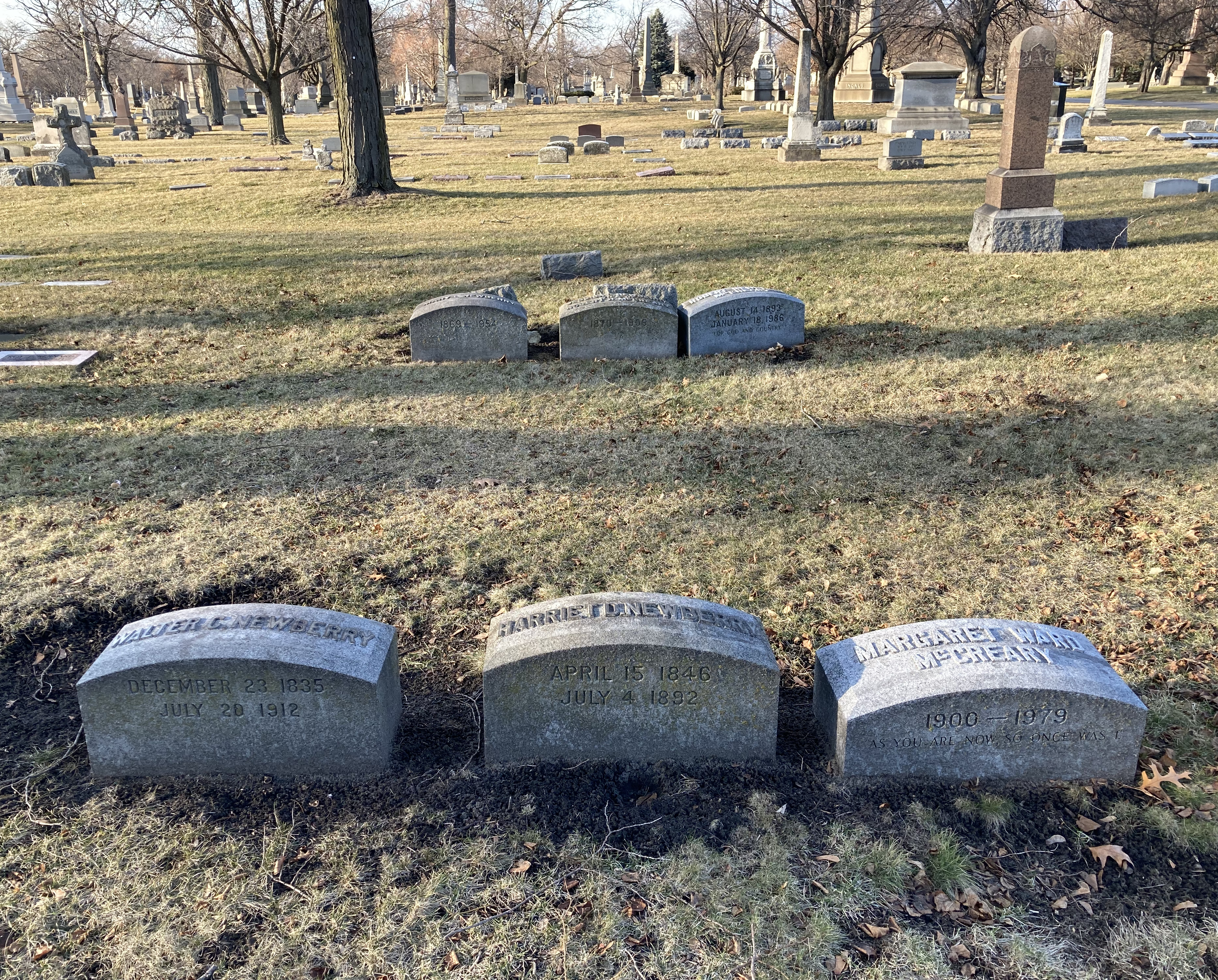
Newberry's grave at Graceland Cemetery

He moved to Chicago, Illinois, in 1876, and was postmaster of Chicago in 1888 and 1889. Newberry was elected as a Democrat to the Fifty-second Congress (March 4, 1891 – March 3, 1893). He was not a candidate for renomination in 1892.

He died in Chicago on July 20, 1912, and was interred in Graceland Cemetery.

== Source material ==
- United States Congress. "Walter C. Newberry (id: N000063)". Biographical Directory of the United States Congress.
- 10,000 Famous Freemasons from K to Z, Volume 3, Page 262, By William R. Denslow, Harry S. Truman

U.S. House of Representatives
Preceded by George E. Adams	Member of the U.S. House of Representatives from Illinois's 4th congressional district 1891-1893	Succeeded by Julius Goldzier
