= Daniel W. Mills =

American politician

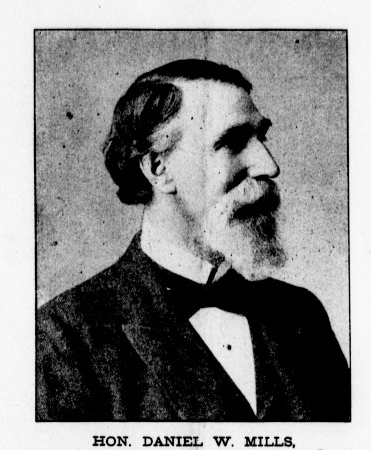

Member of the U.S. House of Representatives from Illinois's 4th district
- In office March 4, 1897 – March 3, 1899
- Preceded by: Charles W. Woodman
- Succeeded by: Thomas Cusack

Chicago Alderman from the 12th Ward
- In office 1880–1893

Personal details
- Born: February 25, 1838 Waynesville, Ohio, U.S.
- Died: December 16, 1904 (aged 66) Chicago, Illinois, U.S.
- Party: Republican

Daniel Webster Mills (February 25, 1838 – December 16, 1904) was a U.S. representative from Illinois.

Born near Waynesville, Ohio, Mills attended the common schools of Rayesville and the Waynesville High School. He moved to Corwin, Ohio, in 1859 and engaged in the mercantile, grain shipping, and pork-packing businesses. During the Civil War served in the Union Army as captain of Company D, One Hundred and Eightieth Regiment, Ohio Volunteers, until the close of the war. He moved to Chicago, Illinois. He engaged in lake shipping 1866–1869, and later in the real estate business. He served as warden of the Cook County Hospital 1877–1881. He served as an alderman on the Chicago city council from 1889 to 1893.

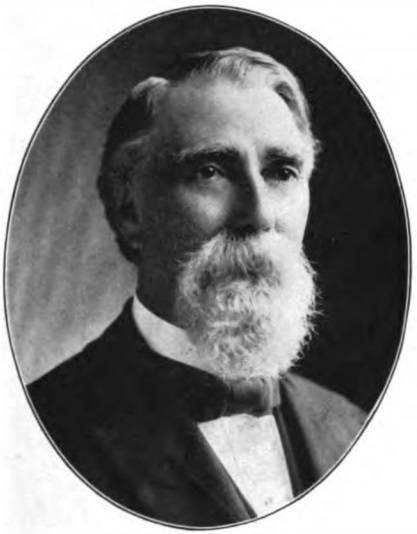
From 1912's Memorials of Deceased Companions of the Commandery of the State of Illinois, Military Order of the Loyal Legion of the United States

Mills was elected as a Republican to the Fifty-fifth Congress (March 4, 1897 – March 3, 1899). He was an unsuccessful candidate for reelection in 1898 to the Fifty-sixth Congress. He resumed the real estate business. He died in Chicago on December 16, 1904. He was interred in Graceland Cemetery.

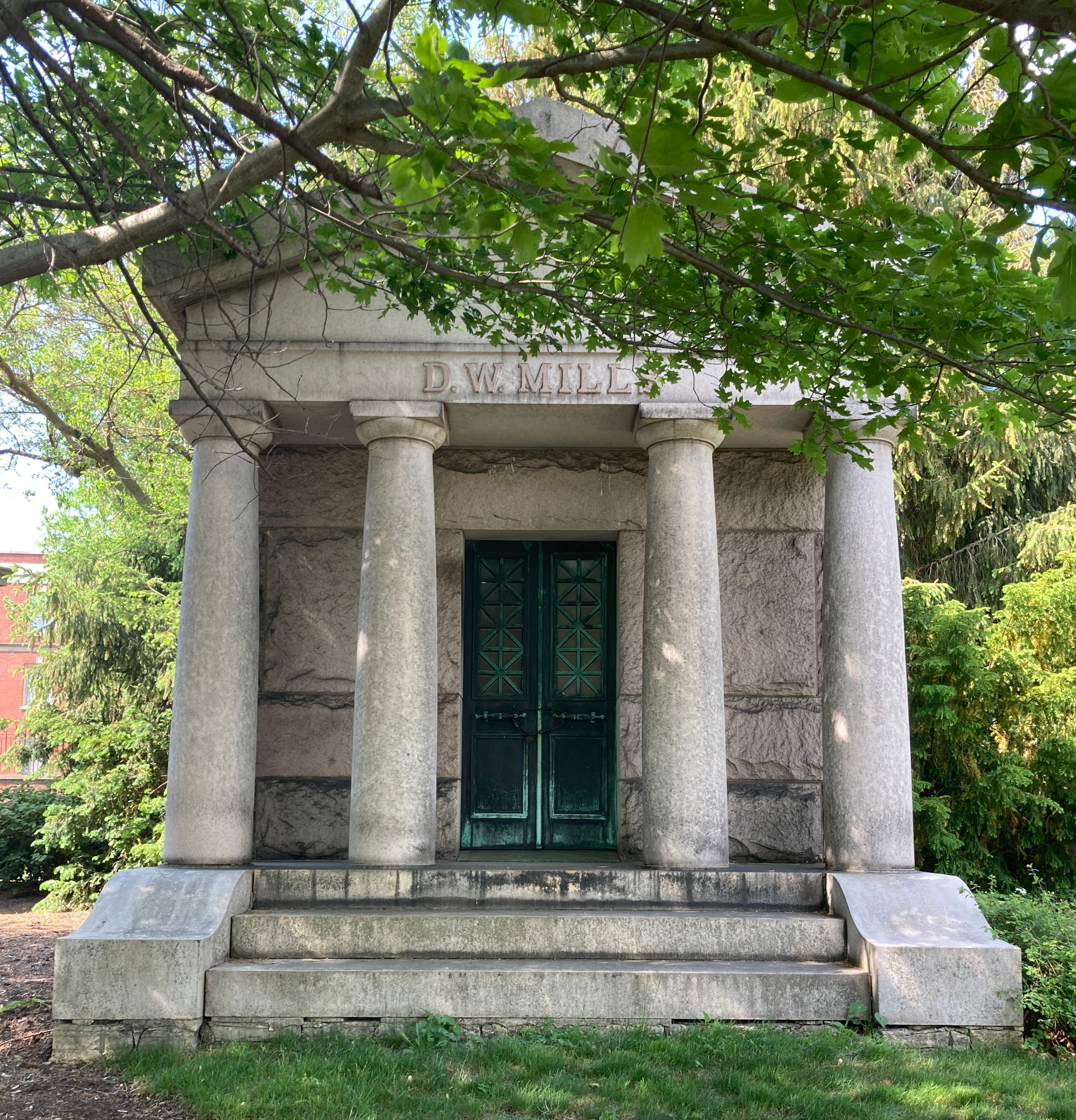
Mills' grave

U.S. House of Representatives
Preceded by Charles W. Woodman	Member of the U.S. House of Representatives from Illinois's 4th congressional district 1897-1899	Succeeded by Thomas Cusack
