= Thomas Cusack (politician) =

American politician

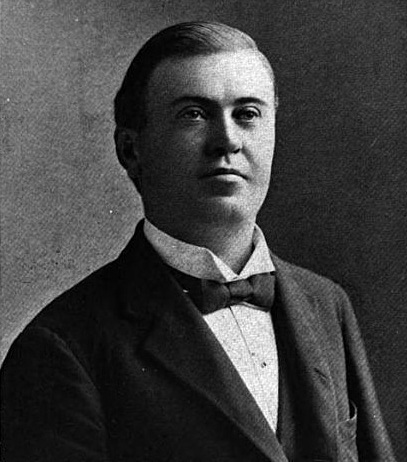
- From Illinois Political Directory, 1899, published by W. L. Bodine & Co. (Chicago, IL)

Member of the U.S. House of Representatives from Illinois's 4th district
- In office March 4, 1899 – March 3, 1901
- Preceded by: Daniel W. Mills
- Succeeded by: James McAndrews

Personal details
- Born: October 5, 1858 Kilrush, County Clare, Ireland
- Died: November 19, 1926 (aged 68) Oak Park, Illinois, U.S.
- Party: Democratic

Thomas Cusack (October 5, 1858 in Kilrush, County Clare, Ireland – November 19, 1926 in Oak Park, Illinois) was a pioneer and entrepreneur in the outdoor advertising industry and a politician, serving as a Democratic U.S. representative from Illinois' 4th district from 1899 to 1901.

Cusack emigrated with his family from Ireland to New York City in 1861 when he was a young boy. Shortly after the move, his parents died, leaving him and his younger brother orphaned. Cusack was raised by relatives in Chicago, where he received his education and learned how to paint, a skill that ultimately made him a very wealthy man. At the age of 17, Cusack established his own sign painting business, the Thomas Cusack Company, in Chicago, Illinois, making him one of the pioneers in the field of outdoor advertising. The business soon grew to be very profitable, leasing over 100,000 billboards and advertising spaces and turning Cusack into a prosperous and influential Chicagoan.

In addition to business savvy, Cusack had a strong sense of civic duty. In 1890, Mayor of Chicago Hempstead Washburne appointed the "billboard baron" to a seat on the city's school board. Cusack's fervent support of public education drew the attention of progressive Illinois Governor John P. Altgeld, who invited Cusack to serve on his general staff. In 1898, Cusack was elected to his first and only term in the United States Congress from the 4th District of Illinois. After his term, Cusack decided to return his attention primarily to his outdoor advertising business, which had grown considerably in size to more than one hundred offices with an annual revenue of over $20 million. Cusack was known for his fair labor practices and amicable relationships with his employees, and was most proud of the fact that, in a city known for labor strikes, his workers never walked off the job. In his day as a sign painter, Cusack remembered getting $8 a week in wages. By the time he sold his business to a New York banking syndicate in 1924, he was paying his workers $10 to $15 a day.

At the pinnacle of his success in business, Cusack bought the entire unincorporated town of Cascade, Colorado, at the Ute Pass in the Rocky Mountains. He hired architects and contractors to build a plush mansion nestled in the Ute Pass, which he named "Marigreen Pines" after his wife, Mary Green. Having lived through the Great Chicago Fire and experienced so many early losses in his life, Cusack built Marigreen Pines out of brick, marble and concrete to safeguard his family from harm. Marigreen Pines became a much loved mountain home for Cusack and his family, where he routinely and graciously hosted many friends and relatives, engaging them in lively conversation and debate.

Thomas Cusack died on November 19, 1926, at the age of 68. He is buried in Calvary Cemetery in Evanston, Illinois. In the 1970s, Cusack's last surviving daughter donated Marigreen Pines to the Congregation of Holy Cross to serve as their novitiate.

== Bibliography ==
- United States Congress. "Thomas Cusack (id: C001015)". Biographical Directory of the United States Congress.

U.S. House of Representatives
Preceded by Daniel W. Mills	Member of the U.S. House of Representatives from Illinois's 4th congressional district 1899-1901	Succeeded by James McAndrews
