= Charles W. Woodman =

American politician

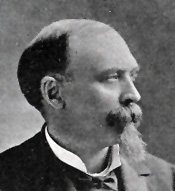

Member of the U.S. House of Representatives from Illinois's 4th district
- In office March 4, 1895 – March 3, 1897
- Preceded by: Julius Goldzier
- Succeeded by: Daniel W. Mills

Personal details
- Born: March 11, 1844 Aalborg, Denmark
- Died: March 18, 1898 (aged 54) Elgin, Illinois, U.S.
- Party: Republican

Military service
- Allegiance: United States of America; Union
- Branch/service: United States Navy
- Years of service: 1863–1865
- Battles/wars: American Civil War

Charles Walhart Woodman (March 11, 1844 – March 18, 1898) was a U.S. representative from Illinois.

Woodman was born in Aalborg, Denmark and was educated in the schools of his native country. In 1863 Woodman emigrated to the United States arriving in Philadelphia and immediately enlisted in the Gulf Squadron of the United States Navy. He moved to Chicago in 1865, graduating from the law department of Chicago University in 1871. He was admitted to the Illinois bar the same year and commenced practice in Chicago. He was appointed prosecuting attorney of the lower courts in 1877 and Justice of the Peace by the judges of Cook County in 1881.

Woodman was elected as a Republican to the Fifty-fourth Congress (March 4, 1895 - March 3, 1897). He was an unsuccessful candidate for reelection in 1896 to the Fifty-fifth Congress. He was found insane from overwork by jury and confined in the asylum in Elgin, Illinois October 27, 1897.

He died in Elgin, Illinois, March 18, 1898. He was interred in Rosehill Cemetery in Chicago.

U.S. House of Representatives
Preceded by Julius Goldzier	Member of the U.S. House of Representatives from Illinois's 4th congressional district 1895-1897	Succeeded by Daniel W. Mills
