= John Patrick Hopkins =

American politician

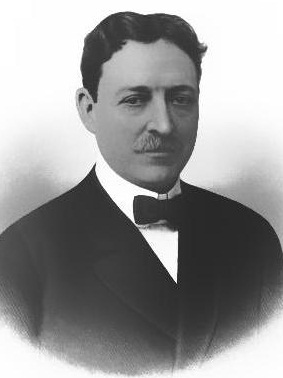

35th Mayor of Chicago
- In office December 27, 1893 – April 8, 1895
- Preceded by: Carter Harrison Sr. George Bell Swift (acting)
- Succeeded by: George Bell Swift

Personal details
- Born: October 29, 1858 Buffalo, New York, US
- Died: October 13, 1918 (aged 59) Chicago, Illinois, US
- Party: Democratic

John Patrick Hopkins (October 29, 1858 – October 13, 1918) was an American politician who served as the 35th mayor of Chicago from 1893 to 1895. A member of the Democratic Party, Hopkins was the first of nine Irish American Catholic mayors of Chicago.

Hopkins was a close friend and a political ally of Roger Charles Sullivan.

== Early life ==
Hopkins was born October 29, 1858, in Buffalo, New York. He was of Welsh descent.

He was the 3rd eldest son in a family of 12, and was educated in the common school

== Career ==
Because his brothers and father died when Hopkins was still young, he became a provider for his family. His first job at a foundry as a boy. He later worked in Buffalo's grain elevators,s where he would eventually be appointed as the weightmaster by the time he was 20.

In 1879, he moved to Chicago with his mother and sisters.

Shortly after he moved here, he found dressmaking work for his sisters, although it took himself a few months to find work.

He eventually found himself working as a laborer at the Pullman works. In April of 1881 he was appointed timekeeper in the store, and the following August he was promoted to general timekeeper. Two years later he was made paymaster by Mr. Pullman himself. From 1883 to 1885 he served as a paymaster for Pullman interests.

In 1888, he founded the Arcade Trading Co., which later became the Secord and Hopkins Co.

Hopkins was allegedly initially elected treasurer of Hyde Park Township as a Republican in 1885 for a term, although information supporting this claim is scarce. Despite this, he would go on to forge a career in Democratic politics.

=== Mayoralty ===
Hopkins was elected the 1893 Chicago mayoral special election, which was held after the assassination of mayor Carter Harrison Sr.

At 35 years of age when he took office, Hopkins became the youngest mayor the city had ever had.

His tenure was marred by numerous scandals, criticisms, and shortcomings. This included incidents of political corruption in the city, such as the Ogden Gas Scandal, rampant public gambling that drew the ire of the Chicago Civic Federation, an indecisive response by Hopkins to the Pullman Strike that was assailed by Republican press outlets. Additionally, the misappropriation of significant amounts of campaign contributions by Hopkins had upset many in the Chicago Democratic party, including those who belonged to the party's former Harrison faction.

Hopkins did not seek reelection in the 1895 Chicago mayoral election

=== Post-mayoralty ===
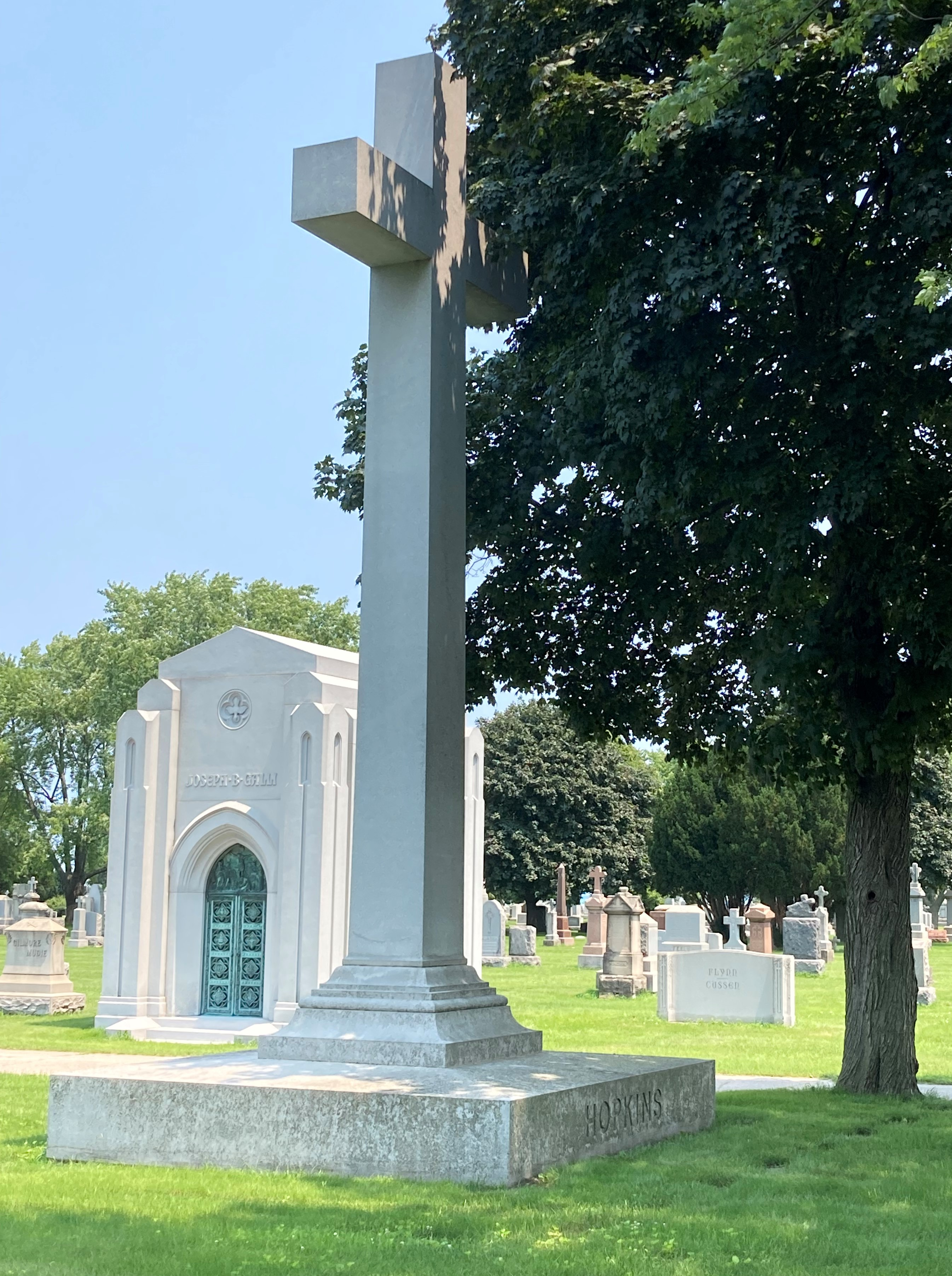
Hopkins' grave at Calvary Cemetery

Unsatisfied with the nomination of William Jennings Bryan at the 1896 Democratic National Convention, Hopkins was a delegate to the 1896 National Democratic National Convention (a splinter convention). Hopkins entered the convention hoping that it would nominate Henry Watterson for president and Thomas A. Moran (former Illinois judge) for vice president.

Hopkins died of the Spanish flu on October 13, 1918, in Chicago. He is buried in Calvary Cemetery in Evanston, Illinois.

== Personal life ==
Hopkins never married.
