= Victor Robinson (physician) =

American physician and author (1886–1947)

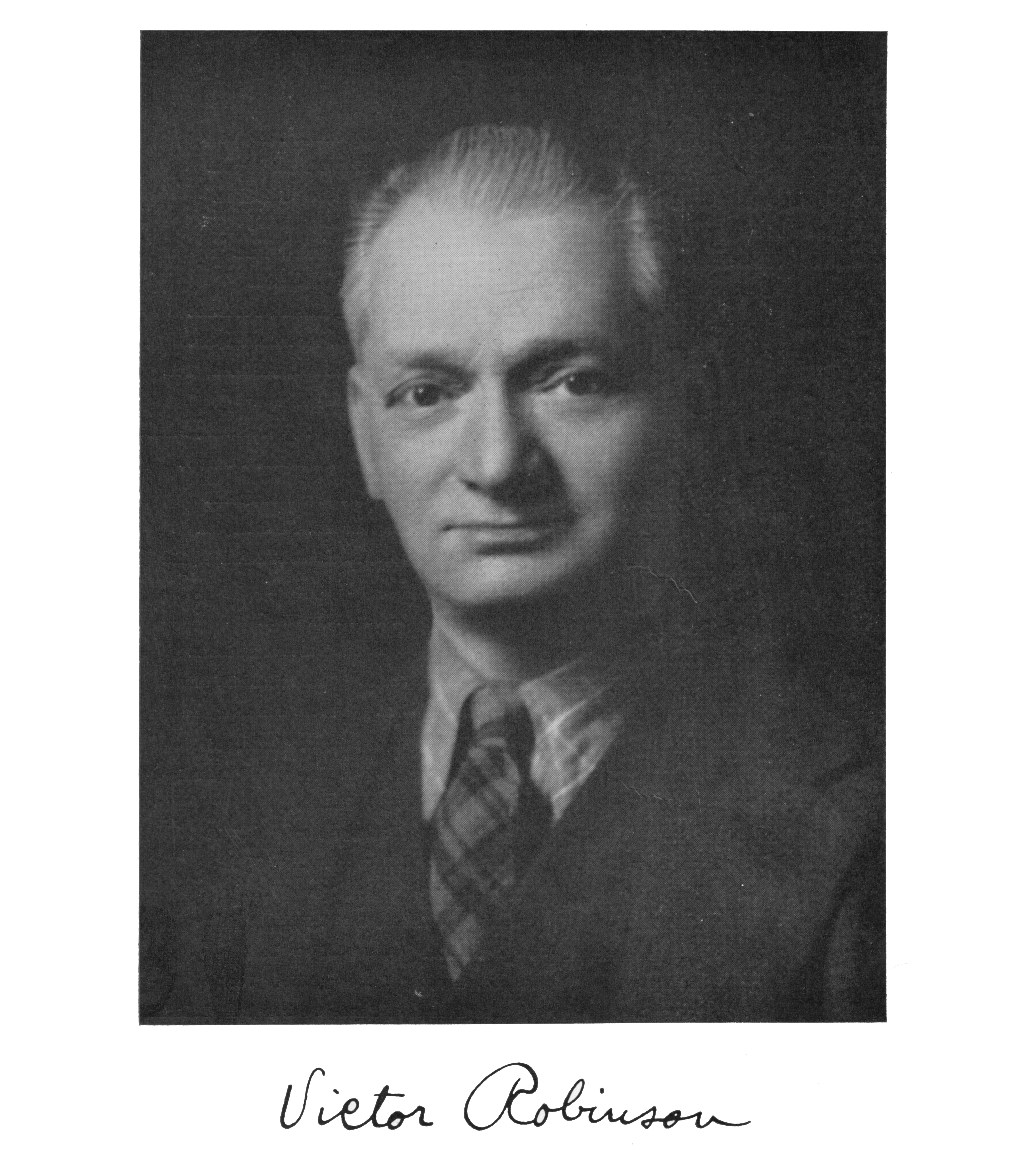
Victor Robinson

Victor Robinson (16 August 1886 – 15 January 1947) was a physician and medical journalist.

== Biography ==
In early childhood, he was brought to United States of America after being born in Ukraine. For two years, he studied at New York University School of Law before he went into pharmacy and took the Ph.G. at the New York College of Pharmacy in 1910. In the following year, he took Ph.C. at Columbia. In 1917, he took a doctor of medicine degree at Chicago College of Medicine and Surgery, which has since been incorporated into Loyola University. His father, William J. Robinson, was also a physician.

He is the author of several medical books, including An Essay on Hasheesh (1910) about cannabis and also founded the journal Medical Life. In 1924 he helped organize the History of Science Society.

A collection of his papers is held at the National Library of Medicine in Bethesda, Maryland.

== Books by Victor Robinson ==
- William Godwin and Mary Wollstonecraft (1907)
- The State: Its Historic Role (1908)
- Comrade Kropotkin (1908)
- A Symposium on Humanitarians (1909)
- An Essay on Hasheesh (1912) (ISBN 1434808971)
- Pathfinders in Medicine (1912)
- Poems (1913)
- The Don Quixote of Psychiatry: A Biography of Dr. Shobal Vail Clevenger (1919)
- Pioneers of Birth Control in England and America (1919)
- The Life of Jacob Henle (1921)
- The Story of Medicine (1931)
- Syllabus of Medical History (1933)
- Victory Over Pain: A History of Anesthesia (1946)
