= James A. Sexton =

American newspaper editor and politician (b. 1849, d. 1897)

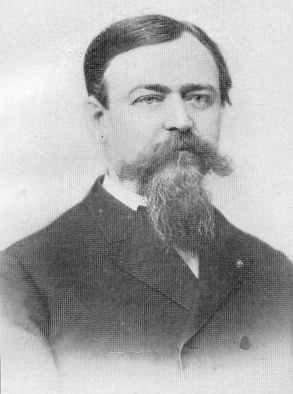
- Sexton, circa 1914

Commander-in-Chief of the Grand Army of the Republic
- In office 1898–1899
- Preceded by: John P. S. Gobin
- Succeeded by: William C. Johnson

Postmaster of Chicago
- In office 1889–1893
- Appointed by: Benjamin Harrison
- Preceded by: Walter C. Newberry
- Succeeded by: Washington Hesing

Personal details
- Born: January 5, 1844 Chicago, Illinois
- Died: February 5, 1899 (aged 55) Washington, D.C.
- Resting place: Rosehill Cemetery
- Party: Republican

Military service
- Allegiance: United States of America; Union
- Branch/service: United States Army; Union Army
- Years of service: 1861–1865
- Rank: Captain
- Battles/wars: American Civil War: Battle of Columbia; Battle of Spring Hill; Battle of Franklin

James Andrew Sexton (January 5, 1844 – February 5, 1899) was an American soldier, businessman, and Republican politician from Chicago who served as Commander-in-Chief of the Grand Army of the Republic until his death.

== Biography ==
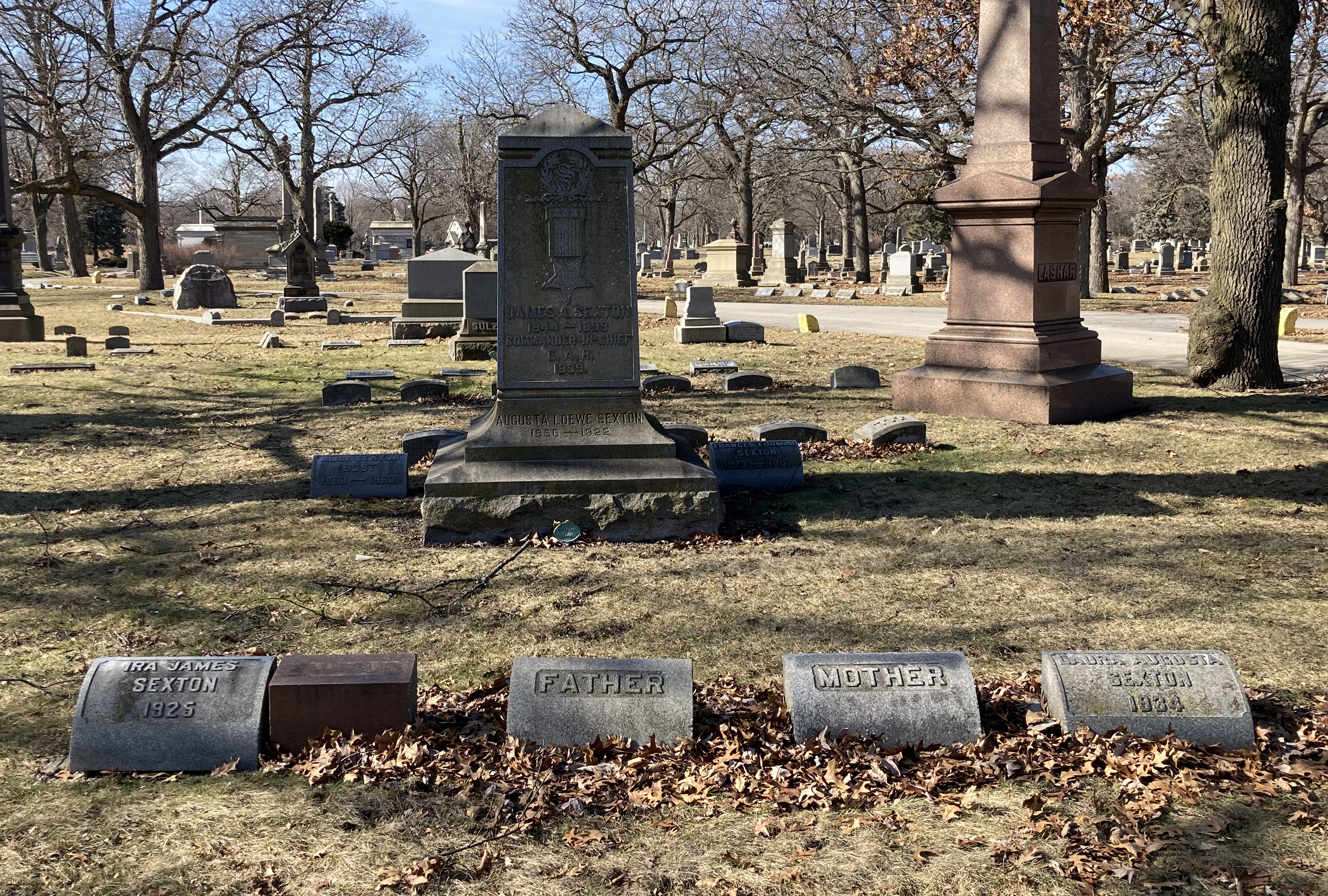
Sexton's grave at Rosehill Cemetery

Sexton was born in Chicago in 1844 and enlisted in the Union Army at the outbreak of the American Civil War, rising to captain and serving on the general staff of General William S. Smith. He participated in the Battles of Columbia, Spring Hill, and Franklin.

Following his service, Sexton returned to Chicago where he founded Cribbon, Sexton and Company, a stove manufacturing firm. Politically a Republican, Sexton served as an elector in the 1884 United States presidential election and was appointed postmaster of Chicago by newly elected President Benjamin Harrison in 1889, remaining in office until 1893.

He was also active in veteran's affairs and served as a colonel in the Illinois National Guard. He was chosen Commander-in-Chief of the Grand Army of the Republic in 1898, a position he filled until his death in Washington, D.C. at the age of 55. He was buried at Rosehill Cemetery in Chicago.
