= List of postmasters of Chicago =

A a post office was first established in Chicago on March 8, 1831, with Johnathan N. Baily, a fur trader, being appointed Chicago's first postmaster.

Chicago was long the hub of the Railway Mail Service of the United States. Chicago saw particularly large volumes of mail in the peak era of mail-order business by Chicago-based retailers Montgomery Ward and Sears.

== Postmasters appointed before 1971 ==
Until the establishment of the United States Postal Service in 1971, the president of the United States appointed local postmasters.

In the 19th century, many appointees of postal positions in the United States were patronage positions, with newspaper editors with close ties to the president's party often receiving postmastership positions.

| Name | Tenure | President appointed by | Notes | Citation(s) |
|---|---|---|---|---|
| Johnathan N. Baily | March 31, 1831–Nov. 2, 1832 | Andrew Jackson (Democrat) | First postmaster | |
| John S.C. Hogan | Nov. 2, 1832–1837 | Andrew Jackson (Democrat) | | |
| Sidney Abell | Mar. 3, 1837–1841 | Martin Van Buren (Democrat) | | |
| William Stuart | Jul. 10 1841–1845 | John Tyler (Whig) | | |
| Hart L. Stuart | Apr. 25, 1845–1849 | James K. Polk (Democrat) | | |
| Richard L. Wilson | Apr. 23, 1849–1850 | Zachary Taylor (Whig) | | |
| George W. Dole | Sep. 25, 1850–1853 | Millard Fillmore (Whig) | | |
| Isaac Cook | Mar. 22, 1853–1857 | Franklin Pierce (Democrat) | | |
| William Price | Mar. 18, 1857–1858 | James Buchanan (Democratic) | | |
| Isaac Cook | Mar. 9, 1858–1861 | James Buchanan (Democratic) | | |
| John Locke Scripps | March 28, 1861–Mar. 9, 1865 | Abraham Lincoln (Republican) | | |
| Samuel Hoard | Mar. 9, 1865–1866 | Abraham Lincoln (Republican) | | |
| Robert A. Gilmore | Nov. 16, 1866–1867 | Andrew Johnson (Democrat) | | |
| Francis Trowbridge Sherman | Aug. 27, 1867–1869 | Andrew Johnson (Democrat) | | |
| Francis A. Eastman | Apr. 5, 1869–1873 | Ulysses S. Grant (Republican) | | |
| John McArthur | Dec. 20, 1873–1877 | Ulysses S. Grant (Republican) | | |
| Francis Wayland Palmer | Feb. 26, 1877–1885 | Rutherford B. Hayes (Republican) | | |
| S. Corning Judd | May 5, 1885–1888 | Grover Cleveland (Democrat) | | |
| Walter C. Newberry | Nov. 19, 1888–1889 | Grover Cleveland (Democrat) | | |
| James A. Sexton | Apr. 16, 1889–1893 | Benjamin Harrison (Republican) | | |
| Washington Hesing | Nov. 25, 1893–1897 | Grover Cleveland (Democrat) | | |
| Charles Ulysses Gordon | Mar. 19, 1897–1901 | William McKinley (Republican) | | |
| Frederick E. Coyne | Mar. 19, 1901–1905 | William McKinley (Republican) | | |
| Fred A. Busse | Dec. 16, 1905–1907 | Theodore Roosevelt (Republican) | | |
| Daniel A. Campbell | Apr. 6, 1907–1917 | Theodore Roosevelt (Republican) | | |
| William B. Carlile | Mar. 16, 1917–1921 | Woodrow Wilson (Democrat) | | |
| Arthur C. Lueder | Aug. 24, 1921–1923 | Warren G. Harding (Republican) | Resigned in 1923 to unsuccessfully run for mayor of Chicago in that year's election as a Republican. | |
| Grant B. Miller | 1923 | Warren G. Harding | | (Republican) |
| Arthur C. Lueder | 1923–1933 | Warren G. Harding (Republican) | Reappointed postmaster after losing mayoral election. | |
| Ernest J. Kruetgen | Aug. 31, 1933–1948 (acting postmaster Aug. 31, 1933–Jan. 31, 1934) | Franklin D. Roosevelt (Democrat) | | |
| John Haderlein | Aug. 31, 1949–1952 (acting postmaster Aug. 31, 1948–Sep. 23, 1949) | Harry S. Truman (Democrat) | | |
| Vincent F. Werner (acting postmaster) | Aug. 31, 1952–Jul. 6, 1953 | Harry S. Truman (Democrat) | | |
| Carl A. Shroeder | Jul. 6, 1953–1961 (acting postmaster Jul. 6, 1953–Aug. 12, 1954) | Dwight D. Eisenhower (Republican) | | |
| Ralph G. Donegan (unofficial acting postmaster) | Sep. 15, 1961–Nov. 2, 1961 | —N/a | | |
| Harry H. Semrow | November 2, 1861–Mar. 1966 (acting postmaster Nov 2, 1961–Oct. 5, 1962) | John F. Kennedy (Democrat) | | |
| William Boschelli (acting postmaster) | Mar. 18, 1966–Sep. 1966 | Lyndon B. Johnson (Democrat) | | |
| Henry W. McGee Jr. | Nov. 5, 1966 and 1966–Mar. 1972 (acting postmaster Sep 23, 1966–Nov. 5, 1966) | Lyndon B. Johnson (Democrat) | First African American to hold the position | |

== Postmasters appointed after 1971 ==
| Name | Tenure | Notes | Citation(s) |
|---|---|---|---|
| Emmett E. Cooper Jr. | June 2, 1973–April 28, 1977 | Left post after being assigned regional postmaster general for the Eastern Region | |
| Frank C. Goldie | Jul 16, 1977–1987 | | |
| Janet Norfleet | April 4, 1987–December 1990 | First female postmaster of Chicago | |
| Norman L. Miller | Jan. 26, 1991–Jan. 1992 | | |
| Ormer Rogers Jr. | Apr. 18, 1992–Jan. 1993 | | |
| Jimmie Mason | Jan. 9, 1993–Jul. 1994 | | |
| Rufus Porter | Jul. 16, 1994–Apr. 2001 | | |
| Earl D. Flowers | Apr. 7, 2001–Aug. 2002 | | |
| Eric D. Chavez | Aug. 10, 2002–Aug. 2004 | | |
| Kelvin Mack | Aug. 7, 2004–Sep. 2006 | | |
| Gloria E. Tyson | May 26, 2009–Mar. 3, 2011 | | |
| Anthony B. Vaughan | Nov. 16, 2013–2016 | | |
| Tangela L. Bush | Oct. 29, 2016–Jan. 2018 | | |
| Wanda Prater | Sep. 1, 2018–June 12, 2021 | Was "officer in charge" prior to becoming postmaster | |
| Jewel Morrow | | | |

=== Officers in charge ===
The following individuals served as "officer in charge of the Chicago Post Office" during periods in which there was a vacancy in the position of postmaster of Chicago:

| Name | Tenure | Notes | Citation(s) |
|---|---|---|---|
| William G. Booras | 1972–1973 | | |
| William G. Booras | Apr. 18, 1972–Jun. 2, 1973 | | |
| Charles K. Kernan | Apr. 27 1977–Jul. 16, 1977 | | |
| Forest D. Anderson | Jan. 30, 1987–Apr. 4, 1987 | | |
| Ormer Rogers Jr. | Nov. 30, 1990–Jan. 26, 1991 | | |
| Dean Buchanan | Jan. 3, 1992–Apr. 18, 1992 | | |
| Kelvin Mack | May. 1, 2004–Aug. 7, 2006 | | |
| Gloria E. Tyson | Sep. 30, 2006–May 26, 2009 | | |
| Nancy Rettinhouse | Feb. 26, 2011–May 31, 2011 | | |
| Wanda Prater | Jan. 20, 2018–Sep. 1, 2018 | Became postmaster | |
| Eddie Morgan | June 2021–Jan. 2022 | | |
| Loretta Wilkins | appointed May 9, 2023 | | |
| Shoca Moore | | | |
| Holly Burrell | appointed Feb. 1, 2025 | | |

== See also ==
- Old Chicago Main Post Office
