= Roger Charles Sullivan =

American politician (1861–1920)

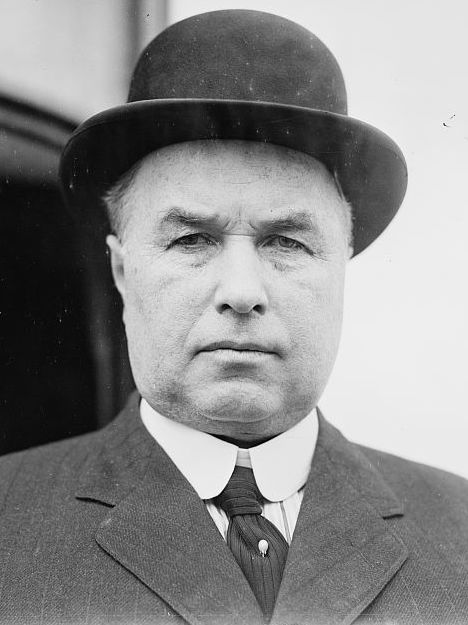
- Sullivan circa 1913

Chairman of the Cook County Democratic Party
- In office 1915–1920
- Preceded by: ???
- Succeeded by: George E. Brennan

Personal details
- Born: February 3, 1861 Belvidere, Illinois
- Died: April 14, 1920 (aged 59) Chicago, Illinois

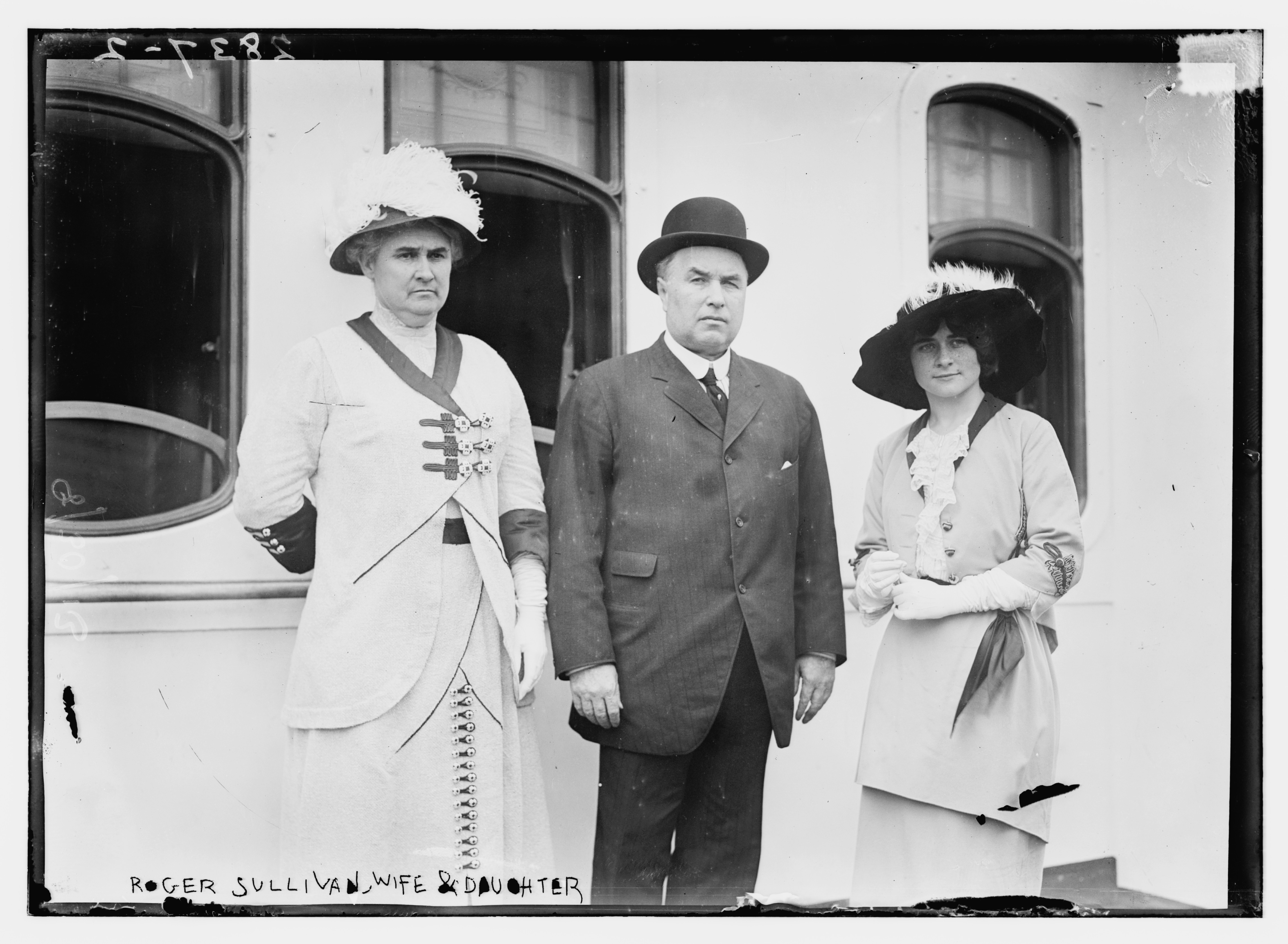
Sullivan with wife and daughter

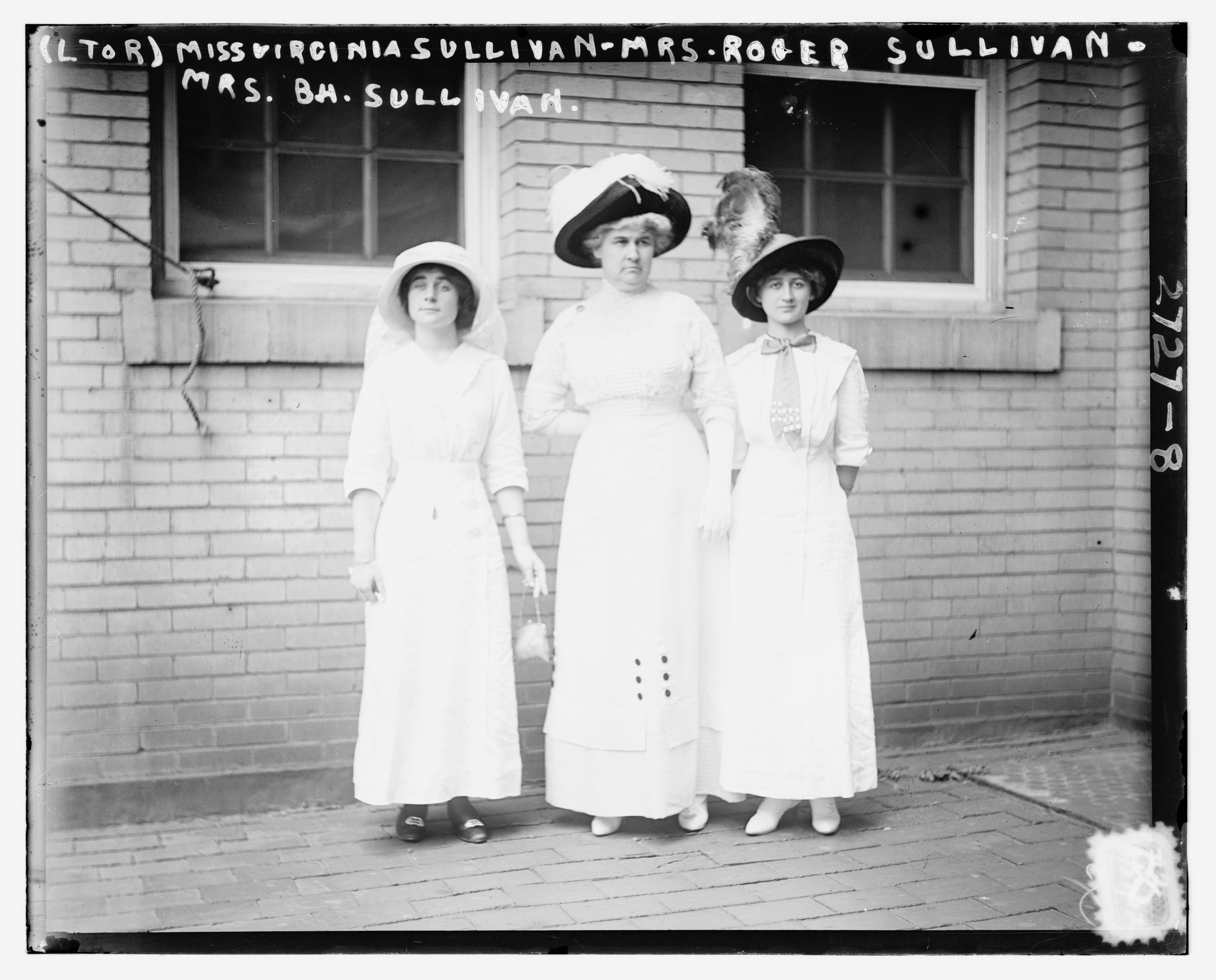
From left to right are: Virginia Hopkins Sullivan, Helen M. Quinlan Sullivan, and Mary Loretta Connery who was married to Boetius Henry Sullivan

Roger Charles Sullivan (February 3, 1861 – April 14, 1920), was a member of the Cook County Democratic Organization during the early twentieth century.

== Biography ==
Sullivan was born in Belvidere, Illinois, in 1861 the child of Irish immigrants.

Sullivan came to Chicago about 1879 to work in the railroad yards on the city's west side. He served only a single term in elective office, as the clerk of the Cook County Probate Court, to which he was elected in 1890. Thereafter, he accumulated influence within the tumultuous Cook County Democratic Party. He supported Grover Cleveland and opposed William Jennings Bryan in 1896, earning the permanent enmity of the Great Commoner. Dissatisfied with the nomination of Bryan at the 1896 Democratic National Convention, Sullivan was a delegate to the 1896 National Democratic National Convention (a splinter convention).

Sullivan dominated the Illinois Democratic Party for two decades and was a national figure during the age when urban Democratic organizations reached the height of their power and prestige. Sullivan became controversial when he became effectively the chief operating officer of the Ogden Gas Company and the Cosmopolitan Electric Company, about a year after the franchises of which were approved by the city council on 25 February 1895. There is no evidence that Sullivan in any way originated the idea for two companies, and he probably became first involved by convincing his political partner, Mayor John P. Hopkins not to veto the ordinances. The amount he made was reported by the New York Times to be $8,000,000, but the exact amount has been the subject of much speculation. His main political opponent within the local Democratic Party, five-time mayor Carter Harrison IV suggested in his autobiography that each of the original shareholders made about six hundred thousand dollars. However, this was based entirely on rumor and speculation. Shortly after the turn of the century, Sullivan, with the other owners leased much of the Ogden Gas Company's physical assets to People's Gas, the local gas monopoly, and in 1913, he and the others sold their shares outright. The total figures involved are unknown, but were doubtlessly substantial. Before this point, contrary to expectation, both companies began a profitable operation (quashing the belief that they were created to force the local gas monopoly to buy them out). However, by the standards of the time, there was nothing illegal about the franchise. Indeed, it involved many of the city's leading men, including the brother-in-law of Governor John P. Altgeld, who became a shareholder. Sullivan wealth was also derived from a number of independent business investments. The most notable of these was the Sawyer Biscuit Company, a corporation he organized with his brothers and others about 1900. This became one of the nation's leading manufacturers of cookies, crackers, and pastries. It eventually became part of Keebler. Roger C. Sullivan was never indicted for anything, nor even accused of any criminal activity even by his most vehement opponents. He counted among his personal friends such reformers as George Cole of the Municipal Voters League. The historian Forrest McDonald in his work on Samuel Insull has conceded that Sullivan introduced a new approach to municipal politics by forgoing raids on the public till, and confining himself and his associates profits from city contracts and jobs, all within the boundaries of the law. As Edward F. Dunne, progressive Democratic governor of Illinois (1913–1917) and Sullivan's political opponent, acknowledged in his History of Illinois, Sullivan's endorsement of women's suffrage, civil service, the direct primary, and the state regulation of utilities was an important factor in their realization in the state.

In 1902, Sullivan and his chief partner, John P. Hopkins, achieved control of the Illinois state committee. This formed a base for a long-running rivalry with Mayor Carter Harrison IV, (who was forced out of office in 1905, but returned to office in 1911) Sullivan was elected to the Democratic National Committee in 1906. This signaled his replacement of Hopkins (who retired from active politics) as leader of the faction. He engaged in a long-running feud with William Jennings Bryan that vaulted him to greater national prominence during the first decade of the twentieth century. The feud stemmed supposedly from Bryan's alleged belief that Sullivan's election to the national committee had been engineered through fraudulent means (which was not true), but in reality it was based in Bryan's long-term antipathy to Sullivan that originated in the Chicago Democratic being a leader of the Gold Democrats, who opposed the Great Commoner in 1896 with their own candidate, Illinois' John M. Palmer. Bryan's feud with Sullivan endured for decades, but he was never able to significantly undercut the Chicago's leaders power.

Their rivalry climaxed in the 1912 Democratic national convention when Sullivan, working with others, was successful in thwarting Bryan's attempt to deadlock the convention and thus secure the nomination himself. Sullivan played a critical role in delivering the nomination to Woodrow Wilson at the party's convention in Baltimore. He switched the votes of the Illinois delegation from Champ Clark of Missouri to Wilson on the 43rd ballot despite the fact that Clark won the state's primary by over one hundred thousand votes. While Clark blamed Bryan and not Sullivan for his loss, historians such as Charles Link have credited northern urban bosses such as Sullivan, Tom Taggart of Indiana and Charles Murphy of New York for Wilson's victory. It was said (though much that is "said" about the convention is questionable) that Sullivan and Indiana boss Thomas Taggart forged a deal with one of Wilson's aides in a Baltimore hotel room while all three men were clad in their pajamas; the deal allegedly involved putting Thomas Marshall on the ticket as vice president in exchange for the Indiana and Illinois delegations throwing their support to Wilson. When Clark lost, it was the first time a Democrat failed to obtain the party's nomination after securing a majority of the votes of the delegates in the convention since Martin Van Buren was denied the nomination in 1844.

Sullivan did not get as much for his trouble-as he hoped-he was denied complete control of federal patronage by the administration (until 1916) and it did little (thanks to Bryan, who was secretary of state) to help him when he ran for the U.S. Senate in Illinois in 1914. Sullivan lost despite having the opposition split between Progressives and Republicans, largely as a function of the G.O.P reuniting and claiming its place as the state's majority party. His supporters organized a Sullivan for vice-president movement at the 1916 Democratic convention in Denver, but there was no real chance of Wilson putting him on the ticket. He remained a national figure of great renown as Democratic boss of what was then the second largest city, and the third most populous state until his death in April 1920. When he died, his passing was greeted with expressions of grief from Woodrow Wilson, Republican Governor Frank Orren Lowden, and virtually the entire Illinois political establishment, reformist or not. Even his only personal enemy, Carter Harrison IV, who he had defeated for renomination for the mayor's office in 1915, offered his regrets.

He died on April 14, 1920, in Chicago, Illinois.

== Family ==
He married Helen M. Quinlan. They had one son, Boetius Sullivan, and four daughters: Frances, Helen, Mary and Virginia.

== Legacy ==
Roger C. Sullivan High School in Chicago, Illinois, is named after him.

Party political offices
First	Democratic nominee for U.S. Senator from Illinois (Class 3); 1914	Succeeded by Peter A. Waller
