= John Locke Scripps =

American lawyer and journalist

- Born: February 27, 1818; Cape Girardeau, Missouri
- Died: September 21, 1866 (aged 48)
- Occupations: Attorney, Journalist, Author
- Known for: Author of the first biography of Lincoln

John Locke Scripps (27 February 1818 – 21 September 1866) was an attorney, journalist, and author. He wrote the first published biography of Abraham Lincoln in 1860. He was the first cousin once removed of E.W. Scripps, the founder of E. W. Scripps Company.

John Locke Scripps was born in Cape Girardeau, Missouri to George Henry Scripps, a merchant who was licensed as a Methodist preacher, but never followed the trade.

John was educated at McKendree College (now McKendree University), in Lebanon, IL. He settled in Chicago in 1847 to practice law, but soon turned to journalism. He was the founder of the Chicago Democratic Press, which was bought by the Chicago Tribune in 1858. The paper was known as The Chicago Press and Tribune until 1860, when the name was changed to the Chicago Daily Tribune. Scripps was for some years the chief editor of the Tribune.

Scripps was later named postmaster of Chicago (28 March 1861 - 9 March 1865) by President Lincoln. As postmaster, Scripps was an innovator, conceiving and implementing the use of the streetcar system to help move the mail.

During the presidential campaign of 1860 he wrote a biography of Lincoln which appeared in the Chicago tribune on 19 May 1860, the day after the convention. Lincoln then approached Scripps to expand upon the biography for a campaign publication. Lincoln himself gave assistance in the writing of the biography. It is widely considered to be the first published biography of Lincoln. While it was published by the Lincoln campaign and Lincoln himself contributed, it was not an authorized biography. When Scripps finished writing, he had too little time before publication to submit the book to Lincoln himself for fact checking. In fact, in a list of books that Lincoln read as a child, Scripps added Plutarch's Lives of the Noble Greeks and Romans. In a letter to Lincoln, Scripps asked Lincoln to read it at once if he had not, so as to make Scripps' statement true.

The biography was republished in 1900 by the Cranbrook Press of Detroit, in a version edited by Scripps' daughter Grace.

On 24 October 1848, he married Mary Elizabeth Blanchard (b. 2 January 1825), daughter of Seth Blanchard of Greenville, IL. She was educated at Monticello Seminary, Godfrey IL. They had three children together, George Blanchard Scripps (b. 20 September 1849), Mary Virginia Scripps (b. 13 February 1851), and Grace Locke Scripps (b. 11 September 1863).

Mary died suddenly on January 1, 1866. John died later that year on September 21.
