= George Bell Swift =

American politician

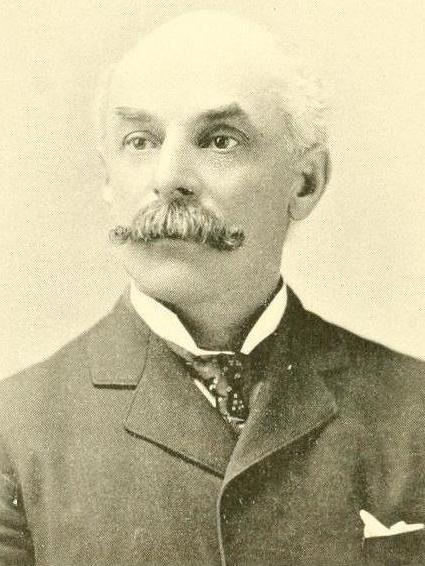
- Swift in 1896

36th Mayor of Chicago
- In office April 8, 1895 – April 15, 1897
- Preceded by: John Patrick Hopkins
- Succeeded by: Carter Harrison IV
- Acting; November 9, 1893 – December 27, 1893
- Preceded by: Carter Harrison III
- Succeeded by: John Patrick Hopkins

Mayor Pro Tempore of the Chicago City Council
- In office 1893

Chicago Alderman from the 11th Ward
- In office 1892–1894 Serving with William D. Kent
- Preceded by: Walter M. Pond
- Succeeded by: Alexander H. Watson
- In office 1879–1881 Serving with Amos G. Throop (1879–1880); Thomas N. Bond (1880–1881)
- Preceded by: Ansel B. Cooke
- Succeeded by: Thaddeus Dean

Deputy City Clerk of Chicago
- In office 1885–1886

Personal details
- Born: December 14, 1845 Cincinnati, Ohio
- Died: July 2, 1912 (aged 66) Chicago, Illinois
- Resting place: Rosehill Cemetery
- Party: Republican
- Spouse: Lucy L. Brown
- Children: Brown F. Swift, Herbert B. Swift, George L. Swift, Grace Bell Bachelder, Adelaide Pearl Taylor, Eldred B. Swift, Edith L. Swift

George Bell Swift (December 14, 1845 – July 2, 1912) was an American politician who served as mayor of Chicago, Illinois (1893; 1895–1897) for the Republican Party. He was selected to replace the assassinated Carter Harrison III on a temporary basis as mayor pro tem in 1893 and lost a bid for election as mayor later that year. He was elected mayor when he ran in 1895.

== Early life and career ==
Chicago Tribune illustration of Swift at the 1888 Cook County Republican Party convention

Swift was born in Cincinnati, Ohio to Samuel W. Swift and Elizabeth Swift (born Bell). His family moved to Galena, Illinois when he was young. By his teenage years, the family was living in Chicago. Prior to serving as mayor of Chicago, Swift served two terms as an alderman from the 11th Ward (one term from 1879 to 1881 and one term from 1892 until 1894, the latter of which he was serving during his acting mayoralty in 1893). From 1887 to 1889, he was the city's Commissioner of Public Works.

Swift was a proponent of the City Beautiful movement.

== Acting mayoralty ==
After the assassination of Carter Harrison III, the Chicago City Council selected Swift to serve as pro tempore in a heated meeting on November 4, 1893. As mayor pro tempore, Swift would be the city's acting mayor, serving until a new mayor would be elected. Swift was sworn in as acting mayor on November 9, 1893. The following month, he lost the special election to fill the remainder of Harrison's term, being defeated by Democrat John Patrick Hopkins. Hopkins took office as mayor on December 27, 1893, ending Swift's acting mayoralty.

== Mayoralty ==
In 1895, Swift was elected mayor of Chicago, defeating Democratic nominee Frank Wenter by a broad margin. Swift was sworn in as mayor on April 8, 1895.

Swift declined to seek reelection in 1897, and was succeeded by Democrat Carter Harrison IV on April 15, 1897.

Party political offices
Preceded by John A. Roche	Republican nominee for Mayor of Chicago; 1893 (sp.), 1895	Succeeded by Nathaniel C. Sears
