= Chicago Civic Federation =

Illinois research organization

The Civic Federation is a Chicago-based non-partisan research organization focused on governments in the Chicago area and the state of Illinois. The Civic Federation's mission is to help local and state governments reduce their costs and improve public services by "Promoting opportunities to reform local tax structures; guarding against wasteful expenditure of public funds; and serving as a technical resource to public officials and opinion leaders through non-partisan tax and fiscal research." The Federation was founded to fight corruption, government subsidies, high taxes, and unneeded public enterprise. However it also wanted government to solve the problems of the metropolis. The newspapers adopted Mugwumpery as a way of building support for municipal reform among working-class voters in the late 19th century and the Progressive Era.

== Research focus ==
The Civic Federation publishes reports and commentary about government tax policies, government services and public expenditures in the Chicago region. Its annual analyses of local government operating budgets evaluate the governments' fiscal policy decisions and provide recommendations for effective financial management. These reports are often cited by the press and have helped guide lawmakers' decisions, as detailed on the Federation's website. The Federation focuses on the following governments:

- Chicago Park District
- Chicago Public Schools
- Chicago Transit Authority
- City Colleges of Chicago
- City of Chicago
- Cook County
- Cook County Health and Hospitals System
- DuPage County
- Forest Preserve District of Cook County
- Metropolitan Water Reclamation District of Greater Chicago
- State of Illinois

Of major interest to the Civic Federation is the impact that public employee pension systems have on government budgets and finance. In standalone pension status reports and government budget analyses, the Civic Federation provides a look at pension funding trends, estimates the accumulated liabilities of the systems and suggests reforms that could improve the fiscal health of the systems. The issue of property tax assessments, collections and appeals is another major focus of the Civic Federation. The Federation has published a number of issue briefs on property tax issues in the Chicago area.

The Federation has also taken on special initiatives in addition to its regular government finance research. Some of those projects include:

- A call for the creation of a separate board for the Forest Preserve District of Cook County
- The dissolution and restructuring of the Illinois International Port District
- An analysis of the financial aspects of the Chicago 2016 Olympic Bid

The Civic Federation also discusses government finance and policy issues on its blog, updated weekly. The Federation blog has researched topics such as Cook County township government, privatization and tax increment financing or TIF. Federation blog posts accompany its publications and help provide additional commentary and context on those topics as well as provide reactions to current events.

== Institute for Illinois' Fiscal Sustainability ==
In 2008 the Federation established the Institute for Illinois' Fiscal Sustainability (IIFS), which examines fiscal issues relating to the state of Illinois. Its mission is to "improve the state's decision making process by providing timely fiscal policy analysis and recommendations to state officials, the media, and the public through education and digital outreach." Major funding for IIFS is provided by the John D. and Catherine T. MacArthur Foundation. The institute has published numerous studies of Illinois' finances, including:

- Analyses of the enacted State of Illinois FY2011 and FY2010 budgets;
- The Cost of the Crisis, an issue brief that estimated how much extra Illinois would spend in borrowing costs due to its deteriorating bond rating;
- A "Fiscal Rehabilitation" plan that described the basis of Illinois' fiscal crisis and presented the Federation's plan for restoring fiscal solvency to the state's finances;
- Analyses of the Illinois Governor's proposed FY2011, FY2010 and FY2009 operating and capital budgets;
- An issue brief on the Illinois Medicaid system.

IIFS also publishes a blog that provides additional information and commentary on state finance issues.

== History ==
The Civic Federation was founded in 1893 as a reform organization by several of Chicago's most prominent citizens, including Jane Addams, Bertha Honore Palmer and Lyman J. Gage. The group united around the need to address concerns about Chicago's economic, political and moral climate at the end of the 19th century. The group's formation was catalyzed by a book by a visiting journalist, William T. Stead, who appealed to the Social Gospel sensibilities of Protestant activists. Gage, president of the First National Bank, and the prominent socialite Bertha Honore Palmer were elected president and First Vice President. The Director of Hull House, Jane Addams, served as a trustee. Chicago-area merchants, educators, bankers, ministers and labor officials joined them as charter members. In its early years, the Civic Federation advocated for social and political reform. It led efforts to improve sanitation and education, as well as improve Chicago-area government efficiency. Steel magnate Clayton Mark, who built Marktown, the planned worker community in Northwest Indiana, served several terms as President of the Civic Federation.

In the 1930s, the Civic Federation transitioned to an organization chiefly interested in improving government efficiency and tax reform. The work of the Federation continues to evolve in the 21st century as a greater emphasis is placed on working with government officials to improve the efficiency, effectiveness and accountability of Chicago-area governments.

DePaul University Special Collections and Archives holds the Civic Federation Collection, which contains reports, memoranda, correspondence, press releases, photographs, and other documents relating to the Civic Federation's foundation and operation from 1893, on.

== Funding ==
The Civic Federation is classified as a 501(c)(3) public charity under U.S. Internal Revenue Code. The Civic Federation focuses on educational outreach and policy work, consistent with its tax-exempt status. It accepts no government support.

The Federation receives funding from its members, which include many Chicago area corporations and service firms.

The Civic Federation and Institute for Illinois' Fiscal Sustainability are also supported by a number of foundations including:

- The John D. and Catherine T. MacArthur Foundation
- The Chicago Community Trust
- The Commercial Club Foundation
- The Joyce Foundation
- Motorola Foundation
- Searle Funds at The Chicago Community Trust
- The Elizabeth Morse Genius Charitable Trust
- The McCormick Foundation
- The Polk Bros. Foundation
- The Field Foundation of Illinois
- Woods Fund of Chicago
- Crown Family Philanthropies
- Robert Wood Johnson Foundation
