= Mayoral elections in Chicago =

Elections since 1837

Chicago has held regularly scheduled popular elections to select the city's mayor ever since it was incorporated as a city in 1837.

Chicago currently holds regularly scheduled mayoral elections once every four years, in years prior to a presidential election.

Beginning with its 1999 mayoral election, Chicago has used a nonpartisan two-round system. Under this system, if no candidate secures an outright majority of the first-round vote a runoff will be held between the top-two finishers. No runoff is held if a candidate has secured an outright majority in the first round. Thus far, three elections (2015, 2019, 2023) have necessitated a runoff.

Up through its 1995 mayoral election, Chicago had formerly utilized partisan plurality voting.

== History ==
Chicago was incorporated as a town in 1833. At that point it was governed by a board of trustees who were elected annually at large and elected a president from among themselves. Chicago's incorporation as a city in 1837 eliminated such a model in favor of a common council elected from wards and a separate office of mayor who was elected at large.

From 1838 through 1860, mayoral elections were held on the first Tuesday of March. From 1861 through 1867 they were held on the first Monday in April. From 1869 through 1875 they were held on the first Tuesday after the first Monday in November. After 1876, they were held on the first Tuesday of April.

An act passed on March 4, 1837, had required that voters in municipal elections would need to be residents of the wards in which they voted and must be freeholders. An act passed on March 1, 1841, removed the requirement that voters be freeholders. Under the law of 1849-50 requirements were added, mandating (at the time) that voters reside in the town where they voted and must have lived in the state of Illinois for at least a year.

In 1875, the election guidelines outlined in the original city charter were abandoned in favor of those outlined in the Cities and Villages Act of 1872, which changed the date of mayoral elections (mandating that they be scheduled for the last Tuesday in April of odd-numbered years). Ambiguity concerning the effect this would have on the scheduling of the next election led to the April 1876 election that was later considered by the courts to be null and void. In addition, the mayoral term length (which up to this point had been one year) was extended by the 1872 Act to two years. Term length was subsequently further extended to four years in 1907.

In time for the 1911 election the Illinois legislature passed a law which scheduled Chicago mayoral party primaries for the last Tuesday of February.

On June 26, 1913, Illinois became the first state east of the Mississippi River to grant women's suffrage. 1915 was the first Chicago mayoral election to be held following this change.

Since 1935, elections to the Chicago City Council (which were extended to four years) have coincided with all regularly scheduled mayoral elections.

The 1995 election was the final mayoral election to be partisan. Beginning in 1999, elections have taken place on a non-partisan basis, with a system requiring that a candidate obtain a majority of the vote (if no candidate achieves this in the initial vote, a runoff is held between the top-two finishers). Under this new system, the initial round of voting is held on the last Tuesday of February (when party primaries were formerly scheduled), with any runoff taking place in April.

Additionally, the change in election laws that took effect for the 1999 election raised the number of signatures required for candidates to be included on the ballot from 3,000 to 25,000. This requirement, however, was halved to 12,500 before the 2007 election.

== Term length ==
There is not currently, nor has there ever been, a term limit on the mayoralty of Chicago. Terms were originally one year in length before being extended to two years in 1875 by the Cities and Villages Act of 1872. Term length was subsequently further extended to four years in 1907.

| Years | Term length |
|---|---|
| 1837−1875 | 1 year |
| 1875−1907 | 2 years |
| 1907−present | 4 years |

== Current election laws ==
There are no term limits for Chicago's mayoral office.

Chicago's mayoral elections are currently nonpartisan. A candidate receiving a majority of votes cast will be declared elected. If no candidate receives a majority of the vote, a runoff election will be held between the two candidates who received the highest and second highest number of votes in the first round. The initial round of voting takes place on the last Tuesday of February, and any runoff takes place in April.

Mayoral candidates must be a registered voter who has resided in the City of Chicago for at least one year before the date of the election.

Individuals will be barred from taking office if, at the time required for them to take the oath of office, they are in arrears in the payment of tax or other indebtedness due to the City of Chicago. They will also be unable to take office if they have been convicted in any United States court of any infamous crime, bribery, perjury, or other felony.

A term of office lasts four years, from the third Monday in May until a successor is elected and qualified to assume office.

In order to be included on the ballot candidates must submit 12,500 valid signatures. Signatures cannot be collected more than four months in advance of the submission of a candidate's petition. Individuals are not permitted to sign multiple candidates' petitions, they may sign only a single mayoral candidate's petition.

Any candidate may have their petition challenged. Those candidates with properly filed challenges against their petitions will have their candidature subjected to hearings and procedures which will to assess the validity of their petitions.

If any candidate fails to file a statement of economic interests within five days of having their petition certified, then their certification will be revoked.

Write-in candidates must file a notarized declaration of intent to be a write-in candidate by a deadline. An extended deadline to do this is allotted to candidates whose petitions were rejected after this deadline due to the outcome of a challenge.

The order in which the candidates are listed on ballots is determined by the order in which their petitions were received (with those received earlier listed first and those received later being listed last). Lotteries are held to resolve instances in which petitions which were received simultaneously. The ballots of all candidates who were waiting in line to submit their petitions at 9:00 a.m. on the first day for petition filing will be deemed as having simultaneously filed at 9:00 a.m. They will be the first candidates listed, with a lottery being held to determine their order. Similarly, all candidates that filed within the last hour of the filing deadline will be deemed to have filed simultaneously. They will be the last candidates listed, and a lottery will be held to determine their order.

== Candidates ==
=== Demographics ===
All but three of the individuals that have been elected mayor of Chicago have been White (the exceptions being African-American mayors Harold Washington, Lori Lightfoot and Brandon Johnson). Additionally, all but two of the individuals that have been elected mayor of Chicago have been male (the exceptions being Jane Byrne and Lori Lightfoot).

==== African American/Black candidates ====
Harold Washington, Lori Lightfoot, and Brandon Johnson are the only African Americans to be elected mayor, and are three of only four to have served as mayor (joined by Eugene Sawyer, who was appointed mayor following Washington's death in office)

African Americans who had unsuccessfully sought election as mayor prior to Washington's first successful campaign in 1983 include Washington himself in 1977; Dick Gregory in 1967; Richard H. Newhouse Jr. and Willie Mae Reid in 1975; Andrew Pulley in 1979 and Sheila A. Jones in 1983.

The 2019 election made history not just by electing Chicago's first Black woman as mayor, but by having two African American women candidates, Lori Lightfoot and Toni Preckwinkle, be the ones to advance to the runoff. Additionally, a record eleven African American candidates filed to run in the 2019 election (Conrien Hykes Clark, Dorothy Brown, Amara Enyia, La Shawn Ford, Ja'Mal Green, Neal Sales-Griffin, Lori Lightfoot, Sandra Mallory, Toni Preckwinkle, Roger L. Washington, Willie Wilson). William "Dock" Walls and Troy LaRaviere had also been candidates in that election, but dropped out without officially filing petitions.

African Americans who had unsuccessfully sought election as mayor after Washington died in office and before the 2019 election include Timothy C. Evans, Sheila A. Jones Eugene Sawyer, and James C. Taylor in 1989; James Warren in 1991: Danny K. Davis in both 1991 and 2011; Joseph E. Garner and Lawrence C. Redmond in 1995; Roland Burris in both 1995 and 2011; Bobby Rush in 1999; Paul Jakes, Joseph McAfee and Patricia McAllister in 2003; Dorothy Brown in 2007; William "Dock" Walls III in 2007, 2015, and 2019; Carol Moseley Braun, Patricia Van Pelt Watkins, and James Meeks in 2011; Amara Enyia and Willie Wilson in 2015.

In the 2023 Chicago mayoral election, seven of the nine candidates on the ballot were Black (with one remaining candidate being Latino and the other being White).

==== Asian Pacific American candidates ====
No Asian Pacific American has either been elected or otherwise served as mayor of Chicago One Asian Pacific American candidate ran in the 2019 mayoral election, (Neal Sales-Griffin)

==== Catholic candidates ====
John Patrick Hopkins was the first Catholic to be elected mayor. Subsequent Catholics to be elected mayor include Edward Fitzsimmons Dunne, William Emmett Dever, Edward Joseph Kelly, Martin H. Kennelly, Richard J. Daley, Michael Anthony Bilandic, Jane Byrne, Richard M. Daley. Additionally, Frank J. Corr served as mayor after being elected by City Council.

==== Hispanic candidates ====
No Hispanic individual has either been elected or otherwise served as mayor of Chicago The first "hispanic" (Mexican/Native American) to run for mayor was former 25th Ward Alderman and Illinois State Representative, Attorney Juan M. Soliz. Several Hispanic candidates have unsuccessfully sought election as mayor in the past including William E. Rodriguez in 1911; Gery Chico and Miguel del Valle in 2011; Jesús "Chuy" García in 2015; Gery Chico, Neal Sales-Griffin, and Susana Mendoza in 2019.

==== Irish American candidates ====
Twelve of Chicago's mayors have been Irish Americans. These include John Patrick Hopkins (the first to serve as mayor) Edward Fitzsimmons Dunne, William Emmett Dever, Edward Joseph Kelly, Martin H. Kennelly, Richard J. Daley, and Richard M. Daley. It also includes Frank J. Corr, who was appointed acting mayor by City Council.

==== Jewish candidates ====
Rahm Emanuel is the only Jewish person to have been elected mayor. No Jews have otherwise served as mayor Jews who had unsuccessfully sought election as mayor prior to Emanuel's first successful campaign in 2011 include William Singer in 1975 and Bernard Epton in 1983.

==== LGBTQ candidates ====
No openly LGBTQ individual had previously been elected or otherwise served as mayor of Chicago before 2019. In 2019, Lori Lightfoot became the first openly lesbian mayor in Chicago history

==== Women candidates ====
Jane Byrne and Lori Lightfoot are the only women to have been elected mayor of Chicago. No woman has otherwise served as Mayor of Chicago

Women who had unsuccessfully sought election as mayor prior to Byrne's successful campaign in 1979 include Grace Gray in 1935 (the first woman ever to file to run for mayor of Chicago) and Willie Mae Reid in 1975

Women who have unsuccessfully sought election as mayor since Byrne won election include Byrne herself (she unsuccessfully ran in 1983, 1987, and 1991); Sheila A. Jones in 1983 and 1989; Patricia McAllister in 2003; Dorothy Brown in 2007; Carol Moseley Braun and Patricia Van Pelt Watkins in 2011; and Amara Enyia in 2015

Seven women had filed to be candidates in the 2019 election: Dorothy A. Brown Cook, Catherine Brown D'Tycoon, Amara Enyia, Lori Lightfoot, Sandra L. Mallory, Susana Mendoza, and Toni Preckwinkle. Enyia, Lightfoot, Mendoza, and Preckwinkle were among the fourteen candidates that qualified for the ballot. The election saw Lightfoot and Preckwinkle both advance to a runoff which Lightfoot won.

In the 2023 election, in which Lightfoot lost re-election, only one other was a candidate: Sophia King.

==== Foreign-born candidates ====
Only two foreign-born individuals have been elected or otherwise served as mayor, Joseph Medill and Anton Cermak.

Among the notable unsuccessful mayoral contenders who were foreign born was 2015 runner-up Jesús "Chuy" García; William Boldenweck (unsuccessful contender for the 1901 Republican nomination); and John Peter Altgeld (1899 independent candidate and unsuccessful contender for the 1901 Democratic nomination).

=== Familial relations ===
Over the years there have been a number of familial relations between elected mayors, as well as between mayoral candidates.

The Daley family has had a strong presence in Chicago mayoral politics. Richard J. Daley and his son Richard M. Daley both served as mayor. Richard J. Daley's son (and Richard M. Daley's brother) Bill Daley unsuccessfully ran in the 2019 mayoral election, finishing third in the first round of voting.

Another father-son duo who had both occupied the mayor's office was Carter Harrison III and Carter Harrison IV

1955 Republican nominee Robert E. Merriam was the son of 1911 Republican nominee (and unsuccessful 1919 Republican primary candidate) Charles E. Merriam. Both Merriams lost their elections.

1919 candidate Maclay Hoyne was the grandson of Thomas Hoyne, victor of the voided 1876 election

The 1891 Chicago mayoral election saw two relatives run against each other. Republican candidate Hempstead Washburne and Citizens candidate Elmer Washburn (former Director of the United States Secret Service and former Chicago Police Chief) were both members of the Washburn family. Elmer Washburn was cousins with Hempstead Washburne's father Elihu B. Washburne. Hempstead Washburne ultimately won the election, with Elmer Washburn coming in fourth-place.

=== Write-in candidates ===
While write-in candidates have been permitted, none have achieved much success in general elections. The only arguable exception to this is Thomas Hoyne, who ran a write in campaign in the disputed April 1876 election that courts ruled invalid.

Under Chicago's previous partisan election system, write-in candidates were allowed in party primaries as well as the general election. Ed Vrdolyak won the 1989 Republican primary as a write-in candidate.

=== Number of candidates on ballot ===
The following graph and table provide information regarding the number of candidates who participated in each election. The graph and table only consider candidates that were listed on the ballot/ticket (thus, write-in candidates are not counted). It also excludes any candidates for which all votes were counted as "invalid".

For partisan elections (those held up through 1995), the number of candidates represented are those on the general election ballot. For elections held under Chicago's current (nonpartisan) system (first implemented in 1999), the following graph and table represents the number of candidates in the initial round (February election).

The 2019 election saw a record 14 candidates on the ballot.

==== Number of candidates by election ====
The following table sorts individual elections by how many candidates ran: (Note: For more-modern elections (using Election Board-printed ballots), this counts candidates who qualified for inclusion on the ballot. Write-in candidates are not included in this. For the city's earliest elections, this is a count of how many candidates were run as nominees by party's or citizens' committees.)

| # of Candidates | Elections |
|---|---|
| 14 | 2019 |
| 9 | 2023 |
| 8 | 1897 |
| 7 | 1901 |
| 6 | 1899, 1903, 1919, 2011 |
| 5 | 1891, 2015 |
| 4 | 1849, 1851, 1852, 1881, 1889, 1893 (Apr), 1905, 1907, 1915, 1977, 1991, 1995, 2003 |
| 3 | 1842, 1843, 1844 (Mar), 1844 (Apr), 1845, 1846, 1847, 1850, 1876 (Jul), 1879, 1885, 1887, 1895, 1911, 1923, 1927, 1935, 1939, 1975, 1979, 1983, 1987, 1989, 2007 |
| 2 | 1837, 1838, 1839, 1840, 1841, 1848, 1853, 1854, 1855, 1856, 1857, 1858, 1859, 1860, 1861, 1862, 1863, 1865, 1867, 1869, 1871, 1873, 1877 1883, 1893 (Dec), 1931, 1943, 1947, 1951, 1955, 1959, 1963, 1967, 1971, 1999 |
| 0 | 1876 (Apr)^{E} |

== Results ==
=== Nonpartisan elections (1999–present) ===
Starting with the 1999 election, all Chicago mayoral elections are nonpartisan. Additionally, a second-round (runoff) is held when no candidate reaches a majority in the initial vote.

| Election | First round | | | | | | Second round | | | | | | Sources |
| Election | Winner/top finisher | Votes | | Runner(s)-up^{A} | Votes | | Winner | Votes | | Runner-up | Votes | | Sources |
| Election | Winner/top finisher | # | % | Runner(s)-up^{A} | # | % | Winner | # | % | Runner-up | # | % | Sources |
| 2023 | Paul Vallas | 185,743 | 32.90 | Brandon Johnson | 122,093 | 21.63 | Brandon Johnson | 318,007 | 52.13 | Paul Vallas | 292,055 | 47.87 | |
| 2023 | Paul Vallas | 185,743 | 32.90 | Lori Lightfoot (incumbent) | 94,890 | 16.81 | Brandon Johnson | 318,007 | 52.13 | Paul Vallas | 292,055 | 47.87 | |
| 2023 | Paul Vallas | 185,743 | 32.90 | Jesús "Chuy" García | 77,222 | 13.68 | Brandon Johnson | 318,007 | 52.13 | Paul Vallas | 292,055 | 47.87 | |
| 2023 | Paul Vallas | 185,743 | 32.90 | Willie Wilson | 51,567 | 9.13 | Brandon Johnson | 318,007 | 52.13 | Paul Vallas | 292,055 | 47.87 | |
| 2023 | Paul Vallas | 185,743 | 32.90 | Ja'Mal Green | 12,257 | 2.17 | Brandon Johnson | 318,007 | 52.13 | Paul Vallas | 292,055 | 47.87 | |
| 2023 | Paul Vallas | 185,743 | 32.90 | Kam Buckner | 11,902 | 1.96 | Brandon Johnson | 318,007 | 52.13 | Paul Vallas | 292,055 | 47.87 | |
| 2023 | Paul Vallas | 185,743 | 32.90 | Sophia King | 7,191 | 1.27 | Brandon Johnson | 318,007 | 52.13 | Paul Vallas | 292,055 | 47.87 | |
| 2023 | Paul Vallas | 185,743 | 32.90 | Roderick Sawyer | 2,440 | 0.43 | Brandon Johnson | 318,007 | 52.13 | Paul Vallas | 292,055 | 47.87 | |
| 2019 | Lori Lightfoot | 97,667 | 17.54 | Toni Preckwinkle | 89,343 | 16.04 | Lori Lightfoot | 386,039 | 73.70 | Toni Preckwinkle | 137,765 | 26.30 | |
| 2019 | Lori Lightfoot | 97,667 | 17.54 | Bill Daley | 82,294 | 14.78 | Lori Lightfoot | 386,039 | 73.70 | Toni Preckwinkle | 137,765 | 26.30 | |
| 2019 | Lori Lightfoot | 97,667 | 17.54 | Willie Wilson | 59,072 | 10.61 | Lori Lightfoot | 386,039 | 73.70 | Toni Preckwinkle | 137,765 | 26.30 | |
| 2019 | Lori Lightfoot | 97,667 | 17.54 | Susana Mendoza | 50,373 | 9.05 | Lori Lightfoot | 386,039 | 73.70 | Toni Preckwinkle | 137,765 | 26.30 | |
| 2019 | Lori Lightfoot | 97,667 | 17.54 | Amara Enyia | 44,589 | 8.00 | Lori Lightfoot | 386,039 | 73.70 | Toni Preckwinkle | 137,765 | 26.30 | |
| 2019 | Lori Lightfoot | 97,667 | 17.54 | Jerry Joyce | 40,099 | 7.20 | Lori Lightfoot | 386,039 | 73.70 | Toni Preckwinkle | 137,765 | 26.30 | |
| 2019 | Lori Lightfoot | 97,667 | 17.54 | Gery Chico | 34,521 | 6.20 | Lori Lightfoot | 386,039 | 73.70 | Toni Preckwinkle | 137,765 | 26.30 | |
| 2019 | Lori Lightfoot | 97,667 | 17.54 | Paul Vallas | 30,236 | 5.43 | Lori Lightfoot | 386,039 | 73.70 | Toni Preckwinkle | 137,765 | 26.30 | |
| 2015 | Rahm Emanuel (incumbent) | 218,217 | 45.63 | Jesús "Chuy" García | 160,414 | 33.55 | Rahm Emanuel (incumbent) | 319,543 | 55.7 | Jesús "Chuy" García | 253,981 | 44.3 | |
| 2015 | Rahm Emanuel (incumbent) | 218,217 | 45.63 | Willie Wilson | 50,960 | 10.66 | Rahm Emanuel (incumbent) | 319,543 | 55.7 | Jesús "Chuy" García | 253,981 | 44.3 | |
| 2015 | Rahm Emanuel (incumbent) | 218,217 | 45.63 | Robert Fioretti | 35,363 | 7.39 | Rahm Emanuel (incumbent) | 319,543 | 55.7 | Jesús "Chuy" García | 253,981 | 44.3 | |
| 2011 | Rahm Emanuel | 326,331 | 55.27 | Gery Chico | 141,228 | 23.92 | —N/a | | | | | | |
| 2011 | Rahm Emanuel | 326,331 | 55.27 | Miguel del Valle | 54,689 | 9.26 | —N/a | | | | | | |
| 2011 | Rahm Emanuel | 326,331 | 55.27 | Carol Moseley Braun | 53,062 | 8.99 | —N/a | | | | | | |
| 2007 | Richard M. Daley (incumbent) | 324,519 | 71.05 | Dorothy A. Brown | 91,878 | 20.12 | —N/a | | | | | | |
| 2007 | Richard M. Daley (incumbent) | 324,519 | 71.05 | William Walls | 40,368 | 8.84 | —N/a | | | | | | |
| 2003 | Richard M. Daley (incumbent) | 363,553 | 78.46 | Paul Jakes | 64,941 | 14.02 | —N/a | | | | | | |
| 2003 | Richard M. Daley (incumbent) | 363,553 | 78.46 | Patricia McAllister | 27,343 | 5.90 | —N/a | | | | | | |
| 1999 | Richard M. Daley (incumbent) | 428,872 | 71.9 | Bobby Rush | 167,709 | 28.1 | —N/a | | | | | | |

=== Partisan elections (1837–1995) ===
Prior to the 1999 election, Chicago's mayoral elections were partisan (candidates ran on party-lines).

Parties

Democratic Whig Liberty Independent Democrat Independent Temperance Party Republican Know Nothing/American People's Socialist Labor/Socialist Party USA Union Citizens Independent Republican Municipal Ownership Cook County Labor Party People's Ownership Smash Crime Rings Solidarity Harold Washington

| Election | Winner | Votes | | Runner(s)-up^{A} | Votes | | Sources |
| Election | Winner | # | % | Runner(s)-up^{A} | # | % | Sources |
|---|---|---|---|---|---|---|---|
| 1995 | Richard M. Daley (incumbent) | 360,372 | 60.12 | Roland Burris | 217,315 | 36.25 | |
| 1991 | Richard M. Daley (incumbent) | 450,581 | 70.64 | R. Eugene Pincham | 160,302 | 25.13 | |
| 1989 (special) | Richard M. Daley | 557,141 | 55.43 | Timothy C. Evans | 428,105 | 41.11 | |
| 1987 | Harold Washington (incumbent) | 600,290 | 53.78 | Edward Vrdolyak | 468,493 | 41.96 | |
| 1983 | Harold Washington | 668,176 | 51.72 | Bernard Epton | 610,926 | 47.99 | |
| 1979 | Jane Byrne | 700,874 | 82.05 | Wallace D. Johnson | 137,663 | 16.12 | |
| 1977 (special) | Michael Bilandic (incumbent) | 490,688 | 77.39 | Dennis H. Block | 135,282 | 21.34 | |
| 1975 | Richard J. Daley (incumbent) | 542,817 | 77.67 | John J. Hoellen Jr. | 139,335 | 19.94 | |
| 1971 | Richard J. Daley (incumbent) | 740,137 | 70.08 | Richard Friedman | 315,969 | 29.92 | |
| 1967 | Richard J. Daley (incumbent) | 792,238 | 73.04 | John L. Waner | 272,542 | 25.13 | |
| 1963 | Richard J. Daley (incumbent) | 679,497 | 55.69 | Ben Adamowski | 540,705 | 44.31 | |
| 1959 | Richard J. Daley (incumbent) | 778,612 | 71.40 | Timothy P. Sheehan | 311,940 | 28.60 | |
| 1955 | Richard J. Daley | 708,660 | 54.93 | Robert E. Merriam | 581,461 | 45.07 | |
| 1951 | Martin H. Kennelly (incumbent) | 697,871 | 56.14 | Robert L. Hunter | 545,326 | 43.86 | |
| 1947 | Martin H. Kennelly | 919,593 | 58.73 | Russell Root | 646,239 | 41.27 | |
| 1943 | Edward J. Kelly (incumbent) | 685,567 | 54.54 | George B. McKibbin | 571,547 | 45.47 | |
| 1939 | Edward J. Kelly (incumbent) | 822,469 | 56.12 | Dwight H. Green | 638,068 | 43.54 | |
| 1935 | Edward J. Kelly (incumbent) | 798,150 | 75.84 | Emil C. Wetten | 166,571 | 15.83 | |
| 1935 | Edward J. Kelly (incumbent) | 798,150 | 75.84 | Newton Jenkins | 87,726 | 8.34 | |
| 1931 | Anton Cermak | 671,189 | 58.46 | William Hale Thompson (incumbent) | 476,922 | 41.54 | |
| 1927 | William Hale Thompson | 515,716 | 51.58 | William Emmett Dever (incumbent) | 432,678 | 43.28 | |
| 1927 | William Hale Thompson | 515,716 | 51.58 | John Dill Robertson | 51,347 | 5.14 | |
| 1923 | William E. Dever | 390,413 | 56.61 | Arthur C. Lueder | 258,094 | 37.42 | |
| 1923 | William E. Dever | 390,413 | 56.61 | William A. Cunnea | 41,186 | 5.97 | |
| 1919 | William Hale Thompson (incumbent) | 259,828 | 37.61 | Robert M. Sweitzer | 238,206 | 34.48 | |
| 1919 | William Hale Thompson (incumbent) | 259,828 | 37.61 | Maclay Hoyne | 110,851 | 16.05 | |
| 1919 | William Hale Thompson (incumbent) | 259,828 | 37.61 | John Fitzpatrick | 55,990 | 8.11 | |
| 1915 | William Hale Thompson | 398,538 | 58.78 | Robert M. Sweitzer | 251,061 | 37.03 | |
| 1911 | Carter Harrison Jr. | 177,997 | 48.53 | Charles Edward Merriam | 160,672 | 43.80 | |
| 1911 | Carter Harrison Jr. | 177,997 | 48.53 | William E. Rodriguez | 24,825 | 6.77 | |
| 1907 | Fred A. Busse | 164,702 | 49.03 | Edward Fitzsimmons Dunne (incumbent) | 151,779 | 45.18 | |
| 1905 | Edward Fitzsimmons Dunne | 163,189 | 49.74 | John Maynard Harlan | 138,548 | 42.23 | |
| 1905 | Edward Fitzsimmons Dunne | 163,189 | 49.74 | John Collins | 23,034 | 7.02 | |
| 1903 | Carter Harrison Jr. (incumbent) | 146,208 | 47.22 | Graeme Stewart | 138,648 | 44.78 | |
| 1901 | Carter Harrison Jr. (incumbent) | 156,766 | 52.69 | Elbridge Hanecy | 128,413 | 43.16 | |
| 1899 | Carter Harrison Jr. (incumbent) | 148,498 | 48.58 | Zina R. Carter | 107,437 | 35.15 | |
| 1899 | Carter Harrison Jr. (incumbent) | 148,498 | 48.58 | John Peter Altgeld | 47,169 | 15.43 | |
| 1897 | Carter Harrison Jr. | 148,850 | 50.23 | John Maynard Harlan | 69,730 | 23.53 | |
| 1897 | Carter Harrison Jr. | 148,850 | 50.23 | Nathaniel C. Sears | 59,542 | 20.08 | |
| 1897 | Carter Harrison Jr. | 148,850 | 50.23 | Washington Hesing | 15,427 | 5.21 | |
| 1895 | George Bell Swift | 143,884 | 55.09 | Frank Wenter | 103,125 | 39.48 | |
| 1893 (special) | John Patrick Hopkins | 112,959 | 49.71 | George Bell Swift (incumbent) | 111,660 | 49.14 | |
| 1893 | Carter Harrison Sr. | 114,237 | 54.03 | Samuel W. Allerton | 93,148 | 44.06 | |
| 1891 | Hempstead Washburne | 46,957 | 28.83 | DeWitt Clinton Cregier (incumbent) | 46,558 | 28.59 | |
| 1891 | Hempstead Washburne | 46,957 | 28.83 | Carter Harrison Sr. | 42,931 | 26.36 | |
| 1891 | Hempstead Washburne | 46,957 | 28.83 | Elmer Washburn | 24,027 | 14.75 | |
| 1889 | DeWitt Clinton Cregier | 57,340 | 54.93 | John A. Roche (incumbent) | 46,328 | 44.38 | |
| 1887 | John A. Roche | 51,249 | 68.23 | Robert S. Nelson | 23,490 | 31.27 | |
| 1885 | Carter Harrison Sr. (incumbent) | 43,352 | 50.09 | Sidney Smith | 42,977 | 49.66 | |
| 1883 | Carter Harrison Sr. (incumbent) | 41,226 | 57.11 | Eugene Cary | 30,963 | 42.89 | |
| 1881 | Carter Harrison Sr. (incumbent) | 35,668 | 55.22 | John M. Clark | 27,925 | 43.23 | |
| 1879 | Carter Harrison Sr. | 25,685 | 44.28 | Abner Wright | 20,496 | 35.33 | |
| 1879 | Carter Harrison Sr. | 25,685 | 44.28 | Ernst Schmidt | 11,829 | 20.39 | |
| 1877 | Monroe Heath (incumbent) | 30,881 | 61.36 | Perry H. Smith | 19,449 | 38.64 | |
| 1876 (special) | Monroe Heath | 19,248 | 63.90 | Mark Kimball | 7,509 | 24.93 | |
| 1876 (special) | Monroe Heath | 19,248 | 63.90 | James J. McGrath | 3,363 | 11.17 | |
| 1876 (invalid) ^{B} | Thomas Hoyne | 33,064 | 97.59 | | | | |
| 1873 | Harvey Doolittle Colvin | 28,791 | 60.83 | Lester L. Bond (incumbent) | 18,540 | 39.17 | |
| 1871 | Joseph Medill | 16,125 | 72.92 | Charles C. P. Holden | 5,988 | 27.08 | |
| 1869 | Roswell B. Mason | 19,826 | 63.47 | George W. Gage | 11,410 | 36.53 | |
| 1867 | John Blake Rice (incumbent) | 11,904 | 59.89 | Francis Cornwall Sherman | 7,971 | 40.11 | |
| 1865 | John Blake Rice | 11,078 | 66.42 | Francis Cornwall Sherman (incumbent) | 5,600 | 33.58 | |
| 1863 | Francis Cornwall Sherman | 10,252 | 50.39 | Thomas B. Bryan | 10,095 | 49.62 | |
| 1862 | Francis Cornwall Sherman | 7,437 | 54.32 | Charles N. Holden | 6,254 | 45.68 | |
| 1861 | Julian S. Rumsey | 8,274 | 55.62 | Thomas B. Bryan | 6,601 | 44.38 | |
| 1860 | John Wentworth | 9,998 | 53.36 | Walter S. Gurnee | 8,739 | 46.64 | |
| 1859 | John Charles Haines (incumbent) | 8,587 | 52.63 | Marcus D. Gilman | 7,728 | 47.37 | |
| 1858 | John Charles Haines | 8,642 | 53.60 | Daniel Brainard | 7,481 | 46.40 | |
| 1857 | John Wentworth | 5,933 | 55.06 | Benjamin Carver | 4,842 | 44.94 | |
| 1856 | Thomas Dyer | 4,712 | 53.24 | Francis Cornwall Sherman | 4,138 | 46.76 | |
| 1855 | Levi Boone | 3,185 | 52.87 | Isaac Lawrence Milliken (incumbent) | 22,839 | 47.13 | |
| 1854 | Isaac Lawrence Milliken | 3,800 | 50.79 | Amos G. Throop | 2,556 | 40.21 | |
| 1853 | Charles McNeill Gray | 3,270 | 77.10 | Josiah L. James | 971 | 22.90 | |
| 1852 | Walter S. Gurnee (incumbent) | 1,741 | 39.04 | James Curtiss | 1,295 | 29.05 | |
| 1852 | Walter S. Gurnee (incumbent) | 1,741 | 39.04 | Amos G. Throop | 1,153 | 25.85 | |
| 1852 | Walter S. Gurnee (incumbent) | 1,741 | 39.04 | Peter Page | 271 | 6.0 | |
| 1851 | Walter S. Gurnee | 3,032 | 56.66 | Eli B. Williams | 1,092 | 20.41 | |
| 1851 | Walter S. Gurnee | 3,032 | 56.66 | James Curtiss (incumbent) | 1,001 | 18.71 | |
| 1850 | James Curtiss | 1,697 | 45.51 | Levi Boone | 1,227 | 32.90 | |
| 1850 | James Curtiss | 1,697 | 45.51 | Lewis C. Kerchival | 805 | 21.59 | |
| 1849 | James H. Woodworth (incumbent) | 2,668 | 80.02 | Timothy Wait | 399 | 11.97 | |
| 1849 | James H. Woodworth (incumbent) | 2,668 | 80.02 | Lewis C. Kerchival | 245 | 7.35 | |
| 1848 | James H. Woodworth | 1,971 | 59.15 | James Curtiss (incumbent) | 1,361 | 40.85 | |
| 1847 | James Curtiss | 1,281 | 46.77 | Philo Carpenter | 1,220 | 44.54 | |
| 1847 | James Curtiss | 1,281 | 46.77 | John H. Kinzie | 238 | 8.69 | |
| 1846 | John Putnam Chapin | 1,104 | 55.20 | Charles Follansbee | 667 | 33.35 | |
| 1846 | John Putnam Chapin | 1,104 | 55.20 | Philo Carpenter | 229 | 11.45 | |
| 1845 | Augustus Garrett | 1,072 | 50.66 | John H. Kinzie | 913 | 43.15 | |
| 1845 | Augustus Garrett | 1,072 | 50.66 | Henry Smith | 131 | 6.19 | |
| April 1844 | Alson Sherman | 837 | 50.51 | Augustus Garrett (incumbent) | 694 | 41.88 | |
| April 1844 | Alson Sherman | 837 | 50.51 | Henry Smith | 126 | 7.60 | |
| March 1844 (voided) ^{C} | Augustus Garrett (incumbent) | 805 | 44.82 | George Dole | 798 | 44.43 | |
| March 1844 (voided) ^{C} | Augustus Garrett (incumbent) | 805 | 44.82 | Henry Smith | 193 | 10.75 | |
| 1843 | Augustus Garrett | 671 | 61.17 | Thomas Church | 432 | 44.31 | |
| 1842 | Benjamin Wright Raymond | 490 | 50.26 | Augustus Garrett | 432 | 44.31 | |
| 1842 | Benjamin Wright Raymond | 490 | 50.26 | Henry Smith | 53 | 5.44 | |
| 1841 | Francis Cornwall Sherman | 460 | 52.33 | Isaac R. Gavin | 419 | 47.67 | |
| 1840 | Alexander Loyd | 582 | 57.91 | Benjamin Wright Raymond (incumbent) | 423 | 42.09 | |
| 1839 | Benjamin Wright Raymond | 353 | 62.48 | James Curtiss | 212 | 37.52 | |
| 1838 | Buckner Stith Morris | 377 | 54.25 | William Jones | 318 | 45.76 | |
| 1837 | William B. Ogden | 470 | 66.86 | John H. Kinzie | 233 | 33.14 | |

==== Party nominee vote share by election ====
The follow table displays the results which parties achieved for elections in which they put forth a singular nominee

| Election | Dem. | Rep. | Whig | Liberty/ Free Soil | Know Noth. | Pop. | SWP | SPA | SLP | HWP | Prohib./ Temper. | SDP | IL Sol. | United Lab. | Winning party | Sources |
|---|---|---|---|---|---|---|---|---|---|---|---|---|---|---|---|---|
| 1995 | 60.12% | 2.77% | —N/a | —N/a | —N/a | —N/a | —N/a | —N/a | —N/a | 0.86% | —N/a | —N/a | —N/a | —N/a | Democratic | Sources |
| 1991 | 67.98% | 3.53% | —N/a | —N/a | —N/a | —N/a | 0.54% | —N/a | —N/a | 24.18% | —N/a | —N/a | —N/a | —N/a | Democratic | |
| 1989 | 55.42% | 3.56% | —N/a | —N/a | —N/a | —N/a | —N/a | —N/a | —N/a | 41.13% | —N/a | —N/a | —N/a | —N/a | Democratic | |
| 1987 | 53.76% | 4.29% | —N/a | —N/a | —N/a | —N/a | —N/a | —N/a | —N/a | —N/a | —N/a | —N/a | 42.68% | —N/a | Democratic | |
| 1983 | 51.70% | 48.01% | —N/a | —N/a | —N/a | —N/a | —N/a | —N/a | —N/a | —N/a | —N/a | —N/a | —N/a | —N/a | Democratic | |
| 1979 | 82.05% | 16.12% | —N/a | —N/a | —N/a | —N/a | 1.83% | —N/a | —N/a | —N/a | —N/a | —N/a | —N/a | —N/a | Democratic | |
| 1977 | 77.39% | 21.34% | —N/a | —N/a | —N/a | —N/a | 0.87% | —N/a | —N/a | —N/a | —N/a | —N/a | —N/a | —N/a | Democratic | |
| 1975 | 77.69% | 19.93% | —N/a | —N/a | —N/a | —N/a | 2.37% | —N/a | —N/a | —N/a | —N/a | —N/a | —N/a | —N/a | Democratic | |
| 1971 | 70.08% | 29.92% | —N/a | —N/a | —N/a | —N/a | —N/a | —N/a | —N/a | —N/a | —N/a | —N/a | —N/a | —N/a | Democratic | |
| 1967 | 73.04% | 25.13% | —N/a | —N/a | —N/a | —N/a | —N/a | —N/a | —N/a | —N/a | —N/a | —N/a | —N/a | —N/a | Democratic | |
| 1963 | 55.69% | 44.31% | —N/a | —N/a | —N/a | —N/a | —N/a | —N/a | —N/a | —N/a | —N/a | —N/a | —N/a | —N/a | Democratic | |
| 1959 | 71.40% | 28.60% | —N/a | —N/a | —N/a | —N/a | —N/a | —N/a | —N/a | —N/a | —N/a | —N/a | —N/a | —N/a | Democratic | |
| 1955 | 54.93% | 45.07% | —N/a | —N/a | —N/a | —N/a | —N/a | —N/a | —N/a | —N/a | —N/a | —N/a | —N/a | —N/a | Democratic | |
| 1951 | 56.14% | 43.87% | —N/a | —N/a | —N/a | —N/a | —N/a | —N/a | —N/a | —N/a | —N/a | —N/a | —N/a | —N/a | Democratic | |
| 1947 | 58.73% | 41.27% | —N/a | —N/a | —N/a | —N/a | —N/a | —N/a | —N/a | —N/a | —N/a | —N/a | —N/a | —N/a | Democratic | |
| 1943 | 54.54% | 45.47% | —N/a | —N/a | —N/a | —N/a | —N/a | —N/a | —N/a | —N/a | —N/a | —N/a | —N/a | —N/a | Democratic | |
| 1939 | 56.12% | 43.54% | —N/a | —N/a | —N/a | —N/a | —N/a | —N/a | —N/a | —N/a | —N/a | —N/a | —N/a | —N/a | Democratic | |
| 1935 | 75.84% | 15.83% | —N/a | —N/a | —N/a | —N/a | —N/a | —N/a | —N/a | —N/a | —N/a | —N/a | —N/a | —N/a | Democratic | |
| 1931 | 58.44% | 41.53% | —N/a | —N/a | —N/a | —N/a | —N/a | —N/a | —N/a | —N/a | —N/a | —N/a | —N/a | —N/a | Democratic | |
| 1927 | 43.28% | 51.58% | —N/a | —N/a | —N/a | —N/a | —N/a | nil % | —N/a | —N/a | —N/a | —N/a | —N/a | —N/a | Republican | |
| 1923 | 56.61% | 37.42% | —N/a | —N/a | —N/a | —N/a | —N/a | 5.97% | —N/a | —N/a | —N/a | —N/a | —N/a | —N/a | Democratic | |
| 1919 | 34.48% | 37.61% | —N/a | —N/a | —N/a | —N/a | —N/a | 3.49% | 0.27% | —N/a | —N/a | —N/a | —N/a | —N/a | Republican | |
| 1915 | 37.03% | 58.78% | —N/a | —N/a | —N/a | —N/a | —N/a | 3.61% | —N/a | —N/a | 0.59% | —N/a | —N/a | —N/a | Republican | |
| 1911 | 48.53% | 43.81% | —N/a | —N/a | —N/a | —N/a | —N/a | 6.77% | —N/a | —N/a | —N/a | —N/a | —N/a | —N/a | Democratic | |
| 1907 | 45.18% | 49.03% | —N/a | —N/a | —N/a | —N/a | —N/a | 4.00% | —N/a | —N/a | 1.79% | —N/a | —N/a | —N/a | Republican | |
| 1905 | 49.74% | 42.23% | —N/a | —N/a | —N/a | —N/a | —N/a | 7.02% | —N/a | —N/a | 1.00% | —N/a | —N/a | —N/a | Democratic | |
| 1903 | 47.22% | 44.78% | —N/a | —N/a | —N/a | —N/a | —N/a | 3.59% | 0.33% | —N/a | 0.86% | —N/a | —N/a | —N/a | Democratic | |
| 1901 | 52.69% | 43.16% | —N/a | —N/a | —N/a | —N/a | —N/a | 1.78% | 0.23% | —N/a | 1.12% | 0.69% | —N/a | —N/a | Democratic | |
| 1899 | 48.58% | 35.15% | —N/a | —N/a | —N/a | —N/a | —N/a | —N/a | 0.38% | —N/a | 0.34% | 0.12% | —N/a | —N/a | Democratic | |
| 1897 | 50.23% | 20.08% | —N/a | —N/a | —N/a | —N/a | —N/a | —N/a | 0.42% | —N/a | 0.31% | —N/a | —N/a | —N/a | Democratic | |
| 1895 | 39.68% | 55.36% | —N/a | —N/a | —N/a | 4.93% | —N/a | —N/a | —N/a | —N/a | —N/a | —N/a | —N/a | —N/a | Republican | |
| 1893 (Dec) | 49.71% | 49.14% | —N/a | —N/a | —N/a | 0.24% | —N/a | —N/a | —N/a | —N/a | —N/a | —N/a | —N/a | —N/a | Democratic | |
| 1893 (Apr) | 54.03% | 44.06% | —N/a | —N/a | —N/a | —N/a | —N/a | —N/a | 0.47% | —N/a | —N/a | —N/a | —N/a | —N/a | Democratic | |
| 1891 | 28.59% | 28.83% | —N/a | —N/a | —N/a | —N/a | —N/a | —N/a | 1.46% | —N/a | —N/a | —N/a | —N/a | —N/a | Republican | |
| 1889 | 54.93% | 44.38% | —N/a | —N/a | —N/a | —N/a | —N/a | —N/a | 0.29% | —N/a | 0.39% | —N/a | —N/a | —N/a | Democratic | |
| 1887 | —N/a | 68.23% | —N/a | —N/a | —N/a | —N/a | —N/a | —N/a | —N/a | —N/a | 0.40% | —N/a | —N/a | 31.27% | Republican | |
| 1885 | 50.09% | 49.66% | —N/a | —N/a | —N/a | —N/a | —N/a | —N/a | —N/a | —N/a | 0.26% | —N/a | —N/a | —N/a | Democratic | |
| 1883 | 57.11% | 42.89% | —N/a | —N/a | —N/a | —N/a | —N/a | —N/a | —N/a | —N/a | —N/a | —N/a | —N/a | —N/a | Democratic | |
| 1881 | 55.22% | 43.23% | —N/a | —N/a | —N/a | —N/a | —N/a | —N/a | 0.37% | —N/a | —N/a | —N/a | —N/a | —N/a | Democratic | |
| 1879 | 44.28% | 35.33% | —N/a | —N/a | —N/a | —N/a | —N/a | —N/a | 20.39% | —N/a | —N/a | —N/a | —N/a | —N/a | Democratic | |
| 1877 | 38.64% | 61.36% | —N/a | —N/a | —N/a | —N/a | —N/a | —N/a | —N/a | —N/a | —N/a | —N/a | —N/a | —N/a | Republican | |
| 1876 (Jul) | 24.93% | 63.90% | —N/a | —N/a | —N/a | —N/a | —N/a | —N/a | —N/a | —N/a | —N/a | —N/a | —N/a | —N/a | Republican | |
| 1876 (Apr)^{B} | —N/a | —N/a | —N/a | —N/a | —N/a | —N/a | —N/a | —N/a | —N/a | —N/a | —N/a | —N/a | —N/a | —N/a | Independent Democrat | |
| 1873 | —N/a | —N/a | —N/a | —N/a | —N/a | —N/a | —N/a | —N/a | —N/a | —N/a | —N/a | —N/a | —N/a | —N/a | People's Party | |
| 1871 | 27.08% | —N/a | —N/a | —N/a | —N/a | —N/a | —N/a | —N/a | —N/a | —N/a | —N/a | —N/a | —N/a | —N/a | Union-Fireproof | |
| 1869 | —N/a | 36.53% | —N/a | —N/a | —N/a | —N/a | —N/a | —N/a | —N/a | —N/a | —N/a | —N/a | —N/a | —N/a | Citizens | |
| 1867 | 40.11% | 59.89% | —N/a | —N/a | —N/a | —N/a | —N/a | —N/a | —N/a | —N/a | —N/a | —N/a | —N/a | —N/a | Republican | |
| 1865 | 33.58% | 66.42% | —N/a | —N/a | —N/a | —N/a | —N/a | —N/a | —N/a | —N/a | —N/a | —N/a | —N/a | —N/a | Republican | |
| 1863 | 50.39% | 49.62% | —N/a | —N/a | —N/a | —N/a | —N/a | —N/a | —N/a | —N/a | —N/a | —N/a | —N/a | —N/a | Democratic | |
| 1862 | 54.32% | 45.68% | —N/a | —N/a | —N/a | —N/a | —N/a | —N/a | —N/a | —N/a | —N/a | —N/a | —N/a | —N/a | Democratic | |
| 1861 | 44.38% | 55.62% | —N/a | —N/a | —N/a | —N/a | —N/a | —N/a | —N/a | —N/a | —N/a | —N/a | —N/a | —N/a | Republican | |
| 1860 | 46.64% | 53.36% | —N/a | —N/a | —N/a | —N/a | —N/a | —N/a | —N/a | —N/a | —N/a | —N/a | —N/a | —N/a | Republican | |
| 1859 | 47.37% | 52.63% | —N/a | —N/a | —N/a | —N/a | —N/a | —N/a | —N/a | —N/a | —N/a | —N/a | —N/a | —N/a | Republican | |
| 1858 | 46.40% | 53.60% | —N/a | —N/a | —N/a | —N/a | —N/a | —N/a | —N/a | —N/a | —N/a | —N/a | —N/a | —N/a | Republican | |
| 1857 | 44.94% | 55.06% | —N/a | —N/a | —N/a | —N/a | —N/a | —N/a | —N/a | —N/a | —N/a | —N/a | —N/a | —N/a | Republican | |
| 1856 | —N/a | —N/a | —N/a | —N/a | —N/a | —N/a | —N/a | —N/a | —N/a | —N/a | —N/a | —N/a | —N/a | —N/a | Pro-Nebraska Democrat | |
| 1855 | 47.13% | —N/a | —N/a | —N/a | 52.87% | —N/a | —N/a | —N/a | —N/a | —N/a | —N/a | —N/a | —N/a | —N/a | Know Nothing | |
| 1854 | 59.79% | —N/a | —N/a | —N/a | —N/a | —N/a | —N/a | —N/a | —N/a | —N/a | 40.21% | —N/a | —N/a | —N/a | Democratic | |
| 1853 | 77.10% | —N/a | —N/a | —N/a | —N/a | —N/a | —N/a | —N/a | —N/a | —N/a | —N/a | —N/a | —N/a | —N/a | Democratic | |
| 1852 | 39.04% | —N/a | —N/a | —N/a | —N/a | —N/a | —N/a | —N/a | —N/a | —N/a | 25.85% | —N/a | —N/a | —N/a | Democratic | |
| 1851 | 56.66%^{D} | —N/a | —N/a | —N/a | —N/a | —N/a | —N/a | —N/a | —N/a | —N/a | —N/a | —N/a | —N/a | —N/a | Democratic | |
| 1850 | 45.51% | —N/a | —N/a | —N/a | —N/a | —N/a | —N/a | —N/a | —N/a | —N/a | —N/a | —N/a | —N/a | —N/a | Democratic | |
| 1849 | —N/a | —N/a | —N/a | —N/a | —N/a | —N/a | —N/a | —N/a | —N/a | —N/a | —N/a | —N/a | —N/a | —N/a | Independent Democrat | |
| 1848 | 40.85% | —N/a | —N/a | —N/a | —N/a | —N/a | —N/a | —N/a | —N/a | —N/a | —N/a | —N/a | —N/a | —N/a | Independent Democrat | |
| 1847 | 46.77% | —N/a | 8.69% | 44.54% | —N/a | —N/a | —N/a | —N/a | —N/a | —N/a | —N/a | —N/a | —N/a | —N/a | Democratic | |
| 1846 | 33.35% | —N/a | 55.20% | 11.45% | —N/a | —N/a | —N/a | —N/a | —N/a | —N/a | —N/a | —N/a | —N/a | —N/a | Whig | |
| 1845 | 50.66% | —N/a | 43.15% | 6.19% | —N/a | —N/a | —N/a | —N/a | —N/a | —N/a | —N/a | —N/a | —N/a | —N/a | Democratic | |
| 1844 (Apr) | 41.88% | —N/a | —N/a | 7.60% | —N/a | —N/a | —N/a | —N/a | —N/a | —N/a | —N/a | —N/a | —N/a | —N/a | Independent Democrat | |
| 1844 (Mar)^{C} | 44.82% | —N/a | 44.43% | 10.75% | —N/a | —N/a | —N/a | —N/a | —N/a | —N/a | —N/a | —N/a | —N/a | —N/a | Democratic | |
| 1843 | 61.17% | —N/a | 34.73% | 4.10% | —N/a | —N/a | —N/a | —N/a | —N/a | —N/a | —N/a | —N/a | —N/a | —N/a | Democratic | |
| 1842 | 44.31% | —N/a | 50.26% | 5.43% | —N/a | —N/a | —N/a | —N/a | —N/a | —N/a | —N/a | —N/a | —N/a | —N/a | Whig | |
| 1841 | 52.33% | —N/a | 47.67% | —N/a | —N/a | —N/a | —N/a | —N/a | —N/a | —N/a | —N/a | —N/a | —N/a | —N/a | Democratic | |
| 1840 | 57.91% | —N/a | 42.09% | —N/a | —N/a | —N/a | —N/a | —N/a | —N/a | —N/a | —N/a | —N/a | —N/a | —N/a | Democratic | |
| 1839 | 37.52% | —N/a | 62.48% | —N/a | —N/a | —N/a | —N/a | —N/a | —N/a | —N/a | —N/a | —N/a | —N/a | —N/a | Whig | |
| 1838 | 45.76% | —N/a | 54.25% | —N/a | —N/a | —N/a | —N/a | —N/a | —N/a | —N/a | —N/a | —N/a | —N/a | —N/a | Whig | |
| 1837 | 66.86% | —N/a | 33.14% | —N/a | —N/a | —N/a | —N/a | —N/a | —N/a | —N/a | —N/a | —N/a | —N/a | —N/a | Democratic | |

== City Council-appointed mayors ==
A number of individuals have been elected by a vote aldermen to fill mayoral vacancies, either as acting or interim mayor.

=== Lester L. Bond (1873) ===
On August 18, 1873 Lester L. Bond was appointed as the first "acting mayor" in the city's history.

Incumbent mayor Joseph Medill, per city charter, informed the council that he planned to be absent from the city for an unspecified length of time "requiring the City Council to appoint an 'Acting Mayor' to serve during my absence"

The same day, the City Council held a narrow vote to appoint Bond, alderman from the Tenth Ward, to this post.

Bond was sworn in as Acting Mayor on August 22.

Medill ultimately did not return until after the remainder of his term had passed, leaving Bond to serve out the rest of his term.

=== George Bell Swift (1893) ===
On November 6, 1893 (less than two weeks after the assassination of Carter Harrison Sr.), George Bell Swift was voted by the City Council to serve as Mayor pro tempore (acting mayor) up until after a special election held the following month.

=== Frank Corr (1933) ===
On March 14, 1933, Frank J. Corr was elected mayor pro tempore by the city council following the assassination of Anton Cermak. Corr had been chosen by Chicago Democratic boss Patrick Nash, who believed Corr to be neither charismatic nor ambitious, and thus an ideal individual to reliably serve as a placeholder.

Corr was sworn in on March 16. He resigned on April 13 after serving for 29 days.

=== Edward J. Kelly (1933) ===
Edward J. Kelly was elected to replace Corr.

=== Michael Bilandic (1976) ===
Following the death in office of Richard J. Daley the city council voted on December 28, 1976, to appoint Michael Bilandic to serve as mayor up until a special election in 1977.

The election came after a brief power dispute. City Council President Pro-Tempure Wilson Frost had declared himself to be acting mayor following Daley's death (which would have made him the first African American to serve as the city's mayor). However, City Corporation Counsel William R. Quinlan disputed this, ruling that, since the city did not have a statute specifically outlining succession, the city council would need to elect the interim mayor.

The result of the City Council vote, effectively a yay or nay vote on appointing Bilandic, was as follows:

In support of Bilandic: 45 (93.75%)
Rejecting Bilandic: 2 (4.17%)
Abstaining: 1 (2.08%)

=== Eugene Sawyer (1987) ===
On December 2, 1987, following the death in office of mayor Harold Washington, the Chicago City Council voted to appoint Eugene Sawyer to serve as mayor up until a special election in 1989. The vote was as follows:

Eugene Sawyer: 29 (59.18%)
Timothy C. Evans: 19 (38.78%)
No Preference: 1 (2.04%)

== Notes ==
A. Only listing candidates who received a vote share of at least 5%
B. April 1876 election was annulled by courts
C. March 1844 election was voided by the City Council
D. 1859 election featured two Democratic candidates. The listed vote share is that of the top-finisher of the two (Walter S. Gurnee)
E.Since the disputed April 1876 mayoral election itself was not included on the ballot/tickets, no candidates were on the ballot.
