= 1845 Chicago mayoral election =

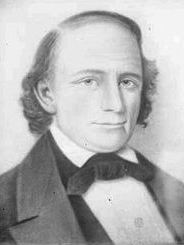

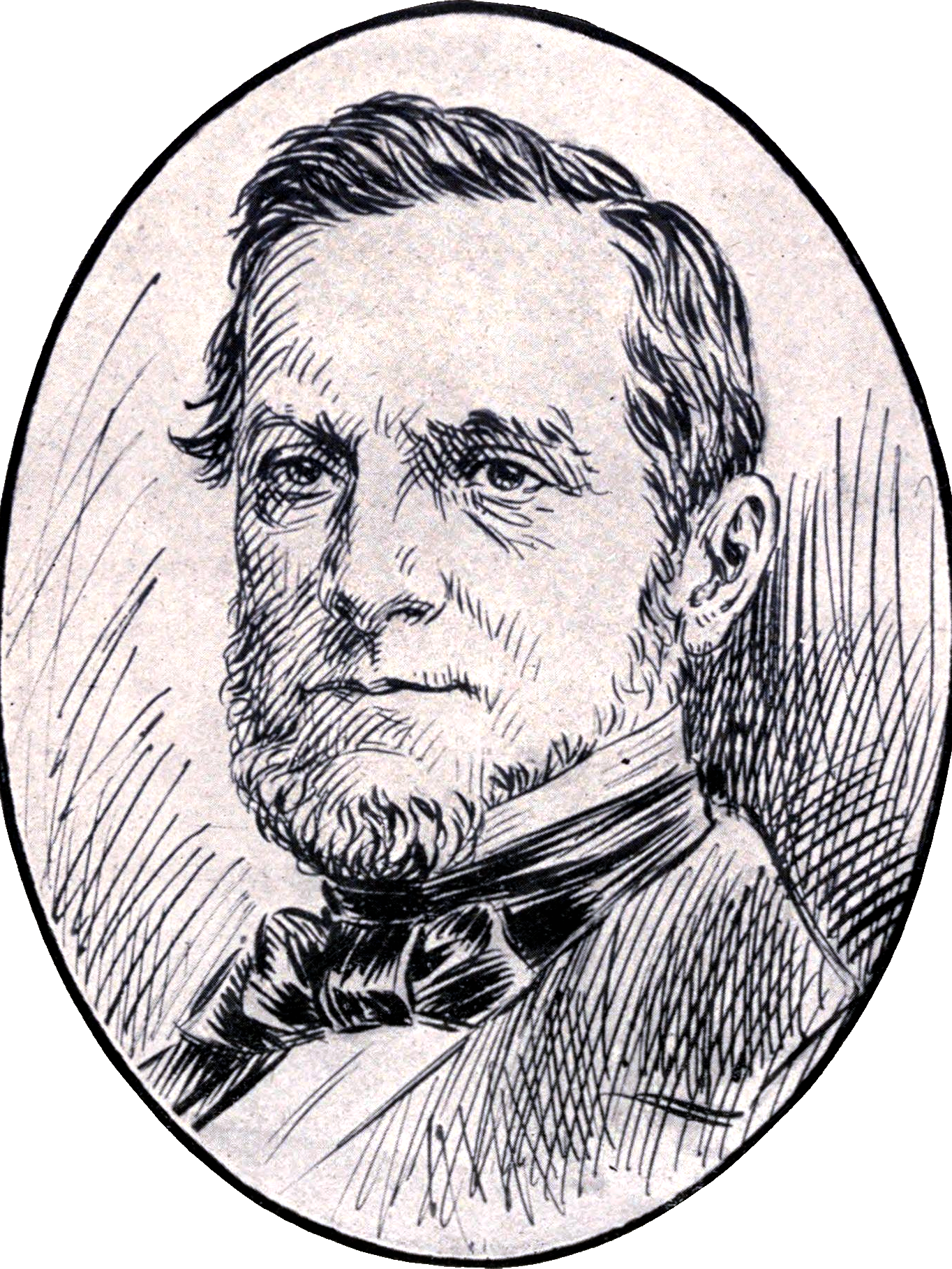

Nominee	Augustus Garrett	John H. Kinzie	Henry Smith
Party	Democratic	Whig	Liberty
Popular vote	1,072	913	131
Percentage	50.66%	43.15%	6.19%
Mayor before election
Augustus Garrett
Democratic
Elected mayor
Augustus Garrett
Democratic

In the Chicago mayoral election of 1845, Democratic nominee Augustus Garrett defeated Whig nominee John H. Kinzie and Liberty nominee Henry Smith by a 7.5% margin.

Garrett had previously served a term as mayor.

All candidates had previously run in Chicago mayoral elections, Garrett in 1842, 1843, and both 1844 elections; Smith in 1842, 1843 and both 1844 elections; Kinzie in 1837.

== Results ==
1845 Chicago mayoral election
Party	Candidate	Votes	%
Democratic	Augustus Garrett (incumbent)	1,072	50.66
Whig	John H. Kinzie	913	43.15
Liberty	Henry Smith	131	6.19
Turnout		2,116	
