= 1847 Chicago mayoral election =

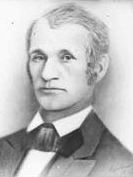

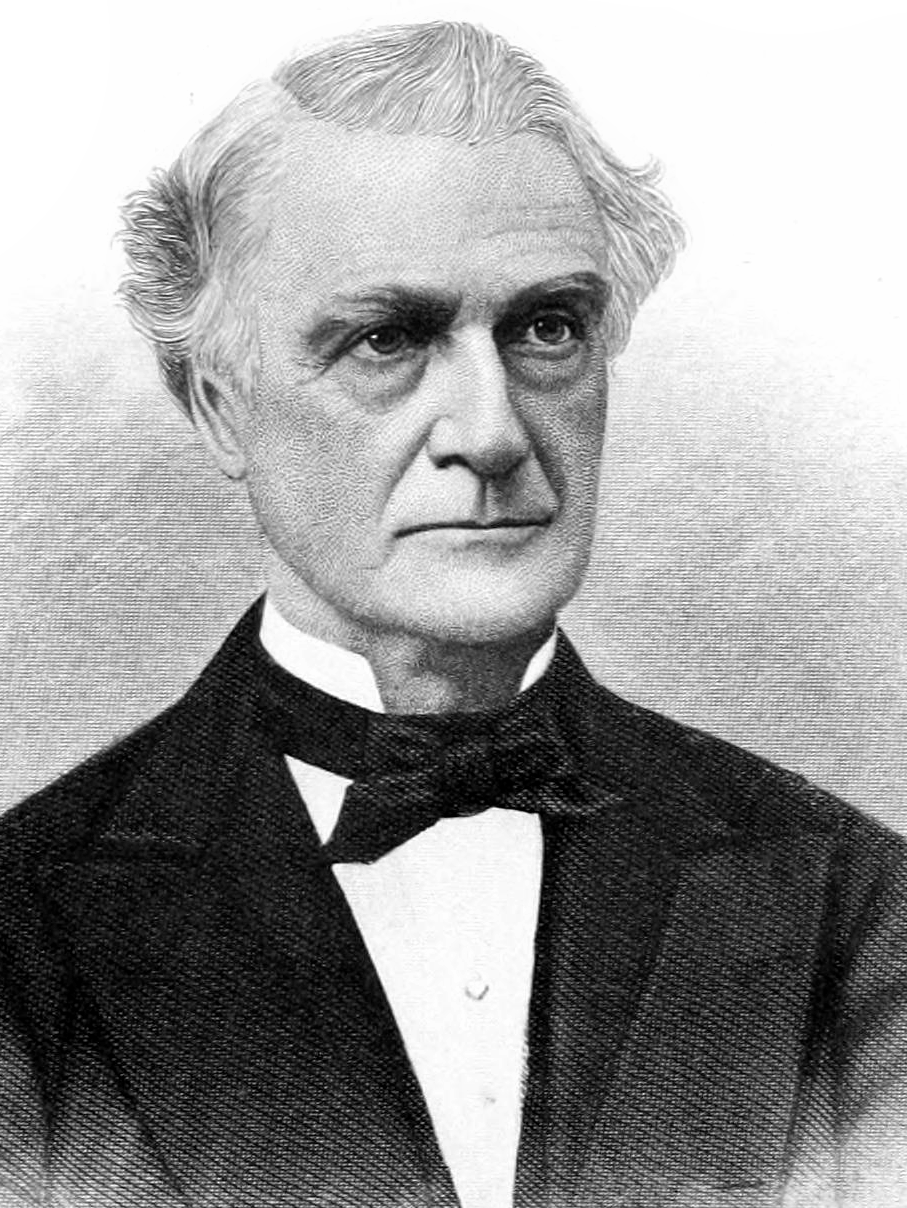

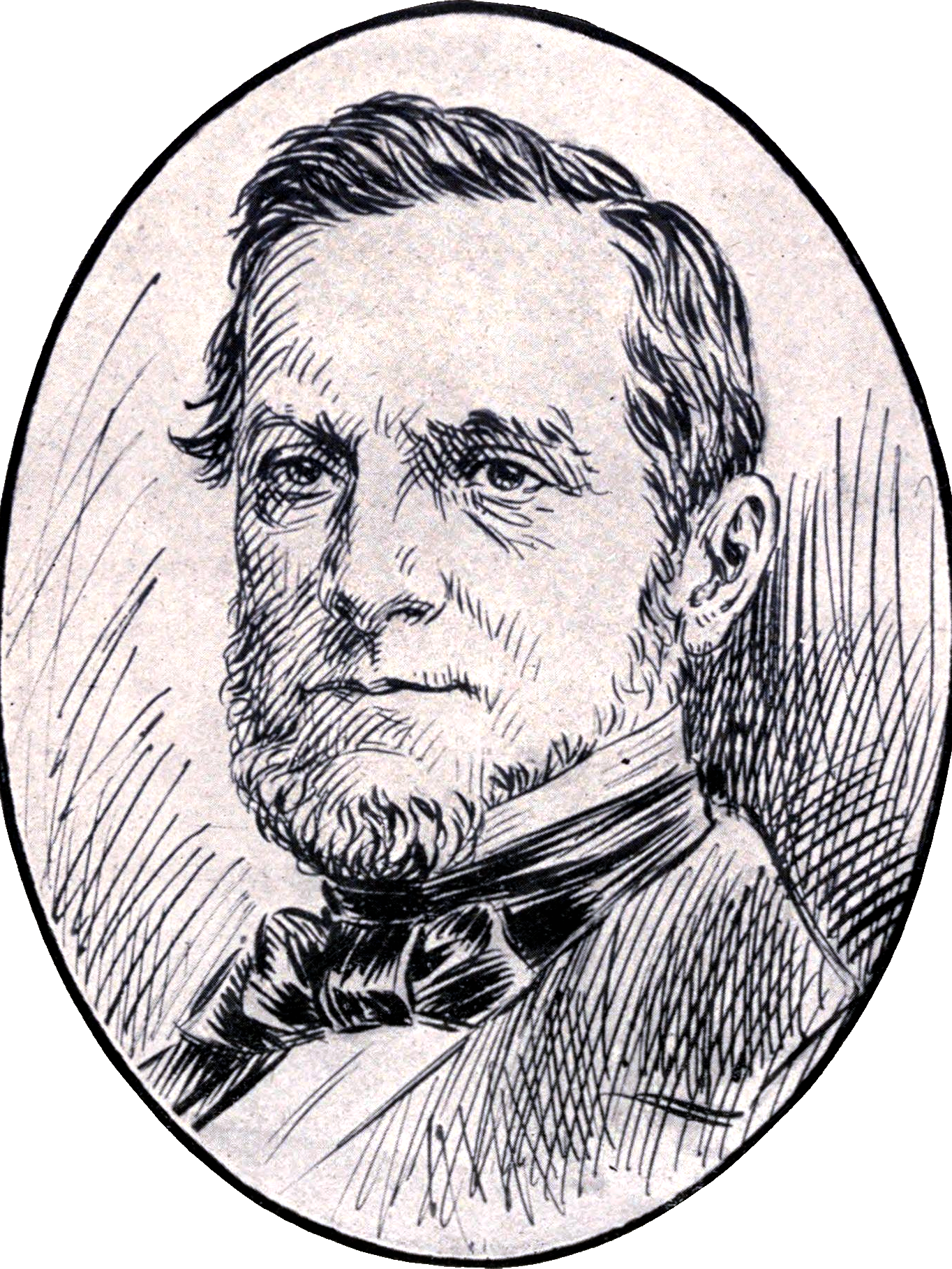
Nominee	James Curtiss	Philo Carpenter	John H. Kinzie
Party	Democratic	Liberty	Whig
Popular vote	1,281	1,220	238
Percentage	46.77%	44.54%	8.69%
Mayor before election
John Putnam Chapin
Whig
Elected mayor
James Curtiss
Democratic

In the Chicago mayoral election of 1847, Democratic nominee James Curtiss defeated Liberty nominee Philo Carpenter and Whig nominee John H. Kinzie.

Philo Carpenter had previously been an unsuccessful candidate in the prior election. John H. Kinzie had also previously been an unsuccessful candidate in the 1837 and 1845 mayoral elections.

== General election ==
1847 Chicago mayoral election
Party	Candidate	Votes	%
Democratic	James Curtiss	1,281	46.77
Liberty	Philo Carpenter	1,220	44.54
Whig	John H. Kinzie	238	8.69
Turnout		2,739	
