= 1846 Chicago mayoral election =

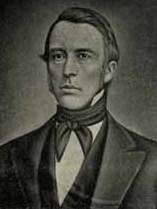

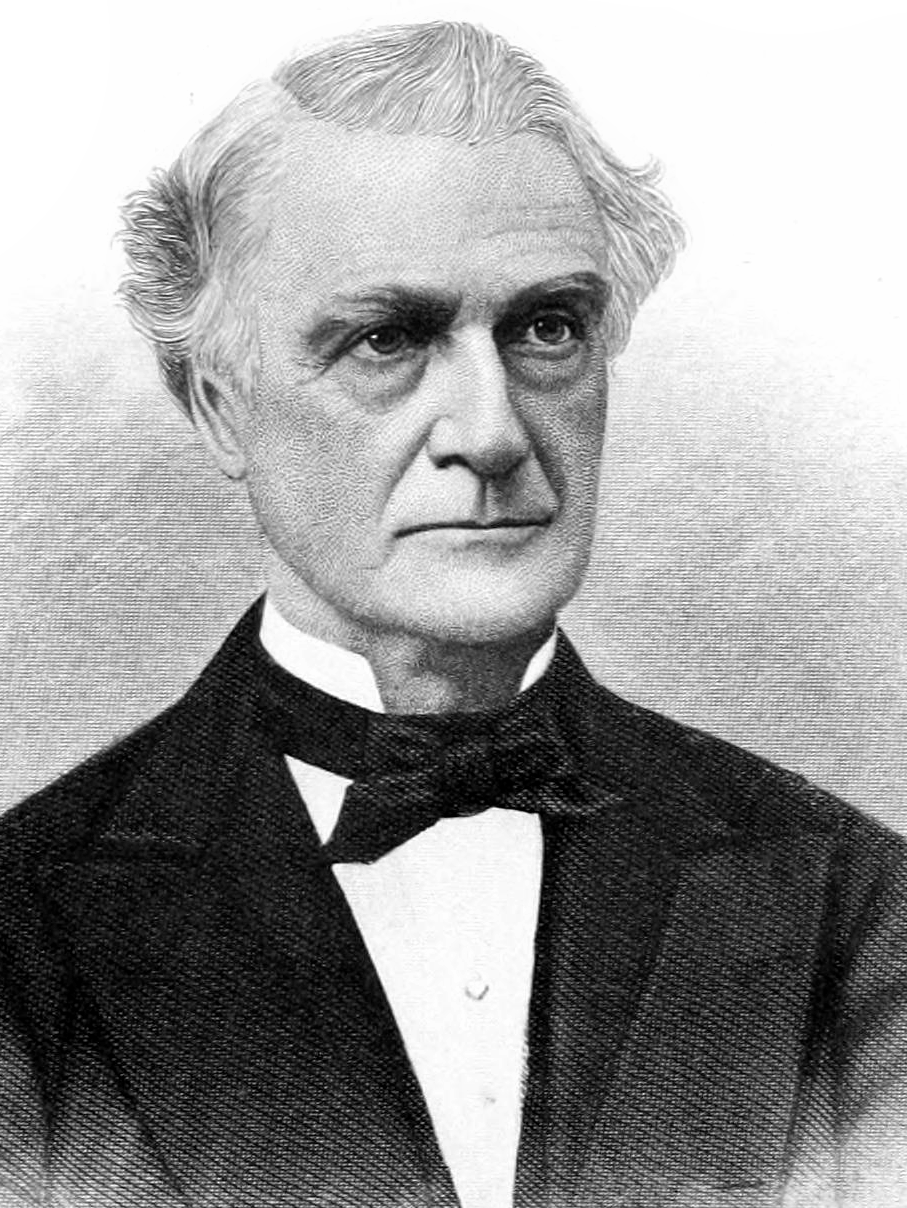
Nominee	John P. Chapin	Charles Follansbee	Philo Carpenter
Party	Whig	Democratic	Liberty
Popular vote	1,104	667	229
Percentage	55.20%	33.35%	11.45%
Mayor before election
Augustus Garrett
Democratic
Elected mayor
John Putnam Chapin
Whig

In the Chicago mayoral election of 1846, Whig nominee John P. Chapin defeated Democratic nominee Charles Follansbee and Liberty nominee Philo Carpenter by a landslide 22 point margin.

== Campaign ==
Follansbee, a former Chicago alderman from the 1st ward, failed to garner the support of Irish Democrats, an important constituency for the Democratic Party in Chicago. These voters rejected him because he was a champion of the "Native American Act", which would require a period of 21 years of residency before any immigrant could become a naturalized citizen.

Chapin was the first Whig since 1839 to hold the mayoral office. Prior to this he had had been elected as an alderman from the 1st ward in 1844.

== General election ==
1846 Chicago mayoral election
Party	Candidate	Votes	%
Whig	John P. Chapin	1,104	55.20
Democratic	Charles Follansbee	667	33.35
Liberty	Philo Carpenter	229	11.45
Turnout		2,000	
