= 1841 Chicago mayoral election =

Chicago mayoral election, 1841
← 1840	March 5, 1841	1842 →
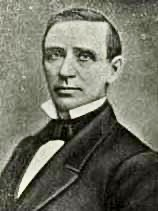

Candidate	Francis Cornwall Sherman	Isaac R. Gavin
Party	Democratic	Whig
Popular vote	460	419
Percentage	52.33%	47.67%
Mayor before election
Alexander Loyd
Democratic
Elected mayor
Francis Cornwall Sherman
Democratic

The 1841 Chicago mayoral election saw Democratic nominee Francis Cornwall Sherman defeat Whig nominee Isaac R. Gavin by a 4.7 point margin.

The election was held on March 5.

== Details ==
Prior elections had been conducted in a manner requiring voters to state their party preference upon entering their polling place. This election was conducted in a manner which provided voters more privacy/anonymity than the previous four mayoral elections had.

The Democratic Party nominated Francis Sherman, a former alderman and the proprietor of the Sherman House Hotel

== Results ==
1841 Chicago mayoral election
Party	Candidate	Votes	%
Democratic	Francis Cornwall Sherman	460	52.33
Whig	Isaac R. Gavin	419	47.67
Turnout		879	
