= 1849 Chicago mayoral election =

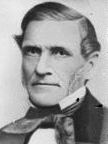

Nominee	James H. Woodworth	Timothy Wait	Lewis C. Kerchival
Party	Independent Democrat	Others	Others
Popular vote	2,668	399	245
Percentage	80.02%	11.97%	7.35%
Mayor before election
James H. Woodworth
Independent Democrat
Elected mayor
James H. Woodworth
Independent Democrat

In the Chicago mayoral election of 1849, incumbent James H. Woodworth was reelected in a landslide.

This election made Woodworth the first Chicago mayor to be reelected to a second consecutive term (an accolade that would have belonged to Augustus Garrett had the results of the March 1844 Chicago mayoral election not been declared null). Woodworth was also only the third mayor to be elected to a second term, after only Benjamin Wright Raymond and Augustus Garrett.

== Campaign ==
The election is notable for the lack of political party involvement. With the major national political parties disintegrating over the national debate surrounding slavery, the 1849 mayoral campaign lacked party conventions to nominate candidates. Instead, candidates were self-nominated. There was also a lack of party-organized efforts to support any candidate.

== Results ==
With 80.02% of the vote, Hutchinson received the highest vote share than any Chicago mayoral candidate had ever received (surpassing the 66.86% that William B. Ogden had received in 1937). This has only once been exceeded in Chicago mayoral elections, (by Jane Byrne who received 82.05% in 1979).

1849 Chicago mayoral election
Party	Candidate	Votes	%
Independent Democrat	James H. Woodworth (incumbent)	2,668	80.02
Other	Timothy Wait	399	11.97
Other	Lewis C. Kerchival	245	7.35
Other	S. D. Childs	22	0.66
Turnout		3,334	
