= 1842 Chicago mayoral election =

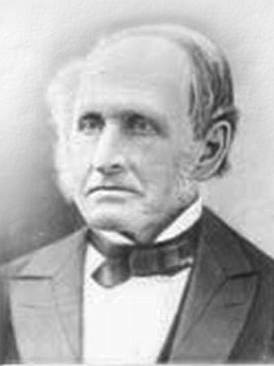

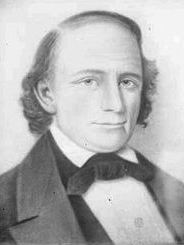

Nominee	Benjamin W. Raymond	Augustus Garrett	Henry Smith
Party	Whig	Democratic	Liberty
Popular vote	490	432	53
Percentage	50.26%	44.31%	5.43%
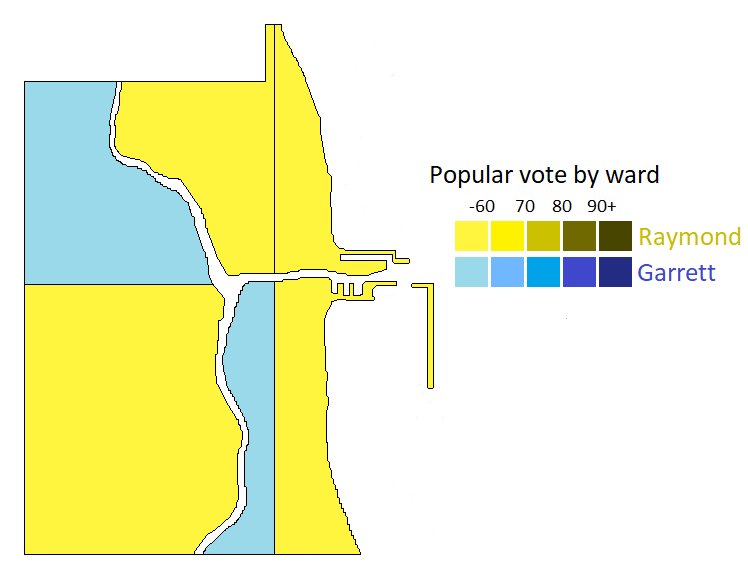
- Results by ward
Mayor before election
Buckner Stith Morris
Whig
Elected mayor
Benjamin W. Raymond
Whig

In the 1842 Chicago Mayoral election saw Whig candidate and Former Mayor Benjamin Wright Raymond defeat Democratic candidate Augustus Garrett and Liberty candidate Henry Smith by a six-point margin.

Raymond had previously served a term as mayor after winning the 1839 Chicago mayoral election, and had also previously unsuccessfully sought a second term in the 1840 Chicago mayoral election. By winning the 1842 election, Raymond became the first individual to serve more than one term as mayor of Chicago.

This was the first Chicago mayoral election in which voters were not required to be freeholders.

== Results ==
1842 Chicago mayoral election
Party	Candidate	Votes	%
Whig	Benjamin Wright Raymond	490	50.26
Democratic	Augustus Garrett	432	44.31
Liberty	Henry Smith	53	5.43
Turnout		975	

=== Results by ward ===
As with other mayoral elections of the era, returns in the city's wards heavily matched the partisan makeup of the votes that had been cast in the city's aldermanic election.

Ward	Raymond		Garrett		Smith		Total Votes
Ward	Votes	%	Votes	%	Votes	%	Total Votes
1st	162	58.1%	96	34.4%	21	7.5%	279
2nd	110	36.8%	168	56.2%	21	7.02%	299
3rd	26	57.8%	18	40.0%	1	2.2%	45
4th	13	44.8%	16	55.2%	0	0.0%	29
5th	52	59.8	35	40.2%	0	0.0%	87
6th	127	53.8%	99	41.9%	10	4.2%	236
