= 1967 Chicago mayoral election =

- April 4, 1967
- Turnout: 64.8% ▼4.8 pp
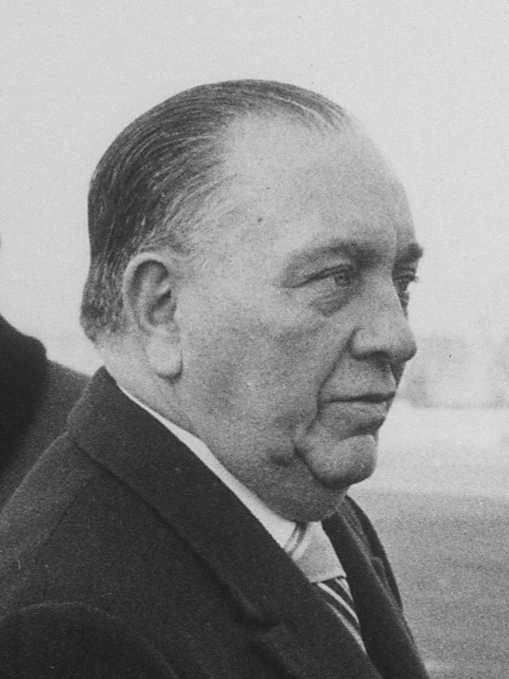

Nominee	Richard J. Daley	John L. Waner
Party	Democratic	Republican
Popular vote	792,238	272,542
Percentage	73.04%	25.13%
Mayor before election
Richard J. Daley
Democratic
Elected Mayor
Richard J. Daley
Democratic

The Chicago mayoral election of 1967 was held on April 4, 1967. The election saw Richard J. Daley being elected to a fourth term as mayor. Daley's main opponent was Republican nominee John L. Waner, who he defeated by a landslide 48% margin.

The election was preceded by primary elections held on February 28, 1967 to determine the nominees of both the Democratic Party and Republican Party.

== Background ==
After, in the previous election, having been routed by his Republican opponent among the white electorate, and only winning reelection due to his overwhelming support by black voters, Daley had adopted more conservative stances on race and other issues. Among his efforts to appeal to the "white backlash" voters that had abandoned him in 1963, he came out more strongly in opposition to "open housing" and equal rights for blacks. Daley sent messages to white voters that he was going to protect them against the encroachment of African Americans into their neighborhoods.

Ahead of his reelection campaign, Daley unveiled the city's first comprehensive plan since the 1909 Burnham Plan of Chicago. The plan called for 1,850 acres of slum clearance, 35,000 new units of public housing, adding fifty more acres to the campus of the University of Illinois at Chicago, and constructing the (controversial) Crosstown Expressway. It also called for the creation of sixteen distinct development plans for neighborhoods across Chicago, two of which had been drafted by the time the comprehensive plan was unveiled. The plan made clear Daley's intentions to protect white voters from the encroachment of African Americans. The plan stated that the city wanted a "diverse harmonious population" but also outlined that it wanted to take steps necessary to, "reduce future losses of white families." The plan additionally talked about "blight" removal from the central area and moving in more affluent families.

== Nominations ==
46.50% of registered voters participated in the primary elections.

=== Democratic primary ===
To project strength, on January 4, when Daley formerly filed his candidacy, he submitted nominating petitions extremely exceeding the requisite signature requirement, with 500,000 signatures. In contrast, the Republican Party's slated candidate John L. Waner had only 11,000 signatures on his petitions. Daley won the Democratic nomination, receiving 420,000 votes.

=== Republican primary ===
Originally, 1963 nominee Benjamin S. Adamowski expressed interest in running as the Republican Party's mayoral nominee again, but he ran into widespread opposition from Republican leaders, including from Cook County Board of Commissioners president Richard Ogilvie. Seeking to replicate the 1965 Republican victory of John Lindsay in New York City, Chicago's Republican Party sought to find a candidate of a similar mold. They were unable to do so. After a charismatic and young bank executive declined the nomination, they turned to 23rd Ward Republican Committeeman John L. Waner, who was a wealthy air conditioning contractor. Waner agreed to run. Waner had little overlap with Lindsay. For instance, while Lindsay was a WASP, while Waner (born Jan Ludwig Wojanarski) was the son of Polish immigrants. However, Republicans believed that Waner was a fresh-face who might be able to appeal to the city's large Polish electorate, and who was wealthy enough to be able to contribute finances towards his campaign. Waner won the Republican primary. He defeated perennial candidates Howard J. Doyle and Lawrence "Lar" Daly.

Chicago Republican mayoral primary (February 28, 1967)
Party	Candidate	Votes	%
Republican	John L. Waner	145,122	82.46
Republican	Howard J. Doyle	10,504	5.97
Republican	Lawrence "Lar" Daly	5,722	3.25
Republican	Write-in	14,644	8.32
Turnout		175,992	

=== Independent candidates ===
Civil-rights activist Dick Gregory ran as a write-in candidate. Goldwater Republican Lawrence "Lar" Daly also ran as a write-in after losing the Republican primary.

== General election ==
=== Campaign ===
Daley attempted to appeal to both white and black voters on the issue of civil rights, leading to him often speaking empty platitudes when addressing the topic. An issue Waner hoped to use against Daley was the fire that destroyed the McCormick Convention Center, built just a few years earlier at the cost of $35 million. However, the fact that the Chicago Tribune had campaigned vigorously for its construction earlier and was a prominent force in the Illinois Republican Party, prevented Waner from monopolising off of the incident. Additionally, Daley was quick to announce that a new McCormick Place, to be twice as large as the one that was lost, would be constructed. While campaigning, Daley pushed forward new infrastructure projects. Daley proposed the construction of fifteen miles of transit lines along the Kennedy Expressway and the Dan Ryan Expressway, which was immediately approved by the Chicago Plan Commission (this would ultimately materialize as the Chicago Transit Authority rapid transit route opened in 1970 along the Kennedy Expressway containing the five stations from the Logan Square station to the Jefferson Park Transit Center). Daley also announced several federal grant funds the city had received during the campaign. Downtown business leaders supported Daley, with some even forming the Non-partisan Committee to Re-Elect Mayor Daley to support his candidacy.

Despite urging from some supporters for him to seek the white backlash voters, Waner instead ran a campaign that took a stronger stance in support of civil rights than Daley's did. Wanter criticized Daley as, "more interested in maintaining plantation politics in public housing" than solving the ills of those who lived in public housing. However, Waner did not support "open housing", which would have strongly alienated his Republican base. He argued that jobs and urban renewal projects were of greater concern to blacks than "open housing". Waner commented on urban renewal, "Since 960 the city has displaced over 50,000 people, and after new buildings went up, no one could afford to move back into the new neighborhood. There was no attempt made to provide decent low-cost homes for rent or for purchase". Waner argued that Democrats liked to trap blacks in public housing, "because it enables the Democratic precinct captain to corral votes for the machine". When speaking in Chicago on March 24 at an anti-Vietnam War rally, King criticized what he saw as Chicago's, "failure to live up to last summer's open-housing agreement". King remarked that it might be necessary to hold even larger open-housing rallies in the summer of 1967. Daley hit back, accusing King of making "political" statements aimed at harming his reelection prospects, and pledged that he would not allow civil rights marchers to disrupt the city. This was seen to appeal to the white backlash voters. Polls showed that Daley had improved his support in the city's white working-class Bungalow Belt over his support there four years earlier.

=== Results ===
Daley won a landslide victory, carrying all fifty of the city's wards. The 792,238 votes he received was more than he had received in any of his previous three mayoral races. Dick Gregory received a record-breaking number of write-in votes for a candidate in a Chicago mayoral election. Daley carried all 50 wards; Waner failed to carry his home ward, of which he had been the longtime Republican committeeman.

Mayor of Chicago 1967 election (General Election)
Party	Candidate	Votes	%
Democratic	Richard J. Daley (incumbent)	792,238	73.04
Republican	John L. Waner	272,542	25.13
Independent	Richard C. "Dick" Gregory (write-in)	19,480	1.80
Independent	Lawrence "Lar" Daly (write-in)	467	0.04
Turnout		1,084,727	

== Aftermath ==
Daley felt sorry for Waner after the election, being the only one to call him the day after the election and calling to say that he had run a good campaign.

== Bibliography ==
- Royko, Mike (1971). Boss: Richard J. Daley of Chicago. New York, New York: E.P. Dutton & Co., Inc. ISBN 0-525-07000-1.
