= 1971 Chicago mayoral election =

- April 6, 1971
- Turnout: 68.9% ▲4.1 pp
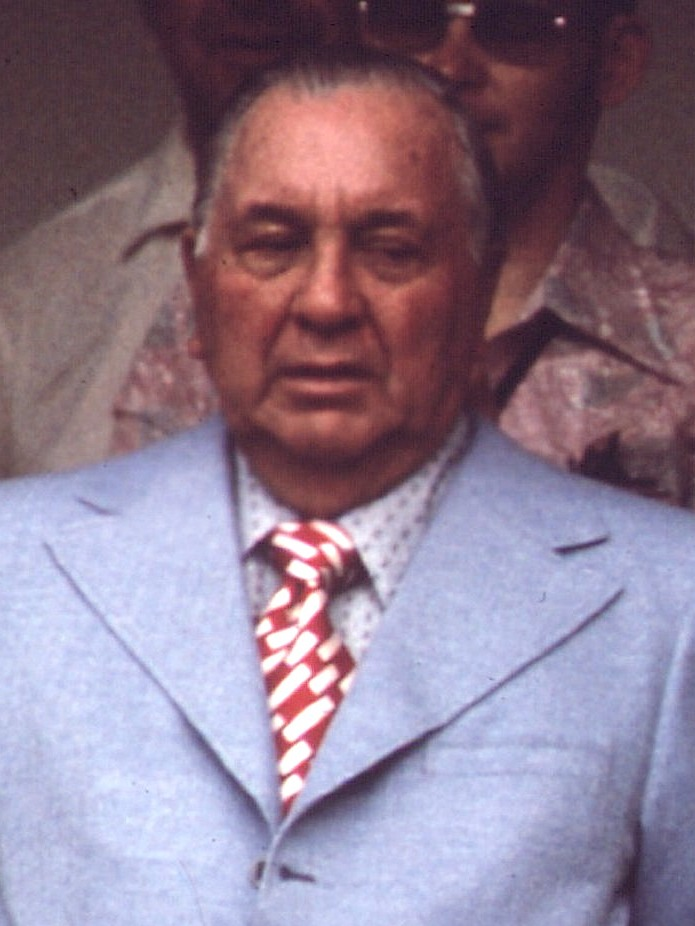

Nominee	Richard J. Daley	Richard Friedman
Party	Democratic	Republican
Popular vote	740,137	315,969
Percentage	70.08%	29.92%
Mayor before election
Richard J. Daley
Democratic
Elected Mayor
Richard J. Daley
Democratic

The Chicago mayoral election of 1971, held on April 6, 1971, was a contest between incumbent Democrat Richard J. Daley and Republican Richard E. Friedman. Daley won by a landslide 40% margin, and it was his fifth consecutive mayoral win, the longest serving mayor of Chicago until that time.

== Background ==
This was the final Chicago mayoral election held before the ratification of the Twenty-sixth Amendment to the United States Constitution, which lowered the voting age from 21 to 18.

== Nominations ==
On their party's primary ballots on February 23, 1971, both candidates ran unopposed. 45.72% of registered voters participated in the city's municipal primary elections.

=== Democratic primary ===
In December 1970, Daley, then 68 years old, announced he would seek a fifth term after much speculation by the public. In a press conference announcing his reelection campaign, Daley remarked: "This election won't be won by speeches. It will have to be won by hard, hard work." He won the Democratic primary on February 23, 1971, with about 375,000 votes, his lowest tally since 1959, but a figure nine times that of Friedman's primary tally.

=== Republican primary ===
Richard Friedman, a 41-year-old independent Democrat running as a Republican, was an attorney and former executive director of the watchdog organization Better Government Association. Friedman was endorsed by the Rev. Jesse Jackson.

== General election and results ==
Daley was "lavishly endorsed" by many of the city's businessmen and civic leaders, including many who usually contribute to and vote for Republicans. The Republican Party had hoped that Friedman as a reformist would be able to build a coalition of Republicans and independents to mount a strong challenge to Daley, but he was nevertheless the "decided underdog". Chicago had not elected a Republican as mayor since William Hale Thompson won in 1927, before Friedman was born.

In the days ahead of voting on April 6, The New York Times described Chicago's public health facilities as "among the worst in the nation", with the infant mortality rate among the highest. In a sign of accelerating "white flight" to the suburbs, the city's white population had decreased by up to 50,000 each year prior. Daley's critics pointed to low-income housing policies that confined Black Chicagoans in two underserved, poor areas, and Friedman focused his campaign attack on Daley's low-income housing policy. One in eight city residents was on welfare at the time. But, as The New York Times noted, "unless a voter is black, poor, rebellious, or involved in some contretemps with a Democratic precinct leader, his dissatisfaction with Mr. Daley is likely to be minute."

Daley's 740,137 votes more than doubled his opponent's 318,059, and Daley won in all but two of the city's 50 wards. Friedman carried the wards of Hyde Park and Armitage Street. The total votes were some 11,000 fewer than the previous mayoral race.

Mayor of Chicago 1971 election (General election)
Party	Candidate	Votes	%
Democratic	Richard J. Daley (incumbent)	740,137	70.08
Republican	Richard E. Friedman	315,969	29.92
Turnout		1,056,106	
