= 1840 Chicago mayoral election =

Chicago mayoral election, 1840
← 1839	March 3, 1840	1841 →
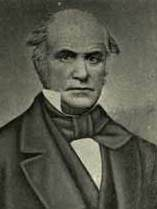

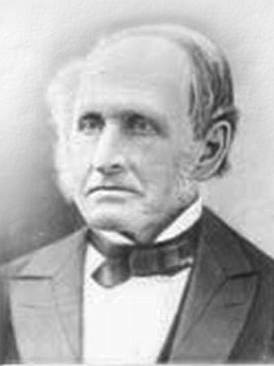
Candidate	Alexander Loyd	Benjamin Wright Raymond
Party	Democratic	Whig
Popular vote	582	423
Percentage	57.91%	42.09%
Mayor before election
Benjamin Wright Raymond
Whig
Elected mayor
Alexander Loyd
Democratic

The 1840 Chicago mayoral election saw Democratic nominee Alexander Loyd defeat incumbent Whig Benjamin Wright Raymond by a landslide 15.8 point margin.

With a narrative that local elections such as Chicago's would be a bellwether of the coming 1840 United States presidential election, both parties locally viewed the election as being of great importance. Chicago's mayoral result, ultimately, was no bellwether of the presidential election's party outcome.

The election was held on March 3.

== Results ==
1840 Chicago mayoral election
Party	Candidate	Votes	%
Democratic	Alexander Loyd	582	57.91
Whig	Benjamin Wright Raymond (incumbent)	423	42.09
Turnout		1,005	
