= City Council elections in Chicago =

The City of Chicago has held elections to its City Council since its incorporation in 1837. Elections were held annually from 1837 through 1921, biennially from 1923 through 1933, and quadrennially starting in 1935. From 1851 through 1922 the Council was staggered and half of it was chosen at each election, but before 1851 and since 1923 the entire Council has been elected at each election.

Members of the Council are known as alderpersons, (some prefer the terms alderman, alderwoman, or alder) and are elected from districts known as wards. Since 1923 there have been fifty wards, each entitled to one alderperson. Prior to that time the number of wards varied but they were almost always entitled to two alderpersons each. The Council was known as the "Common Council" prior to 1875.

== History ==
When Chicago was incorporated as a town in 1833, it was governed by a board of trustees that were elected at large and who elected a President from among themselves. Chicago's incorporation as a city in 1837 abandoned such a model in favor of a Common Council elected from wards and a separate mayor elected at large. However, the mayor would serve as the presiding officer of the Common Council. Each ward was nominally entitled to two alderpersons each; however, prior to 1839 the 3rd and 5th wards were only entitled to one alderperson each. Alderperson terms were one year each, and both alderpersons were elected simultaneously in a ward. After 1850 alderperson terms were extended to two years but the council was then staggered so that elections continued to be held annually and only one alderperson was elected from a ward each election.

The City Charter was abolished in favor of the Cities and Villages Act of 1872, which renamed the council the "City Council".

In 1920 elections were made officially nonpartisan. In 1923 the number of alderpersons per ward was decreased to one and the number of wards was increased to fifty, while the entire council was once again elected at each election. Starting in 1935 the term for alderpersons was extended to four years, and city council elections since that time have coincided with the mayoral election.

In 1837 there were six wards, before that number was increased to nine in 1847, ten in 1853, sixteen in 1863, twenty in 1869, down to eighteen in 1876, to twenty-four in 1887 and thirty-four in 1890, to thirty-five in 1900, before being increased to fifty in 1923.

== Current election laws ==
There are no term limits for alderpersons.
