= 1999 Chicago mayoral election =

- February 23, 1999
- Turnout: 41.9% ▼0.35 pp
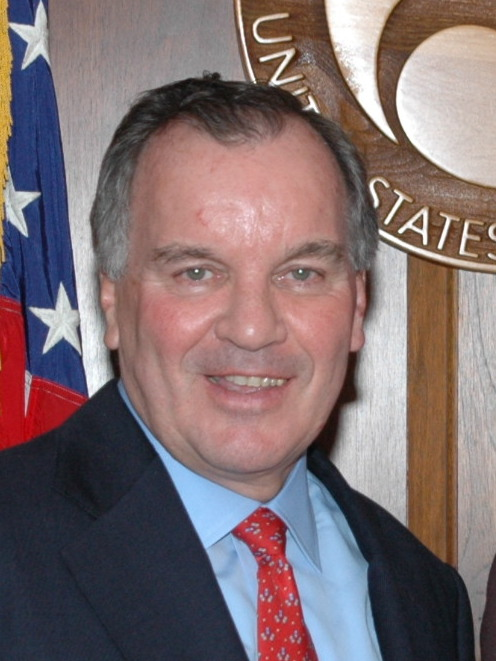

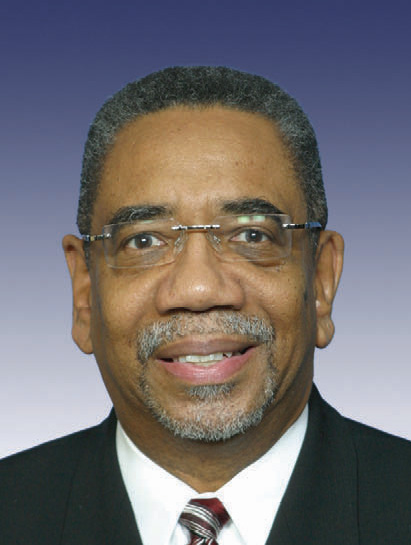
Candidate	Richard M. Daley	Bobby Rush
Popular vote	429,746	167,845
Percentage	71.91%	28.09%
- Ward results
Mayor before election
Richard M. Daley
Elected Mayor
Richard M. Daley

The Chicago mayoral election of 1999, which took place on February 23, 1999, resulted in the re-election of incumbent Richard M. Daley over Bobby Rush, with 428,872 votes to Rush's 167,709. Daley garnered a landslide 71.9% of the total vote, winning by a 44-point margin. This was the first officially nonpartisan Chicago mayoral election, per a 1995 Illinois law.

== Candidates ==
- Richard M. Daley, incumbent mayor since 1989
- Bobby Rush, U.S. congressman from Illinois's 1st congressional district (since 1993) and former member of the Chicago City Council from the 2nd ward (1983–1993)

Disqualified

- Joe Banks Jr.

== Campaign ==
Daley was considered a broad front-runner from the start. Nevertheless, to dedicated significant funding and manpower to his campaign, and also gave support to several aldermanic campaigns.

Joe Banks Jr. was denied inclusion on the ballot due to issues regarding the filing of his nomination papers. This left Rush as Daley's sole opponent. Rush was a well-known figure in the city. A congressman, Rush had first made his name in Chicago in the 1960s as a local Black Panther leader, and had received further notability thereafter as a member of the Chicago City Council.

The Chicago Tribune wrote of Daley's campaign,

Daley reaped the benefits of a strong economy and used his powerful political organization to convince voters that Chicago was moving in the right direction and that Rush could not do a better job.

The Chicago Tribune also observed,

Though Daley’s victory was generated by a potent organization able to deliver votes for the mayor, it also was helped along by the disorganization and missed opportunities that plagued Rush’s campaign.

Daley adopted a tactic of ignoring Rush, refraining from saying his opponent's name during campaign speeches. As was the case in all of his reelection campaigns, Daley did not attend any debates. He believed that a debate would only gift Rush free publicity.

Rush's campaign lacked funding. His campaign's theme was addressing an issue of there being a divide that had created "two Chicagos (similar rhetoric to the notion of a divide creating "Two Americas"). Rush argued that poor neighborhoods had been neglected by Daley, while Daley instead focused on downtown projects such as adding flowerpots to beautify downtown streets and the construction of a ferris wheel at Navy Pier.

== Results ==
Daley won a landslide re-election to an additional term, which (so long as he completed the full term) would make him the second-longest-serving mayor in the city's history behind only his own father (Richard J. Daley), and surpassing Edward Joseph Kelly.

=== Citywide result ===
The Chicago Tribune considered Daley's win a significant landslide victory, writing,

Daley swept to a fourth term as Chicago’s mayor Tuesday, earning an overwhelming victory over U.S. Rep. Bobby Rush that extended and solidified his grasp over the city in a manner not seen since the days of his father, the late Richard J. Daley.

Daley received his highest-yet percentage of the vote, slightly surpassing the share he received in 1991. However it was not an all-time record, as several earlier mayors had received higher vote-shares.

Mayor of Chicago 1999
Party	Candidate	Votes	%
Nonpartisan	Richard M. Daley (incumbent)	429,746	71.91
Nonpartisan	Bobby L. Rush	167,845	28.09
Turnout		597,591	

=== Results by ward ===
Daley won a majority of the vote in 33 of the city's 50 wards. Rush won a majority of the vote in the remaining 17 wards.

The Chicago Tribune observed that Daley had,

Received support far beyond the traditional Democratic ward organizations on the Southwest and Northwest Sides, picking up significant vote totals in predominantly African-American wards. The support for the mayor in the city’s black wards, which Rush had considered to be his base constituency, reflected the alliances Daley has forged among religious and political leaders in the African-American community.

This was the last of Daley's campaigns in which he did not carry a plurality of the vote in all 50 wards (as he would do in the next two mayoral elections).

Results by ward

Ward	Richard M. Daley		Bobby L. Rush		Total
Ward	Votes	%	Votes	%	Votes
1	6,622	81.7%	1,482	18.3%	8,104
2	5,856	51.1%	5,595	48.9%	11,451
3	3,186	36.8%	5,480	63.2%	8,666
4	5,527	45.0%	6,754	55.0%	12,281
5	5,737	46.6%	6,580	53.4%	12,317
6	6,530	41.1%	9,372	58.9%	15,902
7	5,280	43.6%	6,840	56.4%	12,120
8	7,706	44.2%	9,728	55.8%	17,434
9	4,925	38.5%	7,869	61.5%	12,794
10	11,969	87.8%	1,664	12.2%	13,633
11	14,502	96.1%	582	3.9%	15,084
12	4,639	91.7%	420	8.3%	5,059
13	19,512	96.8%	642	3.2%	20,154
14	9,789	94.7%	552	5.3%	10,341
15	4,464	44.0%	5,671	56.0%	10,135
16	3,123	43.0%	4,132	57.0%	7,255
17	4,547	41.2%	6,480	58.8%	11,027
18	9,505	55.1%	7,731	44.9%	17,236
19	18,322	87.0%	2,744	13.0%	21,066
20	3,910	38.8%	6,157	61.2%	10,067
21	6,712	40.0%	10,088	60.0%	16,800
22	4,851	74.6%	1,650	25.4%	6,501
23	18,123	96.0%	752	4.0%	18,875
24	3,956	41.7%	5,539	58.3%	9,495
25	5,978	88.4%	788	11.6%	6,766
26	6,744	84.8%	1,212	15.2%	7,956
27	6,301	57.5%	4,659	42.5%	10,960
28	3,464	37.9%	5,678	62.1%	9,142
29	5,870	48.6%	6,213	51.4%	12,083
30	9,071	94.2%	557	5.8%	9,628
31	7,617	91.6%	696	8.4%	8,313
32	11,411	90.6%	1,178	9.4%	12,589
33	8,958	93.0%	676	7.0%	9,634
34	6,430	43.5%	8,365	56.5%	14,795
35	7,149	86.1%	1,157	13.9%	8,306
36	14,333	93.4%	1,016	6.6%	15,349
37	4,567	44.0%	5,813	56.0%	10,380
38	13,550	96.2%	532	3.8%	14,082
39	11,407	93.9%	744	6.1%	12,151
40	8,169	89.7%	940	10.3%	9,109
41	18,091	95.3%	892	4.7%	18,983
42	13,578	90.5%	1,421	9.5%	14,999
43	9,841	91.1%	962	8.9%	10,803
44	9,992	91.4%	939	8.6%	10,931
45	15,766	96.1%	645	3.9%	16,411
46	9,381	78.6%	2,550	21.4%	11,931
47	9,581	90.5%	1,007	9.5%	10,588
48	8,254	81.4%	1,887	18.6%	10,141
49	4,980	71.6%	1,974	28.4%	6,954
50	9,096	92.8%	704	7.2%	9,800
Total	428,872	71.9%	167,709	28.1%	596,581

=== Daley's victory speech ===
On the evening of the election, Daley delivered a brief victory speech in which he touted his victory as, "a tremendous vote of confidence...built with votes from all of Chicago's neighborhoods," remarking,

Today, people from every community said they want us to continue to work together as one city in which everyone has a voice and no one is left behind, and we will.

In his speech, Daley further remarked on his victory,

It was a vote of confidence in our future. And today, the people of Chicago said, "We want to continue to reform our public schools and work toward that day when every child graduates with a real diploma and real opportunities to live their dreams." And we will.

The speech was the first of his campaign in which he mentioned Rush by name. Daley promised to collaborate with Rush (who would continue to Represent portions of Chicago in the U.S. House of Representatives) and other elected officials, "for the betterment of our city and all our neighborhoods."

=== Rush's concession speech ===
On the evening of the election, Rush delivered a concession speech to a gathering of approximately 200 supporters at the HoneySuckle Chicago Restaurant. He declared that their campaign had "stood tall" in the face of a much better-funded opponent. While conceding the evident outcome of the election, Rush remarked,

It seems as though I have lost this election, but I want you to know I don’t consider myself a loser. This wasn’t the right time.

Rush expressed no regret in challenging Daley, opining that he believed that it would have been "disingenuous" to have allowed Daley to be re-elected uncontested because there was a need for Daley to face an opponent promoting a movement "fairness and justice" for the entirety of Chicago. Rush remarked,

That movement, although faint, is still alive, and it will continue to reinvent itself and grow and be the kind of movement that will help lead both Chicagos down the path toward equality and justice.
