= 1947 Chicago mayoral election =

- April 1, 1947
- Turnout: 70.31%
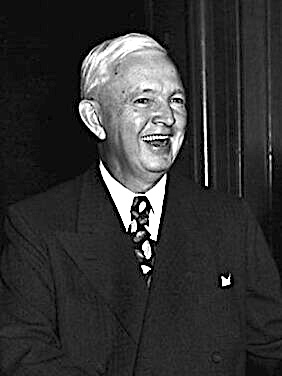

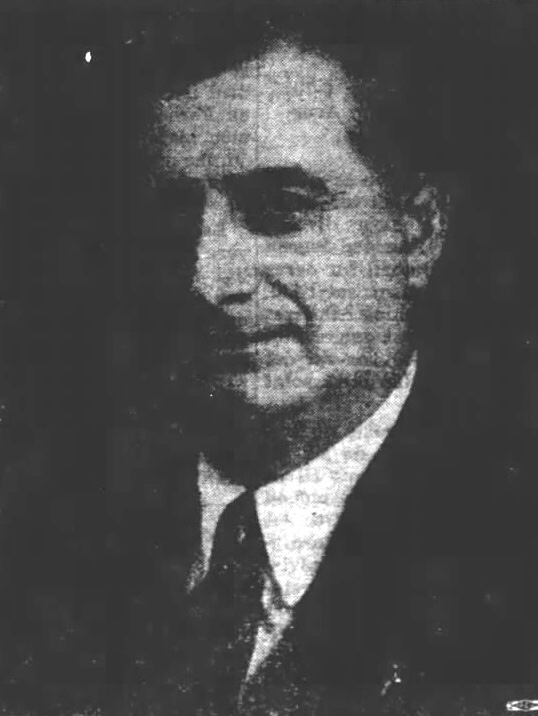
Nominee	Martin H. Kennelly	Russell Root
Party	Democratic	Republican
Popular vote	919,593	646,239
Percentage	58.73%	41.27%
Mayor before election
Edward J. Kelly
Democratic
Elected Mayor
Martin H. Kennelly
Democratic

The Chicago mayoral election of 1947 was held on April 1, 1947. The election saw Democrat Martin H. Kennelly being elected, defeating Republican Russell Root by a more-than 17% margin of victory.

The election was preceded by primary elections in February 1947 to determine the nominees of both the Democratic Party and the Republican Party.

== Nominations ==
=== Democratic primary ===
After fourteen scandal-filled years in office, incumbent Democrat Edward J. Kelly was seen by many as unelectable in the year 1947. The Cook County Democratic Party (led by Jacob Arvey) desired to run a candidate with reform bona-fides, wanting to avoid a candidates with allegations of mismanagement and corruption. Thus, they convinced Kelly not to seek reelection. This would be the last Chicago mayoral election until 2011 in which an incumbent did not seek reelection. It was also the first since 1923 in which this was the case.

The Democratic Party opted to back Kennelly, a wealthy warehouse magnate. Kennelly had no prior experience in political office. Kennelly was the third mayoral candidate to reside in Edgewater, following Nathaniel C. Sears and William Emmett Dever, and would consequentially be the second Edgewater resident elected mayor (after Dever).

=== Republican primary ===
The number of voters who participated in the Republican primary was roughly half the number of voters who participated in the Democratic primary participated. Republicans nominated Russell Root. Root, considered rather politically undistinguished, had been strongly backed by the statewide Republican organization of Governor Dwight H. Green.

== General election ==
Root, appealing to the onslaught of the second red scare, characterized the race as a "vote for or against Communism". Root attacked the nature Kennelly's nomination, having been selected by the Democratic machine. However, these charges were perhaps rendered less than effective by the nature of Root's own nomination, having been pushed by Green's Republican organization. Kennelly attempted to run on an image of having clean record. Much of the platform he extolled could be attributed to the Progressive Era values he had grown up around. Republicans accused Kennelly of having, in his career as a warehouse magnate, profiteered off of the city in public contracts he received to store polling place materials. Kennelly rebuked these allegations, arguing that he charged the city the same price in 1947 that he had when he began providing the city this service in 1923, and that he considered it more of a civic duty than a profit-making venture. Kennelly benefited from the strong inroads that Kelly had built with African Americans. The Chicago Defender endorsed Kennelly, arguing that the city's black population saw it as important to, "continue and expand the progressive and far-reaching racial policies" of Kelly.

=== Results ===
The election saw a record-breaking total, with more votes being cast than in any Chicago mayoral election before it. Kennelly won the greatest vote total of any mayoral candidate in Chicago history.

Mayor of Chicago 1947 election
Party	Candidate	Votes	%
Democratic	Martin H. Kennelly	919,593	58.73
Republican	Russell Root	646,239	41.27
Turnout		1,565,832	
