= 1843 Chicago mayoral election =

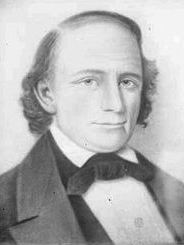

Nominee	Augustus Garrett	Thomas Church
Party	Democratic	Whig
Popular vote	671	381
Percentage	61.17%	34.73%
Mayor before election
Benjamin Wright Raymond
Whig
Elected mayor
Augustus Garrett
Democratic

In the 1843 Chicago mayoral election, Democratic nominee Augustus Garrett defeated Whig nominee Thomas Church and Liberty nominee Henry Smith by a landslide 26.5% margin.

Incumbent Whig Benjamin Wright Raymond did not run for reelection to a third term.

Democratic nominee Augustus Garrett had been an unsuccessful election in the preceding 1842 election. He was also a former city alderman.

Like Garrett, Liberty candidate Henry Smith had also been a candidate in the previous election.

As with other mayoral elections of the era, returns in the city's wards heavily matched the partisan makeup of the votes that had been cast in the city's aldermanic election.

== Results ==
1843 Chicago mayoral election
Party	Candidate	Votes	%
Democratic	Augustus Garrett	671	61.17
Whig	Thomas Church	381	34.73
Liberty	Henry Smith	45	4.10
Turnout		1,097	
