= Philo Carpenter =

American pharmacist

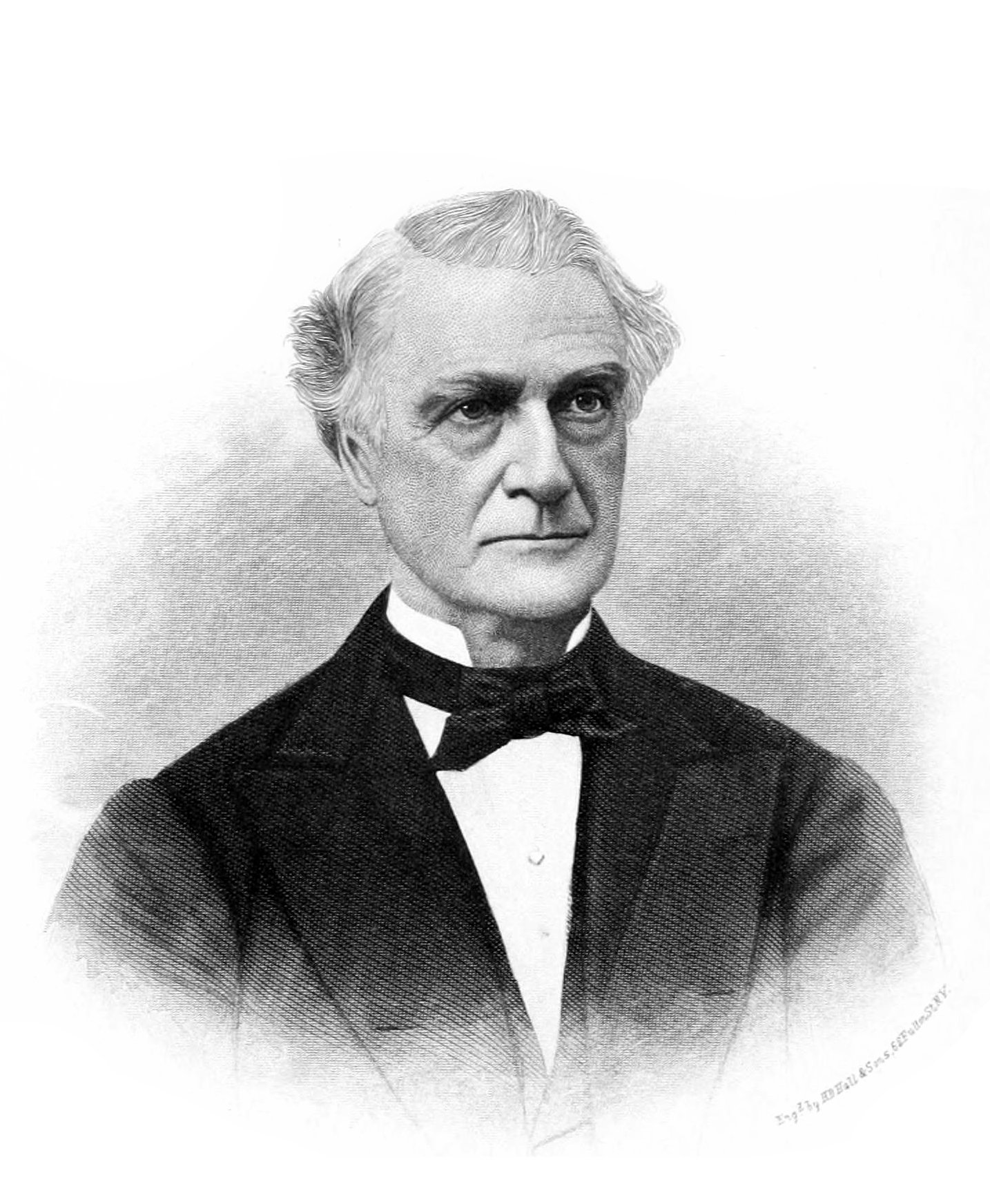
- Born: February 27, 1805; Savoy, Massachusetts
- Died: August 7, 1886 (aged 81); Chicago, Illinois
- Burial place: Graceland Cemetery
- Spouse: Ann Thompson
- Children: 7

Philo Carpenter (February 27, 1805 – August 7, 1886) was Chicago, Illinois' first pharmacist, and an outspoken abolitionist.

== Biography ==
Born in Savoy, Massachusetts, February 27, 1805, young Philo learned medicine and the pharmaceutical trade in Troy, New York in the drugstore of Amatus Robins. He eventually gained a half interest in the business. There he married Sarah Bridges in May 1830, but she died that November.

Joining the Presbyterian Church, in Troy, he gained an interest in missionary work. Business and religion shaped much of the rest of his life.

Hearing from his cousin of the opportunities for both business and proselytizing in the then frontier, in 1832, he sold his share of the drugstore. Shipping ahead a supply of drugs and medical equipment, he moved to Chicago, then an unincorporated village clustered around Fort Dearborn. Arriving during a cholera outbreak, he helped treat the victims.

He opened the settlement's first drug store in a log cabin on what is now Lake Street. He made enough money in two years to afford to return to the East and get remarried to Ann Thompson. They had seven children together.

Philo and Ann Carpenter's arrival in Chicago was a small turning point in the area's history, because they came into town in a fancy carriage. This was the first pleasure vehicle to arrive in Chicago, and the Carpenters' trip in such a carriage demonstrated that the area was safe from Indian attacks.

Carpenter invested heavily in real estate in the area surrounding what is now LaSalle Street and Wacker Drive, but the Panic of 1837 wiped him out, and his creditors took all of the land he had purchased. The area would be worth over $200 million today.

His pharmaceutical business soon allowed him to become financially solvent again. A religious man, he organized the Home Sunday School of the First Presbyterian Church. He was an elder in this church until the Civil War, when members of the congregation split over whether to support the North or the South.

He then organized a new church, the First Congregational, and became deacon. Carpenter also was a member of the Chicago Theological Seminary, and was managing director of the Chicago Bible Society.

In 1838, Carpenter helped to form and lead the Chicago chapter of the American Anti-Slavery Society, along with Dr. Charles V. Dyer, Robert Freeman, and Calvin DeWolf.

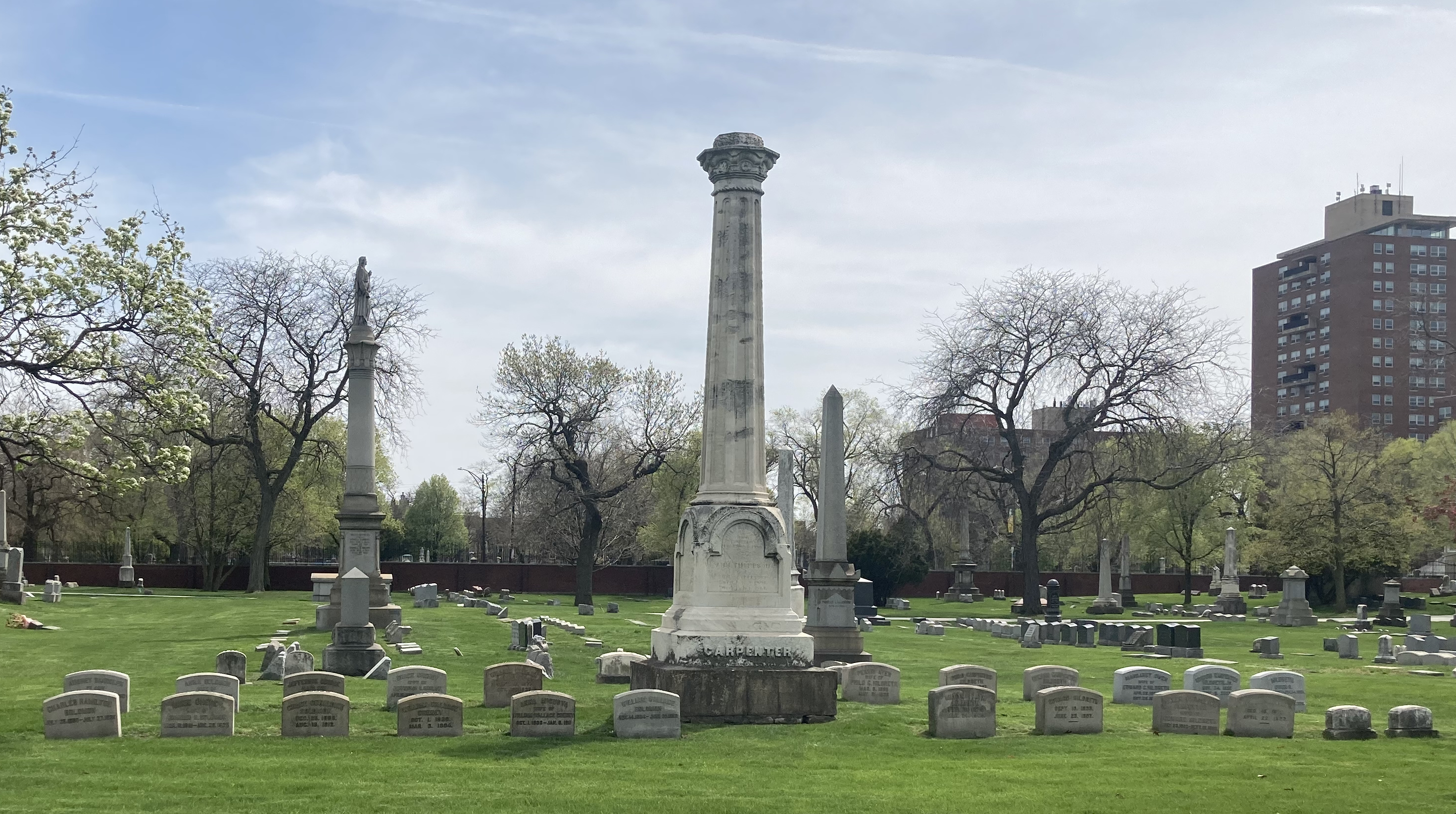
Carpenter's grave at Graceland Cemetery

He ran for mayor of Chicago twice on the Liberty Party ticket, losing to John Putnam Chapin in 1846, and to James Curtiss in 1847.

Carpenter served as a member of the Chicago Board of Education.

The aftermath of the fire of 1871 saw Carpenter in another leadership role as he organized the Relief and Aid Society. He also was a member of the Chicago Board of Health, and was a crusader for temperance reform.

He died at his daughter's home in Chicago on August 7, 1886, and was buried at Graceland Cemetery.

== Legacy ==
The first school to bear his name was built in 1868 on the same site, to the east of the present school which opened in 1957. Carpenter School was closed in 2013. One of his daughters, Augusta Carpenter, is the namesake of Chicago's Augusta Boulevard.
