= 1839 Chicago mayoral election =

Chicago mayoral election, 1839
- March 5, 1839
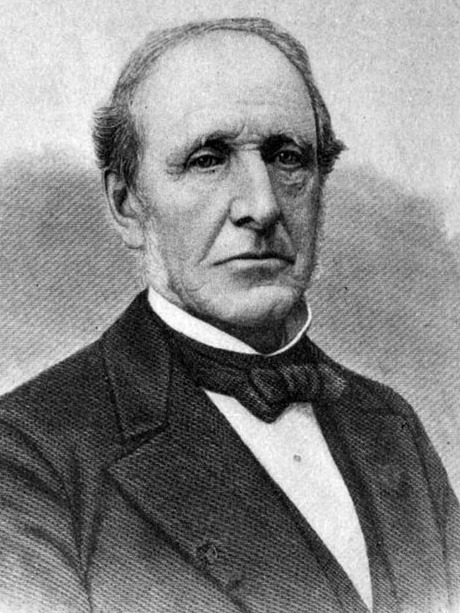

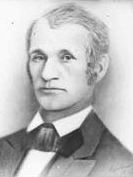
Candidate	Benjamin Wright Raymond	James Curtiss
Party	Whig	Democratic
Popular vote	353	212
Percentage	62.48%	37.52%
Mayor before election
Buckner Stith Morris
Whig
Elected mayor
Benjamin Wright Raymond
Whig

The 1839 Chicago mayoral election saw Whig nominee Benjamin Wright Raymond defeat Democratic nominee James Curtiss by a landslide 25 point margin.

The election was held on March 5.

== Campaign ==
With the nation enduring a difficult economic recession, many citizens believed that successful merchant Benjamin Raymond would be a wise choice for the city's next mayor. However, Raymond was initially not amenable to the prospect of serving as mayor. When former mayor William B. Ogden attempted to persuade him at his dry goods store to run for mayor, Raymond initially, "leaped over the counter and knocked Mr. Ogden prostrate with a bolt of factory-cloth." However, Raymond was nonetheless eventually persuaded to run for mayor.

== Results ==
1839 Chicago mayoral election
Party	Candidate	Votes	%
Whig	Benjamin Wright Raymond	353	62.48
Democratic	James Curtiss	212	37.52
Turnout		565	
