= 1838 Chicago mayoral election =

Chicago mayoral election, 1838
- March 6, 1838
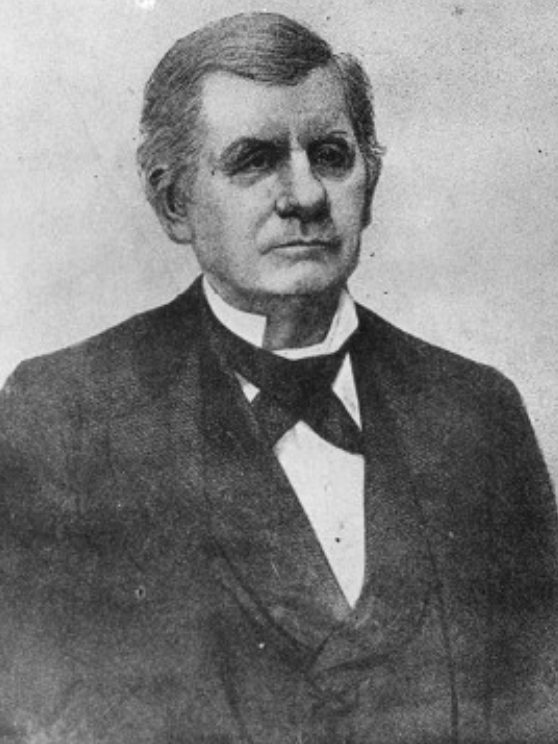

Candidate	Buckner Stith Morris	William Jones
Party	Whig	Democratic
Popular vote	377	318
Percentage	54.25%	45.76%
Mayor before election
William B. Ogden
Democratic
Elected mayor
Buckner Stith Morris
Whig

The 1838 Chicago mayoral election saw Whig nominee Buckner Stith Morris defeat Democrat William Jones by an 8.5 point margin.

The election was held on March 6.

== Results ==
1839 Chicago mayoral election
Party	Candidate	Votes	%
Whig	Buckner Stith Morris	377	54.25
Democratic	William Jones	318	45.76
Turnout		695	
