= 1844 Chicago mayoral elections =

The 1844 Chicago mayoral elections is the first of only two instances in which a Chicago mayoral election was declared invalid (the other being the disputed April 1876 mayoral election).

As a result of the Common Council declaring the result of the city's March 1844 mayoral election null and void, a second election was held in April.

While the result of the March election had been a victory for incumbent mayor Augustus Garrett, Garrett was defeated in the April election by Alson Sherman, who had not been a candidate in March.

== March election ==
March 1844 Chicago mayoral election
- March 4, 1844
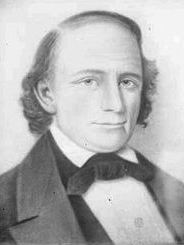

Nominee	Augustus Garrett	George W. Dole	Henry Smith
Party	Democratic	Whig	Liberty
Popular vote	805	798	193
Percentage	44.82%	44.43%	10.75%
Mayor before election
Augustus Garrett
Democratic
Elected mayor
Result of election voided

In the Chicago mayoral election of March 1844, Democrat Augustus Garrett was reelected, defeating Whig nominee George W. Dole by a margin of only seven votes out of 1,796 votes cast.

=== Campaign ===
In February incumbent mayor Augustus Garrett was unanimously nominated by the Democratic Party to run for reelection. George W. Dole was the Whig Party nominee. Also running was abolitionist Henry Smith, making this the third consecutive Chicago mayoral election he competed in.

=== Results ===
March 1844 Chicago mayoral election
Party	Candidate	Votes	%
Democratic	Augustus Garrett (incumbent)	805	44.82
Whig	George W. Dole	798	44.43
Liberty	Henry Smith	193	10.75
Turnout		1,796	

Had the results of this election not been overturned, Garrett would have become the first individual to be elected to two consecutive terms as mayor of Chicago. This accolade instead went to James H. Woodworth in 1849.

== Voiding of the March election ==
The Common Council investigated allegations that the Democrats had conducted electoral fraud in the mayoral election. Whigs alleged that the Democrats had bought votes, violated the secrecy of ballots in two wards (the 3rd and 5th), and altering the clocks at election places. The Common Council assembled an investigating committee which heard more than two weeks of testimony from more than thirty witnesses. While the committee ignored many allegations, the Common Council, nevertheless, ordered for a new election to be conducted on the grounds that clerks in wards had been unqualified to vote.

== April election ==
April 1844 Chicago mayoral election
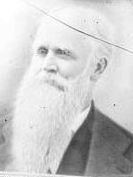

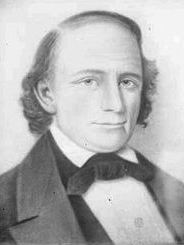

Nominee	Alson Sherman	Augustus Garrett	Henry Smith
Party	Independent Democrat	Democratic	Liberty
Popular vote	837	694	126
Percentage	50.51%	41.88%	7.60%
Mayor before election
Augustus Garrett
Democratic
Elected mayor
Alson Sherman
Independent Democrat

In the Chicago mayoral election of April 1844, Independent Democrat Alson Sherman defeated Democratic incumbent Augustus Garrett and Liberty Party nominee Henry Smith by a 9-point margin.

=== Results ===
April 1844 Chicago mayoral election
Party	Candidate	Votes	%
Independent Democrat	Alson Sherman	837	50.51
Democratic	Augustus Garrett (incumbent)	694	41.88
Liberty	Henry Smith	126	7.60
Turnout		1,657	
