= 1837 Chicago mayoral election =

Chicago mayoral election, 1837
May 2, 1837	1838 →
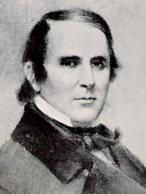

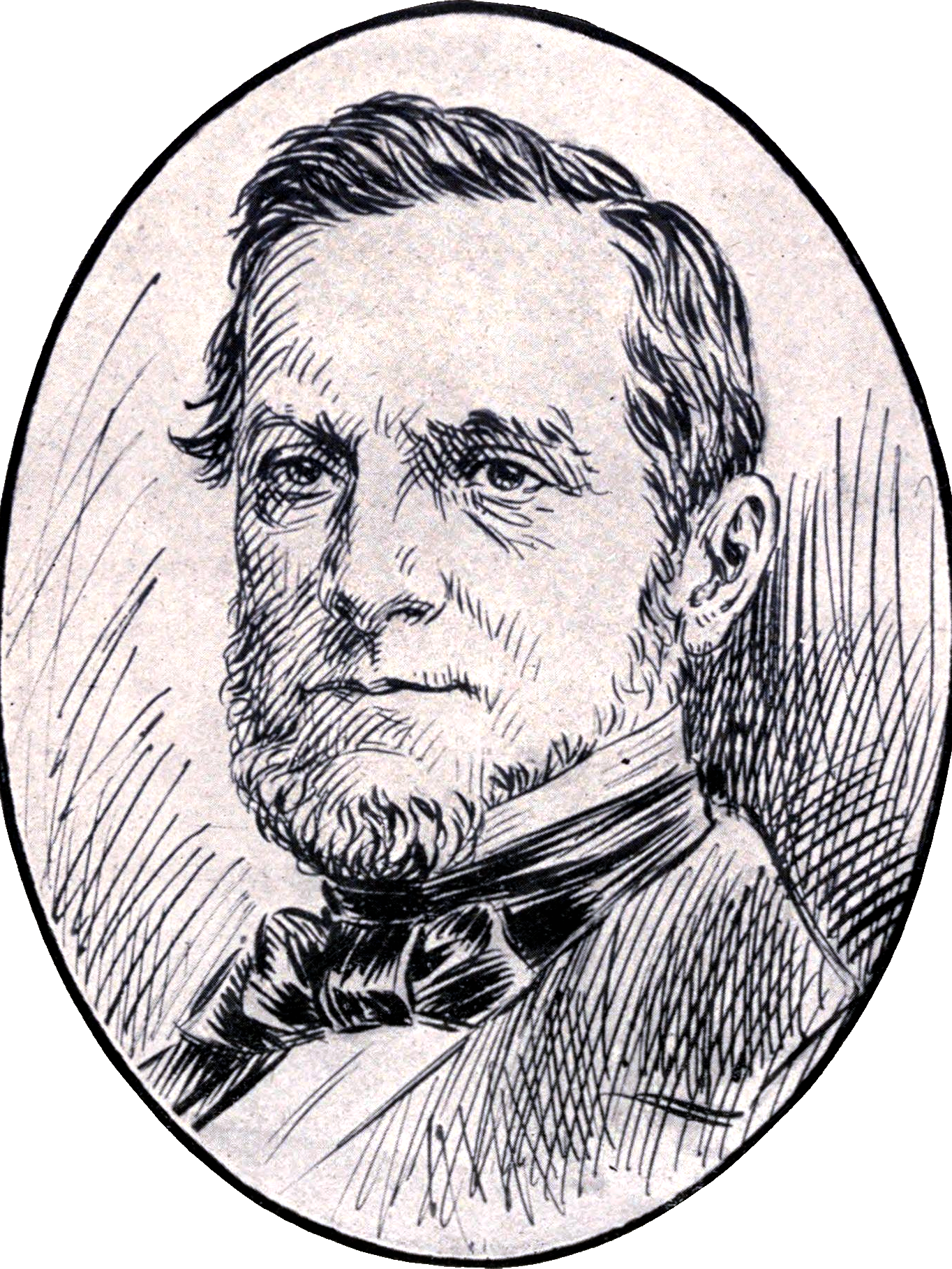
Candidate	William B. Ogden	John H. Kinzie
Party	Democratic	Whig
Popular vote	470	233
Percentage	66.86%	33.14%
Mayor before election
John H. Kinzie (as Town President)
Whig
Elected mayor
William B. Ogden
Democratic

The 1837 Chicago mayoral election was held on May 2, 1837. It was the first Chicago mayoral election, taking place the same year as Chicago's incorporation as a city. Democratic candidate William B. Ogden defeated Whig incumbent Town President John H. Kinzie by a landslide 38.5 point margin.

Shortly after the election Ogden was sworn in as Chicago's first mayor. This set the precedent of scheduling Chicago's mayoral inauguration for the month of May, a practice which has continued for most of the city's history into the present.

The election coincided with elections to the Common Council. In addition to winning the mayor's office, Democrats took all 10 seats of the Common Council.

== Campaign ==
Prominent Chicagoan W. B. Egan had been considered a potential candidate, however he refused to run.

Kinzie was backed by individuals such as Gurdon Saltonstall Hubbard.

Chicago had quickly been becoming a stronghold for the Whig Party. To overcome this trend, Democrats Francis Sherman, John Wentworth, and Peter Pruyne convinced William B. Ogden to run on their party's ticket. Wentworth, being editor of the city's Chicago Democrat newspaper, used the paper to support Ogden's candidacy.

Kinzie campaigned on a platform advocating the extension of Chicago's plank roads into the countryside. Ogden ran a more railroad-centric candidacy, believing that the railroads were the lifeline for the city's future.

Making use of his roots in the city, as the son of early settlers, Kinzie's supporters used the slogan "First born of Chicago" to promote him. Kinzie had the backing of old settlers, such as Gurdon Saltonstall Hubbard. Detractors of Ogden accused him of being a "transient speculator" whose only aim was to make money off of Chicago before returning to New York. However, this line of attack was rendered ineffective by the fact that, by this time, eastern newcomers made up a majority of the city's populace.

Kinzie, being popular figure, initially seemed to have an advantage in the election.

== Voting procedure ==
Voting was done viva voce. Individuals would walk up to a table and orally announce their vote, for all to eavesdrop upon. Each ward had a single polling place.

The polling places for each ward were:

- 1st: The "Eagle", No. 10 Dearborn Avenue
- 2nd: Lincoln Coffee House
- 3rd: Charles Taylor's House, Canal Street
- 4th: Chicago Hotel, northeast corner of Canal and Lake Streets
- 5th: Canal office, North Water Street
- 6th: Franklin House, North Water Street

== Results ==
1839 Chicago mayoral election
Party	Candidate	Votes	%
Democratic	William B. Ogden	470	66.86
Whig	John H. Kinzie	233	33.14
Total votes		703	100.00

=== Results by ward ===
Ogden won in every ward, even defeating Kinzie in his own ward by a single vote.

Ward	Ogden		Kinzie		Total Votes
Ward	Votes	%	Votes	%	Total Votes
1st	102	61.1%	65	38.9%	167
2nd	182	74.9%	61	25.1%	243
3rd	21	60.0%	14	40.0%	35
4th	34	64.2%	19	35.9%	53
5th	58	96.7%	2	3.3%	60
6th	73	50.4%	72	49.7%	145
