= Cities and Villages Act of 1872 =

The Cities and Villages Act of 1872 was an act of the Illinois General Assembly governing the operation of incorporated municipalities. The act was an immediate source of political controversy. The legacy of the Act is that Illinois municipal elections take place in the spring while county, state, and federal elections continue to occur on the federal Election Day.

== History ==
The Act was adopted by the State of Illinois on April 10, 1872, and went into force on July 1 of the same year. The purpose of the Act was to provide a standard outline and means for villages and cities in the state to incorporate without requiring separate legislation for each application.

On April 23, 1875, the city of Chicago voted to operate under the Act, as opposed to operating under the city charter which had previously been in effect. The Act has been revised since then, and is located in Chapter 65 of the Illinois Compiled Statutes.

Despite this operation, the Illinois State Constitution was later amended by the addition of Article VII (Adopted September 3, 1970; Entered into force July 1, 1971) which grants home rule powers to Chicago. Among those powers are regulation for the protection of public health, safety, morals, and welfare, to license for regulatory purposes, to tax, and to incur debt.

== Legal implications for Chicago ==
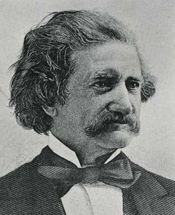
Thomas Hoyne, irregularly elected Mayor

The act moved Mayoral elections to April, whereas they had previously taken place in November. The politically manipulated late April adoption date effectively canceled the 1875 election for Mayor of Chicago. The act also lengthened the Mayoral term from 1 year to 2 years and expanded Mayoral powers. The law was ambiguous on the extension of the one year-term of the incumbent mayor, Harvey Doolittle Colvin.

In the November 1875 elections, neither the Republicans nor the Democrats ran a candidate for mayor, believing that there was no election. An independent candidate, Thomas Hoyne, received over 82% of the votes for Mayor of Chicago. Colvin refused to surrender his seat, which led to turmoil until a court ruling declared him Mayor until a special election and thus nullified Hoyne's election.

Chicago continues to have municipal elections in the spring. In 1907, four-year mayoral terms were ushered in, and 1935 saw the first 4-year aldermanic terms.
