= Alexander Loyd =

American politician

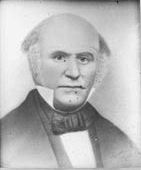

4th Mayor of Chicago
- In office March 9, 1840 – March 4, 1841
- Preceded by: Benjamin Wright Raymond
- Succeeded by: Francis Cornwall Sherman

Chief Engineer of the Chicago Fire Department
- In office 1839–1839
- Mayor: Benjamin Wright Raymond
- Preceded by: John M. Turner
- Succeeded by: Alvin Calhoun

Chicago Alderman from the 2nd ward
- In office 1850–1851 Serving with Isaac Lawrence Milliken
- Preceded by: George W. Snow
- Succeeded by: Hugh Maher

Chicago Village Trustee
- In office 1835–1836

Personal details
- Born: August 19, 1805 Orange County, New York
- Died: May 7, 1872 (aged 66) West Lyons, IL
- Resting place: Rosehill Cemetery
- Party: Democratic

Alexander Loyd (also Alexander Lloyd) (August 19, 1805 – May 7, 1872) served one term as mayor of Chicago, Illinois from 1840 until 1841 for the Democratic Party.

== Early life and career ==
Loyd was born in Orange County, New York. He arrived in Chicago in 1833, and opened a shop. Within four years, he was considered a principal contractor, carpenter and builder in Chicago. Loyd was of Welsh descent.

He was elected to the Chicago Board of Trustees in 1835. By then, he was a member of the volunteer Fire Department, and became Chief Engineer in 1838, serving for one year.

== Mayoralty ==
Loyd became the 4th Mayor of Chicago in 1840, defeating incumbent Whig Benjamin Wright Raymond.

Lloyd was sworn in as mayor on March 9, 1840.

His mayoralty ended on March 4, 1841, when he was succeeded in office by fellow Democrat Francis Cornwall Sherman.

== Post-mayoralty ==
He served as a Trustee of the 2nd district of the Chicago Schools in 1842. When G. W. Snow resigned in 1850 as an alderman on the Chicago Common Council (city council) from the 2nd ward, Loyd was elected to finish Snow's term. He served on the council for one year.

He died in 1872, of "rheumatism of the heart" and was buried in Rosehill Cemetery.
