= John Putnam Chapin =

American politician

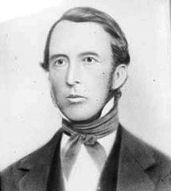

10th Mayor of Chicago
- In office March 3, 1846 – March 9, 1847
- Preceded by: Augustus Garrett
- Succeeded by: James Curtiss

Chicago Alderman from 1st ward
- In office 1844–1845 Serving with Asher Rossiter
- Preceded by: Cyrenus Beers and Hugh T. Dickey
- Succeeded by: Thomas Church and J. Young Scammon

Personal details
- Born: April 21, 1810 Bradford, Vermont
- Died: June 27, 1864 (aged 54) Chicago, Illinois
- Resting place: Graceland Cemetery
- Party: Whig

John Putnam Chapin (April 21, 1810 – June 27, 1864) served as the 10th Mayor of Chicago, Illinois (1846–1847) for the Whig Party.

Chapin left his hometown to enter the mercantile business in Haverhill, New Hampshire before moving to Chicago in 1832. In Chicago he became a member of the wholesale and retail merchants firm Wadsworth, Dyer & Chapin until it was dissolved in 1843. Following the dissolution of the firm, Chapin joined the Canal Boat Transportation Company. He was a founding member of the Chicago Board of Trade, and served several terms as its vice president.

From 1844 to 1845, Chapin served a single term as Chicago alderman from the 1st ward.

In 1846, Chapin ran for mayor of Chicago as a Whig against Democratic nominee Charles Follansbee and Liberty Party nominee Philo Carpenter, winning the office with just over 55% of the vote.

Following his term as Mayor, Chapin was elected to the city council in 1859. In 1861, he was nominated by the Union ticket for the office of Commissioner of Public Works. Since Chapin was a staunch Republican, he declined the nomination as he felt it was a mischievous move on the part of the Democrats.

He died in Chicago on June 27, 1864, and was buried at Graceland Cemetery.
