= Buckner Stith Morris =

American mayor (1800–1879)

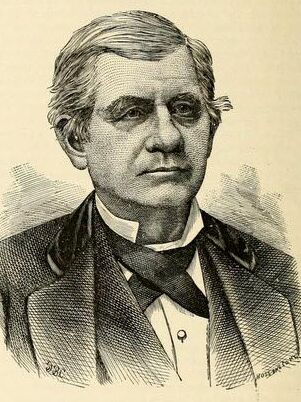

2nd Mayor of Chicago
- In office 1838–1839
- Preceded by: William B. Ogden
- Succeeded by: Benjamin Wright Raymond

Lake County Circuit Court Judge
- In office 1853–1855

Chicago Alderman from the 6th ward
- In office 1844–1844 Serving with Michael Diversey
- Preceded by: George W. Dole/ J. Marback
- Succeeded by: James H. Rees
- In office 1839–1840 Serving with John H. Kinzie
- Preceded by: George W. Dole/ Grant Goodrich
- Succeeded by: R.J. Hamilton/ William B. Ogden

Personal details
- Born: August 19, 1800 Augusta, Kentucky
- Died: December 16, 1879 (aged 79) Chicago, Illinois
- Party: Whig, American
- Spouses: Evelina Barker (1832–1847); Eliza Stephenson (1850–1855)
- Profession: Lawyer

Buckner Stith Morris (August 19, 1800 – December 16, 1879) served as mayor of Chicago, Illinois (1838–1839) for the Whig Party.

== Career ==
In Chicago, Morris established a law practice with J. Young Scammon. He helped to create the Chicago Lyceum, the city's first literary society. By 1835, however, Morris had left his partnership with Scammon, and was practicing law with Edward Casey.

He was elected mayor of Chicago in 1838 and went would subsequently serve as Alderman from the 6th ward from 1839 to 1840 and again in 1844, resigning during his second tenure as alderman. He unsuccessfully ran for the office of Illinois Secretary of State in 1852 under the Whig ticket and served as a Lake County Circuit Court Judge from 1853 to 1855.

Following Evelina's death in 1847, he married Eliza Stephenson in 1850. Eliza died in 1855.

In 1856, he was the Know Nothing nominee for governor.

Morris was outspoken in his opposition to the American Civil War, and appeared to sympathize with the Copperheads. In 1864, he was arrested for aiding in a Confederate attempt to free prisoners of war from Camp Douglas in Chicago. He was held for 9 months, but was then exonerated by a military court. Being unable, while so detained, to attend to his business affairs, he lost most of his assets through foreclosures. Incensed over the treatment of their ancestor, his heirs refused to donate his papers to the Chicago Historical Society when they were requested.

== "To hell in a hand basket" ==
The first recorded use in the Oxford English Dictionary of the phrase "to hell in a hand basket" is in The Great North-Western Conspiracy in All Its Startling Details, by I. Windslow Ayer, in alleging that, at a meeting of the Order of the Sons of Liberty, Judge Morris of the Circuit Court of Illinois said: "Thousands of our best men were prisoners in Camp Douglas, and if once at liberty would 'send abolitionists to hell in a hand basket.'" Note that he was portrayed as Judge Morris in that anecdote dated 1865, although his time on the bench was of the previous decade.

== Personal life and death ==
Morris was of Welsh descent. In 1832, he married Evelina Barker in Kentucky and the couple moved to Chicago in 1834.

Morris was a member of Chicago's oldest meeting Freemason Lodge, Oriental Lodge # 33.

Morris died in Chicago in 1879.

== See also ==
- Camp Douglas Conspiracy

Party political offices
First	Know Nothing nominee for Governor of Illinois; 1856	Succeeded by None
