= Augustus Garrett =

American politician

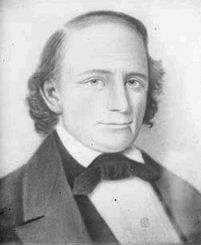

7th and 9th Mayor of Chicago
- In office March 10, 1845 – March 3, 1846
- Preceded by: Alson Sherman
- Succeeded by: John Putnam Chapin
- In office March 7, 1843 – April 2, 1844
- Preceded by: Benjamin Wright Raymond
- Succeeded by: Alson Sherman

Chicago Alderman from the 2nd ward
- In office 1840–1841 Serving with James Carney
- Preceded by: Eli S. Prescott/ Clement C. Stose
- Succeeded by: Jason McCord/ Peter Page

Personal details
- Born: 1801 New York, United States
- Died: November 30, 1848 (aged 46–47) Chicago, Illinois, U.S.
- Resting place: Rosehill Cemetery
- Party: Democratic Party
- Spouse: Eliza Clark

Augustus Garrett (1801 – November 30, 1848) was an American politician who twice served as Mayor of Chicago (1843–1844, 1845–1846). He was a member of the Democratic Party.

== Early life and career ==
Garrett married Eliza Clark in 1825 in Newburgh, New York. The couple's daughter Imogene was born in 1830. Departing New York, the Garretts lived in Cincinnati for a time, but had to flee the city after getting in debt. Moving to New Orleans, the couple's young daughter died of cholera in 1833 and was buried on the banks of the Mississippi. The Garretts had a second child, a son named Charles, in 1834. The Garretts also had another son, John.

== Move to Chicago ==
Facing difficulties in New Orleans as well, the Garretts separated for a short while - Augustus to Chicago, while Eliza returned to Newburgh. Reuniting in 1835 in Chicago, the couple worked in real estate and prospered. Garrett had a small auction house near the Chicago River and by the following year had formed a partnership with the Brown Brothers, which allowed him to become a leading land speculator and auctioneer. By October 1836, he had sales of more than $1.8 million.

From 1840 through 1841, he served as Chicago alderman from the 2nd ward.

== Mayoralties ==
In 1842, Garrett ran unsuccessfully for Mayor of Chicago. He ran again in 1843 and was elected.

In 1844, Garrett initially won re-election, only to have the election invalidated based on charges of "illegal proceedings and fraud." Garrett ran in a second election that year, but lost to Alson Sherman.

Garrett was again elected mayor in 1845.

During his terms in office, Garrett pushed to have the first brick school in Chicago, Dearborn School, turned into either a warehouse or an insane asylum, believing that the building was too large for use as a school.

== Death and legacy ==
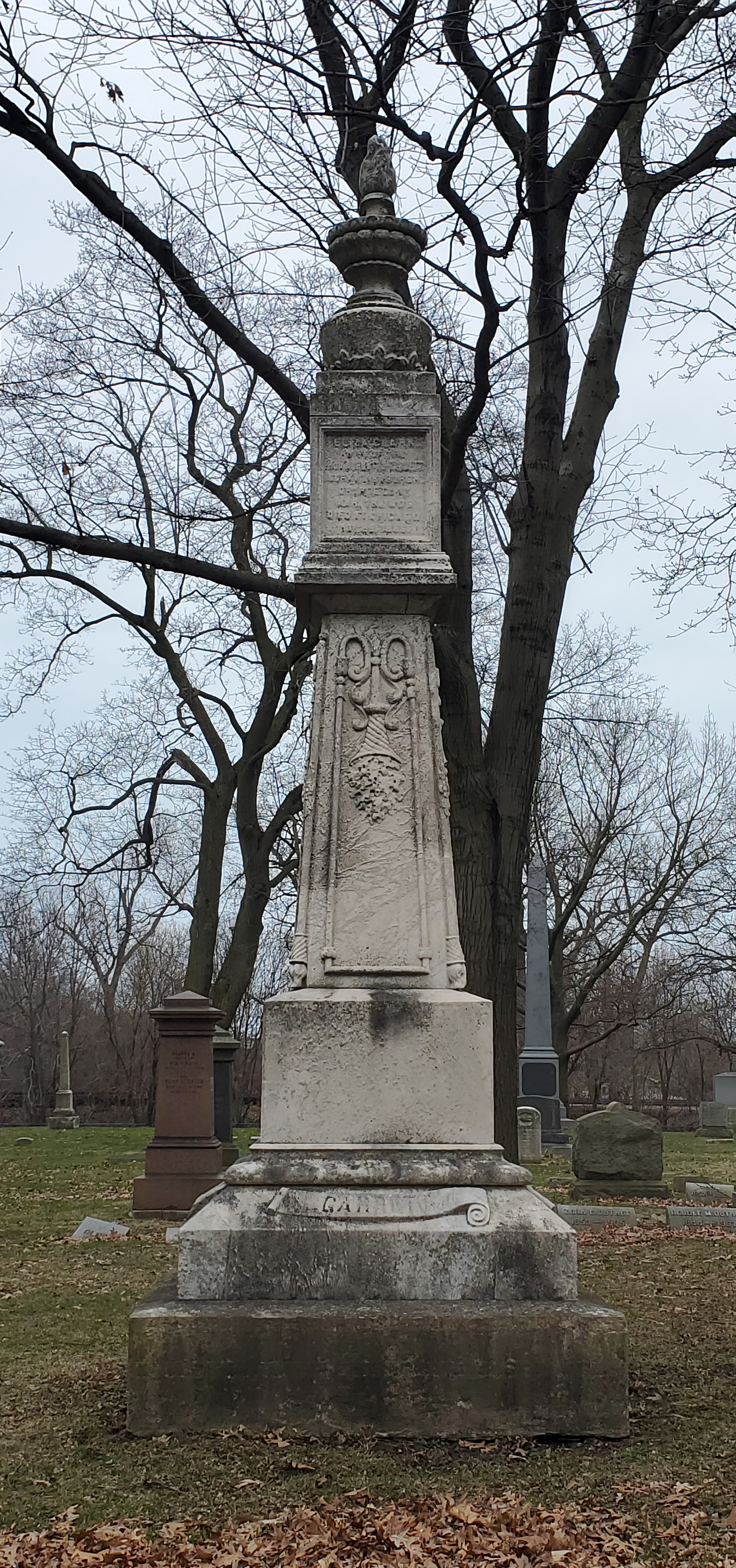
Garrett's grave at Rosehill Cemetery

Augustus Garrett died at the Sherman House Hotel in Chicago on November 30, 1848, and was buried in Rosehill Cemetery. Following his death, Eliza established the Garrett Bible Institute, now Garrett-Evangelical Theological Seminary, in nearby Evanston, Illinois.
