= List of elections in 1884 =

The following elections occurred in the year 1884:

== Europe ==
- 1884 Belgian general election
- 1884 Bulgarian parliamentary election
- 1884 Croatian parliamentary election
- 1884 Danish Folketing election
- 1884 German federal election
- 1884 Hungarian parliamentary election
- 1884 Luxembourg general election
- 1884 Paisley by-election
- 1884 Portuguese legislative election
- 1884 Serbian parliamentary election
- 1884 Spanish general election
- 1884 Swedish general election
- 1884 Swiss federal election

== North America ==
=== United States ===
- 1884 New York state election
- 1884 United States elections

==== United States Presidential ====
- 1884 United States presidential election

==== United States Senate ====
- 1884 and 1885 United States Senate elections

==== United States House of Representatives ====
- 1884 United States House of Representatives elections
- United States House of Representatives elections in California, 1884
- 1884 United States House of Representatives elections in Florida
- United States House of Representatives elections in South Carolina, 1884

==== United States lieutenant gubernatorial ====
- 1884 Connecticut lieutenant gubernatorial election
- 1884 Illinois lieutenant gubernatorial election
- 1884 Missouri lieutenant gubernatorial election
- 1884 Nebraska lieutenant gubernatorial election
- 1884 Texas lieutenant gubernatorial election
- 1884 Wisconsin lieutenant gubernatorial election

==== United States gubernatorial ====
- 1884 Alabama gubernatorial election
- 1884 Arkansas gubernatorial election
- 1884 Colorado gubernatorial election
- 1884 Connecticut gubernatorial election
- 1884 Florida gubernatorial election
- 1884 Georgia gubernatorial election
- 1884 Illinois gubernatorial election
- 1884 Indiana gubernatorial election
- 1884 Kansas gubernatorial election
- 1884 Louisiana gubernatorial election
- 1884 Maine gubernatorial election
- 1884 Massachusetts gubernatorial election
- 1884 Michigan gubernatorial election
- 1884 Missouri gubernatorial election
- 1884 Nebraska gubernatorial election
- 1884 New Hampshire gubernatorial election
- 1884 North Carolina gubernatorial election
- 1884 Rhode Island gubernatorial election
- 1884 South Carolina gubernatorial election
- 1884 Tennessee gubernatorial election
- 1884 Texas gubernatorial election
- 1884 Vermont gubernatorial election
- 1884 West Virginia gubernatorial election
- 1884 Wisconsin gubernatorial election

==== United States mayoral elections ====
- 1884 Boston mayoral election
- 1884 Manchester, New Hampshire, mayoral election
- 1884 Philadelphia mayoral election

== Oceania ==
- 1884 New Zealand general election

== See also ==
- Category:1884 elections
