= Carter Harrison III =

American politician (1825–1893)

Carter Harrison
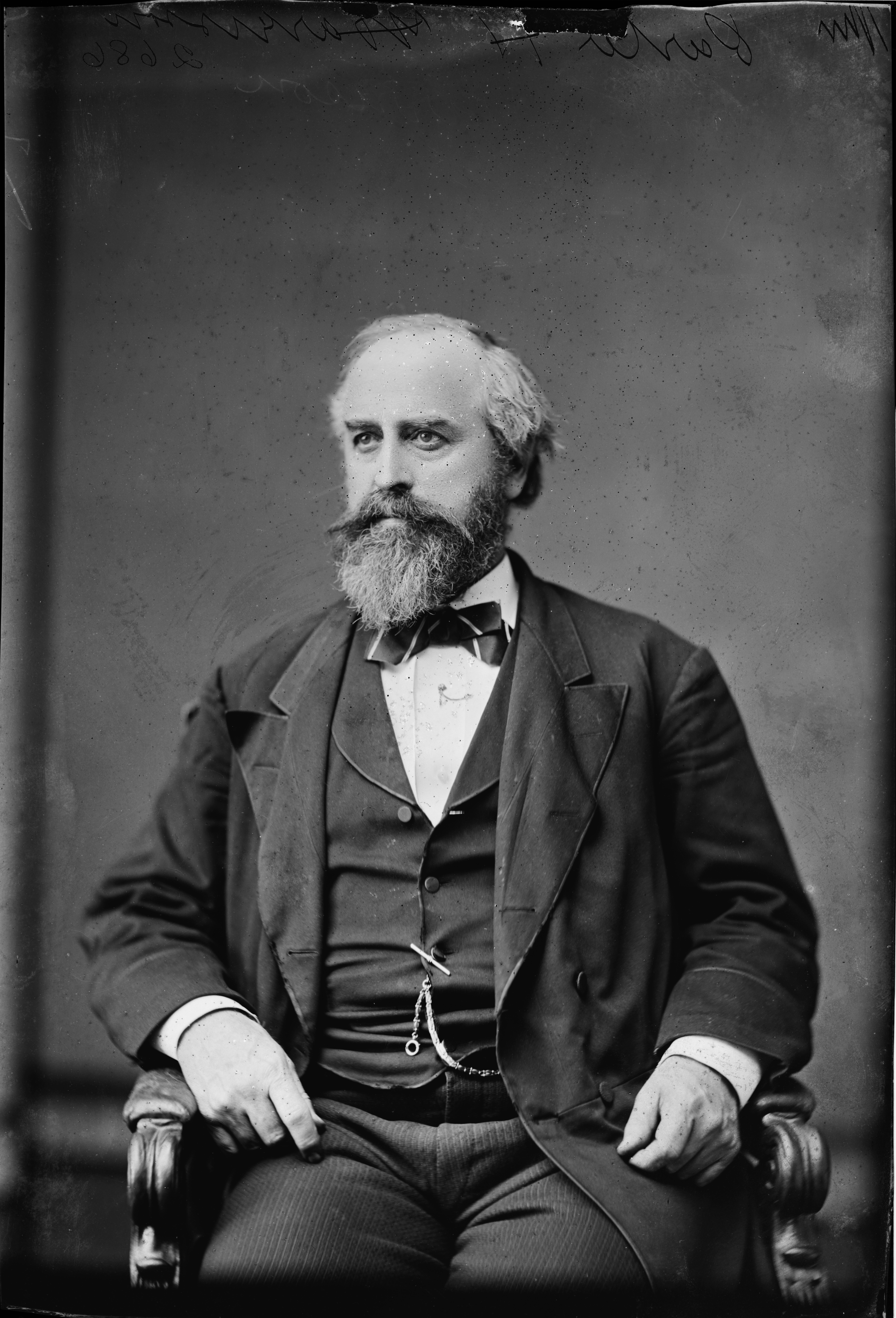
- Portrait by Mathew Brady and Levin Corbin Handy

Mayor of Chicago
- In office April 17, 1893 – October 28, 1893
- Preceded by: Hempstead Washburne
- Succeeded by: John Patrick Hopkins; George Bell Swift (acting)
- In office April 28, 1879 – April 18, 1887
- Preceded by: Monroe Heath
- Succeeded by: John A. Roche

Member of the U.S. House of Representatives from Illinois's 2nd district
- In office March 4, 1875 – March 3, 1879
- Preceded by: Jasper D. Ward
- Succeeded by: George R. Davis

Member of the Cook County Board of Commissioners
- In office 1871–1875
- Preceded by: position established

Personal details
- Born: Carter Henry Harrison; February 15, 1825 near Lexington, Kentucky, U.S.
- Died: October 28, 1893 (aged 68) Chicago, Illinois, U.S.
- Cause of death: Assassination by gunshot
- Resting place: Graceland Cemetery
- Party: Democratic
- Spouse(s): Margarette Stearns (m. 1882; died 1887) Sophonisba Grayson Preston (m. 1855; died 1876)
- Domestic partner: Annie Howard
- Children: 10, including Carter IV
- Education: Yale University (BA); Transylvania University (LLB)
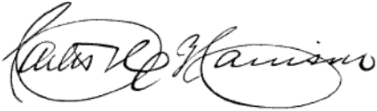
- Signature

Carter Henry Harrison III (February 15, 1825 – October 28, 1893) was an American politician who served as mayor of Chicago, Illinois, from 1879 until 1887 and from 1893 until his assassination. He previously served two terms in the United States House of Representatives, and one term on the Cook County Board of Commissioners.

Harrison was a working-class aligned populist, and attained much political support among the labor unionists and Catholic white-ethnic immigrants of the city. While wealthy himself, Harrison fell into political disfavor among many of the city's business elites in his late political career. He was the father of Carter Harrison IV, who himself served five terms as the mayor of Chicago.

A 1994 survey of experts on Chicago politics assessed Harrison as one of the ten best mayors in the city's history (up to that time). (Note: The others in the top-ten were Anton Cermak (mayor 1931–33); Richard J. Daley (mayor 1955–76); Richard M. Daley (then-incumbent mayor since 1989); Edward Fitzsimmons Dunne (mayor 1905–07); Carter Harrison IV (mayor 1897–1905 and 1911–15); Edward Joseph Kelly (mayor 1933–47); William B. Ogden (mayor 1837–38); Harold Washington (mayor 1983–87); John Wentworth (mayor 1857–58 and 1860–61))

== Early life, education, and career ==
Carter Henry Harrison was born on a plantation on February 15, 1825, in rural Fayette County, Kentucky near Lexington, Kentucky to Carter Henry Harrison II and Caroline Russell. He was birthed in his family's home, a log cabin (as one obituary would remark, "he saw the light in a log hut in a canebrake in Fayette County.") When Harrison was merely eight months old, his father died.

Harrison's family had a long Southern lineage, dating back to early colonial Virginia. He had ancestry in the Harrison family of Virginia, the Randolph family of Virginia, Carter family of Virginia, and Cabell family of Virginia. Harrison was a descendant of Richard A. Harrison, (a lieutenant general to Oliver Cromwell during the First English Civil War who had been involved in carrying out the execution of Charles I). His great-great-grandfather was Charles Harrison (brother to Carter Henry Harrison I and founding father Benjamin Harrison V, and a cousin of president Thomas Jefferson). Carter Harrison III was a cousin of U.S. Vice President John C. Breckinridge, and was a first cousin twice removed of U.S. President William Henry Harrison (thus making him also related to U.S. President Benjamin Harrison).

Harrison was educated by private tutors. At the age of fifteen, he began to be tutored by Louis Marshall. Harrison graduated from Yale College in 1845 as a member of Scroll and Key. He graduated from Yale in 1851. Following graduation, he traveled the world and studied in Europe from 1851 to 1853. His travels took him to England, Ireland, Scotland, and elsewhere. He also visited Egypt and accompanied Bayard Taylor to explore Syria and Asia Minor. After his world travels, he entered Transylvania College in Lexington in 1853, where he earned a law degree in 1855.

== Move to Chicago, and early career in the city ==
In 1855, Harrison wed his first wife, Sophy Preston. While traveling North for their honeymoon, Harrison stopped in Chicago and decided to settle there. He had decided to settle in Chicago because he saw it as a land of opportunity. At the time, he inherited the Kentucky plantation and almost 100 slaves but sold it away in order to be done with slavery.

After settling in Chicago, Harrison invested in real estate in Chicago, and became a millionaire. Harrison was also admitted to the bar in 1855, and commenced practice once he settled in Chicago.

The first property that Harrison bought in Chicago was the Adams house located at the corners of Clark and Harrison Street.

== Cook County Board of Commissioners (1871–1875) ==
Harrison was a nominee of the Democratic Party for Illinois House of Representatives in 1870. One year later, shortly after the Great Chicago Fire, he became further involved in politics. In the county elections, Harrison himself was elected to the Cook County Board of Commissioners. He had run on a "union" ticket (dubbed the "Fireproof Ticket") that featured members of the Democratic and Republican parties; Harrison had been the leading figure in the formation of the Union–Fireproof Ticket and had served as the chair of its nominating convention. The ticket ran candidates in both the Cook County and Chicago municipal elections (including in the mayoral election). The ticket's mayoral nominee, Joseph Medill, won election. Harrison had been key in convincing Medill to run for mayor. Later, during Harrison's own career in citywide politics, Medill, publisher of the Chicago Tribune, would come to be a political rival of Harrison's.

In addition to being included on the Union–Fireproof ticket, Harrison was also included as a county board nominee on the joint slate nominated by both the Cook County Democratic Party and the Cook County Republican Party in the 1871 county and Chicago municipal elections (who partnered due to the extenuating circumstances of the fire).

Harrison served a single term on the county board, for three years. (Note: The 1871 Cook County Board of Commissioners election included elections for three, two, and one year terms. Harrison was one of five members elected to serve a three-year term.)

== U.S. House of Representatives (1875–1879) ==
Harrison represented Illinois's 2nd congressional district for two terms (from 1875 until 1879). During the relevant period, with the exception of the 6th ward, the district represented all of Chicago's "West Division" wards (the 7th, 8th, 9th, 10th, 11th, 12th, 13th, 14th, and 15th wards). During his time in congress, Harrison was noted for his flamboyant oration.

In an obituary for Harrison, The Washington Post later recounted,

Harrison had previously demonstrated the possession of strong and excellent qualities during his brief career in Congress. In whatever position he was placed he was always a commanding and picturesque figure, not an orator in the classic sense of the term, but one of the most effective speakers of the day; not a statesman, but a man of vast resource and courageous grasp; not perfection but one who did much good in his day, who was true to his friends, who was charitable to the poor, who left the impress of his indomitable energy upon whatever he undertook.

=== Unsuccessful 1872 campaign ===
Early into his tenure on the county board, Harrison ran an unsuccessful campaign in 1872 as the Democratic nominee in Illinois's 2nd congressional district for election to the 43rd United States Congress. Harrison faced Republican nominee Jasper D. Ward. The district had a strong Republican lean. Harrison, while unsuccessful, managed to greatly outperform previous Democratic nominees in the district. Harrison won 42.14% of the vote to Ward's 57.86%. Harrison led his opponent in the 8th and 9th wards, but trailed him in the other wards.

The congressional election coincided with the 1872 United States presidential election. Harrison (the Democratic congressional nominee) was listed on a local ticket that also included Liberal Republican Party presidential nominee Horace Greeley.

=== First term (1875–1877) ===
Due to his strong performance in his 1872 congressional campaign, in 1874 Harrison was again nominated in the 2nd congressional district by the Democratic Party for congress, and in a re-match against Ward won election 44th United States Congress by a margin of only eight votes. The Chicago Tribune would blame local Republicans' alignment with the Citizens Union ticket in the 1873 local Chicago elections as detrimental to Ward's re-election, as in the eyes of many voters it had placed Republicans on the less popular side of the "beer question", positioning them in support of enforcing Sunday temperance blue laws (laws banning the sale of alcohol on Sundays). Many voters who typically voted Republican had in 1873 voted for the People's Party instead of the Citizens Union ticket due to the "beer question" At the time he was elected, he had been out-of-country visiting Europe with his family (traveling to Austria, Germany, Switzerland, and the Tyrol). After learning of his election, he returned to the United States to take office.

In 1875, during his first term in Congress, Harrison and his family again traveled to Europe. After accompanying his family through Northern Europe, Harrison returned to the United States while the rest of his family continued their trip. However, Harrison traveled to Europe again after his first wife died there.

=== Second term (1877–1879) ===
While he was out of the country due to the death of his wife, he was re-elected in 1876 to the 45th United States Congress. He won 50.89% of the vote against Republican opponent George R. Davis.

Scandal occurred in his second term in congress when, as chairman of the Committee on Reform of the Civil Service, Harrison had pushed through the payment of benefits to four self-proclaimed Union Army veterans purporting disabilities from wartime injuries despite the fact that their claims had previously been rejected. None of these individuals had actually seen active service, and none of them had suffered serious injuries.

in 1878, Harrison lost re-election to congress. He was defeated by Miles Kehoe for re-nomination at the district's Democratic nominating convention.

== First mayoralty (1879–1887) ==
During his first mayoralty, Harrison was elected mayor of Chicago for four consecutive two-year terms (in 1879, 1881, 1883, and 1885).

After he campaigned in 1879 with a pet eagle, he became affectionately nicknamed "the Eagle".

He was sworn in for his first term on April 28, 1879.

During his first mayoralty, he surpassed his predecessor Monroe Heath's title as the longest serving mayor Chicago had had up to that time.

=== Leadership and popularity ===
Harrison has been described as a practitioner of charismatic authority. He governed the city in cooperation with a fractious Democratic Party organization.

While Harrison garnered both business and working class support, the evangelical middle class generally disapproved of Harrison.

=== Infrastructure and public safety ===
At the time he took office, Chicago had nearly a half-million residents. However, it was still a developing city. Harrison would later remark that, when he took office as mayor, "there were not ten miles of paved street in the whole city over which a light vehicle could move rapidly without injury to wheel or axle.” Long a booster of his adopted city, Harrison was known to refer to Chicago as his "bride". Harrison significantly increased the city's number of paved roads and sidewalks in its downtown and increased the size and improved the efficiency of its fire department. Harrison also forced utility companies operating in the central business district to bury their wires. Harrison fought the Illinois Central Railroad's right to the lakefront, a legal battle which was ultimately taken by the State of Illinois to Supreme Court of the United States in Illinois Central Railroad Co. v. Illinois. He also worked to persuade railroads to begin elevating their tracks to eliminate level crossings. He also attempted to push measures in the City Council that would have required locomotives, steamships and tugboats to burn anthracite, which burned cleaner. He also attempted to have the city build new and longer public water system intake pipes.

=== Haymarket affair ===
Harrison's first mayoral tenure was a period that saw many events which brought the city national and international attention. One such event was the Haymarket affair. Early on the evening of the Haymarket affair in 1886, Harrison had casually observed the then still peaceful demonstration of anarchists and trade unionists and advised the police to leave the demonstrators alone; he then left the scene before the riot and anarchist bomb-throwing occurred. A significant reason for his ability to attend the rally unbothered was that, while Harrison came from a Protestant background, he needed the votes of and thus made appeals to the city's large ethnic White Catholic population as well as its rapidly growing numbers of trade unionists. His administration gave the impression of being more favorable to trade unions and strikes than those of previous Chicago mayors as well as other mayors of the time, although his police force routinely put down striking workers and trade union activists when they interfered with the businesses hiring replacements.

In the aftermath, Harrison spoke against anti-socialist sentiments being published in the media. Harrison argued that socialists were not sympathetic with bomb throwers, and remarked that socialists were representatives of the country's "workers, thinkers, and writers."

=== 1884 Democratic National Convention ===
Harrison was a delegate to the 1880 and 1884 Democratic National Conventions. At the 1884 convention, held in Chicago, Harrison supported the successful candidacy of Grover Cleveland, and delivered the seconding speech for Cleveland's nomination at the convention. Harrison was also alleged to have ordered the Chicago police to fill the convention hall's convention hall with as many men sympathetic to Cleveland's candidacy as they could find on the street.

=== 1884 gubernatorial campaign ===
Heading encouragement from other Democrats, in 1884 Harrison ran as the party's nominee for governor of Illinois. While a reluctant nominee, he conducted an energetic and effective campaign. He lost to Republican incumbent Richard J. Oglesby. The result was unsurprising, considering that the state of Illinois had a strong Republican lean at the time. However, Harrison had managed to decrease the Republican margin of victory in the gubernatorial election from the 40,000 margin of the previous election to 14,500.

=== End of tenure ===
Towards the end of his fourth term, public approval of Harrison had significantly declined, which hurt his prospects of being re-elected to a fifth term in the 1887 mayoral election. Much of the dissatisfaction with Harrison came from disapproval of his handling of the Haymarket Riot. Harrison's handling of the Haymarket Riot had also harmed his standing with conservative business groups. Furthermore, Harrison's prospects of re-election to a fifth term were weighed down by a scandal involving criminal charges of election fraud against some of his supporters (for conduct during the previous mayoral election). Even though the charges against these individuals were did not implicate Harrison in misconduct, there was still concern that public awareness of the scandal would muddy Harrison's public image due to his proximity to the indicted individuals. Harrison's loss of public favor had led the prospect of re-nominating him to lose losing support within city's Democratic Party. Initially, Harrison maintained intention to be re-elected, and unsuccessfully attempted to persuade the United Labor Party to support him for re-election and to partner with the city Democratic Party to nominate a joint-slate. Harrison proposed a fusion nomination arrangement that would have seen the parties nominate identical tickets. Harrison's failure to persuade Chicago's United Labor Party to partner with city Democrats further harmed Harrison's support within the local Democratic party.

Recognizing that he would have difficulty being re-nominated by the Democratic Party, Harrison decided to retire at the end of his fourth term, opting against seeking re-election in 1887. The Democratic Party voted at its convention to nominate DeWitt Clinton Cregier. However, Cregier declined the nomination, refusing to run. After this (and despite his declared intent to retire), the party voted to re-nominate Harrison. Harrison initially accepted the nomination. However, before he could begin campaigning, his wife Elizabeth died. Experiencing great grief over his wife's passing, he withdrew from the election, and instead embarked on international travels. His tenure as mayor formally ended on April 18, 1887.

== Post-mayoralty ==
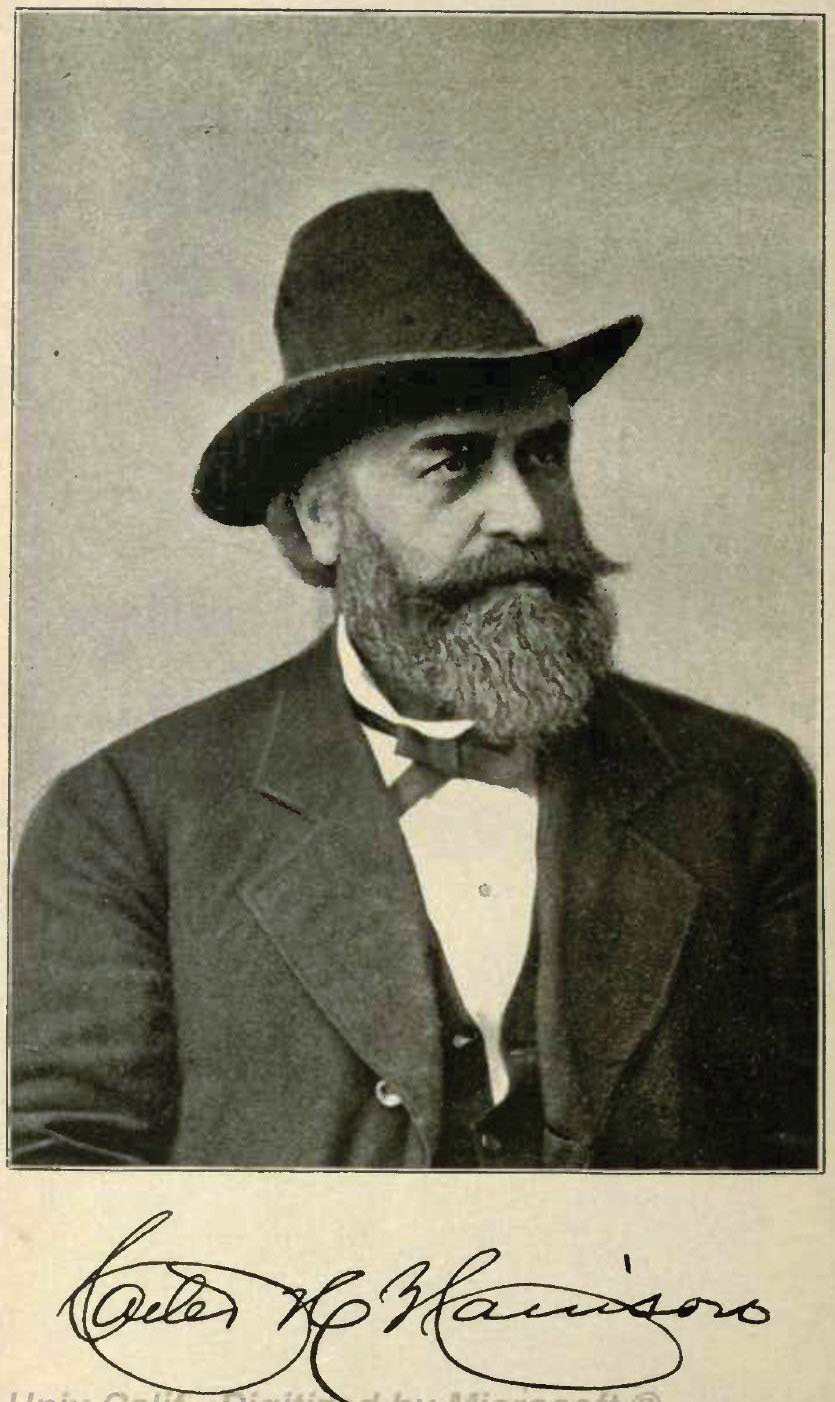
Frontispiece from A Summer's Outing (1891)

On July 26, 1887, Harrison embarked on international travels, taking a sixteen-month world tour. He concluded this trip on November 8, 1888. Harrison documented his travels in letters he wrote that were published in newspapers. He compiled his travel writings into a book, which was published under the title A Race With The Sun. After returning to Chicago, Harrison continued to be withdrawn from politics for several years. During this time, he focused on his business ventures and authoring literature. In 1890, Harrison and his daughter took a vacation trip from Chicago to Yellowstone National Park and Alaska. His letters from the trip were first published in the Chicago Tribune and later compiled into an 1891 book, A Summer's Outing and The Old Man's Story.

In 1891, Harrison became the owner and editor of the Chicago Times. This marked a return to political engagement, as he used this newspaper to advocate for labor unions and the many Catholic and immigrant communities in Chicago.

=== Unsuccessful 1891 mayoral campaign ===
Harrison unsuccessfully sought to stage a comeback, running in the 1891 Chicago mayoral election. Failing to receive the Democratic nomination (with incumbent mayor DeWitt Clinton Cregier being renominated instead), Harrison ran an independent campaign for mayor. The election became a four-candidate race between Harrison, Creiger, Republican nominee Hempstead Washburne, and Citizens nominee Elmer Washburn (a former head of the United States Secret Service and Chicago Police Department). Hempstead Washburne won the election, receiving only a few hundred more votes than runner-up Cregier and a few thousand more votes than Harrison. Elmer Washburn placed a more distant fourth.

== Second mayoralty (1893) ==
Harrison was again elected mayor in 1893, in time for the World's Columbian Exposition being held in the city. Harrison stated that his desire was to show the world the "true" Chicago during the world's fair.

Harrison was sworn in for his fifth nonconsecutive term on April 17, 1893. Harrison's first acts after being sworn in were to immediately submit vetoes of several ordinances that the council had already passed, one which served the interests of the Midland Elevated Railway (which stockbroker James R. Keene held significant stake in) and another which would have granted the Hygeia Springs Company permission to supply water into the city (which would have advanced a controversial project by Wisconsin businessman James C. McElroy to pipe water from the famed springs in Waukesha, Wisconsin to the grounds of the world's fair). Mayor Washburne had similarly vetoed the same ordinances in his final act as mayor. All vetoes were sustained.

A Washington Post obituary credited Harrison with having contributed largely to the success of the Exposition, "by his unwearying zeal in its behalf."

Harrison appointed 1st Ward Alderman "Bathhouse" John Coughlin to sit on the reception committee for the world's fair. This appointment was a small part in Harrison's plan to create a centralized Democratic Party machine consisting of empowered ward committeemen and precinct captains that would answer to the local Democratic Party. The plan would not be accomplished until Anton Cermak came to power in Chicago politics in the 1920s.

In July, Harrison proposed the idea of building a new municipal water intake crib 7 miles (11 km) offshore of the city in Lake Michigan, and adjoining it to an artificial island built atop stilts anchored to the lakebottom. He envisioned such an island serving as "a summer resort...a pleasure garden, a picnicking ground."

During the exposition, Harrison entertained visiting dignitaries. On June 27, he hosted a breakfast at his personal residence for an official representative of the Spanish Monarchy. Harrison also delivered speeches during a number of themed days and other events of the exposition. At one event, he generated outrage by suggesting in a speech to a Canadian audience at a Dominion Day event that Americans would invite annexation of Canada to the United States. In August, during "British Empire Day" at the fair, he jokingly doubled-down on this by telling a British audience, by saying that Americans would invite an annexation of Great Britain alongside Canada. In the same remarks, however, he offered praise of the influence that the British Empire had, and its influence in the world's economy, and spoke in astonishment of the vast reaches of its empire.

On August 8, during an assembly of military surgeons of the United States National Guard, Harrison expressed his concern about unemployment in Chicago amid the Panic of 1893. He predicted that this situation, if not addressed with federal government funds, would inspire civil unrest in the city, remarking, "There are 200,000 people in Chicago today unemployed and almost destitute for money. If Congress does not give us plenty of money, we will have riots that will shake the country." Indeed, significant arrest with national reverberations did ultimately arise in Chicago, during the Pullman Strike in 1894.

== Assassination ==
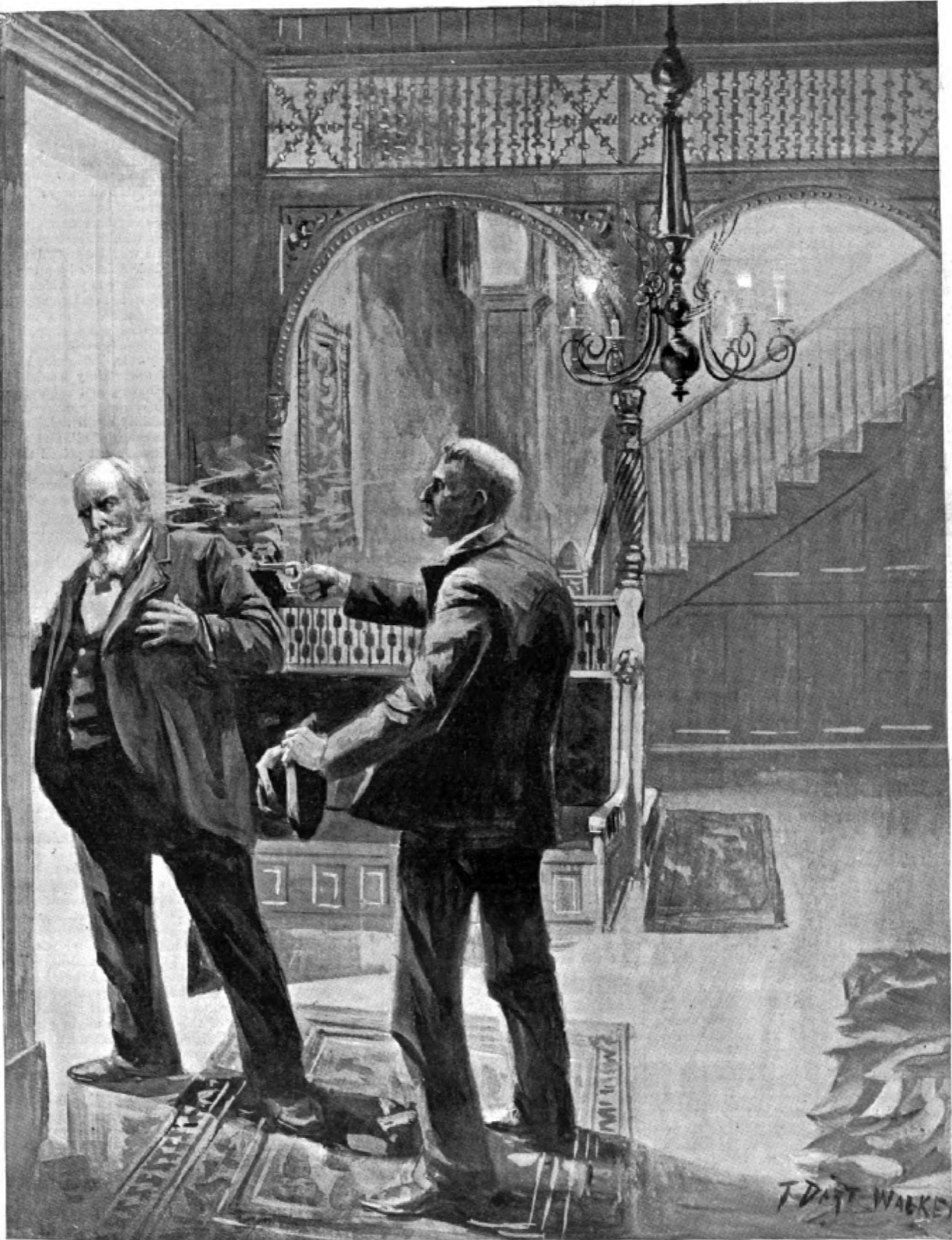
Illustration of Harrison's assassination

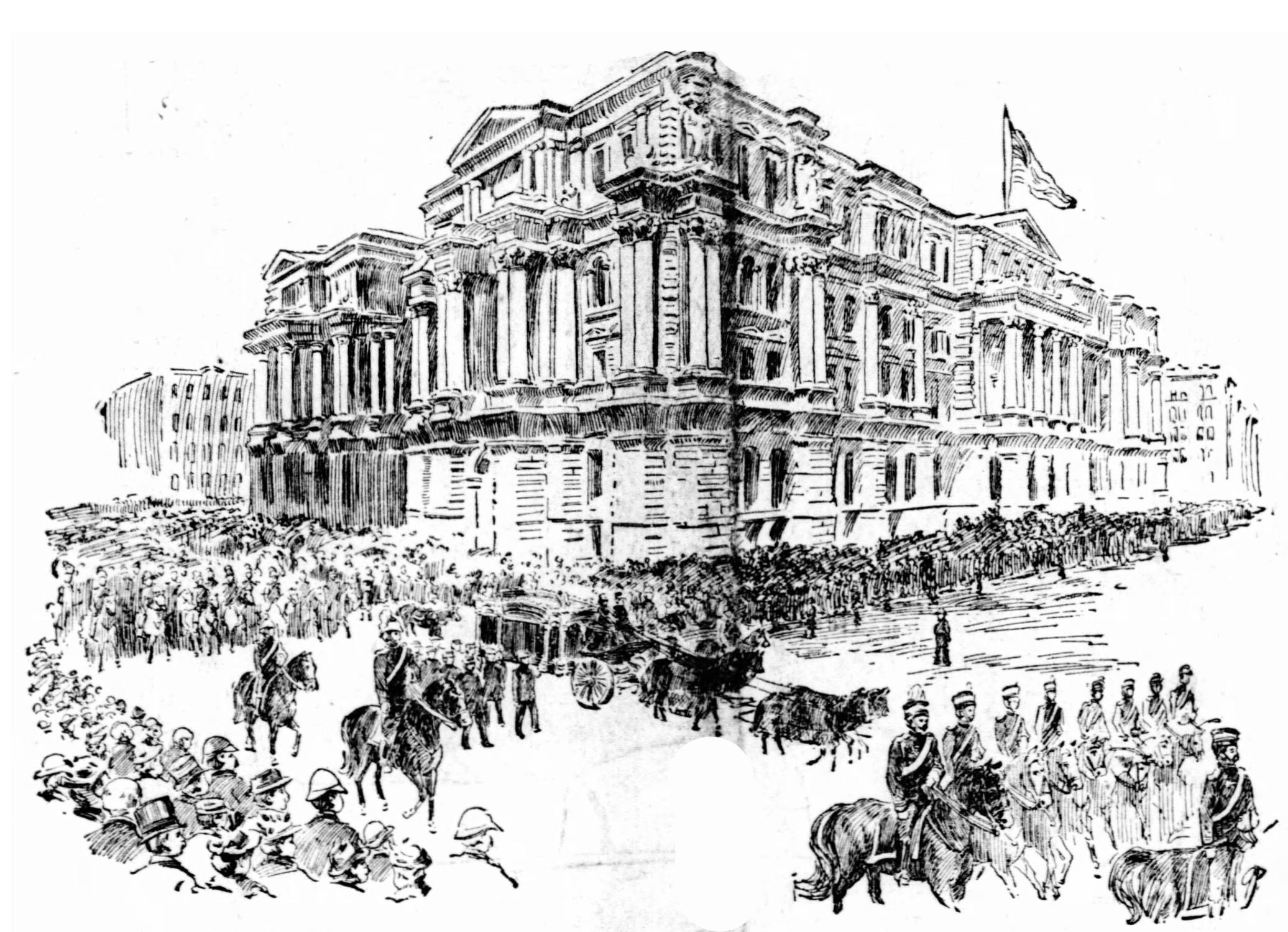
Illustration of Harrison's funeral procession departing Chicago's city hall building

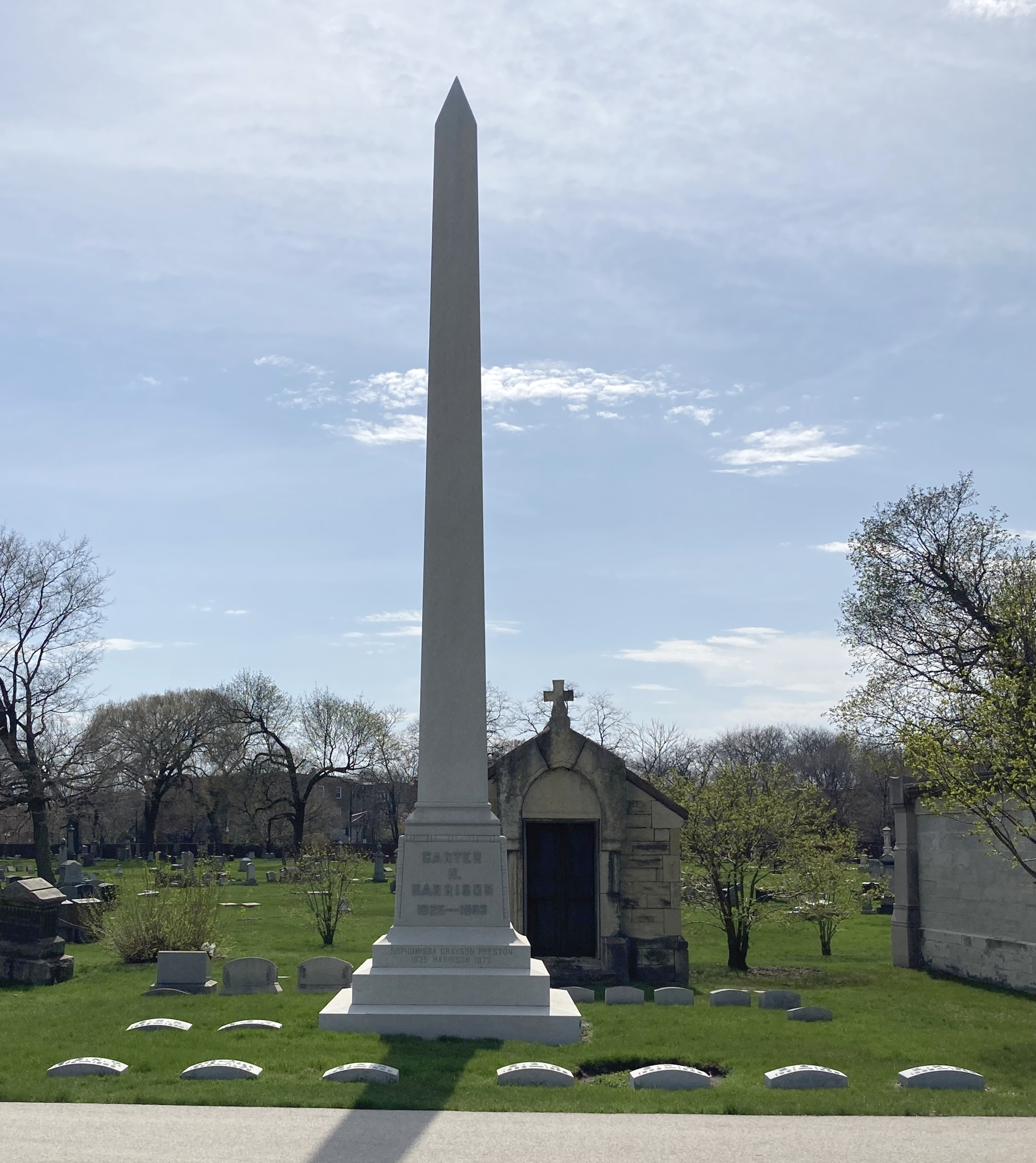
Harrison's tomb at Graceland Cemetery

On October 28, 1893, a few months into his fifth term and just two days before the close of the World's Columbian Exposition, Harrison was murdered in his home by Patrick Eugene Prendergast, an office-seeker who had supported Harrison's re-election under the idea that Harrison would reward him with an appointment to a post within his mayoral administration. Harrison was buried in Chicago's Graceland Cemetery. As part of his funeral services, Harrison lay in state in the City Hall. A celebration planned for the close of the Exposition was cancelled and replaced by a large public memorial service for Harrison. Prendergast was sentenced to death for the crime and hanged on July 13, 1894.

While Harrison died at a time when the elites, Protestants, and Republicans of all kinds greatly disliked him, he never lost his core supporters of labor unions, Catholics, and immigrants. He was Chicago's first mayor to be elected five times; eventually his son Carter Harrison IV was also elected mayor five times.

Harrison's career and assassination are closely associated with the World's Columbian Exposition, and are discussed at some length as a subplot to the two main stories (about the fair and serial killer H. H. Holmes) in Erik Larson's best-selling 2003 non-fiction book The Devil in the White City.

== Political views ==
Harrison was a populist Democrat. He was aligned with many causes that spoke to the working class in Chicago, being regarded as a voice for the concerns of "the great unwashed" of Chicago (i.e., members of the city's non-Protestant immigrant ethnic groups, who were often derided by many of the city's business elites).

In the 1880s (after the Haymarket Affair), Harrison spoke in disagreement with the news media's condemnation of American socialists. He argued that (contrary to media representations) socialists were not supportive of bomb throwers, and that socialists spoke to common concerns of the United States's "workers, thinkers, and writers". In his final political campaign (Chicago's 1893 mayoral election), Harrison campaigned on reforming Chicago's tax assessment system to equalize the tax burden (taxing the wealthier more). While he was aligned with the working class and fell into late political disfavor the city's business elite held for him, Harrison was himself a man of significant personal wealth, and remained poker buddies with numerous members of the city's business elite up until his death.

Harrison positioned himself as tolerant towards liquor consumption or gambling, and did not support government crackdowns on these behaviors. Rather than supporting blue laws, Harrison supported and encouraged the operation of saloons in ethnic neighborhoods, viewing them as functioning as community gathering-spaces out of which some services of further community benefit (such as post service) might also be operated.

Harrison saw Chicago's strength as being in its neighborhoods, and viewed it as being a city of neighborhoods.

Hailing from the Upland South and wed to a woman who hailed from the Deep South, during the American Civil War, Harrison had occasionally openly expressed sympathy towards the Confederate cause, leading him to be derided as a Copperhead. In a speech during "Great Britain Day" at the World's Fair, Harrison expressed wonder at the vast reaches of the British Empire, and opined that Britain's colonial rule over India was due to Britain's superiority, remarking, "India, with her 280 million of population has to acknowledge the supremacy of the intelligence and wealth of Great Britain, with her population of only 50 million."

== Personal life ==
=== Marriages and late engagement ===
On April 12, 1855, Harrison married his first wife, the former Sophie Preston. She hailed from the Preston family, a distinguished southern family. Harrison and his first wife, Sophie, had ten children together. Six of their children died either in infancy or early childhood.

Harrison became a widower after Sophie died in Europe in 1876. After being widowed, Harrison married Margarette (alternatively spelled "Margaret" or "Marguerite") E. Stearns in 1882. Stearns was a member of one of Chicago's earliest and wealthiest families, being the daughter of Chicago pioneer Marcus C. Stearns. He was widowed again when she died in 1887.

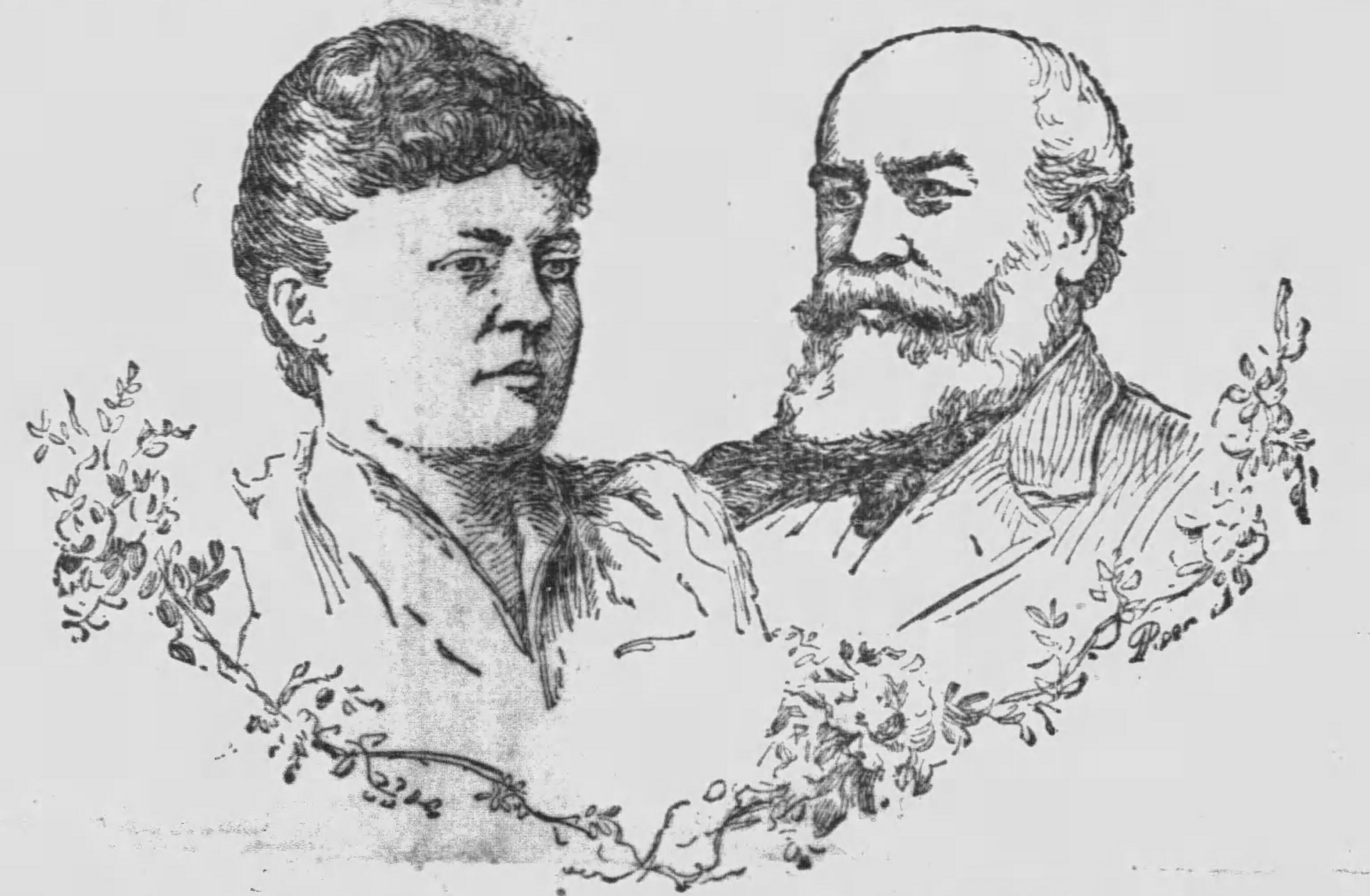
Illustration of Harrison (right) and Annie Howard, who he was engaged to marry at the time of his death

At the time of his assassination, Harrison was engaged to a young New Orleans heiress named Annie Howard, daughter of Louisiana State Lottery Company organizer Charles T. Howard, who had been worth an estimated $3,000,000, $700,000 of which she had inherited from him after his death. The Harrisons had originally sent out invitations for a November 7, 1893 wedding. However, realizing that November elections would be held on this day, Harrison rescheduled the wedding for November 12. Harrison was killed two weeks prior to his and Howard's planned wedding date.

=== Children ===
Harrison and his first wife, Sophie, had ten children together. Six of their children died either in infancy or early childhood.

The four children who survived to adulthood were Lina, Carter IV, William Preston, and Sophie.

Lina married Heaton Owsley, and became the step-mother of Jack Owsley (who became a noted American football player and coach, as well as a successful businessman). She and Owsley had a daughter who they also named Lina Harrison Owsley. This daughter of the Owsleys (granddaughter of Mayor Harrison) performed as an opera singer, studying opera under Hermann Devriès. In 1912, she married Paul Bartlett, a noted painter.

Carter IV served as mayor of Chicago from 1897 to 1905 and 1911 to 1915. He married Edith Ogden (who would garner note as the author of children's fairytale books) in 1887. Together, they had three children. Their firstborn died in infancy in 1889. Their other two children survived to adulthood: son Carter V (born in 1891) and daughter Edith II (born in 1896).

=== Other personal details ===
In September 1892, Harrison experienced what was described as a near-fatal accident in which he was thrown from a horse. He incurred injury, suffering a broken arm and significant bruising.

== Legacy ==
The Carter H. Harrison Medal is one of two medals "granted to sworn members of the fire and police departments who have performed distinguished acts of bravery in the protection of life or property", the other being the Lambert Tree Award.

A statue of Harrison is in Union Park on Chicago's Near West Side, about two blocks from the Ashland Avenue home where he lived and was murdered in 1893. It was erected in 1907. The plaque on the statue is a quote from Harrison's address to the World's Columbian Exposition, given hours before he died.

A 1994 survey of experts on Chicago politics saw Harrison ranked as one of the ten best mayors in the city's history (up to that time).

== Electoral history ==
=== Mayoral elections ===
1879

1879 Democratic city convention mayoral nominating convention balloting (simple-majority needed for nomination)
Candidate	Informal ballot	Formal ballot	Unanimous vote
Carter Harrison	38	51	68
Murray F. Tuley	16	17	0
George L. Dunlap	14	0	0
Total	68	68	68

1879 Chicago mayoral election
Party	Candidate	Votes	%
Democratic	Carter Harrison	25,685	44.28
Republican	Abner Wright	20,496	35.33
Socialist Labor	Ernst Schmidt	11,829	20.39
Total votes		58,010	100

1881

1881 Chicago mayoral election
Party	Candidate	Votes	%
Democratic	Carter Harrison (incumbent)	35,668	55.22
Republican	John M. Clark	27,925	43.23
Independent	Timothy O'Mara	764	1.18
Socialist Labor	George Schilling	240	0.37
Total votes		64,597	100

1883

1883 Chicago mayoral election
Party	Candidate	Votes	%
Democratic	Carter H. Harrison (incumbent)	41,226	57.11
Republican	Eugene Cary	30,963	42.89
Total votes		72,189	100

1885

1885 Chicago mayoral election
Party	Candidate	Votes	%
Democratic	Carter Harrison (incumbent)	43,352	50.09
Republican	Sidney Smith	42,977	49.66
Prohibition	William Bush	221	0.26
Total votes		86,550	100

1891

1891 Democratic city convention mayoral nominating convention balloting (simple-majority needed for nomination)
Candidate	Formal ballot votes
DeWitt Clinton Cregier (incumbent)	331
Carter Harrison	51
Total	383

1891 Chicago mayoral election
Party	Candidate	Votes	%
Republican	Hempstead Washburne	46,957	28.84
Democratic	DeWitt Clinton Cregier (incumbent)	46,558	28.59
Independent Democrat	Carter Harrison	42,931	26.36
Citizens	Elmer Washburn	24,027	14.75
Socialist Labor	Thomas J. Morgan	2,376	1.46
Total votes		162,849	100

1893

1893 Democratic city convention mayoral nominating convention balloting (simple-majority needed for nomination)
Candidate	Formal ballot votes
Carter Harrison	531
DeWitt Clinton Cregier	93
Washington Hesing	57
Total	681

1893 Chicago mayoral election
Party	Candidate	Votes	%
Democratic	Carter Harrison	114,237	54.03
Republican	Samuel W. Allerton	93,148	44.06
United Citizens	DeWitt Clinton Cregier	3,033	1.44
Socialist Labor	Henry Ehrenpreis	1,000	0.47
Total votes		211,418	100

=== U.S. House elections ===
1872

1872 U.S. House election in Illinois's 2nd congressional district
Party	Candidate	Votes	%
Republican	Jasper D. Ward	12,182	57.86
Democratic	Carter Harrison	8,873	42.14
Total votes		21,055	100

1874

1874 U.S. House election in Illinois's 2nd congressional district
Party	Candidate	Votes	%
Democratic	Carter Harrison	9,189	50.02
Republican	Jasper D. Ward (incumbent)	9,181	49.98
Total votes		18,370	100

1876

1876 U.S. House election in Illinois's 2nd congressional district
Party	Candidate	Votes	%
Democratic	Carter Harrison (incumbent)	14,732	50.89
Republican	George R. Davis	14,099	48.73
	S. F. Norton	118	0.41
Total votes		28,949	100

1878

1878 Democratic nominating convention for Illinois's 2nd congressional district (simple-majority needed for nomination)
Candidate	Informal ballot	Formal ballot	Unanimous vote
Miles Kehoe	45	44	78
Carter Harrison (incumbent)	33	34	0
Total	78	78	78

=== County Board of Commissioners election ===
1871 Cook County Board of Commissioners election preliminary returns as published in the Chicago Evening Post
Party	Candidate	Votes	%
Fireproof Ticket	John Herting	17,692	4.98
Fireproof Ticket	John Crawford	17,505	4.92
Fireproof Ticket	Carter Harrison III	17,489	4.92
Fireproof Ticket	Julius White	17,487	4.92
Fireproof Ticket	Charles Hitchcock	17,440	4.90
Fireproof Ticket	D. C. Skelly	17,326	4.87
Fireproof Ticket	Joseph Roelle	17,322	4.87
Fireproof Ticket	Thomas Lonergan	17,231	4.85
Fireproof Ticket	Joseph Harris	17,178	4.83
Fireproof Ticket	Marcus C. Stearns	17,025	4.79
Fireproof Ticket	Mancel Talcott	17,005	4.78
Fireproof Ticket	J. H. Pahlman	17,002	4.78
Fireproof Ticket	Christian Wahl	16,936	4.76
Fireproof Ticket	Samuel Ashton	16,797	4.72
Fireproof Ticket	John Jones	15,785	4.44
People's Ticket	____ Evans	6,865	1.93
People's Ticket	J.B. Young	6,788	1.91
People's Ticket	Charles Holland	6,787	1.91
People's Ticket	Charles Denehy	6,726	1.89
People's Ticket	James Lynch	6,858	1.93
People's Ticket	D. W. Clark	6,626	1.86
People's Ticket	Jacob Harth	6,496	1.83
People's Ticket	Philip Bohlander	6,253	1.76
People's Ticket	Fred Tesch	6,550	1.84
People's Ticket	John Cooly	6,544	1.84
People's Ticket	Thomas E. Courtney	6,444	1.81
People's Ticket	Edward Thompson	6,441	1.81
People's Ticket	William B. Gray	6,423	1.81
People's Ticket	Gustavus Troost	6,355	1.79
People's Ticket	H. D. King	6,204	1.74

== See also ==
- Samuel Gompers
- List of assassinated American politicians
- Casimir Zeglen

== Notes ==
U.S. House of Representatives
Preceded by Jasper D. Ward	Member of the U.S. House of Representatives from Illinois's 2nd congressional district 1875–1879	Succeeded by George R. Davis
Political offices
Preceded by Monroe Heath	Mayor of Chicago; 1879–1887	Succeeded by John A. Roche
Preceded by Hempstead Washburne	Mayor of Chicago; 1893	Succeeded by George Bell Swift; Acting
Party political offices
Preceded by DeWitt Clinton Cregier	Democratic nominee for Mayor of Chicago; 1893	Succeeded by John Patrick Hopkins
Preceded by Lyman Trumbull	Democratic nominee for Governor of Illinois; 1884	Succeeded by John Palmer
Preceded by Perry H. Smith	Democratic nominee for Mayor of Chicago; 1879, 1881, 1883, 1885	Succeeded by n/a
Preceded by Neill Donnelly	Democratic nominee for Illinois's 2nd congressional district 1872, 1874, 1876	Succeeded by Miles Kehoe
