= Maria Bertha Halpin =

American dressmaker (1836–1902)

Maria Bertha Halpin (born Maria Bertha Hovenden; 1836 – February 6, 1902), was an American dressmaker who became the center of a political scandal during the election of 1884 when she accused Grover Cleveland of sexual assault and fathering her illegitimate son, James E. King, Jr.

Born c. 1836 in Brooklyn to Robert Hovenden, a policeman, and Maria Hovenden, she married Frederick Halpin and mothered 2 children, Frederick Jr and Ada, and was widowed in 1865. In 1874, Maria met Grover Cleveland in Buffalo, NY and according to the Chicago Tribune a decade later: "Halpin said that Cleveland had pursued her relentlessly, and that she finally consented to join him for a meal at the Ocean Dining Hall & Oyster House. After dinner, Cleveland escorted her back to her boarding house. In an 1874 affidavit, Halpin strongly implied that Cleveland's entry into her room and the incident that transpired there was not consensual—he was forceful and violent, she alleged, and later promised to ruin her if she went to the authorities." 9 months later, Maria gave birth to a son, named Oscar Folsom Cleveland by Cleveland, after his best friend. At the time, Cleveland was the sheriff of Erie County and had Maria institutionalized at Providence Asylum to gain custody of the child, who he placed in an orphanage and was later adopted by a Buffalo doctor James King and went on to be a gynecologist himself.

Maria only stayed at Providence Asylum for five days after being given a clean bill of health and discharged. An asylum doctor later told the Tribune: "He says she was brought to the asylum without warrant or form of law. When he examined her he found that she was not insane, though she had been drinking. The managers of the asylum had no right to detain her, and she left in a few days—that is, as soon as she chose to after her terrible experience." Upon her release, Maria attempted to find her child, even employing a well-known Buffalo attorney, Milo. A. Whitney, who attempted to charge Cleveland with abduction and assault. With the help of her brother, Maria gave Whitney a signed letter from Cleveland. "They showed the attorney an agreement which stipulated that upon the payment of the sum of $500, Maria Halpin was to surrender her son, Oscar Folsom Cleveland, and make no further demands of any nature whatever upon his father."

A decade later, while Cleveland was running for president, on July 21, 1884, the Buffalo Evening Telegraph broke the story. Cleveland's friends attempted to paint Maria as a "loose woman" and told reporters that “Grover Cleveland was one of a party of three gentleman who shared her intimacy, and that the child whom he consented to father, belonged in truth, to a married member of this trio of libertines.” Cleveland's campaign not only claimed that Maria was intimate with several men, but suggested that the father of her child was Cleveland's married friend Oscar Folsom, and Cleveland, a bachelor, was merely saving his reputation by claiming paternity, none of which was substantiated by any evidence. Maria reluctantly came forward to repudiate the rumors to the Chicago Tribune on October 31, 1884.“I would gladly avoid further publicity of this terrible misfortune if I could do so without appearing to admit the foul and false statements concerning my character.” Maria defended her character and without much detail asserted that Cleveland fathered her child. “The circumstances under which my ruin was accomplished is too revolting on the part of Grover Cleveland to be made public,” she stated. But Maria never wavers in her certainty of Cleveland being the only possible father. “There is not and never was a doubt as to the paternity of our child.”

Anti-Cleveland chants from the Republicans of “Ma, Ma, where's my pa?” were soon met by the victorious Democratic response: “Headed to the White House, ha-ha-ha.” After Cleveland was elected president, Maria married tin store owner Wallace Hunt and died in New Rochelle in 1902, her last wish to not have a public burial.
