= 1879 Chicago mayoral election =

- April 1, 1879
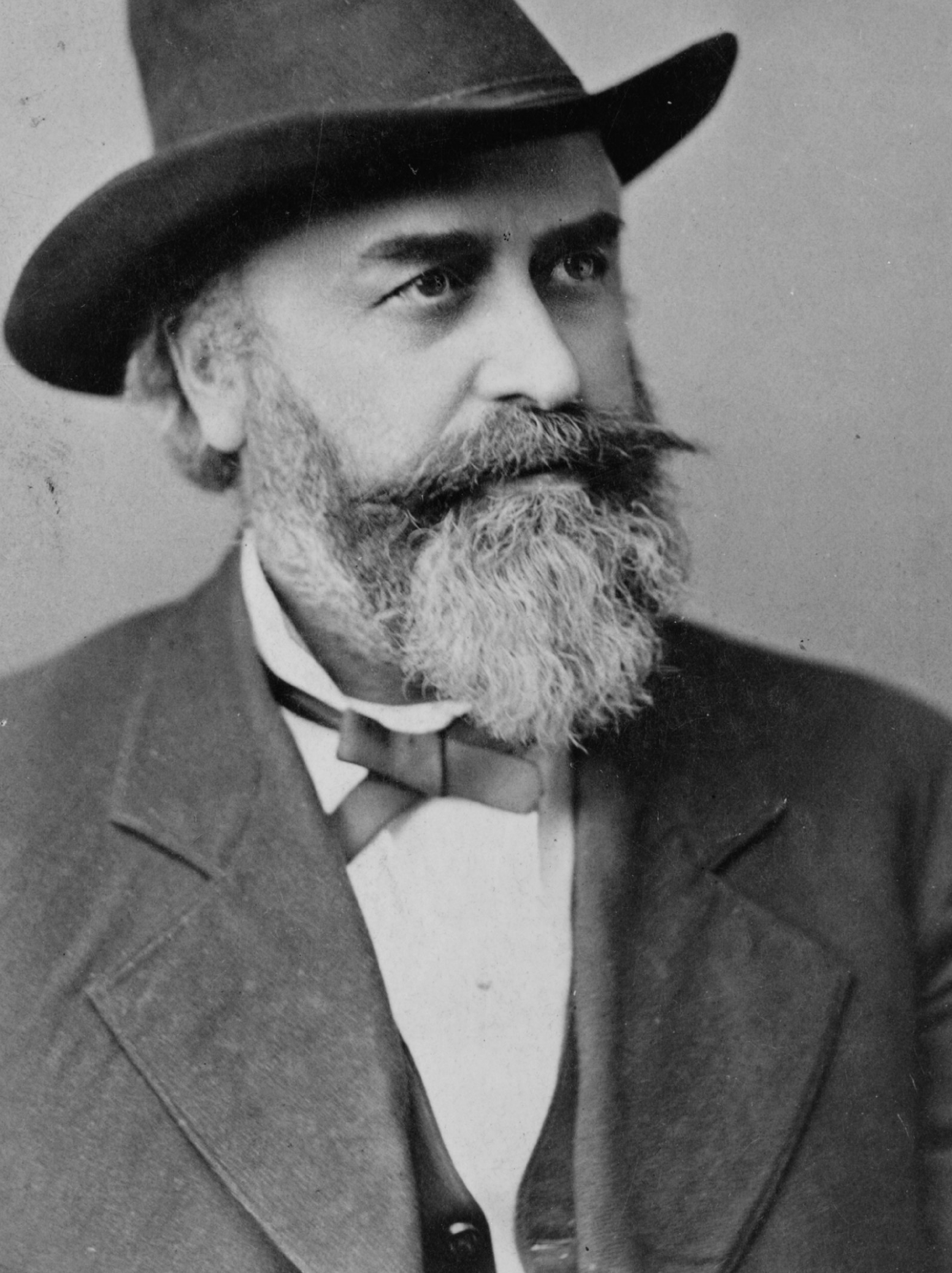

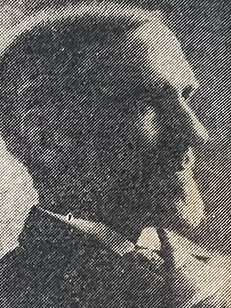

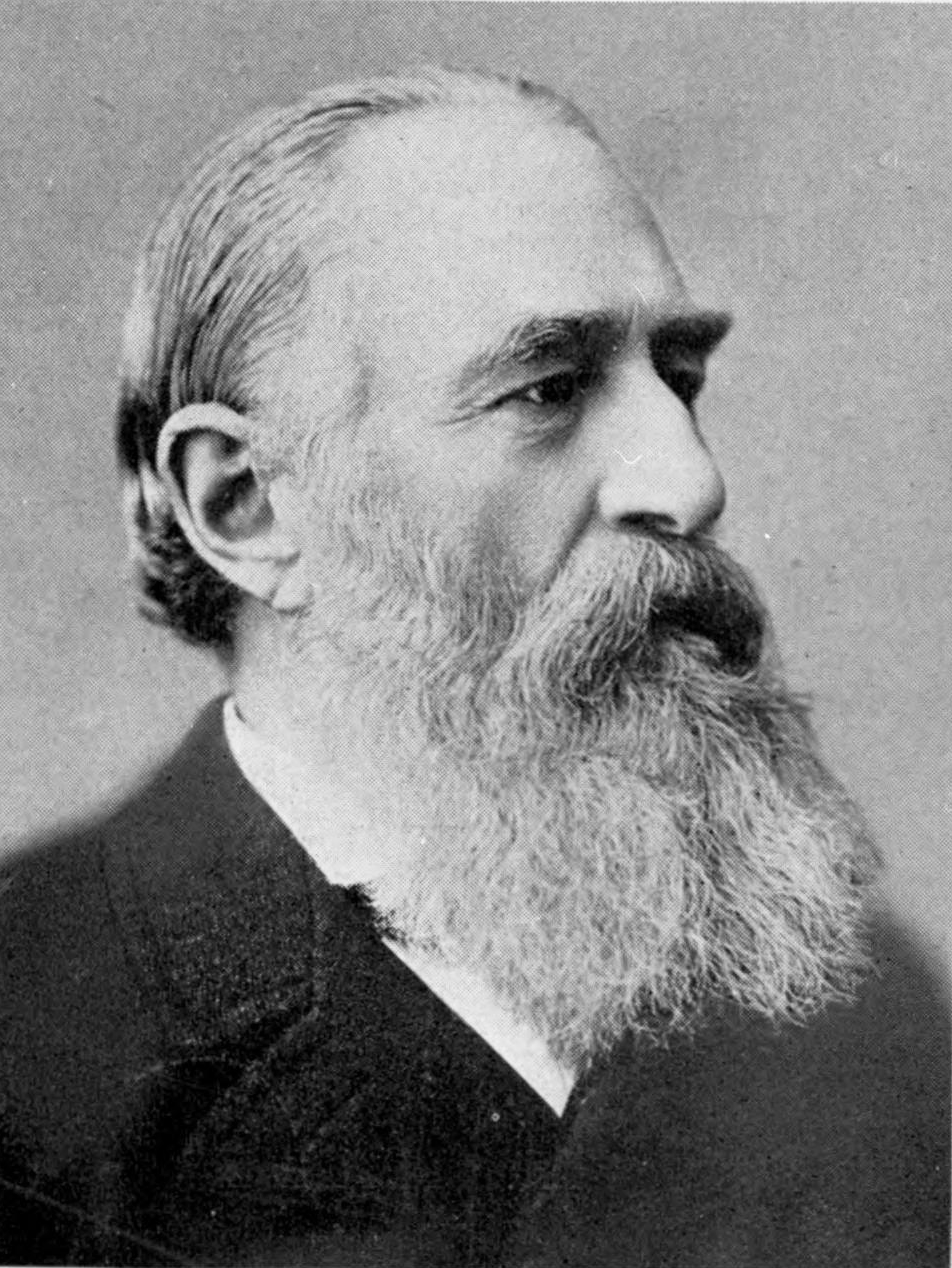
Nominee	Carter Harrison III	Abner Wright	Ernst Schmidt
Party	Democratic	Republican	Socialist Labor
Popular vote	25,685	20,496	11,829
Percentage	44.28%	35.33%	20.39%
Mayor before election
Monroe Heath
Republican
Elected mayor
Carter Harrison III
Democratic

In the Chicago mayoral election of 1879, Democrat Carter Harrison III defeated both Republican Abner Wright and socialist Ernst Schmidt in a three-way race. Harrison had a nearly nine point margin of victory.

Two-term incumbent Monroe Heath (who, at the time, was the longest-serving mayor in the city's history) did not run for reelection.

The election took place on April 1.

This was the first of four consecutive and six overall mayoral elections in which Harrison would be candidate; and was the first of four consecutive and five overall mayoral elections which he would win.

== Democratic nomination of Carter Harrison III ==
The Democratic Party nominated Carter Harrison III. Harrison's experience in national politics in congress appealed to conservative Democrats like Potter Palmer and Levi Leiter, while his liberal views on liquor consumption and gambling appealed to other leading local Democratic figures such as Michael C. McDonald.

Harrison was nominated at the Democratic City convention held at Uhlich's Hall on March 15. Also put forward as candidates at the convention were Murray F. Tuley and George L. Dunlap. Harrison received enough backing on an informal ballot, winning 18 votes. A motion was made after the informal ballot for it to be ratified as official, though this was quickly tabled. Dunlap withdrew his candidacy before the formal ballot, in which Harrison secured the nomination. Afterwards, a motion was passed by acclamation for Harrison's nomination to be considered unanimous.

Democratic city convention mayoral balloting (simple-majority needed for nomination)
Candidate	Informal ballot	Formal ballot	Unanimous vote
Carter Harrison III	38	51	68
Murray F. Tuley	16	17	0
George L. Dunlap	14	0	0
Total	68	68	68

Informal convention ballot votes by ward
	Harrison	Tuley	Dulap
1st	0	3	0
2nd	2	1	0
3rd	2	0	0
4th	0	0	3
5th	2	4	0
6th	2	1	1
7th	4	2	0
8th	7	0	0
9th	3	0	0
10th	2	1	0
11th	0	2	0
12th	1	1	0
13th	3	0	0
14th	5	0	0
15th	4	0	0
16th	1	1	2
17th	0	0	4
18th	0	0	4
Total	38	16	14

Formal ballot votes by ward
	Harrison	Tuley
1st	0	3
2nd	3	0
3rd	2	0
4th	0	3
5th	1	5
6th	4	0
7th	5	1
8th	7	0
9th	3	0
10th	3	0
11th	2	0
12th	1	1
13th	3	0
14th	5	0
15th	4	0
16th	2	2
17th	4	0
18th	2	2
Total	51	17

== Republican nomination of Abner Wright ==
After incumbent Republican Monroe Heath declined to seek reelection, the Republican Party nominated Abner Wright by acclamation at the party's city convention at Farwell Hall on March 11.

== Socialist Labor nomination of Ernest Schmidt ==
Having first approached Harrison unsuccessfully to run as their nominee, the Socialist Labor Party instead nominated Dr. Ernest Schmidt. Schmidt had a strong reputation of being "incorruptible". He had formerly been a Republican.

The party was coming off of several election successes in 1878, having seen the election of one of its nominees for Chicago alderman be elected in the Spring 1878 elections and three of its nominees for state legislature be elected in the Fall 1878 elections. Fresh off of these successes, the Socialist Labor Party fielded a full ticket of candidates for in municipal elections. Socialist.

== Greenback efforts to run a nominee ==
Harrison had originally also been approached by the Socialists and the Greenback Party to run on their tickets, before running as the Democratic Party nominee. At a March 8 meeting at Hershey Music Hall, the city's Greenbacks voted to offer Harrison their nomination, though he was non-committal as to whether he would accept if nominated by them. Some at the meeting opposed the nomination, due to Harrison not being a member of their party. Advocates of his nomination touted Harrison as an ally of the working class man. T. P. Jones (a rolling mill employee) was also placed into consideration in the convention roll call.

Greenback convention nomination vote (72 votes needed for a nominee)
Candidate	Votes	%
Carter Harrison III	90	60.81
T. P. Jones	51	34.46
??? Rafter	8	5.41
Murray F. Tuley	5	3.38
A. G. Schilling	1	0.68
??? Adair	1	0.68

Harrison's candidacy was ultimately supported by the Greenbacks. However, the South Town Greenbackers had first held their own convention on March 15, where they nominated Perry H. Smith (who was in attendance at the meeting).

== Campaign ==
Wright, a member of the Chicago Board of Trade, would be criticized for having been an inadequate candidate, lacking in energy, charisma, and appearing overly-calculated.

The Chicago Tribune sided against Harrison, arguing that his election would constitute "bummer restoration". Schmidt, helped to lead the Socialist Labor Party to more than double its vote share in the city's elections and see the election of an additional three aldermen.

The Socialist Labor Party had proved particularly adept at attracting German Republican and liberal voters away from the Republican Party. They also attracted strong support from the city's Bohemian population. After the municipal elections, some would blame the Socialist Labor Party for having a spoiler effect, having siphoned away would-be Republican supporters. The Illinois Staats-Zeitung wrote that, "The socialist have succeeded in deciding the election, to be sure not the advantage of their own candidates, but rather for the Democrats against the Republicans." Dr. Schmidt agreed that blame for the underperformance of the Republican ticket could be attributed to the Republican Party's loss of liberal German voters to the Socialist Labor Party. Nevertheless, others have cast doubt on the idea that Schmidt acted as a spoiler to Wright's campaign. It is in fact, quite possible that the socialist nominee had taken thousands of likely Democratic voters away from Harrison.

During the campaign, Harrison adopted a pet eagle, and would bring it with him on the stump. He would ride around town in a horse-drawn wagon, with his eagle, and with a banner attached to the wagon reading "Carter's Eagle and Victory". While derided by Republicans as a cheap campaign stunt, this levity was appreciated by many voters. This led to Harrison being affectionately nicknamed "the Eagle".

== Results ==
Harrison won the election. Harrison's victory was seen as being assisted by strong voter turnout. Harrison's victory ended what had been a period of Republican dominance in Chicago's mayoral elections.

1879 Chicago mayoral election
Party	Candidate	Votes	%
Democratic	Carter Harrison III	25,685	44.28
Republican	Abner Wright	20,496	35.33
Socialist Labor	Ernst Schmidt	11,829	20.39
Turnout		58,010	

== Allegations of fraud ==
Surprised by Wright's loss, Wright and other Republicans alleged electoral fraud. This echoed rhetoric that Chicago Republicans had espoused sowed at a mass meeting held at Farwell Hall on the eve of the election, which had speeches that focused heavily on concerns about electoral fraud, and frequently referenced the controversies of the 1876 United States presidential election.

At Wright's urging, the Chicago Tribune launched its own investigation into the election. The Tribune alleged that repeat voters had been transported across the city by Democrats to cast votes in various precincts. In addition, the Chicago Inter Ocean alleged that non-residents and non-citizens had cast votes. Other newspapers such as the Chicago Daily News published editorials criticizing Republicans for making these allegations.

Outgoing Republican mayor Heath dismissed allegations of fraud. Ultimately, Wright withdrew his allegations that fraud had taken pace.
