= Miles Kehoe =

Irish-American politician

Miles J. Kehoe

Member of the Illinois Senate from the 3rd district
- In office 1873 – 1880
- Preceded by: William B. Anderson
- Succeeded by: Sylvester Artley

Personal details
- Born: August 15, 1848 County Carlow, Ireland
- Died: February 16, 1916 (aged 67) Chicago, Illinois
- Party: Democratic
- Profession: bricklayer, teamster, lawyer

Miles J. Kehoe (August 15, 1848 – February 16, 1916) was an Irish-American politician.

== Biography ==
Miles Kehoe was born on August 15, 1848, in County Carlow, Ireland, to Arthur and Winnifred (Byrne) Kehoe. The family emigrated to Chicago the following year. Kehoe attended the Foster School, then worked in a brickyard, later joining his father in a teaming business. Kehoe was elected to the Illinois Senate for the 28th Illinois General Assembly in 1872, representing the 3rd district. He was the youngest member ever elected to the state senate at the time.

Kehoe remained in the senate until 1880, serving four years at the chairman of the Committee on Municipalities. In 1878, he was nominated by the Democrats to represent Illinois's 2nd congressional district over incumbent Carter Harrison III, but was defeated in the general election by Republican George R. Davis. Kehoe worked as a law clerk from 1880 to 1886, and was admitted to the bar in 1892. He served as a delegate to the 1892 Republican National Convention, supporting President Benjamin Harrison. In 1895, he was named a Police Magistrate and Justice of the Peace.

Miles Kehoe married Kate Murphy in 1875. His son Arthur T. also entered the law profession. Kehoe was a member of the Ancient Order of United Workmen.
