= Jasper D. Ward =

American politician (1829–1902)

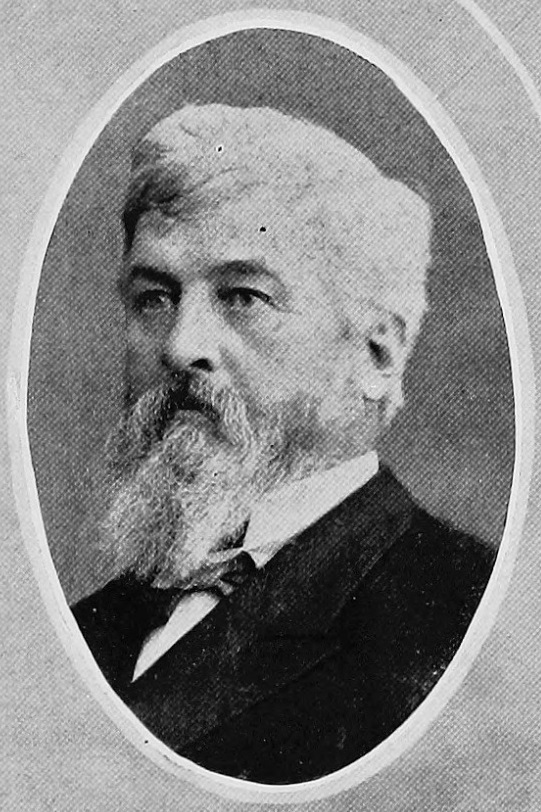
- From 1916's Olden Times in Colorado

Member of the U.S. House of Representatives from Illinois's 2nd district
- In office March 4, 1873 – March 3, 1875
- Preceded by: John F. Farnsworth
- Succeeded by: Carter Harrison Sr.

Personal details
- Born: February 1, 1829 Java, New York, U.S.
- Died: August 6, 1902 (aged 73) Denver, Colorado, U.S.
- Party: Republican

Jasper Delos Ward (February 1, 1829 – August 6, 1902) was a U.S. representative from Illinois.

Born in Java, Wyoming County, New York, Ward attended Allegheny College, Meadville, Pennsylvania, in 1849 and 1850. He studied law. He was admitted to the bar in 1852 and commenced practice in Chicago, Illinois. He served as a member of the board of aldermen of Chicago in 1855, 1856, 1859, and 1860. During the American Civil War he enlisted in the Western Engineer Regiment in 1861 and served for about eight months. He served as a member of the Illinois Senate 1862–1870.

Ward was elected as a Republican to the Forty-third Congress (March 4, 1873 – March 3, 1875). He was an unsuccessful candidate for reelection in 1874 to the Forty-fourth Congress. He was United States Attorney for the northern district of Illinois 1875–1877. He moved to Colorado in 1877 and settled in Leadville. He was appointed by Governor Frederick Walker Pitkin as judge of the fifth judicial district of Colorado and served from March 5, 1881, to January 3, 1882, declining to be a candidate for election to the same office. He moved to Denver, and resumed the practice of law. He died on August 6, 1902, and was interred in Fairmount Cemetery in Denver.

U.S. House of Representatives
Preceded by John F. Farnsworth	Member of the U.S. House of Representatives from Illinois's 2nd congressional district 1873-1875	Succeeded by Carter H. Harrison
