= Sidney Smith (Illinois judge) =

- sketch of Smith, circa 1885

Judge of the Superior Court of Cook County
- In office December 1, 1879 – December 1, 1885
- Preceded by: Samuel M. Moore
- Succeeded by: Gwynn Garnett

Personal details
- Born: May 12, 1829 Washington County, New York, U.S.
- Died: October 6, 1898 (age 69) Metropole Hotel in Chicago, Illinois, U.S.
- Party: Republican
- Profession: lawyer

Sidney Smith was an American judge, lawyer, and politician who served as judge of the Superior Court of Cook County, and was the Republican nominee in the 1885 Chicago mayoral election (which he narrowly lost to incumbent Carter Harrison III).

Smith was a prominent attorney, reputed to be one of the best trial lawyers in Chicago.

== Early life ==
Smith was born May 12, 1829, in Washington County, New York.

== Early legal career ==
When Smith was twenty years old, he completed his formal education, and began studying law with the New York City firm Church & Davis. After to years, he was admitted to the bar at Albion, New York.

Smith arrived in Chicago in either 1855 or 1856. He remained a Chicago resident for the remainder of his life. A few months after arriving in Chicago, he became associated with Grant Goodrich and W. W. Farwell, with whom he formed the firm Goodrich, Farwell, & Smith. For a long time, this firm was regarded as one of the strongest legal partnerships in the northwestern United States. The firm dissolved in 1870, after Farwell left to become a judge of the Cook County Circuit Court. Initially it became Goodrich & Smith, but later dissolved completely.

In 1877, Smith served as a defense attorney for several members of the Cook County Board of Commissioners who were facing charges of fraud and embezzlement.

In 1872, Smith ran his first political campaign. He unsuccessfully ran for the Illinois's 1st congressional district seat in the U.S. House of Representatives, losing against Bernard G. Caulfield.

== Judge of the Cook County Superior Court ==
Smith was elected to the Cook County Superior Court in November 1879. He was sworn in on December 1, succeeding Samuel M. Moore. He served until December 1, 1885, when he declined to seek another term was succeeded by Gwynn Garnett. Smith was regarded to be a prominent member of the bench, and was also prominent in politics. Smith had a reputation for being a scholarly judge.

== 1885 Chicago mayoral campaign ==
Smith was the Republican nominee for mayor of Chicago in 1885. He had been encouraged by others to run. Before being nominated at the city's Republican convention, Smith had declared that he would not actively seek to run and would only run if nominated by the Republican Party's convention. After other contenders withdrew from consideration ahead of the city nominating convention, Smith emerged as a likely consensus nominee of the party.

Smith lost, with a result so narrow that many of his supporters alleged electoral fraud had been a decisive factor. The Republican camp filed litigation in county court alleging that 360 illegal votes were cast for Harrison and 324 votes legally cast for Smith had not been counted, enough votes to sway the election.

== Later legal career ==
Smith remained engaged in the legal profession, remaining a prominent member of the Cook County bar.

After leaving his judgeship, Smith accepted a position as the attorney of the Chicago Board of Trade, a job which he kept until 1895. Smith also became a senior member of the firm Smith, Muhlke & Murdock, which also included John H. Muhlke as a title partner. He continued to hold a reputation as one of the best trial attorneys in Chicago.

In 1900, Smith declined an offer to be nominated as a candidate for the Illinois Supreme Court.

Smith was involved in the divorce lawsuit of Chicago socialist Leslie Carter, a legal matter which was well-covered in society pages.

Smith tried his final case two years before his death.

== Personal life and death ==
Smith held a large fortune, and was estimated to have an estate worth millions by the end of his life. His fortune notably included four blocks of valuable residential real estate in Chicago on Indiana Avenue between Twenty Sixth Street and Thirtieth Street.

Smith was regarded to be religiously devout. He and his wife, Nellie, had several children together.

Eighteen months before his death, Smith suffered a stroke that left him with paralysis, and withdrew largely from public engagements. Smith died October 6, 1898, at the age of 69 at his apartment in the Metropole Hotel. Smith had been in weak health for the last several years of his life.

Party political offices
Preceded by John Blake Rice	Republican nominee for Illinois's 1st congressional district 1872	Succeeded by n/a
Preceded by Eugene Cary	Republican nominee for Mayor of Chicago; 1885	Succeeded by John A. Roche
