= John Trimble (politician) =

American politician (1812–1884)

Member of the U.S. House of Representatives from Tennessee's 5th district
- In office March 4, 1867 – March 3, 1869
- Preceded by: William B. Campbell
- Succeeded by: William F. Prosser

United States Attorney for the Middle District of Tennessee
- In office April 1862 – August 1864

Member of the Tennessee Senate
- In office April 3, 1865 – March 1867
- Preceded by: re-formed
- Succeeded by: Eugene Cary
- Constituency: 18th
- In office October 3, 1859 – February 4, 1861
- Preceded by: Andrew F. Goff
- Succeeded by: George W. Barrow
- In office October 6, 1845 – February 2, 1846
- Preceded by: Thomas R. Jennings
- Succeeded by: Return J. Meigs III

Member of the Tennessee House of Representatives
- In office 1843–1844

Personal details
- Born: February 7, 1812 Roane County, Tennessee, U.S.
- Died: February 23, 1884 (aged 72) Nashville, Tennessee, U.S.
- Party: Republican
- Education: University of Nashville
- Profession: lawyer; politician

John Trimble (February 7, 1812 – February 23, 1884) was an American politician and a member of the United States House of Representatives for Tennessee's 5th congressional district from 1867 to 1869.

== Biography ==
Trimble was born in Roane County, Tennessee son of James and Leticia B. Trimble, Trimble pursued classical studies under a private tutor and at the University of Nashville. He studied law and was admitted to the bar.

== Career ==
After beginning his practice in Nashville, Tennessee, he became Tennessee Attorney General in 1836, and served until 1842. He served as member of the Tennessee House of Representatives in 1843 and 1844, and in the Tennessee Senate in 1845 and 1846, and in 1859 and 1861. A Southern Unionist, he resigned when the state seceded. He served as a United States Attorney from April 1862 until August 1864, when he resigned. He again served in the state senate from 1865 to 1867.

Elected as a Republican to the Fortieth Congress, he served from March 4, 1867 to March 3, 1869.

== Death ==
Trimble died in Nashville, Tennessee, on February 23, 1884 (age about 72 years). The location at which he is interred is Mount Olivet Cemetery.

U.S. House of Representatives
Preceded by William B. Campbell	Member of the U.S. House of Representatives from Tennessee's 5th congressional district 1867–1869	Succeeded by William F. Prosser
