= 1881 Chicago mayoral election =

- April 5, 1881
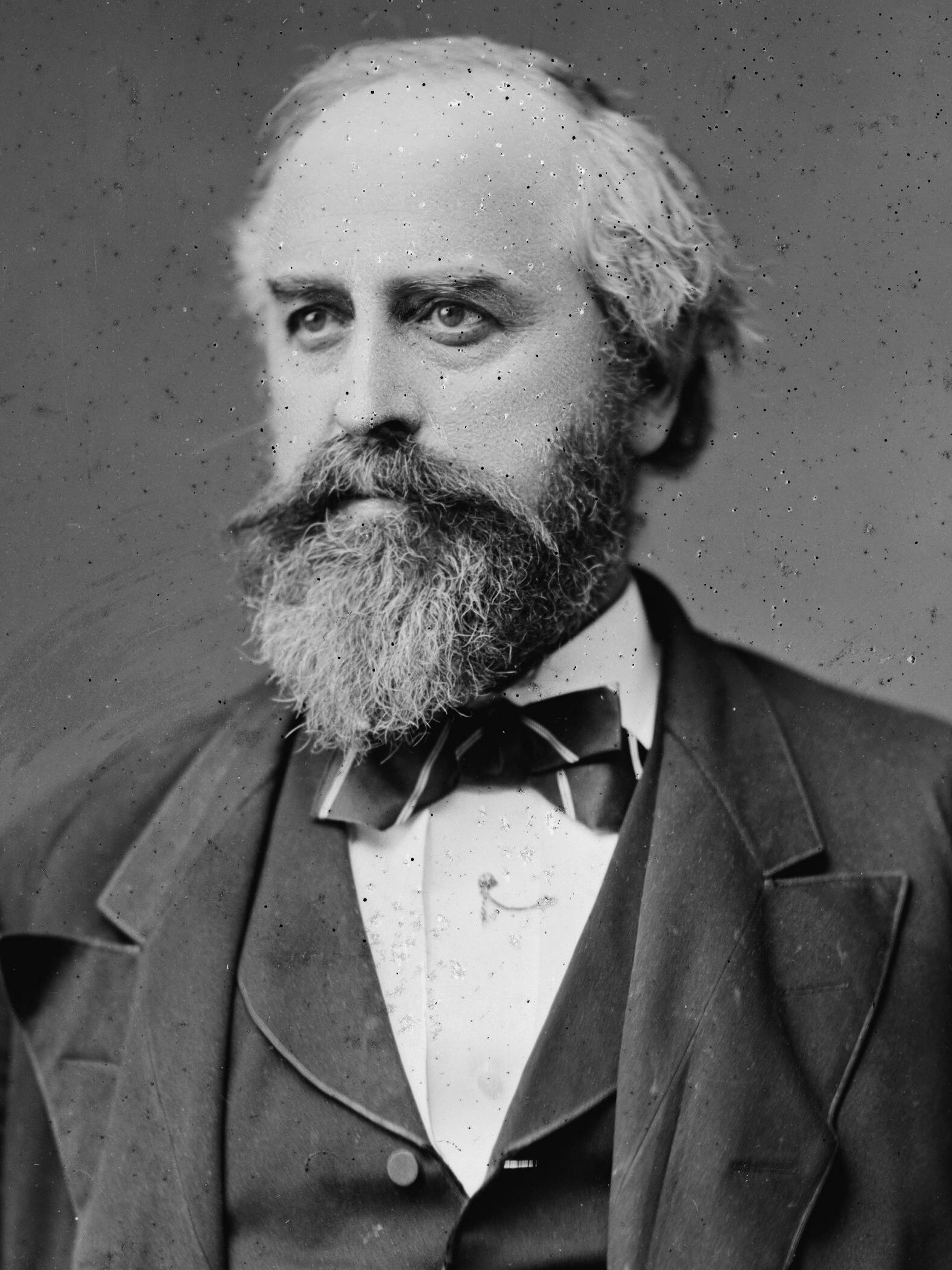

| Nominee | Carter Harrison III | John M. Clark |
| Party | Democratic | Republican |
| Popular vote | 35,668 | 27,925 |
| Percentage | 55.22% | 43.23% |
Mayor before election
Carter Harrison III
Democratic
Elected mayor
Carter Harrison III
Democratic

The Chicago mayoral election of 1881 was held on April 5, saw the incumbent mayor, Democrat Carter Harrison III, defeat Republican Candidate John M. Clark. Harrison won a majority of the vote with a nearly twelve point margin of victory.

The election took place on April 5. Unlike in the previous mayoral election, the Socialist Labor Party's nominee did not have much of an impact.

Harrison's Republican opponent, John M. Clark was a Chicago alderman that had been elected to the Chicago City Council two years earlier.

Harrison's sizable victory came despite the fact that Republicans had carried the city in the 1880 elections by a similar vote margin.

== Democratic nomination of Harrison ==
The Democratic Party re-nominated incumbent mayor Carter Harrison III

== Republican nomination of Clark ==
At its March 22 convention, the Republican Party nominated John M. Clark. Clark was an incumbent member of the Chicago Common Council (city council). The convention's nomination saw four names placed into consideration. None of the four men had actively sought the nomination for themself. Clark was nominated largely because convention delegates believed he was the most likely of the four men to accept their nomination. Of the considered candidates, he had strong support among the city party rank-and-file as well as its wealthy business elite. Clark was understood to be an ally of business interests.

== Other candidates ==
Timothy O'Mara ran as an independent candidate, and George Schilling ran as the nominee of the Socialist Labor Party.

== Results ==
1881 Chicago mayoral election
| Party | Candidate | Votes | % |
|---|---|---|---|
| Democratic | Carter H. Harrison III (incumbent) | 35,668 | 55.22 |
| Republican | John M. Clark | 27,925 | 43.23 |
| Independent | Timothy O'Mara | 764 | 1.18 |
| Socialist Labor | George Schilling | 240 | 0.37 |
| Turnout | | 64,597 | |
