= 1884 Illinois gubernatorial election =

- November 4, 1884
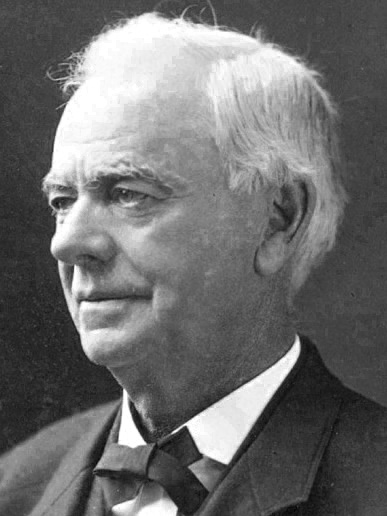

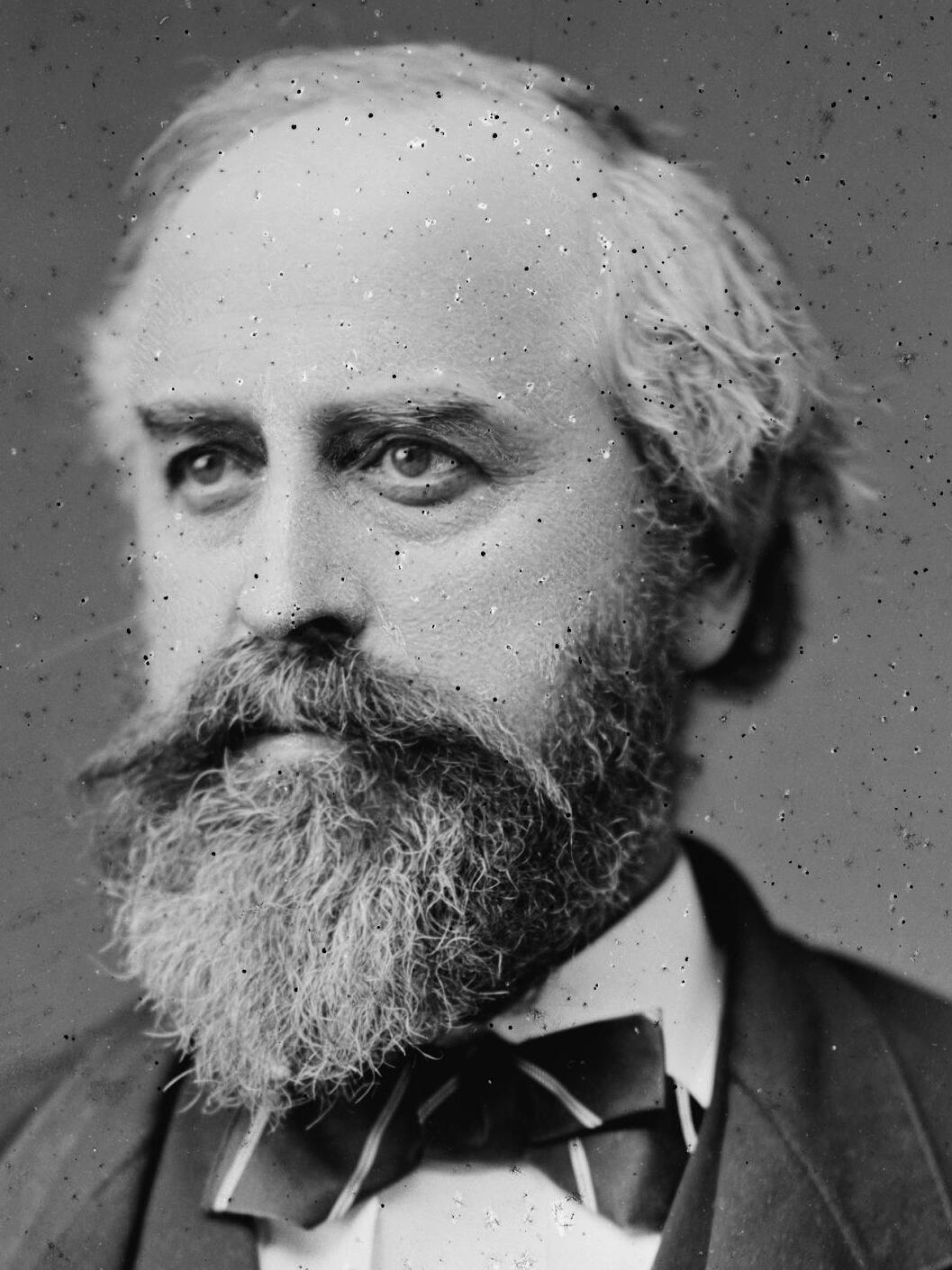
Nominee	Richard J. Oglesby	Carter Harrison Sr.
Party	Republican	Democratic
Popular vote	334,234	319,635
Percentage	49.63%	47.47%
- County results Oglesby: 40–50% 50–60% 60–70% 70–80% Harrison: 40–50% 50–60% 60–70%
Governor before election
John Marshall Hamilton
Republican
Elected Governor
Richard J. Oglesby
Republican

The 1884 Illinois gubernatorial election was held on November 4, 1884. Republican Richard J. Oglesby defeated Democratic Chicago mayor Carter Harrison Sr. with 49.63 percent of the vote. Oglesby's victory was the eighth consecutive victory for the Republican Party since 1856.

== General election ==
=== Candidates ===
- Jesse Harper, former national chair of the Greenback Party and nominee for U.S. representative in 1878 (Greenback)
- Carter Harrison Sr., mayor of Chicago (Democratic)
- James Bartlett Hobbs (Prohibition)
- Richard J. Oglesby, former governor and former U.S. senator (Republican)

=== Results ===
Illinois gubernatorial election, 1884
Party	Candidate	Votes	%	±%
Republican	Richard J. Oglesby	334,234	49.63%	
Democratic	Carter Harrison Sr.	319,635	47.47%	
Prohibition	James Bartlett Hobbs	10,905	1.62%	
Greenback	Jesse Harper	8,605	1.28%	
Scattering		10	0.00%	
Majority		14,599	2.16%	
Turnout		673,389		
Republican hold		Swing		

== See also ==
- 1884 Illinois lieutenant gubernatorial election

== Bibliography ==
- Vote of the State of Illinois at the General Election held November 4, 1884. Springfield, Ill.: H. W. Rokker, Printer and Binder. 1885.
- Glashan, Roy R. (1979). American Governors and Gubernatorial Elections, 1775-1978. Meckler Books. ISBN 0-930466-17-9.
