= Eugene Cary =

American judge and politician (1835–1904)

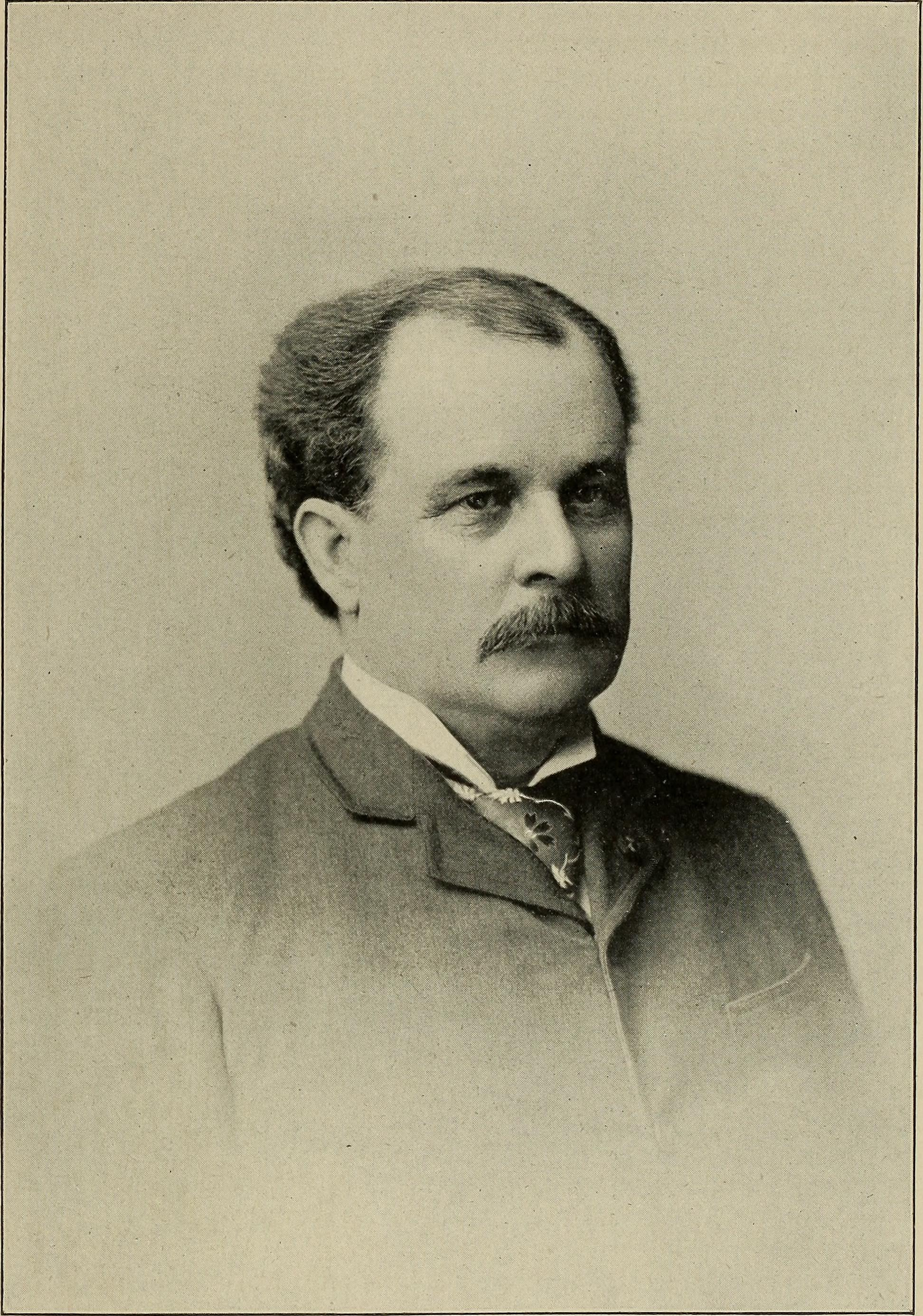
- portrait of Cary

Member of the Chicago City Council from the 3rd ward
- In office 1877–1879 Serving with John L. Thompson (1877–78); O.B. Phelps (1878–79)
- Preceded by: William Aldrich
- Succeeded by: John M. Clark

Judge of the Tennessee 1st Circuit
- In office 1867–1870 (Note: term ended after judicial overhaul following ratification of 1870 Tennessee Constitution)

Member of the Tennessee Senate from the 18th district
- In office 1867–1868
- Preceded by: John Trimble
- Succeeded by: Adrian V. S. Lindsley

Sheboygan County Judge
- In office 1857–~1861

Sheboygan City Attorney
- In office 1857

Personal details
- Born: February 20, 1835 Boston, New York, U.S.
- Died: March 22, 1904 (aged 69) St. Louis, Missouri, U.S.
- Party: Republican
- Spouse: Martha Rowe (m. 1858)
- Profession: lawyer, insurance agent/executive

Military service
- Allegiance: United States
- Branch/service: Union Army
- Rank: Captain
- Unit: H Company of the 1st Wisconsin Infantry Regiment; XIV corps
- Battles/wars: American Civil War

Eugene Cary (February 20, 1835–March 22, 1904) was an American judge, lawyer, insurance executive, and politician who was active in Chicago, Illinois; Nashville, Tennessee; Sheboygan County, Wisconsin; and Erie County, New York.

Cary was raised in Erie County, New York. He studied law, first in the city of Sheboygan, Wisconsin, under David Taylor; and later in Buffalo, New York, under Nathan K. Hall. After finishing his legal studies, he settled again in Sheboygan, where he held office first as city attorney and later as county judge. During his tenure as county judge, he also began working in the insurance industry as a local agent for Aetna and The Hartford. During the American Civil War, Cary served in the Union army. After the war, he relocated to Nashville, where he worked both in law and the insurance industry (for Aetna). In Nashville, Cary served one term as a member of the Tennessee Senate, and also served as an elected circuit court judge.

In 1871, after the Great Chicago Fire, Cary moved to Chicago to work as the general agent for the Imperial Insurance Company. He later worked as the general manager of the Western United States operations of the German-American Insurance Company. From 1877 to 1879, Cary served a single term on the Chicago City Council as an alderman from the 3rd ward. Cary unsuccessfully ran for mayor of Chicago in 1883 as the nominee of the city's Republican Party, losing to incumbent mayor Carter Harrison III (a Democrat). He continued working in the insurance industry until his death in 1904, by which time he was regarded to be the "dean" among all insurance agents in the Western United States.

== Early life ==
Cary was born February 20, 1835, in Boston, New York. Among Cary's ancestry were some of the original settlers of the Plymouth Colony. Cary remained in Erie County, New York until he was eighteen years old. In those early years, he worked on his father's farm, and was educated in the local country district school. At the age of sixteen, he entered the profession of teaching in order to secure himself opportunities for a fuller education, using he free time to begin reading law.

== Life and career in Sheboygan and Buffalo ==
At the age of 18, Cary relocated westward to the city of Sheboygan, Wisconsin, where he initially worked as a school teacher and studied law in the legal office of David Taylor. Cary briefly relocated back to Erie County, New York, in order to study law in Buffalo under James Sheldon and Nathan K. Hall, the latter being a name partner at the firm of Fillmore, Haven & Hall. Millard Fillmore, who later served as president of the United States, was also a name partner of the firm.

After finishing those legal studies in Buffalo, Cary returned to Sheboygan where he began practicing law at the age of 21. Very soon after returning to Sheboygan, he was elected at the age of 22 to serve a term as city attorney. After this, he was appointed the county judge of Sheboygan County in 1857 (at the age of 22). While serving as a judge in 1857, he also entered the insurance industry by working as a local agent for Aetna and the Hartford Insurance Company.

Cary married Martha Rowe in 1858.

== Civil War ==
After the start of the American Civil War, Cary became a captain in the 1st Wisconsin Infantry Regiment, leading Sheboygan's H Company. He personally raised the H company, and led it to was warfront. He enlisted on September 16, 1861, was made second lieutenant on September 8, was promoted to first lieutenant on October 8, and was further promoted to captain on October 11. He later resigned as captain of the company on October 27, 1863.

For most of his civil war service, Cary was assigned as a judge advocate (military lawyer) for the first division of the XIV corps, being placed on the staff of generals Lovell Rousseau and Absalom Baird.

== Life and career in Tennessee ==
After the Civil War, Cary moved to Nashville, Tennessee, practicing law in that state. He also continued working in the insurance agency while in Tennessee, being employed there as the state agent of Aetna.

=== Tennessee State Senate and circuit court judgeship ===
Cary served as single elected term in the Tennessee Senate representing the 18th Senate district during the first session of the 35th Tennessee General Assembly. He succeeded John Trimble in holding the seat, which represented portions of Davidson County. After vacating his seat, he was succeeded in the second session of the 35th General Assembly by Adrian V. S. Lindsley.

Cary was urged by leading attorneys of the area, including former governor Neill S. Brown and incumbent governor Henry S. Foote, to run for a circuit judgeship. He was elected in 1867, and served until a change to the state constitution ended his term.

== Life and career in Chicago ==
In October 1871, Cary moved to Chicago to take a job with the Imperial Insurance Company, having been asked to work as the company's general agent in the aftermath of the Great Chicago Fire. In this role, he managed the company's Western Department. Two years later, Cary took a new job in Chicago as the general manager of the Western United States operations of the German-American Insurance Company, a company that was nationally headquartered in New York City. He held this latter job for more than three decades, until his unexpected death in 1904. Cary was highly prominent in the fire insurance industry. By the end of his life, Cary was one of the most well-known insurance industry professionals in the Western United States, and had become regarded the "dean" among Western United States insurance agents. At the time of his death, he was the presiding officer of the Association of Insurance Agents of Chicago. He also served two terms as president of the Western Union, a prominent insurance industry organization.

Cary served a single term as commander of the Illinois Commandery of the Loyal Legion, and a single term as president of the Commercial Club of Chicago. In January 1900, members of the Union League Club of Chicago elected Cary its president.

=== Chicago politics ===
Cary was a staunch Republican, and was prominent in Illinois Republican Party politics.

In 1877, Cary was away from Chicago on a trip to California, city Republicans nominated Cary to run for the Chicago City Council as an alderman from the third ward. He won election, running unopposed and receiving the more votes than had ever before been cast for an aldermanic candidate in that ward. He served a single term, ending in 1879.

Cary was the Republican nominee for mayor of Chicago in 1883. After being nominated, Cary actively campaigned for the office. He lost to incumbent mayor Carter Harrison II, a Democrat. Multiple publications indicate a widespread belief existed that Cary had received a majority of votes lawfully cast, but votes from a ballot box in at least one precinct favoring Cary were not included in the count certified by election officials.

== Death ==
Cary died unexpectedly while in St. Louis, after giving a speech at a banquet that World's Fair officials were hosting for insurance industry agents. He died soon after returning to his seat, besides the seat of Louisiana Purchase Exposition President David R. Francis. The reported cause of his death was apoplexy.

== Notes ==
Party political offices
Preceded by John M. Clark	Republican nominee for Mayor of Chicago; 1883	Succeeded by Sidney Smith
