= 1883 Chicago mayoral election =

- April 3, 1883
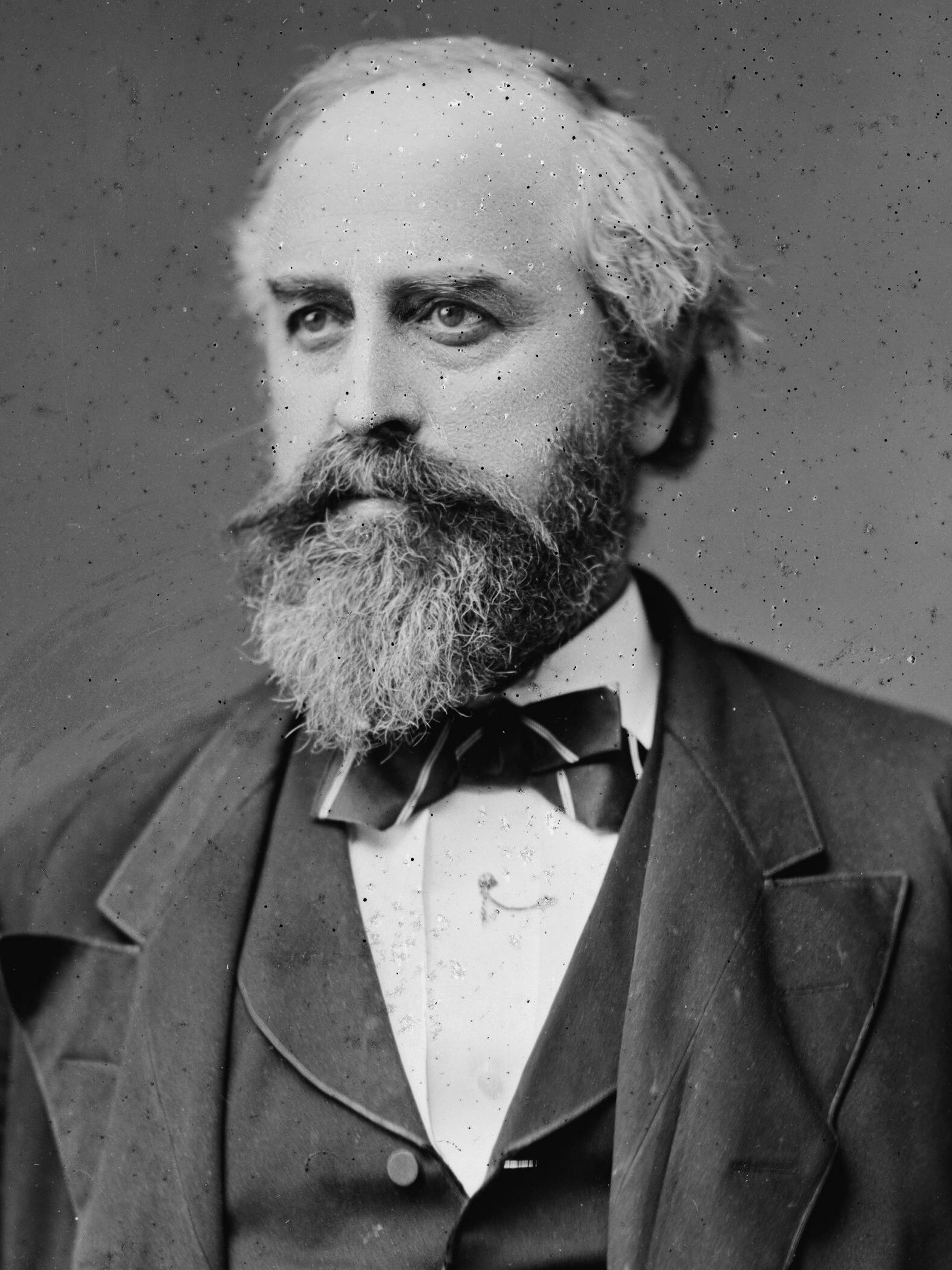

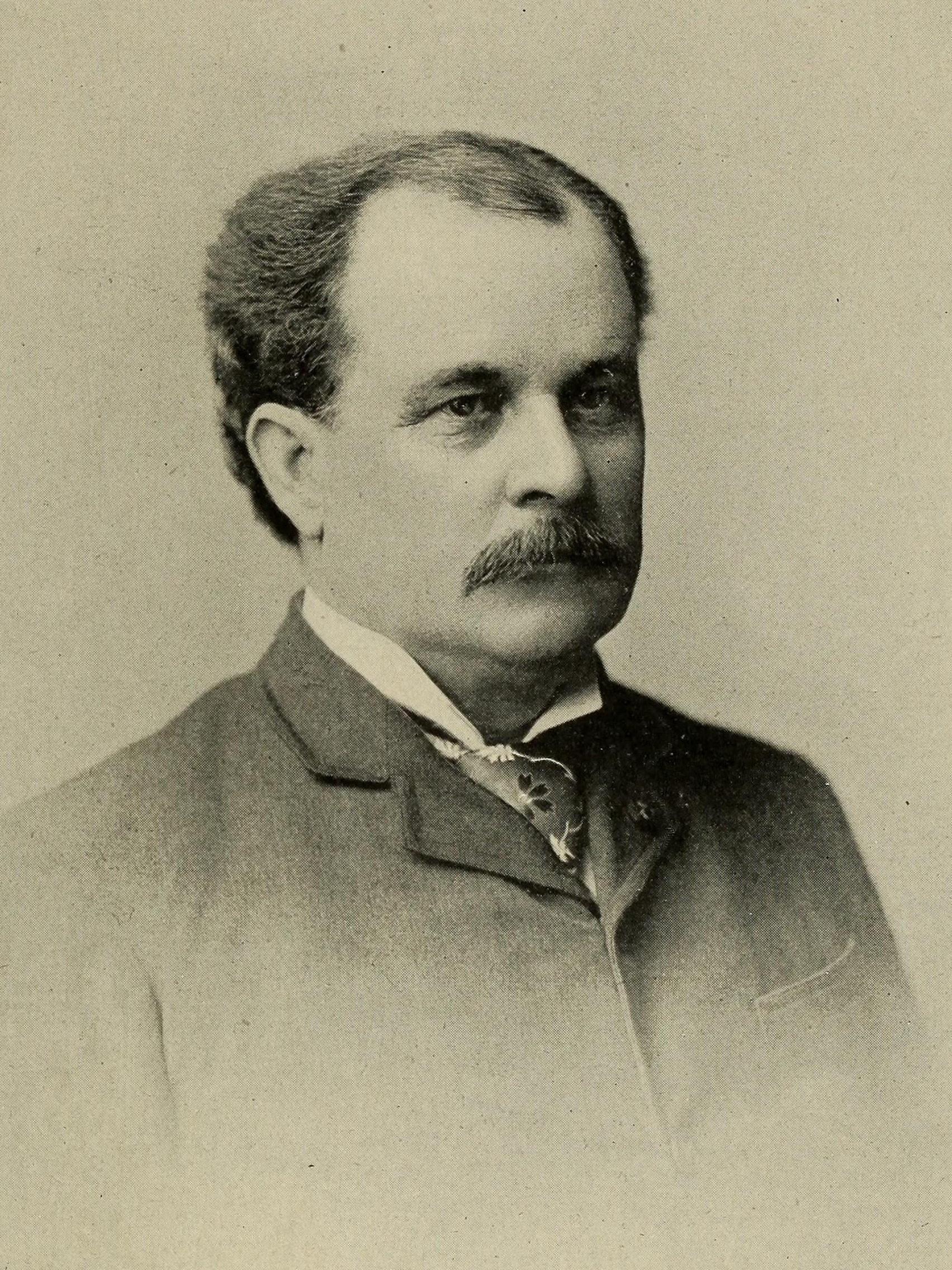
Nominee	Carter Harrison III	Eugene Cary
Party	Democratic	Republican
Popular vote	41,226	30,963
Percentage	57.11%	42.89%
Mayor before election
Carter Harrison III
Democratic
Elected mayor
Carter Harrison III
Democratic

The Chicago mayoral election of 1883 was held on Tuesday April 3, saw incumbent Carter Harrison III defeat Republican Eugene Cary by a double-digit margin.

By winning the 1883 election, Harrison became the second mayor in Chicago history to be elected to a third term (after only Francis Cornwall Sherman), and the first to be elected to a third consecutive term.

By the day of the election, Harrison was already the second-longest serving mayor in the city's history, and was only roughly a month shy of surpassing Monroe Heath as the longest serving mayor.

Harrison's 15% margin of victory was the greatest in all of his campaigns for mayor.

Harrison's opponent, Eugene Cary, was a past member of the Chicago Common Council. He had also previously been county judge and city attorney in Sheboygan, Wisconsin, and had also served as a member of the Tennessee Senate.

== Campaign ==
A key issue of the election was the "high licenses" for liquor sales in the city. Cary favored the high license.

During the campaign, many reformers, newspapers, and business interests coalesced their support behind a Citizen's Ticket that supported Republican nominee Eugene Cary for mayor.

== Results ==
1883 Chicago mayoral election
Party	Candidate	Votes	%
Democratic	Carter H. Harrison III (incumbent)	41,226	57.11
Republican	Eugene Cary	30,963	42.89
Turnout		72,189	

64% of the city's German population voted for Harrison.

Multiple publications indicate a widespread belief existed that Cary had received a majority of votes lawfully cast, but votes from a ballot box in at least one precinct favoring Cary were not included in the count certified by election officials.
