= 1885 Chicago mayoral election =

- April 7, 1885
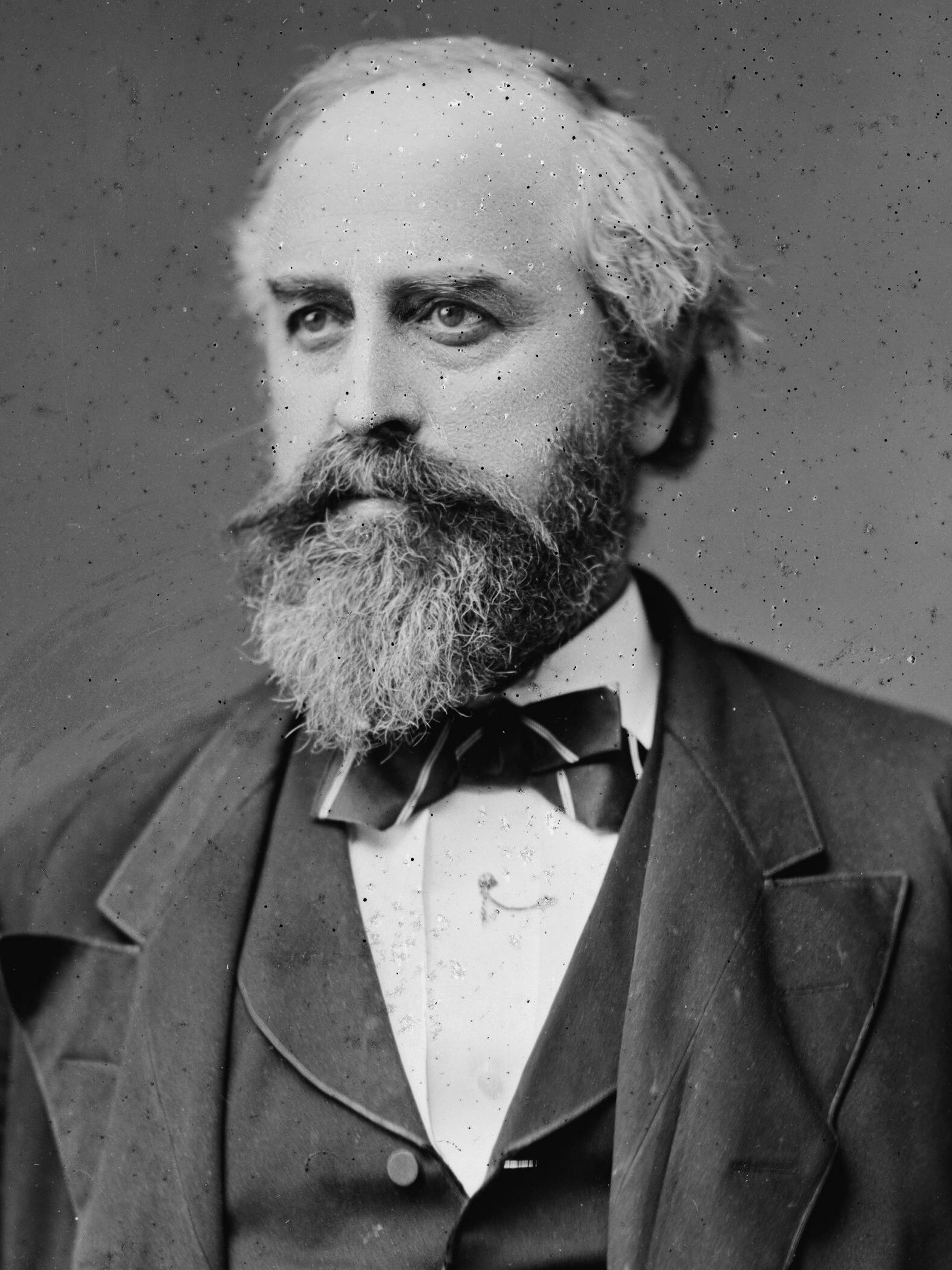

Nominee	Carter Harrison III	Sidney Smith
Party	Democratic	Republican
Popular vote	43,352	42,977
Percentage	50.09%	49.66%
Mayor before election
Carter Harrison III
Democratic
Elected mayor
Carter Harrison III
Democratic

The Chicago mayoral election of 1885 saw Democratic incumbent Carter Harrison III win an unprecedented fourth term, receiving a majority of voter and narrowly defeating Republican Sidney Smithby a less than half-percent margin of victory.

The election was held on April 7.

== Campaign ==
Democratic Mayor Harrison was challenged by Republican challenger, Sidney Smith, a judge of the Superior Court of Cook County. Before being nominated at the city's Republican convention, Smith had declared that he would not actively seek to run and would only run if nominated by the Republican Party's convention. Other speculated potential Republican nominees had been former alderman James A. Kirk and Colonel George R. Davis (former congressman) . However, in the week ahead of the Republican city nominating convention, Kirk announced that he would not run and rumors emerged that Davis would also not be interested in running. This made Smith become the likely consensus nominee.

Republicans exploited controversies which had tarnished the image of Harrison's administration. Unsubstantiated allegations of voter fraud and patronage had been key controversies throughout his mayoralty. In February 1885, a month before the election, a grand jury found Michael Cassius McDonald's right-hand man Joseph Mackin and others with connections to Harrison guilty of election fraud in the 1884 elections. Despite the fact that no personal wrongdoing on Harrison's part was involved in these charges, the charges against Mackin and others compounded with the preexisting rumors relating to Harrison to foster a public sentiment that challenged Harrison's popularity. Citizens groups led by the city's elite forged a strong campaign effort against Harrison, taking advantage of the voter fraud charges against those connected to Harrison. Harrison lost the support of many liberal German-American voters that had previously voted for him.

== Results ==
Harrison narrowly won the election.

1885 Chicago mayoral election
Party	Candidate	Votes	%
Democratic	Carter Harrison III (incumbent)	43,352	50.09
Republican	Sidney Smith	42,977	49.66
Prohibition	William Bush	221	0.26
Turnout		86,550	

Less than 50% of the city's German-American population voted for Harrison.

The Republican camp filed litigation in county court alleging that 360 illegal votes were cast for Harrison and 324 votes legally cast for Smith had not been counted, enough votes to sway the election.
