= Abner Wright =

Chicago businessman

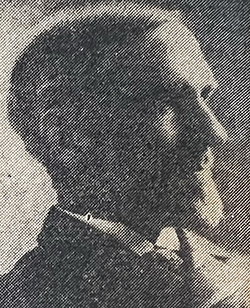
Portrait image of Wright

Abner M. Wright was an American businessman associated with the city of Chicago. Wright served as a member of the Chicago Board of Trade, and served as its president in 1886 and 1887.

Wright stood opposed to gambling interests which had partnered themselves with telegraph companies. Wright, at one point, "forcibly removed the instruments of the Postal Telegraph Company and the Baltimore and Ohio Telegraph Company from the floor of the exchange, literally throwing their equipment out of the building."

Wright was the unsuccessful Republican Party nominee in the 1879 Chicago mayoral election.

Party political offices
| Preceded by Monroe Heath | Republican nominee for Mayor of Chicago; 1879 | Succeeded by John M. Clark |
