= 1884 Wisconsin lieutenant gubernatorial election =

- November 4, 1884
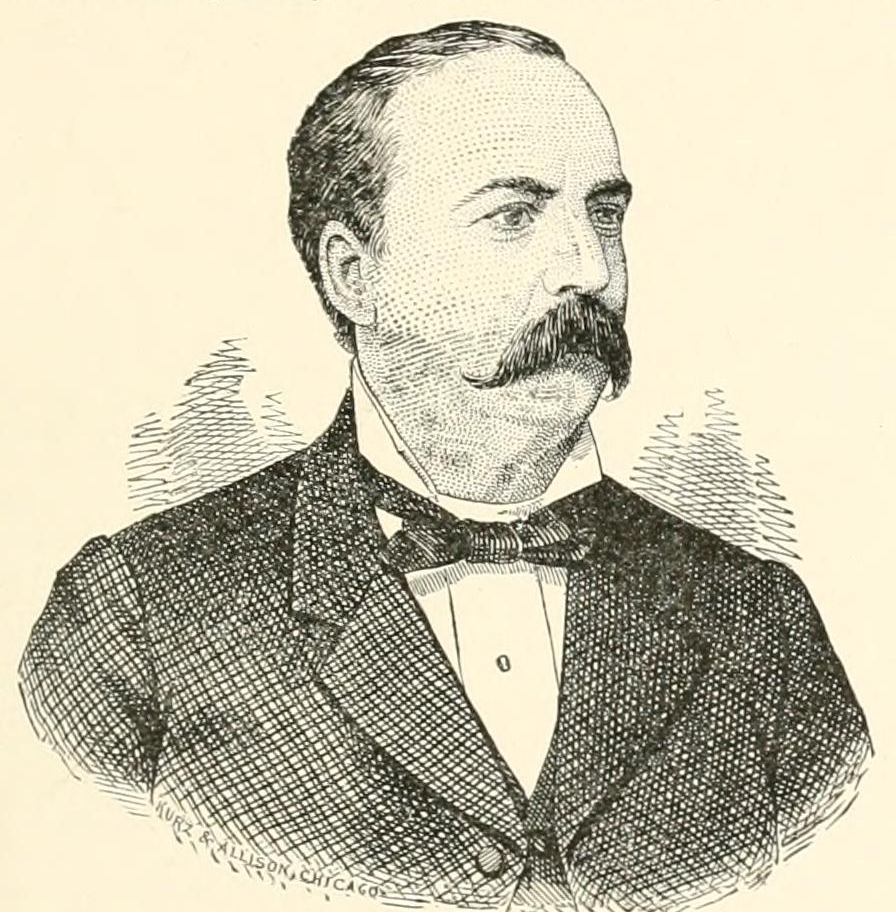

Nominee	Sam Fifield	A. C. Parkinson
Party	Republican	Democratic
Popular vote	162,037	145,155
Percentage	50.65%	45.37%
Lieutenant Governor before election
Sam Fifield
Republican
Elected Lieutenant Governor
Sam Fifield
Republican

The 1884 Wisconsin lieutenant gubernatorial election was held on November 4, 1884, in order to elect the lieutenant governor of Wisconsin. Incumbent Republican lieutenant governor Sam Fifield defeated Democratic nominee A. C. Parkinson, Prohibition nominee A. A. Kelly and Greenback nominee and former member of the Wisconsin State Assembly Milan Ford. This was the first Wisconsin lieutenant gubernatorial election held following a constitutional amendment in 1882, which moved the state's elections from odd to even-numbered years.

== General election ==
On election day, November 4, 1884, incumbent Republican lieutenant governor Sam Fifield won re-election by a margin of 16,882 votes against his foremost opponent Democratic nominee A. C. Parkinson, thereby retaining Republican control over the office of lieutenant governor. Fifield was sworn in for his second term on January 5, 1885.

=== Results ===
Wisconsin lieutenant gubernatorial election, 1884
Party	Candidate	Votes	%
Republican	Sam Fifield (incumbent)	162,037	50.65
Democratic	A. C. Parkinson	145,155	45.37
Prohibition	A. A. Kelly	8,406	2.63
Greenback	Milan Ford	4,308	1.35
	Scattering	12	0.00
Total votes		319,918	100.00
Republican hold			
