= George L. Dunlap =

American political figure

City Marshall of Chicago
- In office July 30, 1875 – November 22, 1875
- Mayor: Harvey D. Colvin
- Preceded by: Position established
- Succeeded by: Roswell Eaton Goodell

Personal details
- Born: 1830 Maine, United States
- Died: May 12, 1904 (aged 73–74) Paris, France
- Party: Democratic

George L. Dunlap (1830-1904) served as president of the Chicago & North Western Railway and as City Marshall of Chicago.

== Biography ==
Dunlap was born in 1830 in Maine.

In his career, Dunlap served in various corporate leadership roles at the Chicago & North Western Railway, including general superintendent and president.

As the Galena and Chicago Union Railroad continued to build roads west through Iowa in the early 1860s, progress was hampered by the war. It wasn't until 1864 that a newly reorganized Chicago & Northwestern railroad was able to put together The Great Consolidation, making it one organization with multiple divisions.

George L Dunlap was formerly Asst. Supt. of the Chicago, St Anthony [St. Paul] & Fon du Lac RR which failed during the financial panic of 1857. William B Ogden was able to regenerate it as the Chicago & North Western Railway in 1859 and brought Dunlap along as Supt. After the Great Consolidation Dunlap became the first General Supt. for the entire consolidated railroad. IB Howe's Iowa Division included everything from Clinton to the town of Nevada at that time. The Galena Road on the Chicago side of the river became the Galena Division with Dr. EH Williams as Supt. and JC Gault as his assistant. The Nevada railhead was already west of Marshalltown, but by the end of the year they would have pushed the Road past Ames to Boone. The race to Council Bluffs and the transcontinental railroad in Omaha on the Missouri River was on.

Just prior to establishing connection with Council Bluffs Iowa and the Union Pacific transcontinental railroad, the town of Dunlap Iowa was created as a C&NW 'company town' being the "proper point for terminus of the Division, ..... locating a town there and establishing comfortable homes for our men, thereby attaching them to the Co.'s interest and increasing their efficiency." .... "engine house at Dunlap.... secure the spring at "Dunlap".

In late 1869, as president, Dunlap took strong interest in George Westinghouse's railway air brake, inviting him to Chicago to demonstrate the brake to other railroad officials and members of the press. Westinghouse thereafter ran a demonstration trip to Chicago, which helped to advance the adoption of the new technology.

Dunlap was a sailing enthusiast.

From July 30 until November 22, 1875, Dunlap served as City Marshall of Chicago, a newly reconstituted position which served as co-head of the Chicago Police Department alongside the General Superintendent (which was held, coinciding with Dunlap's tenure as Marshall, first by Jacob Rehm until October 4 and thereafter by Michael C. Hickey beginning on October 7). Dunlap had been appointed by mayor Harvey D. Colvin.

Dunlap was an unsuccessful contender for the Democratic mayoral nomination in 1879.

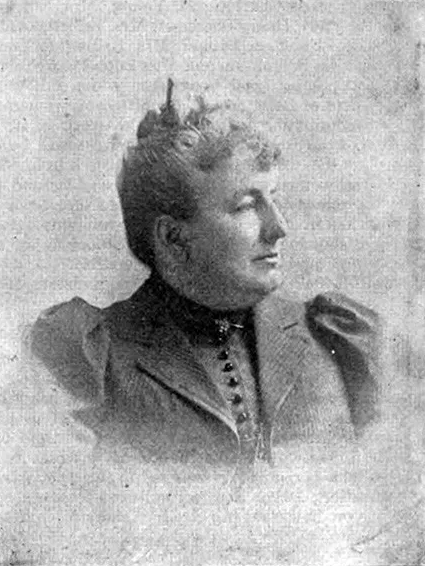
Dunlap's wife circa 1893

Dunlap married a daughter of John Blake Rice. Dunlap's wife was principally involved in creating the Children's Building annex of The Woman's Building at the 1893 World's Columbian Exposition in Chicago.

Dunlap served as president of the Chicago Belt Company, which in the 1890s had unsuccessfully planned to build a belt rail line around Chicago.

== Legacy ==
Dunlap is the namesake of Dunlap, Iowa.
