= 1884 Connecticut lieutenant gubernatorial election =

- November 4, 1884

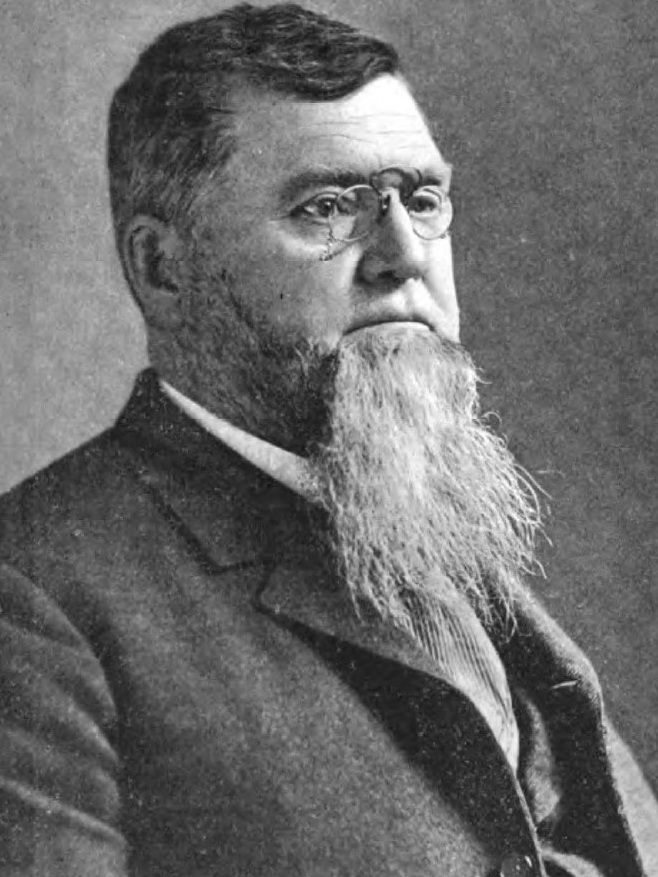
Nominee	George G. Sumner	Lorrin A. Cooke
Party	Democratic	Republican
Popular vote	67,140	66,885
Percentage	48.74%	48.56%
Lieutenant Governor before election
George G. Sumner
Democratic
Elected Lieutenant Governor
Lorrin A. Cooke
Republican

The 1884 Connecticut lieutenant gubernatorial election was held on November 4, 1884, to elect the lieutenant governor of Connecticut. Incumbent Democratic lieutenant governor George G. Sumner received a plurality of the votes against Republican nominee and incumbent Presidents pro tempore of the Connecticut Senate Lorrin A. Cooke, Prohibition nominee Andrew J. Culver and Greenback nominee Henry L. Soper. However, since no candidate received a majority in the popular vote, Lorrin A. Cooke was elected by the Connecticut General Assembly per the Connecticut Charter of 1662.

== General election ==
On election day, November 4, 1884, incumbent Democratic lieutenant governor George G. Sumner won a plurality of the vote by a margin of 255 votes against his foremost opponent Republican nominee Lorrin A. Cooke. However, as no candidate received a majority of the vote, the election was forwarded to the Connecticut General Assembly, who elected Lorrin A. Cooke, thereby gaining Republican control over the office of lieutenant governor. Cooke was sworn in as the 62nd lieutenant governor of Connecticut on January 8, 1885.

=== Results ===
Connecticut lieutenant gubernatorial election, 1884
Party	Candidate	Votes	%
Republican	Lorrin A. Cooke	66,885	48.56
Democratic	George G. Sumner (incumbent)	67,140	48.74
Prohibition	Andrew J. Culver	2,101	1.53
Greenback	Henry L. Soper	1,584	1.15
	Scattering	29	0.02
Total votes		137,744	100.00
Republican gain from Democratic			
