= 1884 Texas lieutenant gubernatorial election =

- November 4, 1884
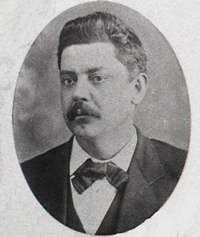

Nominee	Barnett Gibbs	John Leal Haynes
Party	Democratic	Republican
Popular vote	236,685	51,387
Percentage	82.16%	17.84%
Lieutenant Governor before election
Francis Marion Martin
Democratic
Elected Lieutenant Governor
Barnett Gibbs
Democratic

The 1884 Texas lieutenant gubernatorial election was held on November 4, 1884, in order to elect the lieutenant governor of Texas. Democratic nominee and state senator Barnett Gibbs defeated Republican nominee John Leal Haynes.

== General election ==
During this period, Texas was a part of the "Solid South" and the Democratic party was heavily favored in state elections.

In the previous election, a strategy of electoral fusionism was attempted between opposition Republican and Greenback parties in order to consolidate their resources to better oppose the Democratic ticket. Both parties endorsed the independent campaign of congressman and former lieutenant governor George Washington Jones for governor. The combined ticket only claimed 40% of the popular vote. In the 1884 cycle, Jones announced his candidacy a second time and the diminishing Greenback party continued to support him. He did not pick a lieutenant governor candidate to run on the independent ticket with him. The Republican party was split on the issue and while most supported the combined ticket, a faction proceeded with the creation of its own slate of candidates.

The incumbent lieutenant governor, Francis Marion Martin, after having disagreed with policies of the incumbent governor, John Ireland, contemplated challenging Ireland for the gubernatorial nomination instead of running for reelection, but instead declined to run for any office.

On election day, November 4, 1884, Democratic nominee Barnett Gibbs won the election by a margin of 185,298 votes against his opponent Republican nominee John Leal Haynes, thereby retaining Democratic control over the office of lieutenant governor. Gibbs was sworn in as the 15th lieutenant governor of Texas on January 20, 1885.

=== Candidates ===
- Barnett Gibbs, state senator, former city attorney of Dallas (Democrat)
- John Leal Haynes, customs agent from Brownsville, former state representative (Republican)

=== Results ===
Texas lieutenant gubernatorial election, 1884
Party	Candidate	Votes	%	±%
Democratic	Barnett Gibbs	236,685	82.16	▲13.37
Republican	John Leal Haynes	51,387	17.84	N/A
Total votes		288,072	100.00	
Democratic hold				
