= 1884 Illinois lieutenant gubernatorial election =

Illinois lieutenant gubernatorial election

- November 4, 1884
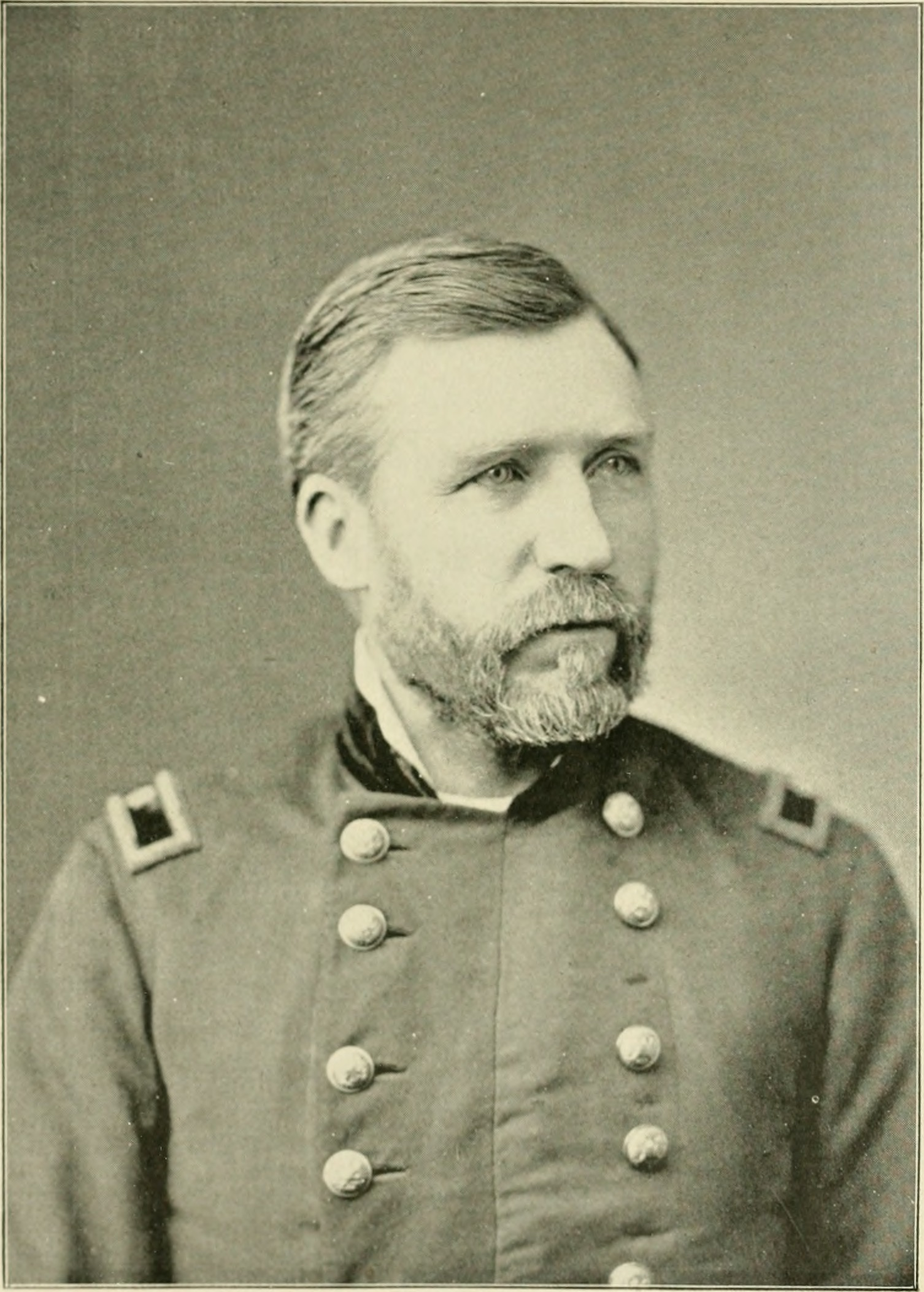

Nominee	John Corson Smith	Henry Seiter
Party	Republican	Democratic
Popular vote	337,762	314,493
Percentage	50.16%	46.71%
Lieutenant Governor before election
John Marshall Hamilton
Republican
Elected Lieutenant Governor
John Corson Smith
Republican

The 1884 Illinois lieutenant gubernatorial election was held on November 4, 1884, in order to elect the Lieutenant Governor of Illinois. Republican nominee John Corson Smith defeated Democratic nominee Henry Seiter as well as two other third-party candidates.

== Results ==
Illinois lieutenant gubernatorial election, 1884
Party	Candidate	Votes	Percent
Republican	John Corson Smith	337,762	50.16
Democratic	Henry Seiter	314,493	46.71
Prohibition	John LaFayette Perryman	11,360	1.69
Greenback	A. C. Vanderwater	9,723	1.44
