= Joseph Brucker =

American journalist

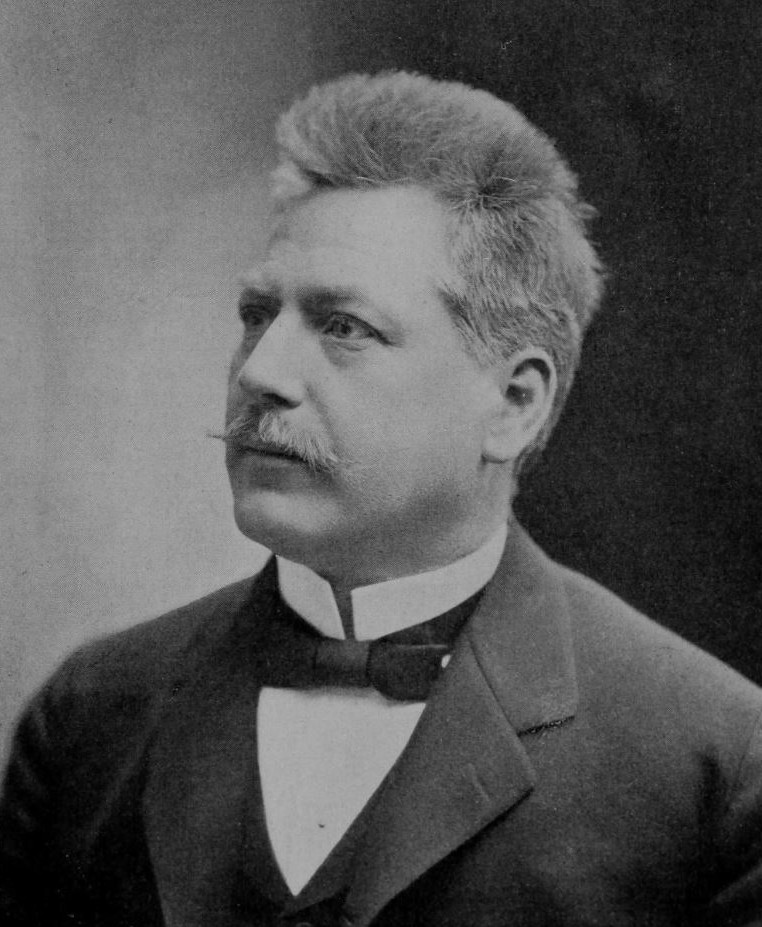
- Born: October 30, 1849; Bad Ischl, Austrian Empire
- Died: October 5, 1921 (aged 71); San Francisco, California, U.S.
- Education: University of Vienna
- Occupation: Newspaper editor
- Political party: Republican
- Spouse: Rosa Morawetz

Signature
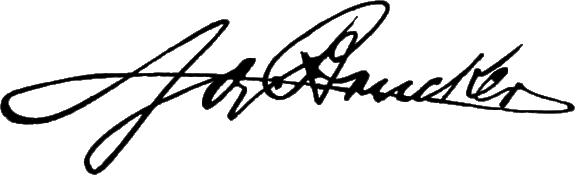

Joseph Brucker (October 30, 1849 – October 5, 1921) was an Austrian American newspaper editor who was active in the Republican Party, serving as Secretary of the Wisconsin Republican State Convention and as a member of the Illinois Republican State Central committee.

== Early years ==
Born in 1849 in Bad Ischl (located in modern-day Austria), Brucker was the son of Joseph Brucker and Antonia Ozlberger Brucker. He was educated at the University of Vienna. Finding his politics too radical for Europe, he immigrated to the United States in 1871, first finding employment with a railroad survey company in Wisconsin, then as a teacher.

== Career ==
After several failed ventures, he was hired in 1894 as managing editor of the renowned Illinois Staats-Zeitung by its owner, A.C. Hesing to replace his son Washington, who left the paper because he was appointed postmaster of Chicago by President Cleveland. Brucker stayed with the paper until 1901, when he went to Germany to become the editor of the Columbia Berlin. His later life is almost totally unknown, and he appears to have fallen from the public eye following the divorce from his wife. Brucker participated in the 1920 United States census and was living as a boarder in San Francisco at the time.

== Personal life and death ==
In 1873, Brucker married Rose Morawetz. His daughter Antoinette married Edwin O. Raster, son of the editor and politician Hermann Raster. He died in San Francisco on October 5, 1921.

== See also ==
- Illinois Staats-Zeitung
- Germans in Chicago
