= People's Party (Illinois) =

Anti-temperance political party in Illinois, US (1873-1875)

- Leader: A.C. Hesing
- Founded: 1873
- Dissolved: 1875
- Merged into: Republican Party
- Ideology: Anti-Temperance
- Political position: Center
- Colors: Red

The People's Party was a short-lived political party in the state of Illinois, founded in 1873 in the interest of combating the temperance movement and alcohol prohibition in Chicago.

The party was founded by German Americans Boss Hesing and Hermann Raster of the Illinois Staats-Zeitung, who temporarily split with the Republican Party due to its inaction with fighting anti-liquor laws. While the People's Party lasted only two years, it succeeded in electing Harvey Doolittle Colvin as Mayor of Chicago in 1873. The voting base of the People's Party primarily consisted of the German, Irish, Scandinavian, and Bohemian communities of Chicago.

== See also ==
- Illinois Staats-Zeitung
- Temperance movement
