= Theodore Brentano =

American judge

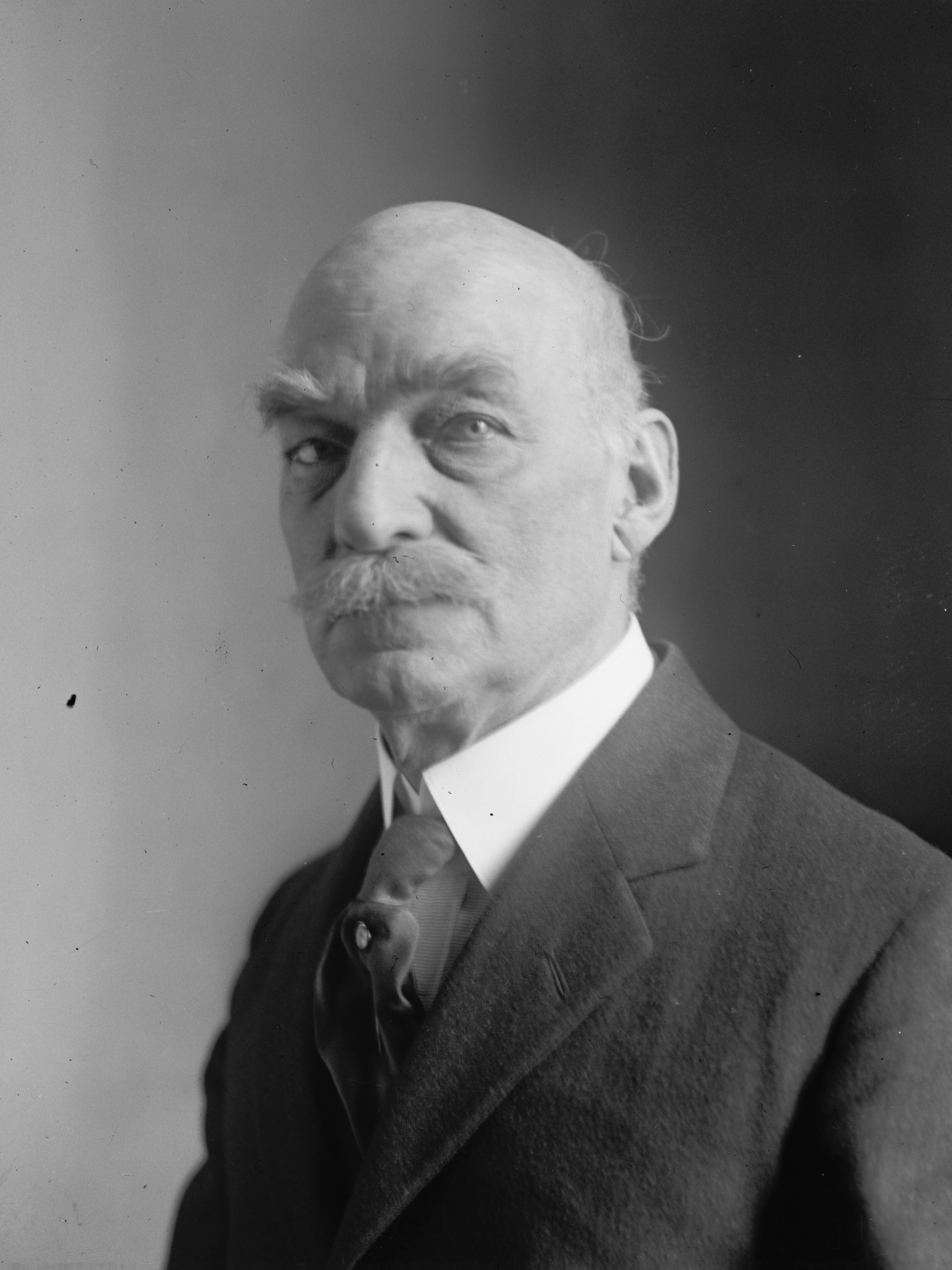
- Brentano in 1922

United States Ambassador to Hungary
- In office February 10, 1922 – May 6, 1927
- President: Warren G. Harding; Calvin Coolidge
- Preceded by: position established
- Succeeded by: J. Butler Wright

Judge of the Superior Court of Cook County
- In office November 26, 1890 – 1921
- Preceded by: Gwynne Garnett

Personal details
- Born: March 29, 1854 Kalamazoo, Michigan, U.S.
- Died: July 2, 1940 (aged 86) Larchmont, New York, U.S.
- Resting place: Graceland Cemetery
- Party: Republican
- Spouse: Minnie Claussenius
- Parent: Lorenz Brentano
- Occupation: Attorney, judge, civil servant

Theodore Brentano (March 29, 1854 – July 2, 1940) was an American attorney and judge and the first U.S. ambassador to Hungary (his full title was "Envoy Extraordinary and Minister Plenipotentiary"). He was appointed to the position by Warren G. Harding.

== Early life and career ==
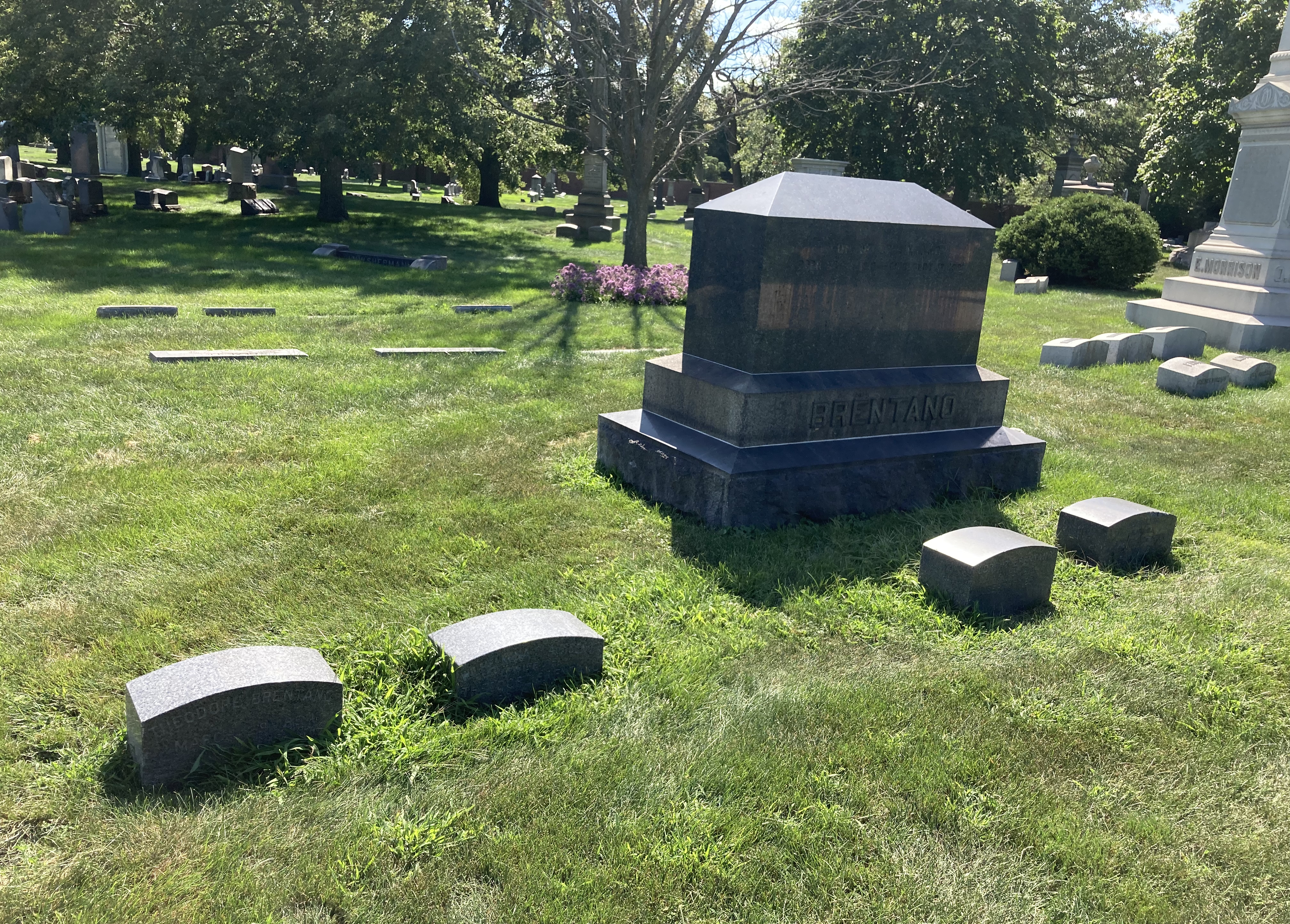
Brentano's grave (leftmost) at Graceland Cemetery

Born on March 29, 1854 in Kalamazoo, Michigan to Lorenzo Brentano and his wife Caroline, Theodore Brentano was educated in Chicago, Dresden and Zurich. He studied law at National University Law School (which later was absorbed into the George Washington University Law School). Brentano married Minnie Claussenius on May 17, 1887. While Brentano was at law school in Washington, D.C. area, his father was serving a term as a U.S. congressman representing a Chicago, Illinois-based district.

Brentano was admitted to the bar of the Supreme Court of the District of Columbia, and was later admitted to the Illinois Bar. On November 13, 1882, he opened a law office in Chicago.

In 1887, Chicago Mayor John A. Roche appointed him an assistant city attorney.

In 1888, Brentano was nominated by the Republican Party in the election for Chicago city attorney. While Brentano received 10,000 more votes than any other Republican nominee for city office that year, he lost the election by a small margin-of-plurality. After his defeat, he formed a law partnership with Hempstead Washburne and continued to practice as a lawyer until becoming a judge.

== Superior Court of Cook County (1890–1921) ==
In November 1890, Brentano was elected to the Superior Court of Cook County (in Cook County, Illinois) to fill a vacancy left by the resignation of Gwynne Garnett. Brentano was re-elected to a full six-year term in November 1891, and won further re-election in 1897, 1903 1910, and 1917. His election in 1890 had come due to wide support from both Democrats and Republicans.

While on the court, Brentano served for a time as its chief justice. Brentano remained on the bench for thirty-one years. As a judge, Brentano presided over the high-profile trial of Patrick Eugene Prendergast for the assassination of Carter Harrison III (the mayor of Chicago).

== Editor of the Illinois Staats-Zeitung ==
In 1899 Brentano became the new treasurer and president of the Illinois Staats-Zeitung, the newspaper of which his father was editor during the Civil War, when the majority stockholders appointed a new board of directors and ousted former treasurer Charles Francis Pietsch.

== Minister to Hungary (1922–1927) ==
Brentano was appointed as minister to Hungary on February 10, 1922, arrived in Budapest on May 10, presented his credentials on May 16, and served until May 6, 1927.

== Death ==
He died at his daughter's home in Larchmont, New York on July 2, 1940, and was buried at Graceland Cemetery in Chicago.

== See also ==
- Hungary – United States relations
- United States Ambassador to Hungary
- Illinois Staats-Zeitung
