= Hermann Kriege =

German-American journalist and revolutionary (1820–1850)

Hermann Rudolph Kriege
- Born: July 25, 1820; Lienen, Province of Westphalia, Kingdom of Prussia
- Died: December 31, 1850 (age 30); New York City, New York, US
- Education: Leipzig University; Ludwig-Maximilians-Universität München
- Occupation: Journalist

Hermann Kriege (1820–1850) was a German American revolutionary and journalist of the first half of the 19th century.

Kriege's journalistic activities supporting socialist ideas caused him to be arrested and jailed in 1844. After serving his sentence, he traveled to Bremen, then London, and finally to New York.

In New York he wrote for the Volks-Tribun, a German language newspaper active in the 1840s. Following the Revolutions of 1848, he briefly returned to Germany but left soon after for the United States again. This time he settled in Chicago, where he became editor of the newly-formed Illinois Staats-Zeitung, a position he held until 1849, when he again returned to New York.

Kriege suffered from mental illness and died in the Bloomingdale Insane Asylum in 1850, at age 30.

Preceded by none	Editor in Chief of the Illinois Staats-Zeitung; 1848-1849	Succeeded by George Schneider
