= Anton C. Hesing =

American journalist

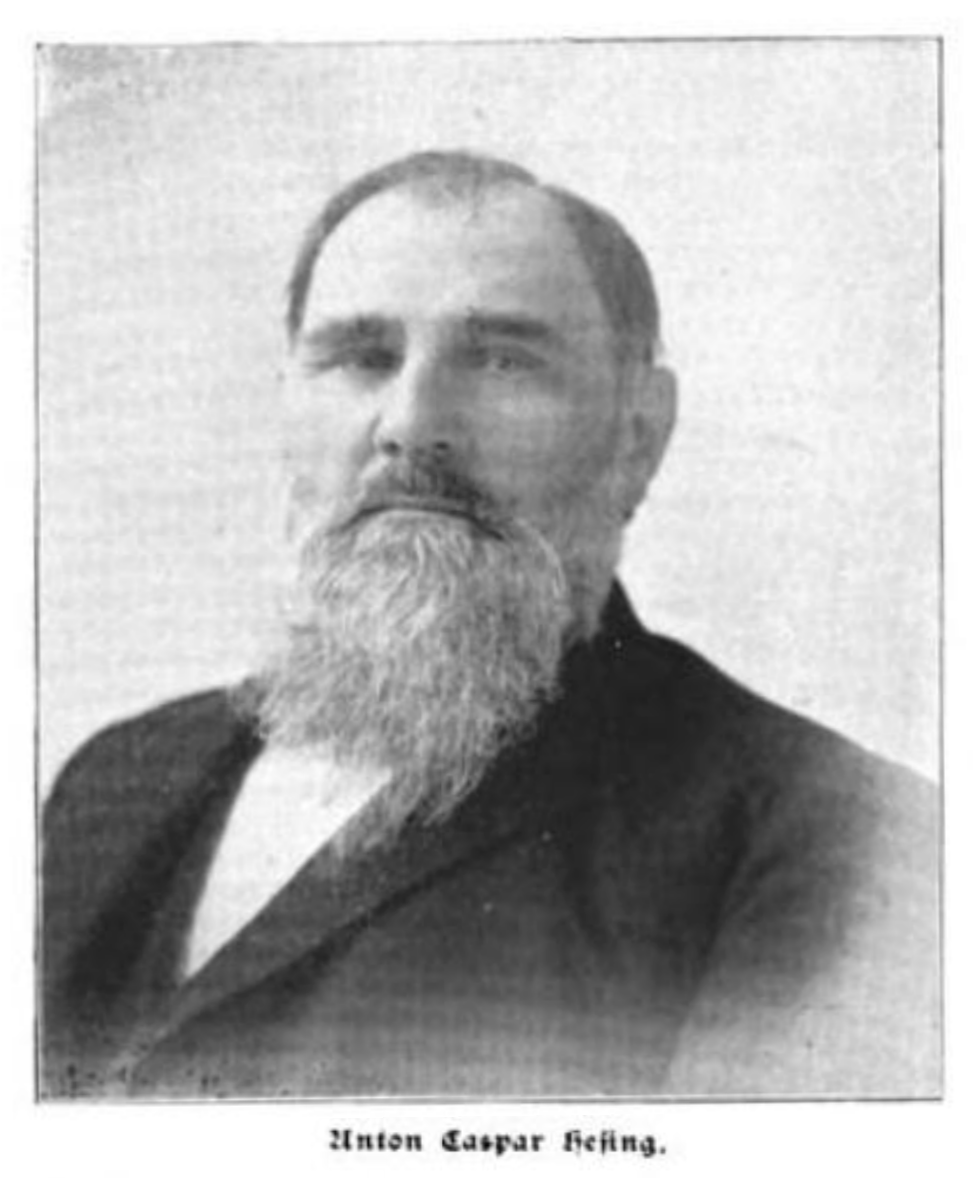

Cook County Sheriff
- In office November 1860 – November 1862
- Preceded by: John Gray
- Succeeded by: David L. Hammond

Personal details
- Born: Anton Caspar Hesing; January 6, 1823 Vechta, Grand Duchy of Oldenburg
- Died: March 31, 1895 (aged 72) Chicago, Illinois, US
- Resting place: Saint Boniface Cemetery, Chicago
- Party: Whig; Republican; People's Party
- Spouse: Louisa Lamping Hesing
- Children: Washington Hesing
- Known for: Newspaper publisher and political boss

Anton Caspar Hesing (1823–1895), known as "Boss Hesing", was a German-American newspaper publisher and political boss who became a prominent figure in Chicago during the second half of the 19th Century. The long-time publisher of the Illinois Staats-Zeitung and political boss of the pro-liquor wing of the Republican Party, Hesing is remembered as one of the most influential figures of the 1870s in the emerging metropolis of Chicago, responsible, alongside his compatriot Hermann Raster, for the adoption of a national anti-temperance platform for the Republican Party in 1872, the creation of the People's Party in 1873, and the subsequent election of Harvey Doolittle Colvin as Mayor of Chicago. During his final years, the wealthy Hesing engaged in a number of philanthropic ventures, including a large role in financing of Chicago's Schiller Theater.

== Biography ==
=== Early years ===
Anton Caspar Hesing was born January 6, 1823, in Vechta in the German Grand Duchy of Oldenburg, today part of Lower Saxony in Germany. His father was a brewer and distiller. His mother died when Anton was 6 and his father made him an orphan at age 15. Although he initially apprenticed as a baker and brewer, he came to feel the relationship oppressive and his master unjust and resolved to make a new life for himself across the sea in America.

Upon arrival in the United States in 1839, Hesing settled in the German enclave that was Cincinnati, Ohio, where he first worked as a grocery clerk. Hesing saved his money frugally and within two years had accumulated enough money to launch a grocery store of his own — a business which he maintained until 1848.

A visit to Germany in 1847 ended with marriage to Louisa Lamping, with the couple returning together to make a home in the USA. Together they had a son, Washington Hesing, born in 1849.

The year following his return, Hesing sold his grocery business and invested the proceeds in a hotel located on Race and Court Streets in Cincinnati. This enterprise came to an end with the death of his business partner by suicide in 1854, however, causing Hesing to sell his interest in the hotel and to move with his family to Chicago.

In Chicago Hesing purchased brick manufacturing equipment and opened a brickyard a few miles away from the center of the city. The patented equipment he purchased proved to be inferior, however, and the venture proved to be a financial failure. Undeterred by his initial lack of success, Hesing made another entry into the brick manufacturing business in partnership with a man named Charles S. Dole, opening a more conventional brickyard at Highland Park, located just north of Chicago. This venture proved to be profitable although it ultimately fell victim to the economic collapse associated with the Panic of 1857.

After a brief and unsuccessful venture as proprietor of a resale shop, Hesing took a position as a clerk in the Chicago Board of Public Works. He was later appointed a deputy sheriff in 1858 and two years ran for public office for the first time, winning election as sheriff of Cook County as a Republican, running on the same ticket as Abraham Lincoln. Hesing thereby became the first German immigrant to hold elective office in the state of Illinois. Hesing would remain as sheriff for a single two-year term of office.

A staunch supporter of the Federal government in the American Civil War, Hesing helped to recruit soldiers during the conflict, playing a part in the organization of the immigrant-dominated 24th and 82nd Illinois Volunteer Infantry Regiments as well as Shambeck's Dragoons.

=== Publishing career ===
The Illinois Staats-Zeitung building constructed after the Great Chicago Fire of 1871.

In 1862, as his term of office as Cook County sheriff was nearing an end, Hesing purchased an ownership stake in the leading German-language newspaper of the region, the Illinois Staats-Zeitung (Illinois State News), a paper which dated to 1848 and which had been in daily operation since 1851. His new ownership stake did not initially mean a quick path to fame and fortune, however, as during the wartime years of 1863 and 1864 Hesing earned an income of just over $4,900 and slightly less than $2,800, respectively.

Despite his modest income from the paper, by 1867 Hesing was able to muster $80,000 to buy out his remaining partner, Lorenz Brentano, and to thereby attain complete control of the Staats-Zeitung. He would subsequently hire New York resident and Forty-Eighter Hermann Raster as editor-in-chief and build it one of the most successful German newspapers in North America, alongside other papers from St. Louis, Milwaukee, and New York City.

The Staats-Zeitung was particularly hard hit during the October 1871 Great Chicago Fire. Not only was the building housing the publication, including its machinery and type, lost to the flames, but so too were back files of the paper and the publication's records of accounts. Moreover, virtually the entire staff of the paper from editors to press operators found themselves burned out of their homes.

Necessary lead type for producing a German-language paper proved impossible to obtain on short notice and as a temporary measure production was moved briefly to the German enclave of Milwaukee, Wisconsin. After a mere 20 days production returned to a new press in a new facility in Chicago.

A new permanent home for the paper was finally located about one mile away from the Chicago city center, in a new multi-story structure built at the corner of Washington Street and Fifth Avenue. The building measured 100 feet from the basement floor to the peak of the roof, making it one of the largest buildings in its area of town, and was designed with the monumental sensibilities of old Europe.

=== Political career ===
Anton Hesing as he appeared in the prime of life, approximately 1870.

Even during his Ohio years, Anton Hesing was politically active, participating as a member of the Hamilton County Committee of the Whig Party even before he was old enough to vote. In 1852 he was made a member of the Ohio State Executive Committee of the Whig Party.

Hesing's role in the emerging Republican Party of Illinois was mostly editorial, advancing the party's ideas and agenda in the pages of the Staats-Zeitung. He lent support to the Lincoln Administration during the war and advocated in favor of Radical Reconstruction in the years immediately following surrender of the Southern rebellion.

In the aftermath of the Great Chicago Fire of 1871, a new city administration came to the fore under the banner of the temporary "Fireproof Party," headed by Mayor Joseph Medill, former managing editor of the Chicago Tribune. Medill, a Canadian-born Republican, was induced to begin enforcement of previously ignored anti-liquor Blue laws — measures deeply offensive to the cultural traditions of the German immigrant population. Anton Hesing would be moved to political action by this cultural battle within ostensibly Republican ranks, speaking to an organizational convention on May 14, 1873, which would result in establishment of a new political organization called the People's Party.

This de facto Republican splinter organization ran its slate of anti-Blue law candidates in opposition to the prohibitionist candidates of the Republican Party as well as those of the hated Democrats. Although not himself a candidate for office of the party, Hesing played a leading role in the insurgent organization, writing its platform and assisting in the organization and promotion of meetings running up to election day in November 1873. The movement ultimately proved triumphant polls, electing H.D. Colvin as the 27th Mayor of Chicago by a plurality of about 10,000 votes.

Despite his immense backstage political influence, particularly during the decade of the 1870s, Hesing was reticent to enter the field as a candidate himself, firmly declining suggestions that he led the People's Party ticket as a candidate for U.S. Congress in the election of 1874. Hesing's own personal political service was instead limited to a stint as a member of the Lincoln Park Board of Commissioners from 1874 to 1876.

Hesing served three months of prison time for his role in the Whiskey Ring.

=== Later years ===
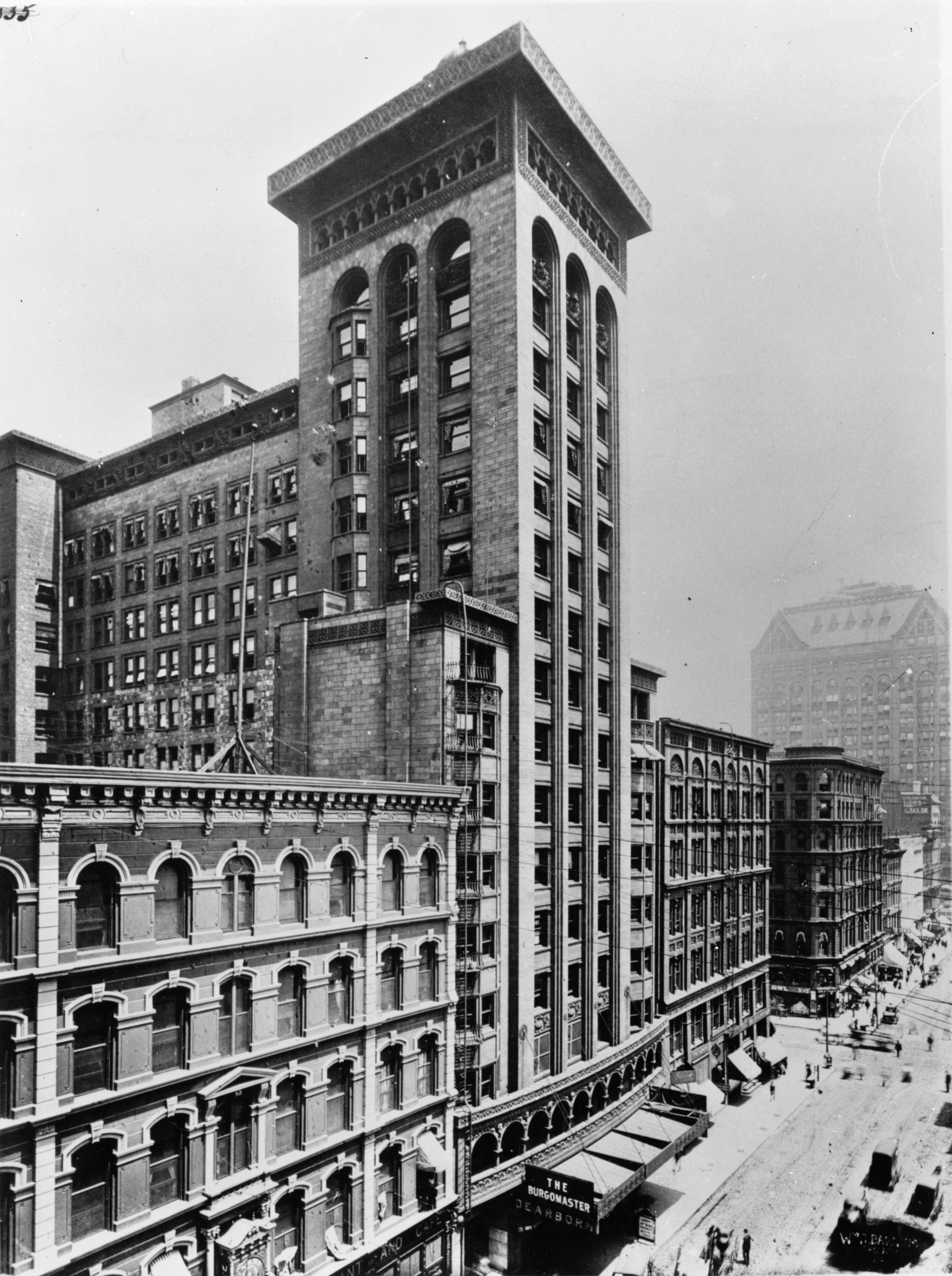
A philanthropist during his twilight years, Anton Hesing was one of the primary donors for the construction of the Schiller Theater.

Hesing's wife died in 1886, coinciding with an end to direct participation in public affairs for him.

The wealthy Hesing was involved in a number of philanthropic ventures, playing a key role in the establishment of St. Elizabeth Hospital in Chicago and the Altenheim German Old People's Home in Forest Park. He was also one of the primary contributors to the construction fund for the Schiller Theater on Randolph Street, a 1300-seat venue opened in 1891 for the hosting of the performances of Chicago's German Opera Company.

On August 22, 1894, while visiting the neighboring state of Wisconsin, Anton Hesing was stricken by a stroke — a first bout with the condition that would ultimately kill him less than one year later. He returned to Chicago and managed to recover almost completely from this first attack, but further withdrew from external activity.

=== Death and legacy ===
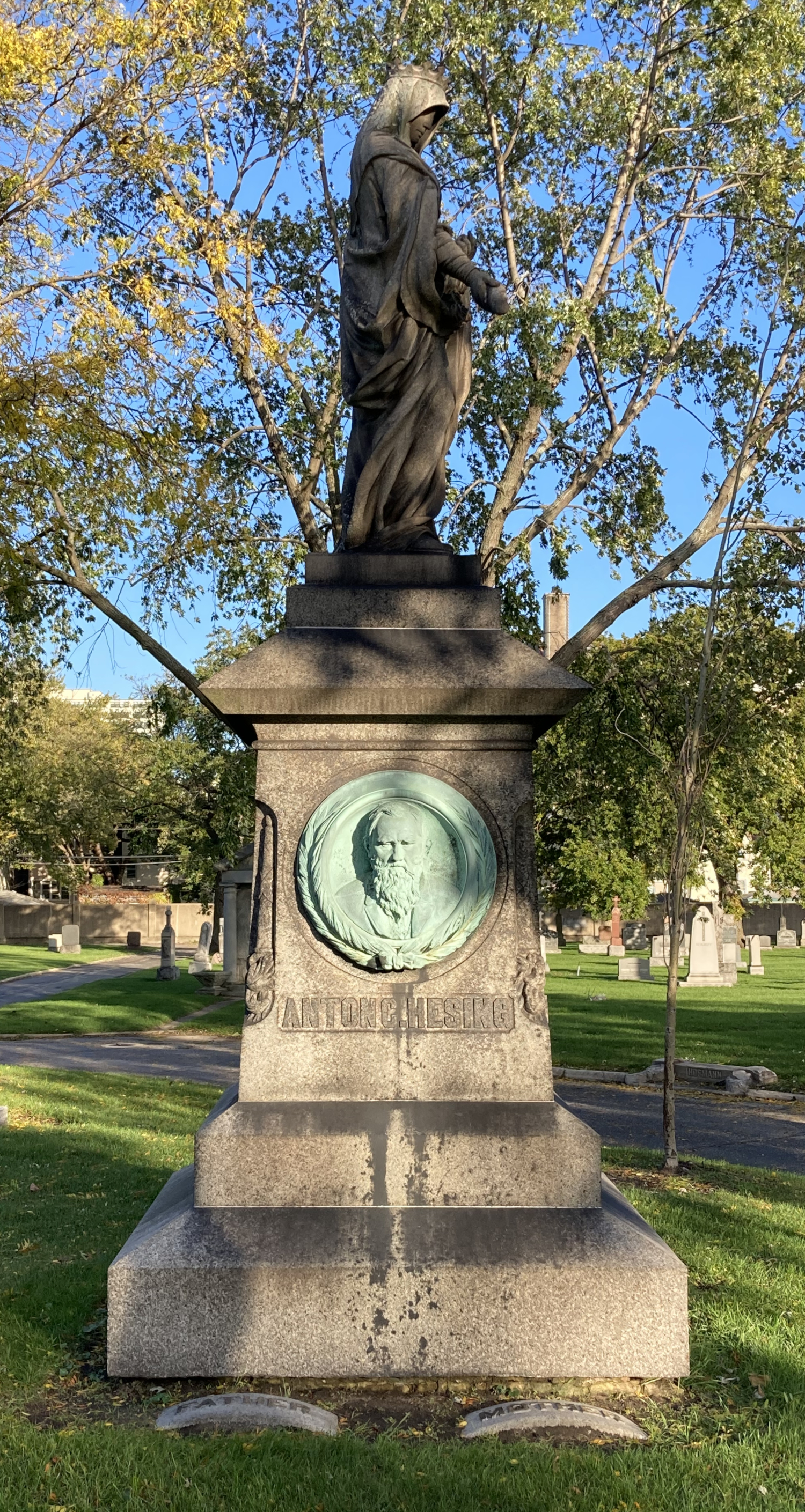
Hesing's grave at Saint Boniface Cemetery

On the evening of March 30, 1895, agitated by a recent action of the Chicago City Council, Hesing set to work writing an editorial that was to be published in the Staats-Zeitung above his own signature. He retired late and woke up again at 1 am, feeling unwell. A doctor was called, who tentatively diagnosed a bout of indigestion, and Hesing returned to bed, sleeping until 7:00 am.

Shortly after waking, a massive stroke hit Hesing, who died approximately one hour later in the morning of March 31, 1895, at his home in Chicago. He was 72 years old at the time of his death. His body was buried at Saint Boniface Cemetery in Chicago beneath an obelisk bearing a copper plaque.

In his 1976 monograph, The Germans of Chicago, historian Rudolf Hofmeister asserts that "Anton Hesing probably had more impact on the German element and its standing within the community than any other German in Chicago's history."
