= Wilhelm Rapp =

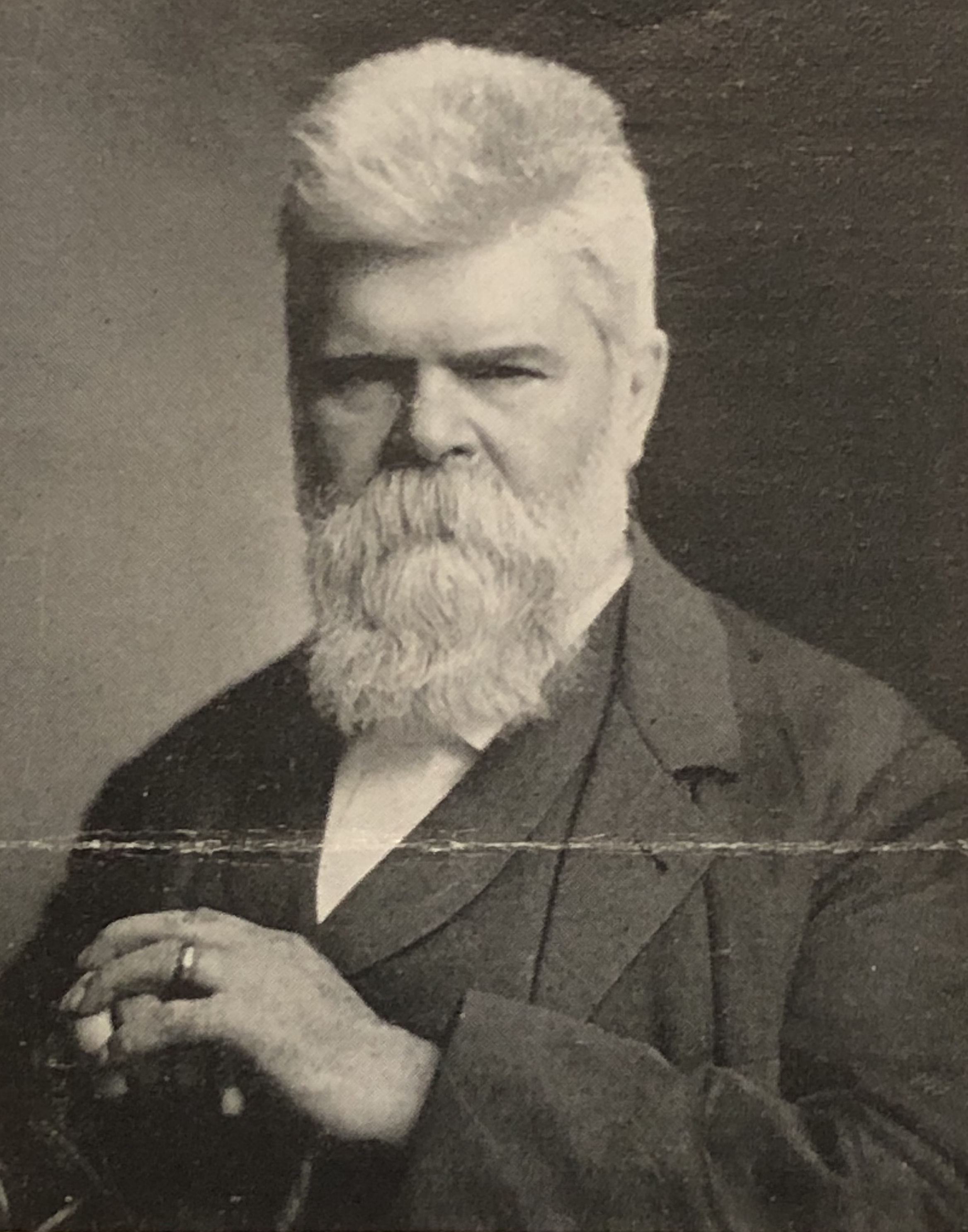
- Born: July 14, 1827; Lindau, Kingdom of Bavaria
- Died: February 28, 1907 (age 80); Chicago, Illinois
- Resting place: Graceland Cemetery
- Education: University of Tübingen
- Occupations: Journalist, editor, abolitionist
- Known for: Illinois Staats-Zeitung, Baltimore Wecker
- Political party: Republican

Wilhelm Georg Rapp (1827–1907) was a Jewish German American journalist, abolitionist, and newspaper editor. He was born in Lindau, Bavaria, but grew up in Baden. As a student at University of Tübingen Rapp participated in the German revolution of 1848, and was imprisoned for a year for his activities. Upon his release Rapp lived in Switzerland, where he taught school before emigrating to the United States in 1852.

Rapp edited Die Turnzeitung in Philadelphia and Cincinnati, then moved to Baltimore in 1857 to become editor of the Baltimore Wecker. Rapp's anti-secessionist and anti-slavery views made him the target of mob violence, and in 1861 he narrowly escaped lynching by fleeing to Washington D.C. disguised as a minister.

While in Washington, Rapp met with Abraham Lincoln, who offered him the position of postmaster general. Rapp declined, instead moving to Chicago to work for the Illinois Staats-Zeitung. In 1891, upon the death of his friend, chief editor Hermann Raster, Rapp accepted the position and stayed as editor until his death at age 80 as a result of a streetcar accident on February 28, 1907. He and his wife Gesine had three daughters: Emilie, Frida, and Mathilda, and a son, William Jr.

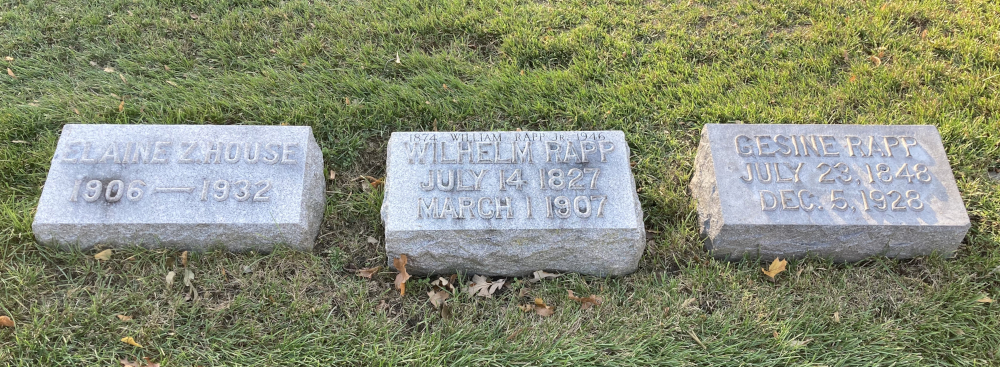
Rapp's grave

== Sources ==
- Barbara Gant: Rapp, Wilhelm Georg. In: Neue Deutsche Biographie, vol. 21, Berlin 2003, pp. 153–154 (German)

Preceded by Hermann Raster	Editor in Chief of the Illinois Staats-Zeitung; 1891–1907	Succeeded by Arthur Lorenz
