= Garrick Theater (Chicago) =

Theater in Chicago, Illinois (1891–1961)

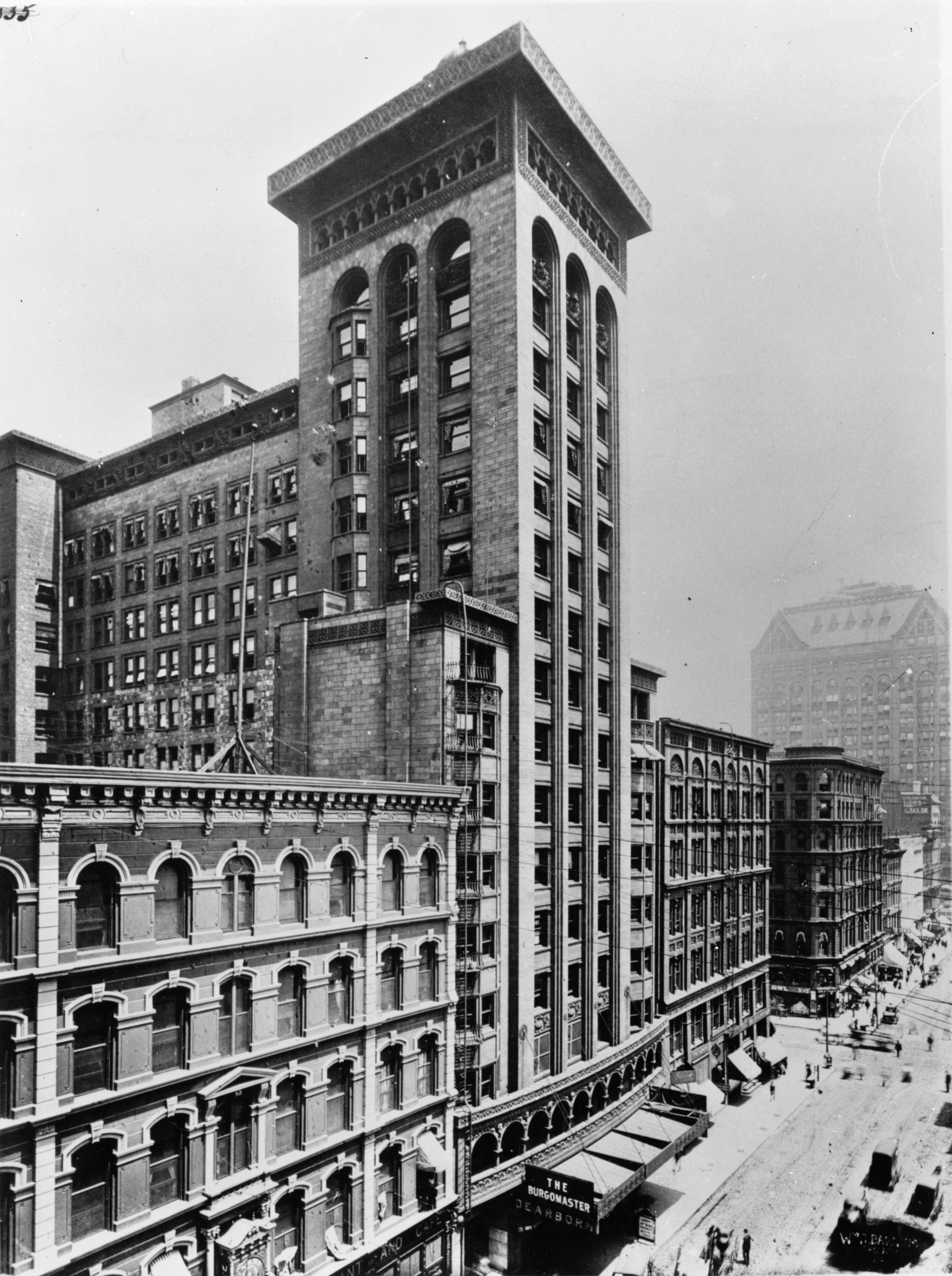
- c. 1900
- Interactive map of Garrick Theater
- Former names: Schiller Theater Building, Dearborn Theater
- Location: 64 W. Randolph Street, Chicago, Illinois
- Coordinates: 41°53′5″N 87°37′50″W
- Owner: Balaban & Katz
- Capacity: 1,300
- Type: Indoor theater

Construction
- Opened: 1891
- Demolished: 1961

The Schiller Theater Building was designed by Louis Sullivan and Dankmar Adler of the firm Adler & Sullivan for the German Opera Company. At the time of its construction, it was among the tallest buildings in Chicago. Its centerpiece was a 1,300-seat theater, which is considered by architectural historians to be one of the greatest collaborations between Adler and Sullivan.

== History ==
=== Establishment ===
floor plan of the theater

Opened in 1891, the Schiller Theater was originally funded by former Illinois Staats-Zeitung publisher Anton C. Hesing (1823–1895) and other German investors and was projected to be used for German-language operas and cultural events. One of the more tangible references to its German heritage was a series of terra cotta busts of prominent German figures on the second story arcade. A portion of this arcade is now integrated into the façade of The Second City's theater in Chicago.

=== Name changes ===
The theater changed its name and duties over the following decades. It was briefly known as the Dearborn Theater from 1898 to 1903, until finally settling on the name Garrick Theater. After German investors backed out of the project in the late 1890s, it ceased its German performances, and exhibited touring stage shows. In the 1930s the theater was acquired by Balaban & Katz who converted it into a movie theater. It became a television studio in 1950 and returned to screening movies in 1957.

=== Demise ===
After a long decline that began in the 1930s, the Garrick was razed early in 1961 and replaced with a parking structure. The demolition instigated a large outcry and is considered to be one of the first wide-scale preservation efforts in Chicago. Photographer and historic preservationist Richard Nickel was able to salvage hundreds of artifacts and ornaments from the building before and during its demolition, as well as record extensive notes, diagrams, and photographs of the structure.
