= Charles Francis Pietsch =

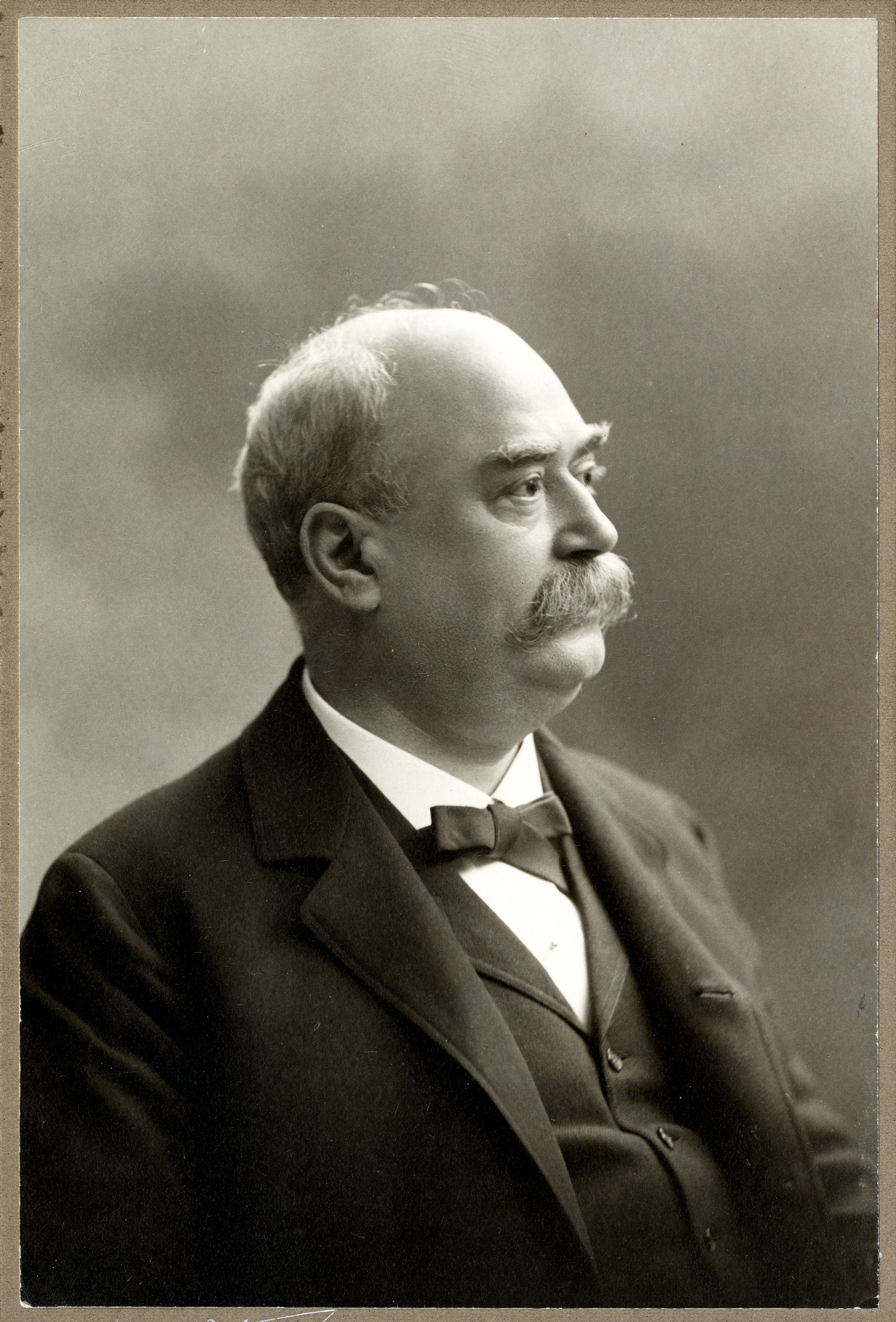
- Charles Francis Pietsch, about 1915
- Born: October 6, 1844; Baltimore, Maryland
- Died: May 7, 1920 (aged 75); Chicago, Illinois
- Burial place: Graceland Cemetery
- Occupations: Publisher, businessman
- Known for: Illinois Staats-Zeitung, Das Wochenblatt

Charles Francis Pietsch (1844–1920), an American newspaper publisher, founder, and long-time publisher of Das Wochenblatt, a weekly American newspaper printed in the German language.

== Education and career ==
Reared in Baltimore, Maryland, and educated at the then famous Professor Scheib's School, C. F. Pietsch moved to Chicago in 1866, where, from 1867, he became associated with newspapers printed in German. From that same year, he was secretary, treasurer, and general business manager of the Illinois Staats-Zeitung (founded April 21, 1848), until he left in 1899. In 1904, he founded Das Wochenblatt, a weekly American newspaper printed in German, headquartered at 35 North Dearborn Street—"If You Can Read German, Subscribe to Das Wochenblatt, One Dollar Per Year, All Authentic News in a Nutshell"—which he was still publishing in 1920 at the time of his death. His obituary refers to him as "Chicago's oldest publisher."

== Personal life ==
Charles F. Pietsch was a lover of classical music, and during the 1870s and 1880s, he was prominent in the musical life of Chicago. Largely through his efforts, the first chamber concerts were held in Brand’s Hall in 1879, as well as the first symphonic concert in the old Central Music Hall in the following year. He was also, for many years, secretary and treasurer of the Schiller Building and Theater.

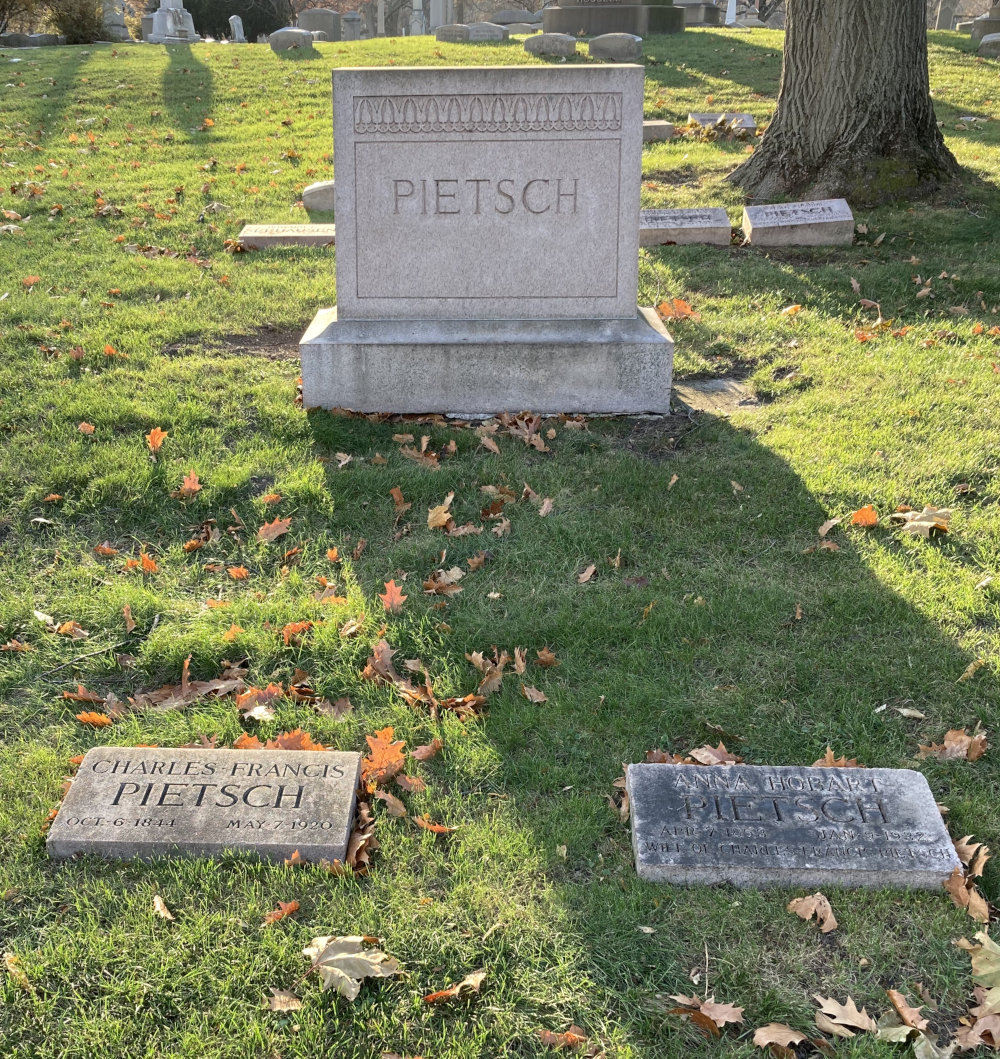
Pietsch's grave at Graceland Cemetery

On June 14, 1866, he married Florence Augusta Wells (whose parents were originally from Connecticut, but settled in Maryland prior to the outbreak of the Civil War). Born November 11, 1845, at Baltimore, Florence died on March 20, 1877, after a prolonged illness at the home of her parents. On January 2, 1879, Pietsch married for a second time, to Anna Hobart (born April 7, 1853, at Chicago, died January 9, 1932). She was active in charity and a member of the Chicago Woman's Club. On Friday, May 7, 1920, Pietsch died of pneumonia. He was buried on May 10, 1920, in the Pietsch lot at Graceland Cemetery, Chicago. He was survived by three sons from his first marriage: Frank Hesing Pietsch (May 27, 1867, Chicago – February 10, 1939, Chicago), Theodore Wells Pietsch (October 2, 1868, Chicago – January 1, 1930, Baltimore), and Walter Gray Pietsch (January 27, 1875, Chicago – December 14, 1938, Chicago).
