= Lorenzo Brentano =

German revolutionary turned American politician (1813-1891)

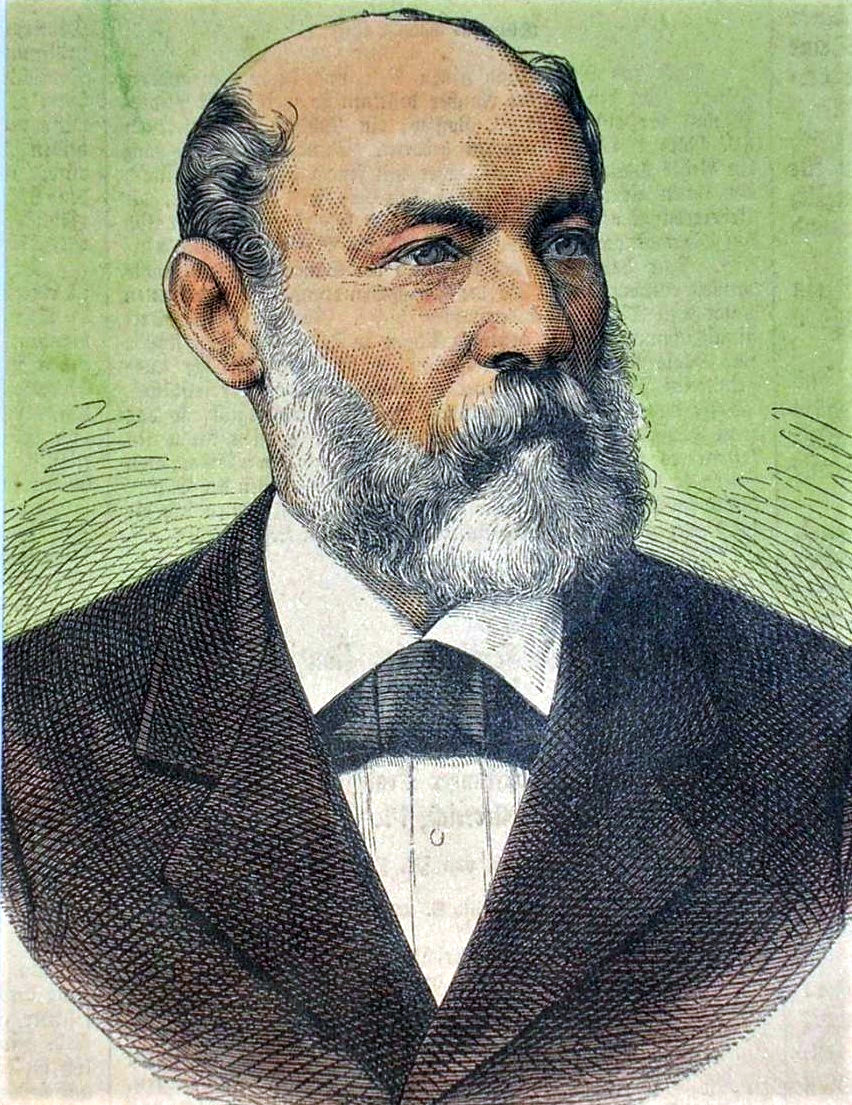
- Brentano in 1878

Member of the U.S. House of Representatives from Illinois's 3rd district
- In office March 4, 1877 – March 3, 1879
- Preceded by: John V. Le Moyne
- Succeeded by: Hiram Barber, Jr.

President of the Chicago Board of Education
- In office 1867–1868
- Preceded by: George C. Clarke
- Succeeded by: John Wentworth or S. A. Briggs

President of the Free State of Baden
- In office 1849–1849
- Preceded by: Office established
- Succeeded by: Ludwik Mierosławski

Personal details
- Born: November 4, 1813 Mannheim, Grand Duchy of Baden, Germany
- Died: September 18, 1891 (aged 77) Chicago, Illinois, U.S.
- Party: Republican
- Children: Theodore
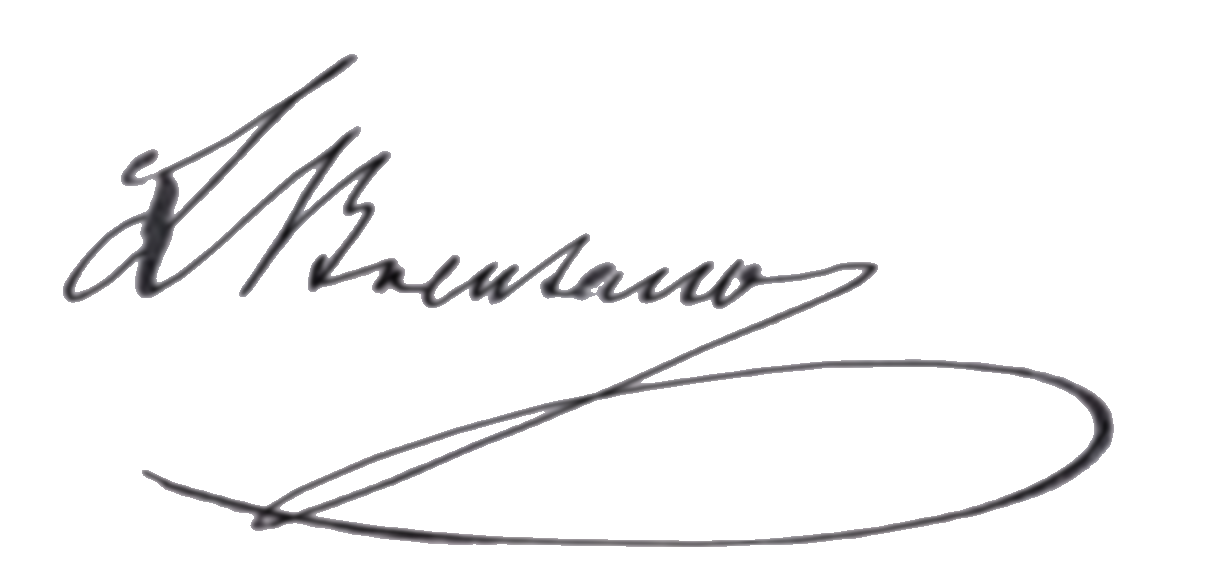
- Signature

Lorenzo Brentano (November 4, 1813 – September 18, 1891) was a German revolutionary and journalist who served as president of the Grand Duchy of Baden's revolutionary government during the 1849 Baden Revolution. Following the failure of the revolutions, he and many other intellectuals and leaders fled to the United States, where he became editor of the Illinois Staats-Zeitung and eventually served as a member of the United States House of Representatives from Illinois.

== Biography ==
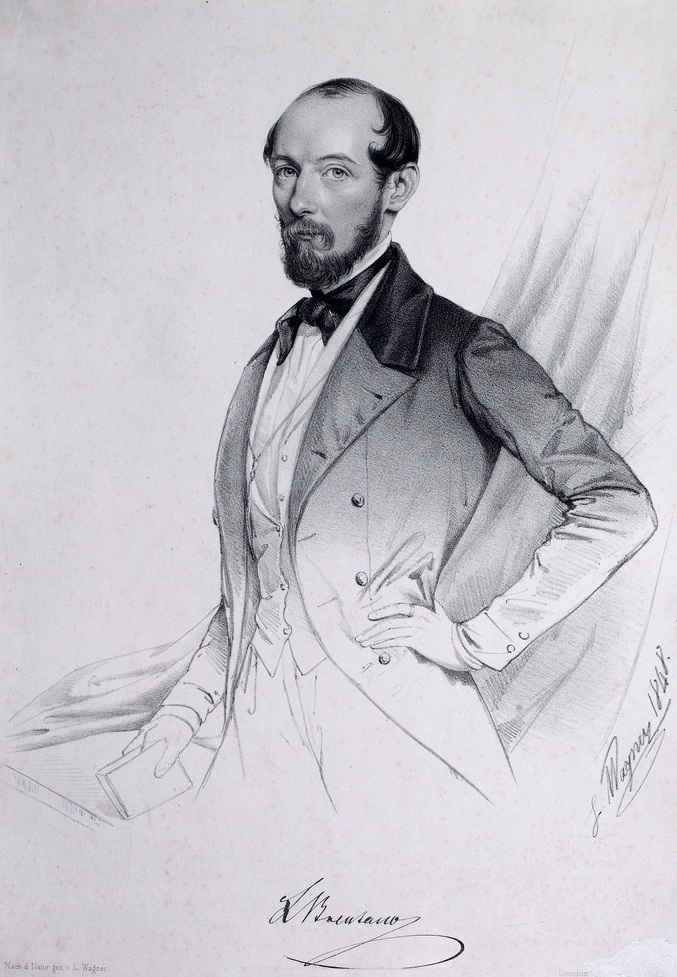
Lorenz Brentano in 1848

Born as Lorenz Peter Carl Brentano in Mannheim, Grand Duchy of Baden, Germany, Brentano received a thorough classical training and studied jurisprudence at the Universities of Heidelberg and Freiburg. He practiced before the supreme court of Baden.

Brentano was elected to the Chamber of Deputies and in 1848 to the Frankfurt Parliament. In early 1849, revolutionaries elected him mayor of Mannheim, but the Duke of Baden refused to recognize him.

In April 1849, the Duke of Baden was pressed into signing the Frankfurt Constitution by the Imperial Constitution campaign, but this was not enough for the revolutionaries. On 13 May 1849 a popular assembly in Offenburg announced a new governing body for Baden and elected Brentano its president, and that night, the Duke fled the country, fearing an imminent republican revolution. Ironically, Brentano (who had not participated in the assembly) did not support republicanism and wished to bring back the duke to form a constitutional monarchy under the Frankfurt Constitution; he was in the minority among the elected officials, causing arguments in the short-lived democratic government.

The new government seized Karlsruhe, as most of Baden's military officers left with the duke, but it had to prepare to fight the combined forces of Prussia, Württemberg, and the duchy in exile. Brentano, an experienced jurist, handled most of the internal affairs of state, while his two co-leaders (as appointed on 10 June) limited themselves to military affairs. Although they planned strategically to link with other revolutionary governments, their forces fell short, and on 25 June the Prussian forces forced the revolutionary government to retreat to Rastatt. On 28 June, having lost confidence in the abilities of the provisional government, Brentano resigned and fled to Switzerland. Brentano's pugilistic allies announced the "provisional government of Baden with dictatorial powers," which retreated again to Offenburg and then to Freiburg im Breisgau, then continued to fight Prussia until it was defeated on 23 July.

On 6 June 1850, the Grand Duchy sentenced Brentano to imprisonment for life in absentia. From Switzerland, he found refuge in the United States via Switzerland.

=== Life in America ===
He established Der Leuchtturm, a German anti-slavery journal, in Pottsville, Pennsylvania. He settled in Kalamazoo County, Michigan, and engaged in agricultural pursuits. He moved to Chicago, Illinois, in 1859. He was admitted to the bar in 1859 and commenced practice in Chicago. He became editor-in-chief and principal proprietor of the Illinois Staats-Zeitung from 1862 to 1867. The paper was sold in 1867, and Hermann Raster took over Brentano's position as editor. He served as member of the Illinois House of Representatives in 1862, as a member of the Chicago Board of Education 1862–1868 (serving as its president in 1867 and 1868), and as a delegate to the 1864 Republican National Convention. In 1868 he was presidential elector on the Grant and Colfax ticket.

In 1869, a general amnesty having been granted to the revolutionists of 1849, he revisited his native land. He was appointed United States consul at Dresden in 1872 and served until April 1876. Brentano's son Theodore would become the first American ambassador to Hungary.

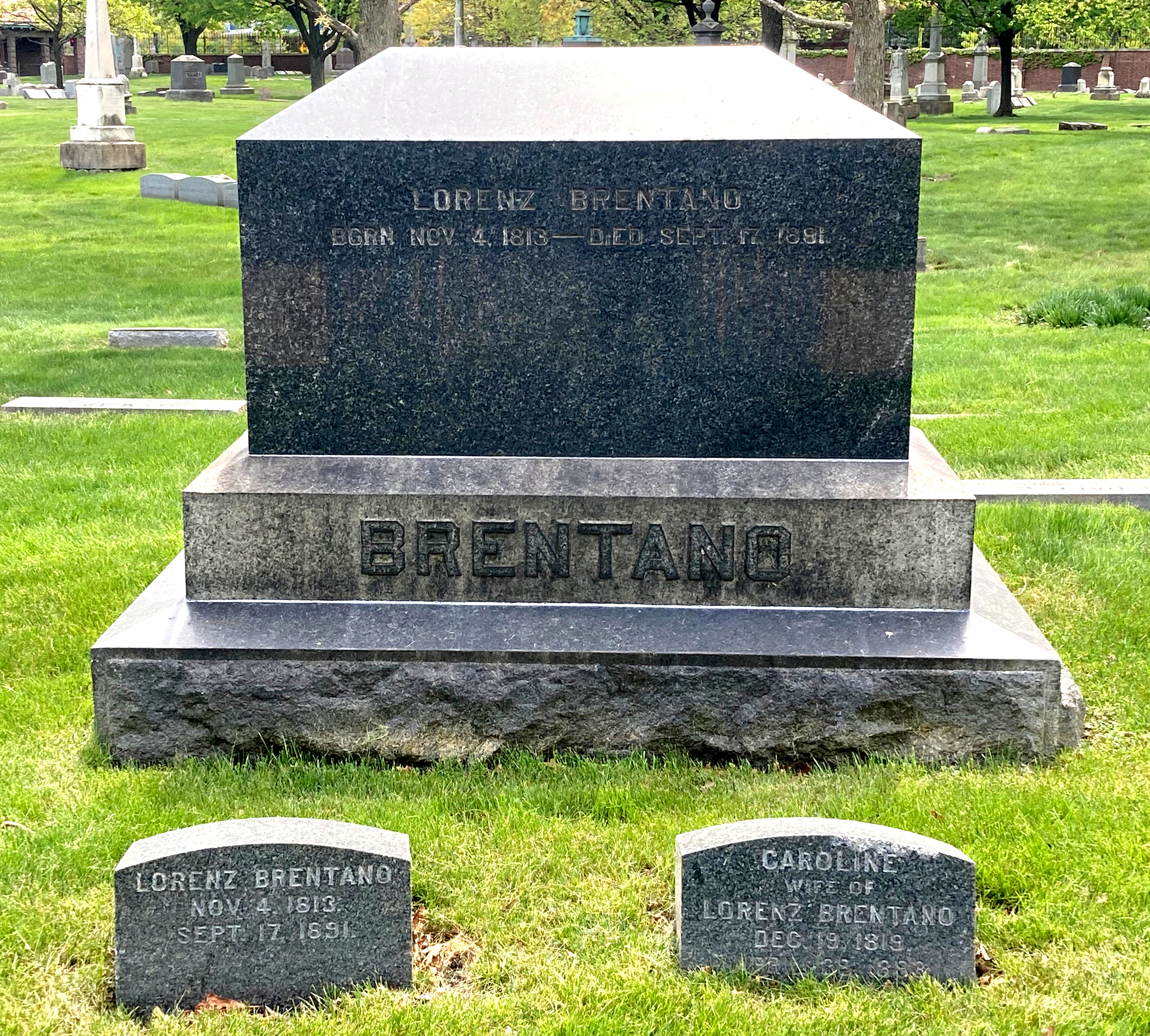
Brentano's grave at Graceland Cemetery

Brentano was elected as a Republican to the Forty-fifth Congress (March 4, 1877 – March 3, 1879). He was an unsuccessful candidate for renomination in 1878. After leaving Congress, he engaged in literary and historical research designed to compare and contrast the American and European codes of criminal procedure. In this line of work he published a report of the trial of the assassin of President Garfield, and a history of the celebrated case of Kring v. Missouri (see List of United States Supreme Court cases, volume 107).

He died in Chicago, and was interred in Graceland Cemetery.

== Notes ==
U.S. House of Representatives
Preceded by John V. Le Moyne	Member of the U.S. House of Representatives from Illinois's 3rd congressional district 1877-1879	Succeeded by Hiram Barber, Jr.

Preceded by George Schneider	Editor in Chief of the Illinois Staats-Zeitung; 1861-1867	Succeeded by Hermann Raster
