= Illinois Staats-Zeitung =

German-American newspaper

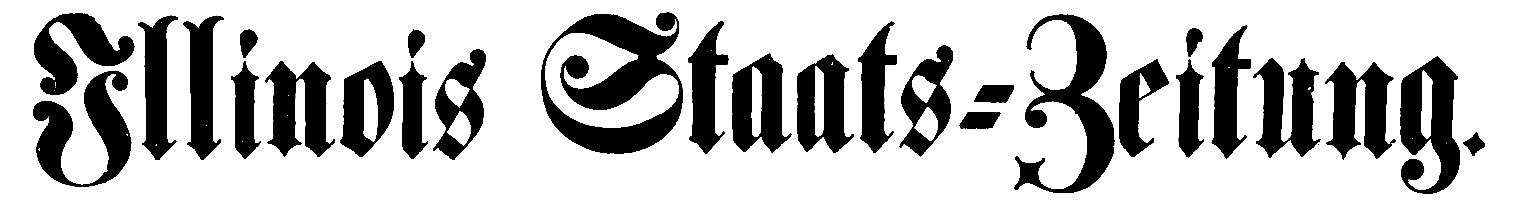

- The massive Illinois Staats-Zeitung building constructed after the Great Chicago Fire of 1871
- Type: Daily German-language newspaper
- Owner: A. C. Hesing
- Publisher: S.S. Spielman (until 1921)
- Editor-in-chief: Hermann Kriege (1848–1850); George Schneider (1851–1861); Lorenz Brentano (1861–1867); Hermann Raster (1867–1891); Wilhelm Rapp (1891–1907); Arthur Lorenz (1907–1921)
- Managing editor: Washington Hesing (1880–1893); Joseph Brucker (1894–1901)
- Founded: April 1848
- Ceased publication: 1921
- Political alignment: Republican Party (until 1873); People's Party (1873–1875); Independent (after 1876)
- Language: German
- Headquarters: Chicago
- Circulation: 97,000 (1892)

Illinois Staats-Zeitung (Illinois State Newspaper) was one of the most well-known German-language newspapers of the United States; it was published in Chicago from 1848 until 1922. Along with the Westliche Post and Anzeiger des Westens, both of St. Louis, it was one of the three most successful German-language newspapers in the United States Midwest, and described as "the leading Republican paper of the Northwest", alongside the Chicago Tribune. By 1876, the paper was printing 14,000 copies an hour and was second only to the Tribune in citywide circulation.

== Publication history ==
=== Establishment ===
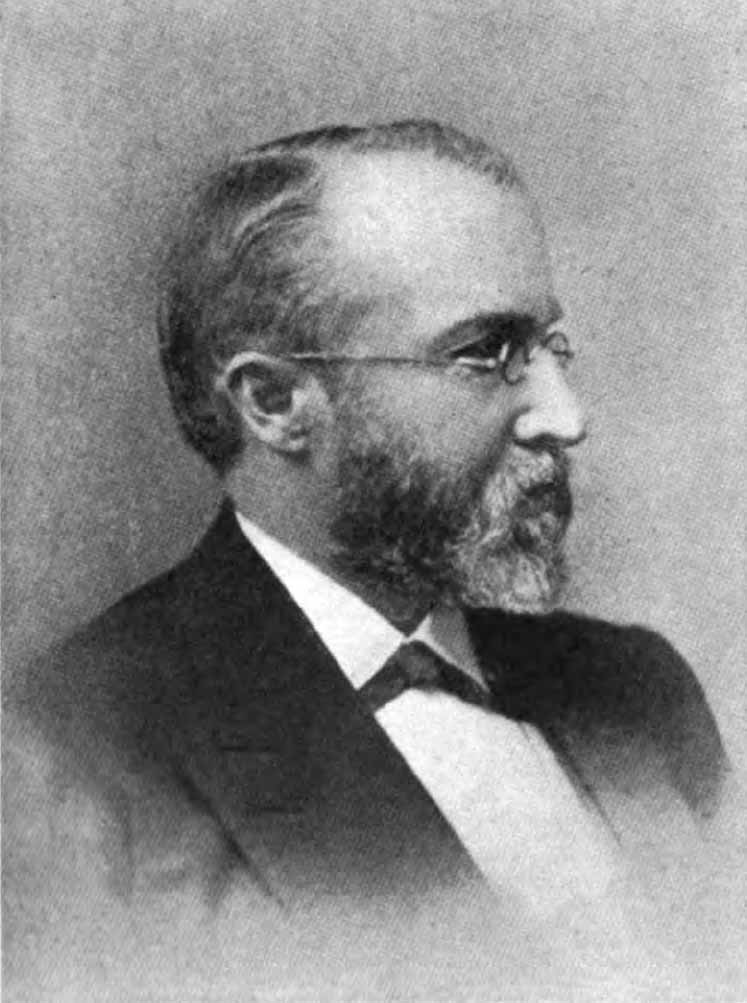
George Schneider, editor from 1851 to 1861

The Illinois Staats-Zeitung was founded in April 1848 as a weekly, and became a daily in 1851.

Politically, the newspaper was Republican. Hermann Kriege was the first editor-in-chief. In the 1850s, the paper was taken over by Forty-Eighters and became a major daily newspaper of the Chicago German-born community. In 1851, Georg Schneider joined the staff of the paper and became editor. Among his associates were George Hillgärtner and Daniel Hertel. Schneider played a major role in building the Republican Party in Illinois, a work in which the Illinois Staats-Zeitung played an important function.

The Illinois Staats-Zeitung opposed slavery, and Schneider successfully used the newspaper as a platform to campaign against the Kansas–Nebraska Act. On February 22, 1856 Schneider attended, on behalf of the Illinois Staats-Zeitung, a meeting in Decatur of anti-Nebraska newspapers in Illinois. In total, 26 newspapers were represented at the meeting, assembled by the Morgan Journal editor Paul Selby.

=== Civil War period ===
Anton C. Hesing was the owner of the Staats-Zeitung from 1867 until his retirement in the 1880s.

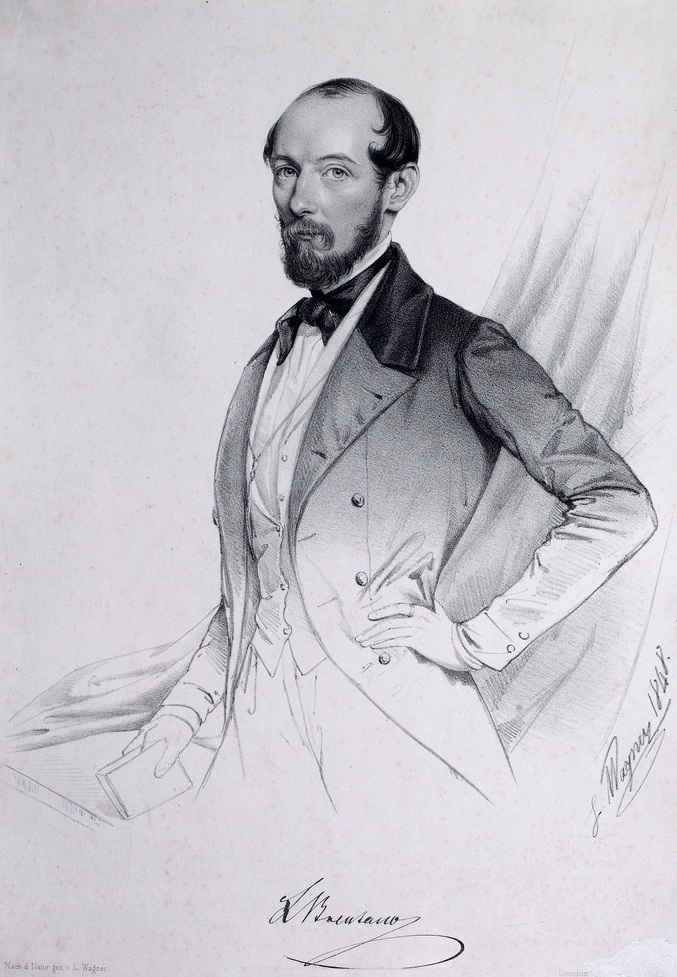
Lorenz Brentano, editor of the Staats-Zeitung 1861 to 1867

During the Civil War years, Lorenz Brentano was proprietor and editor-in-chief, succeeding Schneider. In these years, the paper fully dominated German-language press in the city, as Democratic German-language newspapers were short-lived at the time. At this point, Illinois Staats-Zeitung was the second-largest daily newspaper in the Chicago.

During the war, Wilhelm Rapp was on the staff. He came from the Baltimore Wecker after a riot destroyed its office. After the war, he returned to the Wecker.

In the years after the war, the Staats-Zeitung was published by Prussian immigrant Anton C. Hesing, a former sheriff of Cook County, who moved from partial ownership to complete ownership in 1867. A public figure and political boss of sorts, Hesing would use the pages of his paper for maximum political impact, helping to launch the pro-alcohol People's Party in 1873 and orchestrating the election of Harvey Doolittle Colvin as the 27th mayor of Chicago. Hesing's independent political venture would fall into disrepute within a few years and the Staats-Zeitung returned to the Republican ranks.

Concurrent with Hesing's assumption of the paper's ownership in 1867, Hermann Raster accepted the position of editor — a position he would retain until his death in 1891. Raster was the longest holder of this position, and the paper was at the peak of its financial success during his tenure. Wilhelm Rapp returned to the Staats-Zeitung in 1872, and became editor when Raster died in 1891.

=== Great Chicago Fire ===
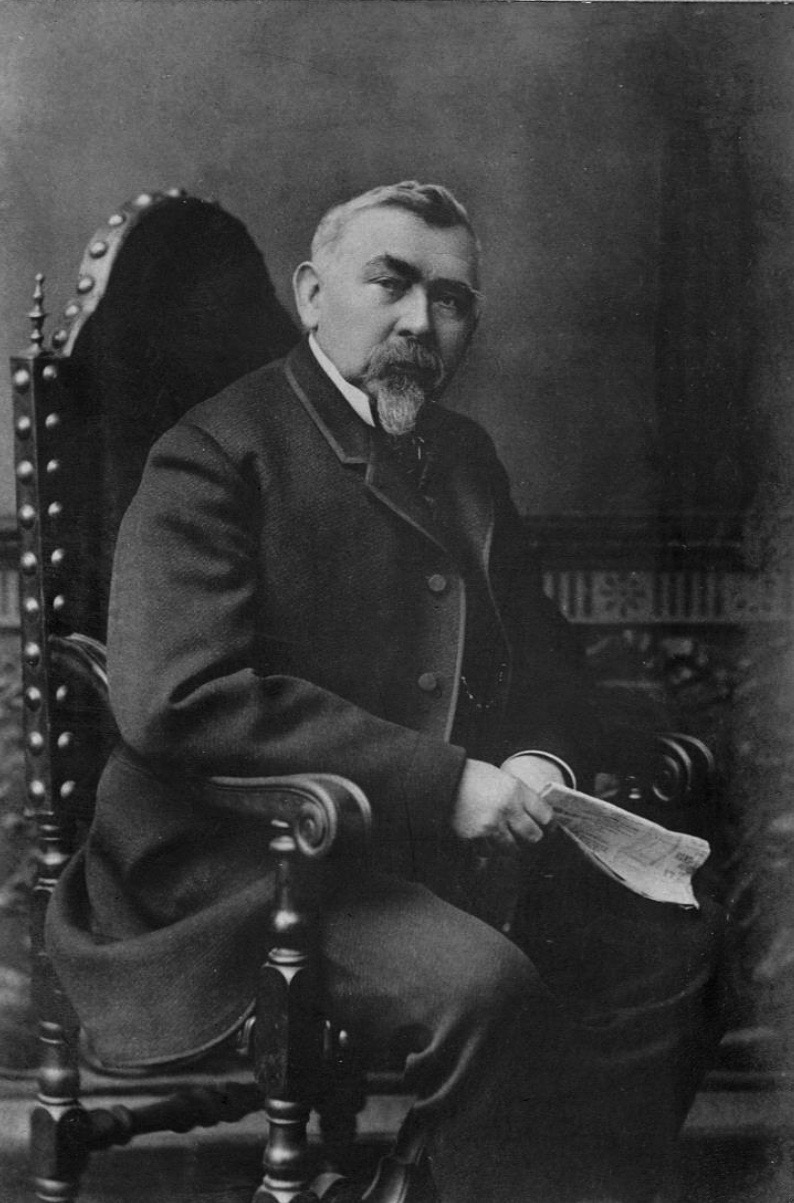
Hermann Raster, editor from 1867 to 1891

The Staats-Zeitung was particularly hard hit during the October 1871 Great Chicago Fire. Not only was the building housing the publication, including its machinery and type, lost to the flames, but so, too, were back files of the paper and the publication's records of accounts. Moreover, virtually the entire staff of the paper from editors to press operators found themselves burned out of their homes.

Necessary lead type for producing a German-language paper proved impossible to obtain on short notice, and as a temporary measure, production was moved briefly to the German enclave of Milwaukee, Wisconsin. After a mere 20 days, production returned to a new press in a new facility in Chicago, the city in which the paper would remain for the rest of its existence, with an expansion of physical size following one month later.

A new permanent home for the paper was finally located about one mile away from the Chicago city center, in a new multistory structure built at the corner of Washington Street and Fifth Avenue. The building measured 100 feet from the basement floor to the peak of the roof, making it one of the largest buildings in its area of town, and was designed with the monumental sensibilities of old Europe.

Historically Republican, the newspaper endorsed Democratic candidate Samuel J. Tilden in the 1876 United States presidential election. However, it remained officially independent from that point forward, criticizing equally both major American parties.

After Hesing, Brentano, and Raster died at the end of the 19th century, the paper began to decline. In 1899, the majority stockholders of the paper created a new board of directors and ousted long-time treasurer Charles Francis Pietsch. Henrietta Hesing and Margarethe Raster, the widows of Washington Hesing and Hermann Raster, controlled the property of the Staats-Zeitung, and Lorenz Brentano's son Theodore became new treasurer.

=== World War I and termination ===
Until the United States became involved in World War I, the Illinois Staats-Zeitung supported the German war effort. Editor Arthur Lorenz was reportedly "unrestrained" in his support for the Germans, and the paper lost a great deal of advertising and funding as a result. By the late 1910s, it was in dire financial straits and garnered significant controversy when it ran an article describing members of the American Legion as vagabonds and bums and that the legion had been "bought with British gold to betray American labor." In 1921, the paper was sold for $25,000 and Colonel John Clinnin, assistant United States district attorney, recommended deportation proceedings for Lorenz. The paper was resurrected as Deutsch-Amerikanische Bürger-Zeitung. A short time before, the Chicagoer Freie Presse had merged with the paper.

=== Illinois Staats-Herold ===
Following the sale of the Staats-Zeitung, the paper was resurrected and merged with the Chicagoer Herold in the late 1920s to form the Illinois Staats-Herold. The Staats-Herold's circulation was around 40,000 by 1934, but the paper again ceased publication around 1936. It was the first German newspaper in Chicago to host a German broadcasting hour on the radio. The president of the Staats-Herold was Ernest L. Klein and the editor-in-chief was Julius Klein. Like its predecessor, the Staats-Herold was Republican-affiliated.

== Staff ==
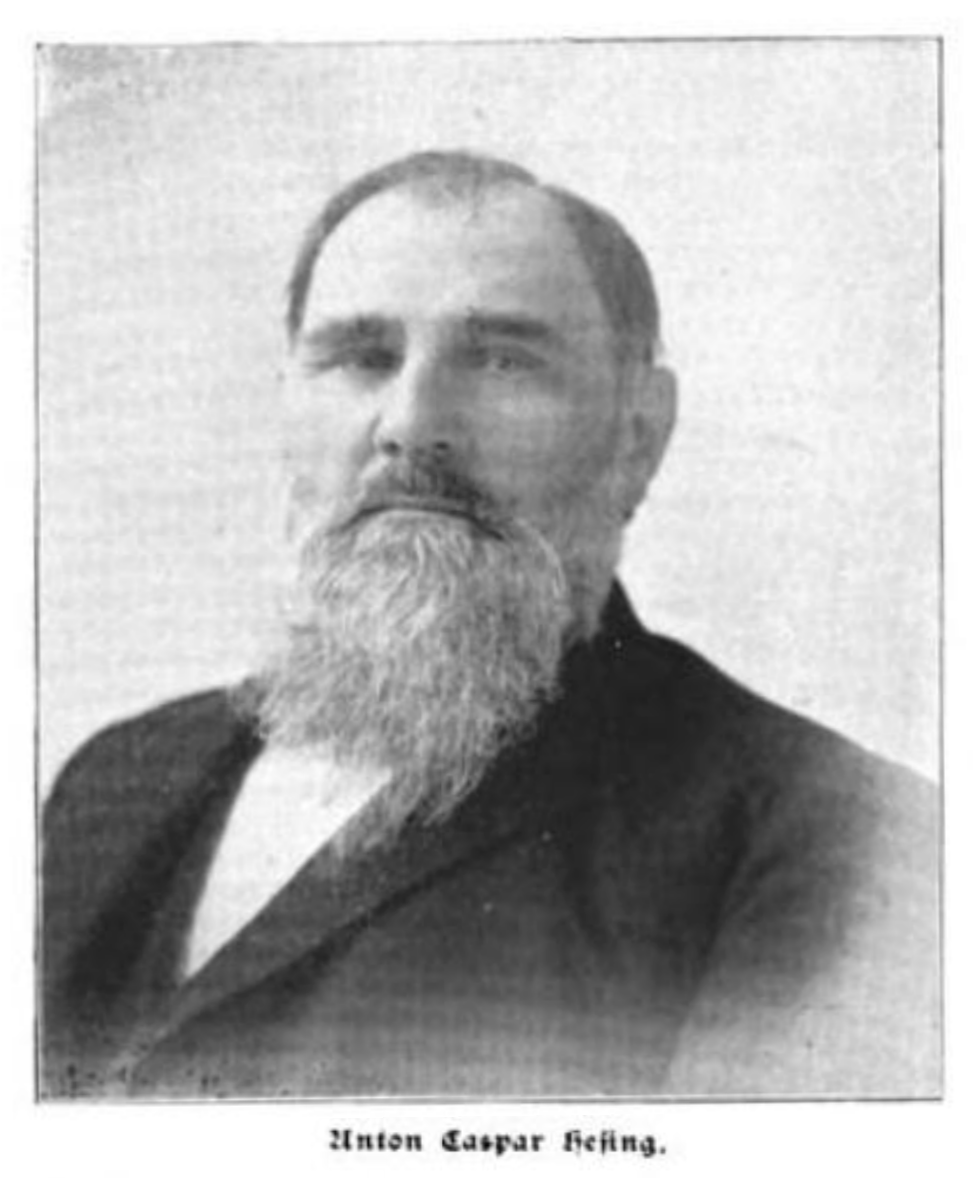
Anton C. Hesing
Owner

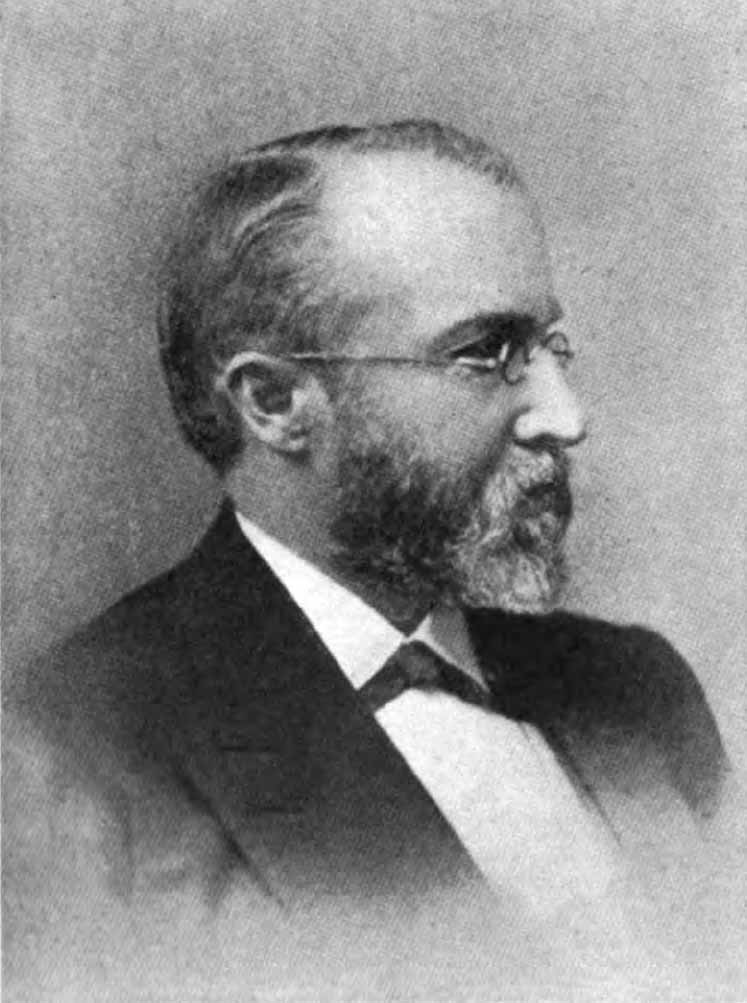
George Schneider
Chief editor from 1851 to 1861

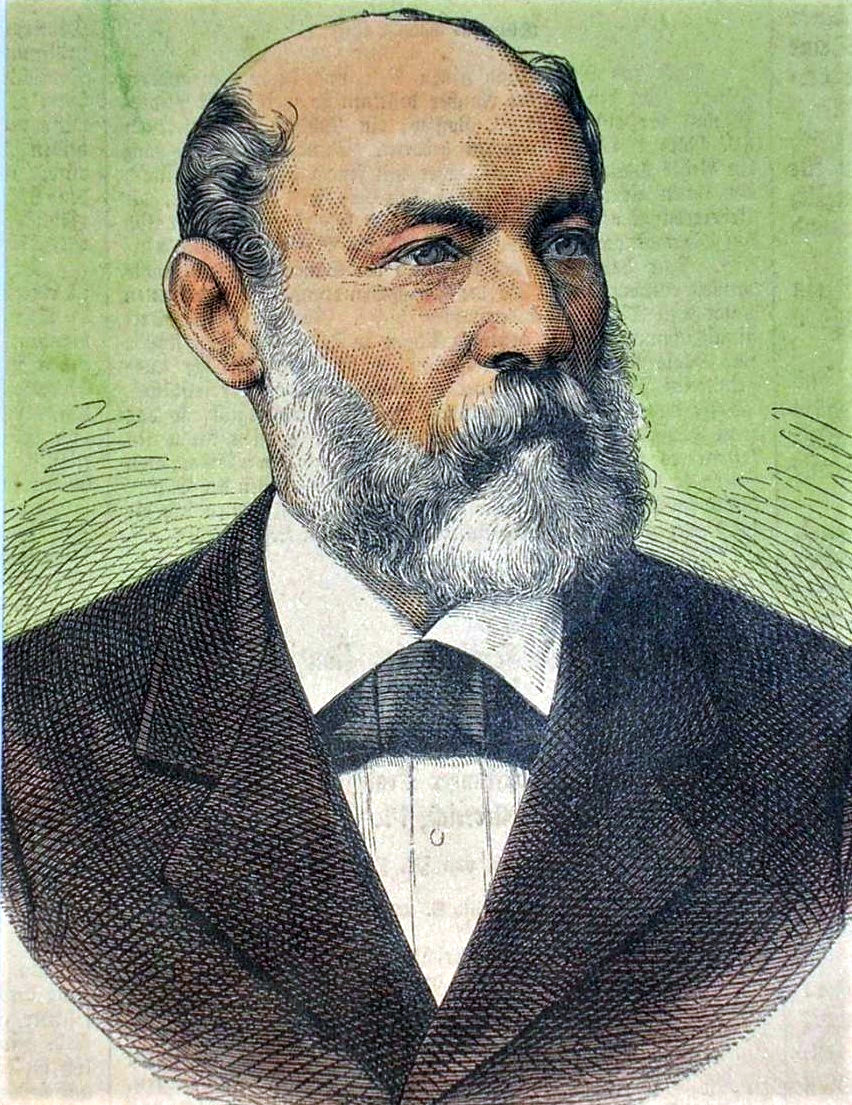
Lorenzo Brentano
Chief editor from 1861 to 1867

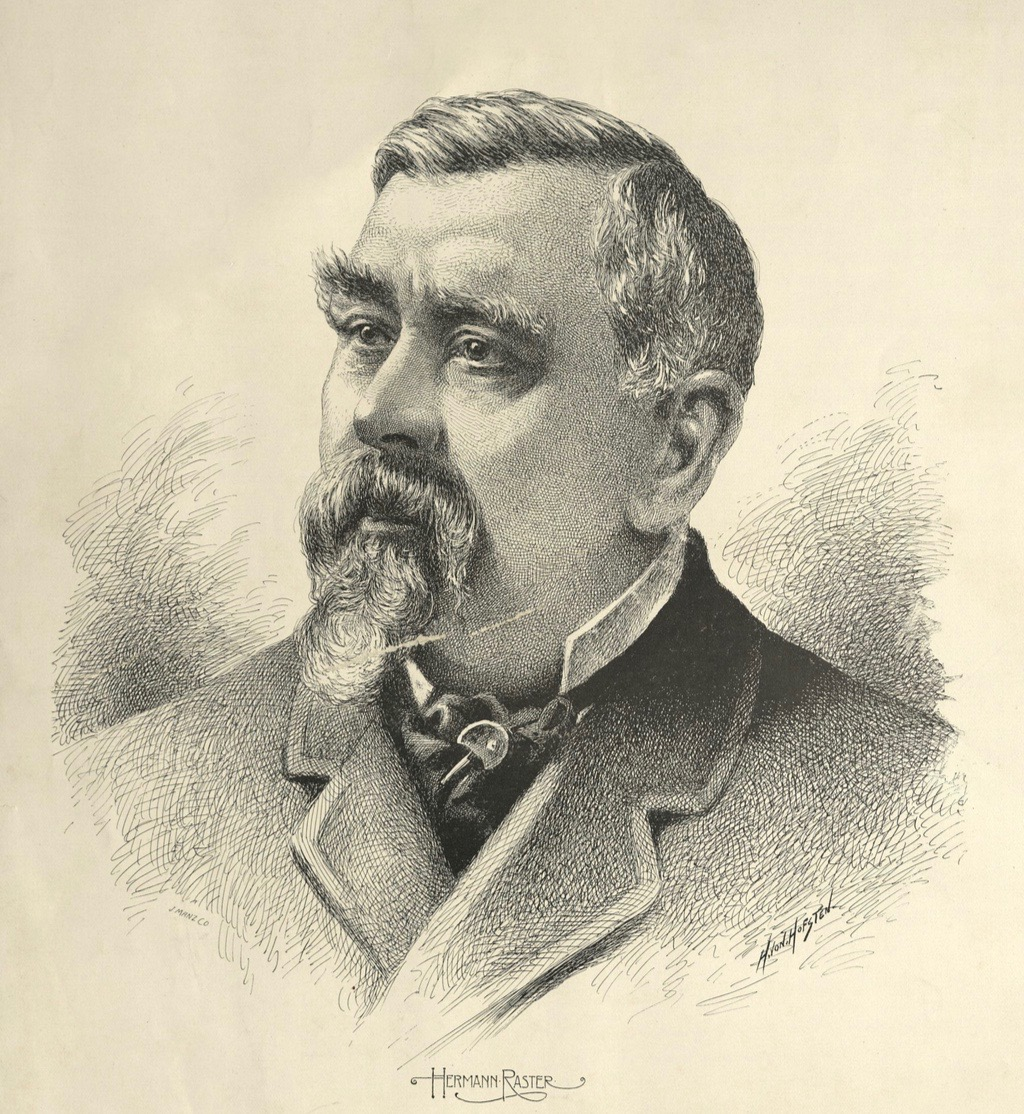
Hermann Raster
Chief editor from 1867 to 1891

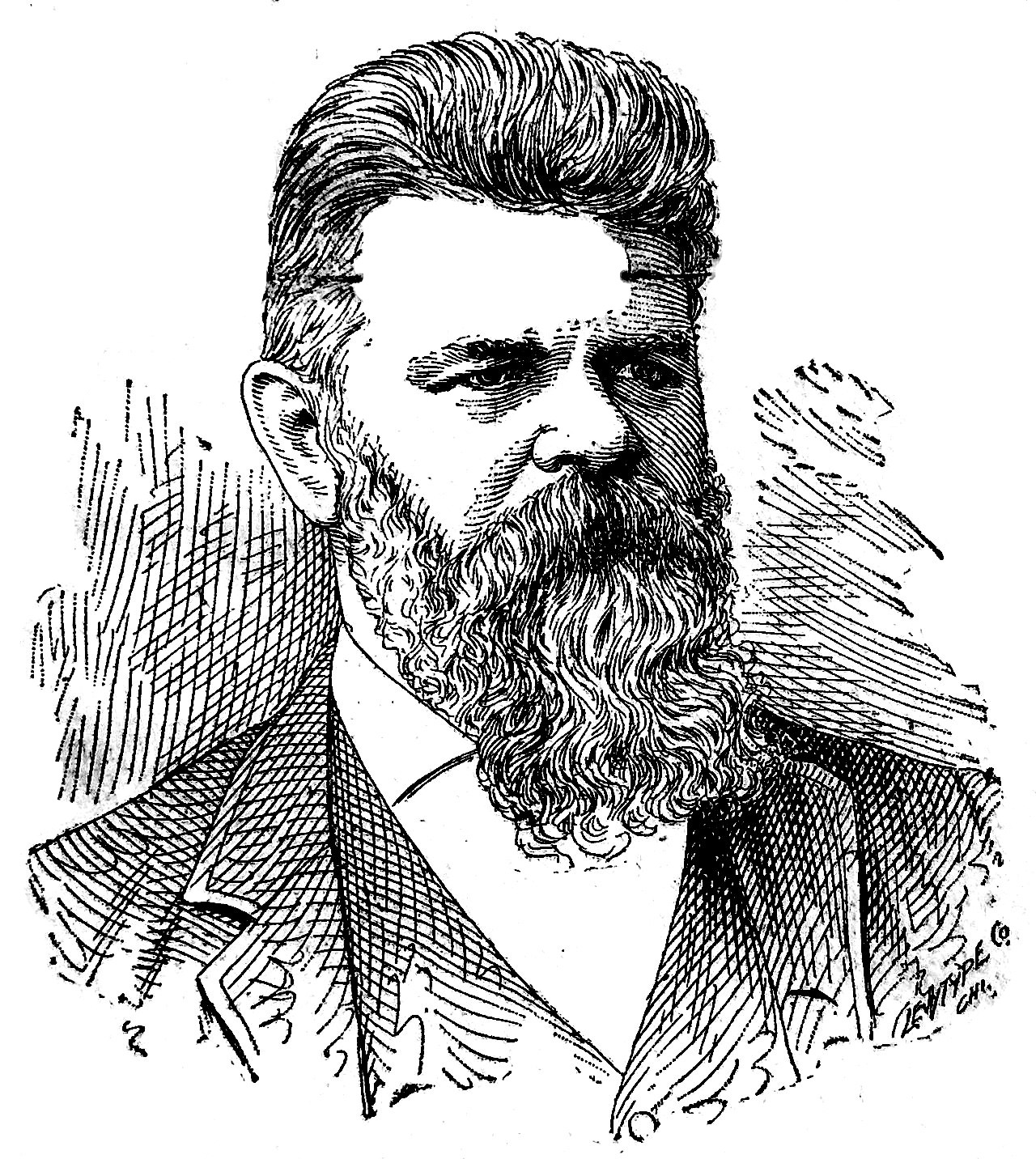
Wilhelm Rapp
Chief editor from 1891 to 1907

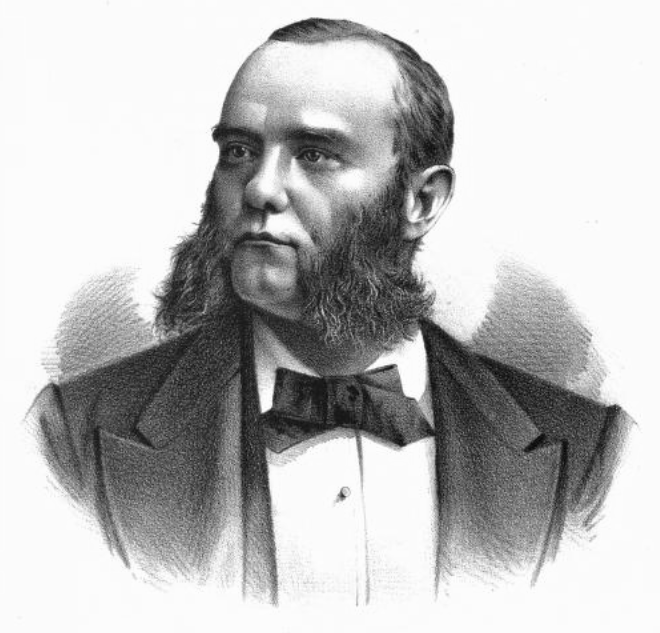
Washington Hesing
Managing editor from 1880 to 1893

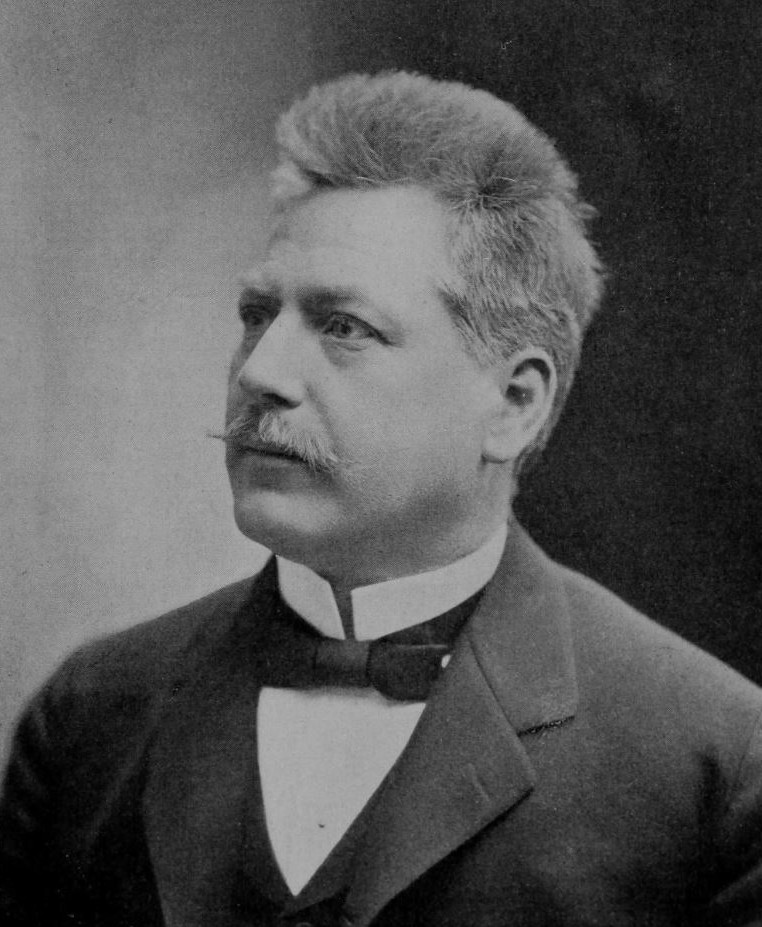
Joseph Brucker
Managing editor from 1894 to 1901

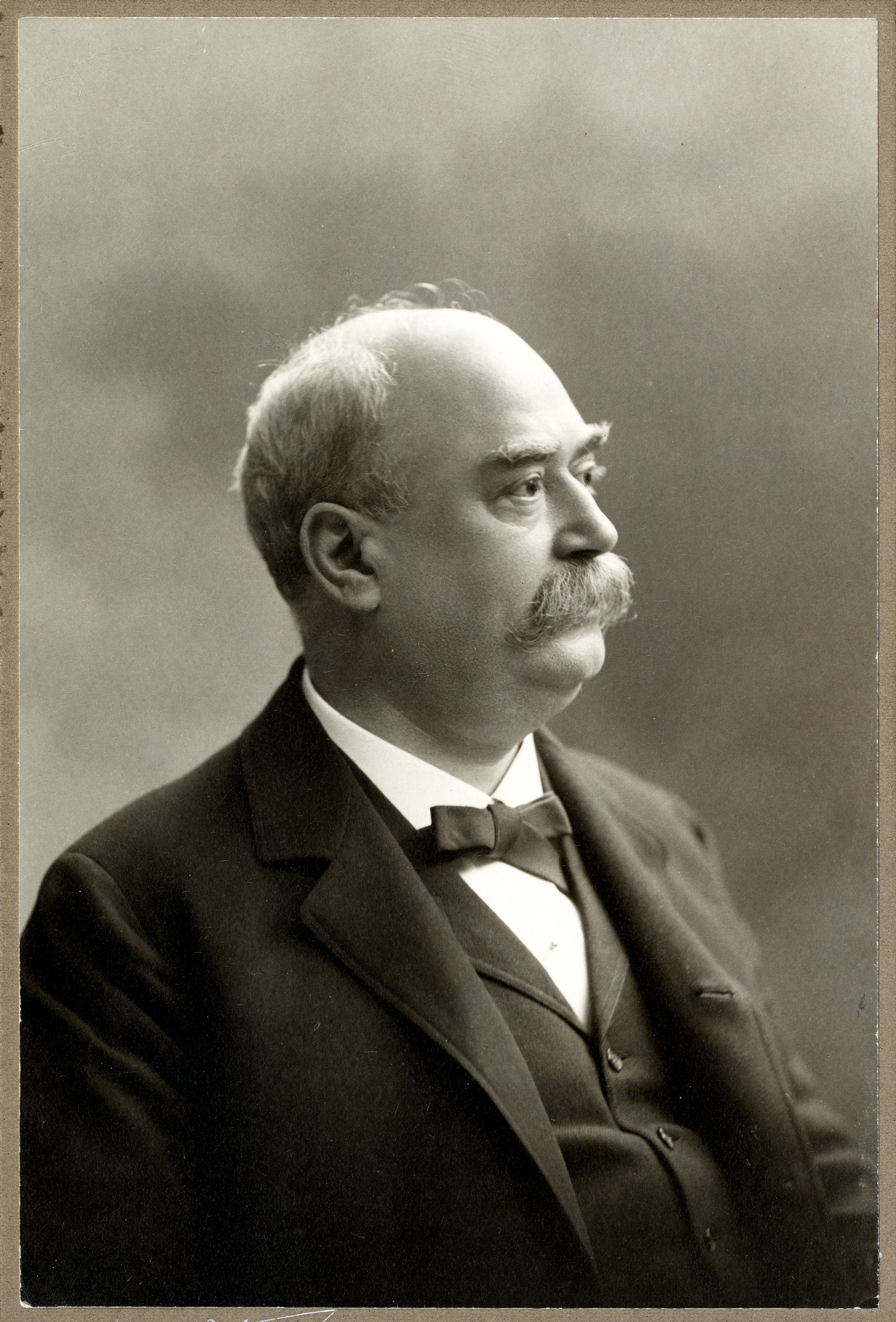
Charles Francis Pietsch
Treasurer until 1899

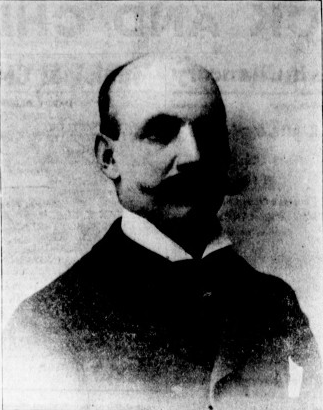
Theodore Brentano
Treasurer after 1899

In November 1871, publisher Anton Hesing's son, Washington Hesing (1849–1897), an 1870 graduate of Yale College, finished a stint as a political appointee on the Chicago Board of Education and became actively connected with the Staats-Zeitung. The younger Hesing became managing editor of the Staats-Zeitung in April 1880, by which time he was a part owner of the publication. Upon his appointment as postmaster of Chicago in 1893, Washington Hesing was replaced by notable Illinois Republican Joseph Brucker as managing editor of the paper.

Other notable members of the staff of and contributors to the Staats-Zeitung were Adolf Wiesner (who served in an editorial position from 1866 to 1867), Caspar Butz, Emil Dietzsch, August Boecklin, Henry E.O. Heinemann, Paul Grzybowski and Henry Merker. Between 1891 and 1899, the paper had a separate evening edition, Abendblatt (Evening Paper).

== See also ==
- German language newspapers in the United States
