= George Schneider (banker) =

American diplomat (1823–1905)

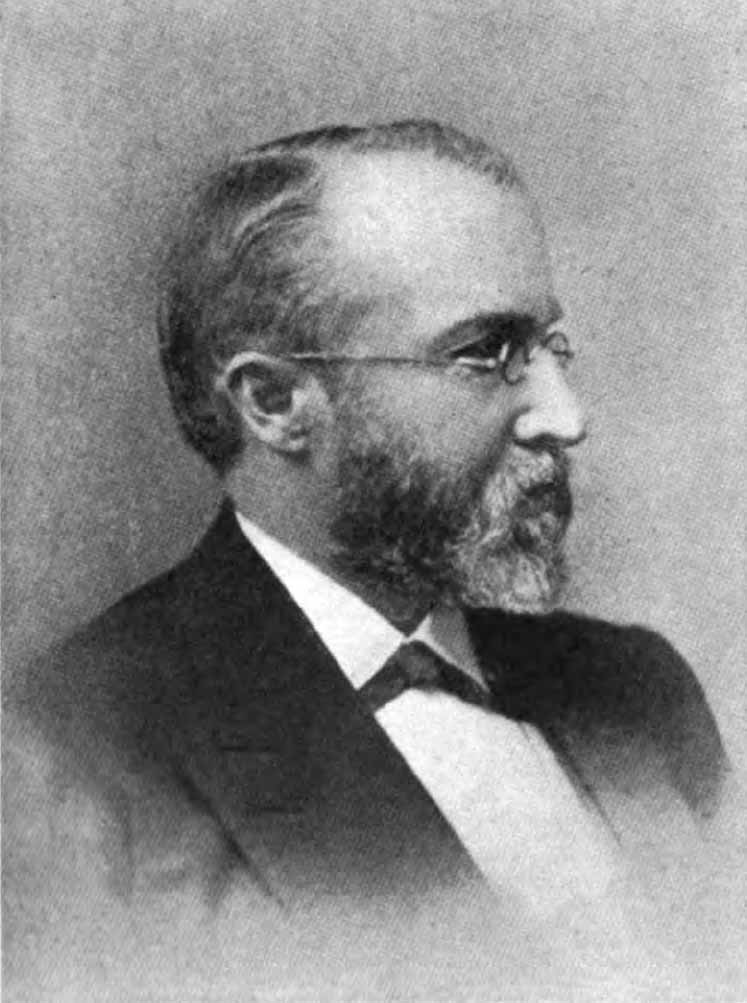

Collector of Internal Revenue for the First District of Illinois
- In office August 28, 1862 – June 26, 1866
- Appointed by: Abraham Lincoln
- Preceded by: office created
- Succeeded by: Orrin L. Mann

United States Consul at Elsinore
- In office 1861–1862
- Appointed by: Abraham Lincoln
- Succeeded by: Karl Ludwig Bernays

Personal details
- Born: December 13, 1823 Pirmasens, Rhenish Bavaria
- Died: September 16, 1905 (aged 81) Colorado Springs, Colorado, U.S.
- Occupation: Journalist; editor; banker
- Known for: Illinois Staats-Zeitung

George Schneider (1823 – 1905) was a German American journalist and banker who served as editor-in-chief of the Illinois Staats-Zeitung. He was appointed by President Abraham Lincoln as the United States Consul in Elsinore, Denmark, at the outbreak of the American Civil War and later served as Collector of Internal Revenue for the 1st District of Illinois. He was a German refugee, one of the Forty-Eighters.

== Biography ==
=== Early years ===
The son of Ludwig Schneider, a public official, and Josephine Schneider (née Schlick), he was educated in the Latin school of his native place. He became a journalist at the age of 21, and worked for several German newspapers. Strongly sympathetic with the revolutionaries of 1848, he took an active part. When the revolution in the Rhine Province was crushed by the Bavarian government's Prussian allies, he withdrew to Baden, then fled to France, and finally emigrated to the United States, arriving in New York City in July 1849.

=== Neue Zeit ===
With his brother, also an exile, he established the Neue Zeit in St. Louis, Missouri, which was devoted to the free discussion of questions of interest to the large German population of that city, including the question of slavery, to which a large majority of them were strongly opposed. During the following year the office of this paper was destroyed by fire.

=== Illinois Staats-Zeitung ===
In the next few months Schneider occupied a position as a professor of foreign languages and literature in a college in the vicinity of St. Louis. During the next year he relinquished this position and, coming to Chicago on August 28, 1851, entered upon his duties as editor of the Illinois Staats-Zeitung which had been established some four years previous. He remained there over ten years, in 1852 becoming the proprietor of a half interest in the paper.

It was during his connection with the Staats-Zeitung that the contest over the slavery question was precipitated by the repeal of the Missouri Compromise as a consequence of the adoption of the Kansas-Nebraska Act in 1854. Under Schneider's management the paper took strong ground on this issue. With the exception of the Western Citizen, an avowed anti-slavery weekly journal, the Staats-Zeitung was the first paper in Chicago to array itself in absolute opposition to the Kansas-Nebraska Act.

In the latter part of January 1854, while the act was still pending in Congress, Schneider called the first popular meeting held in Chicago to express popular opposition to opening the door for the extension of slavery into territory that had been dedicated to freedom. While the paper and its managers were threatened with mob violence, the preparation made by Schneider and his assistants had the effect of restraining the spirit of mobocracy and protecting the city from the disgrace of lawless violence. The attitude then taken by a large majority of the German population of the region in opposition to the Kansas-Nebraska Act, and their subsequent attitude in loyal support of the Union during the Civil War, was due to a larger extent to the influence and teaching of the Staats-Zeitung.

=== Republican politics ===
It was during this period that the first steps were taken in the organization of the Republican Party in Illinois, and in this movement Schneider became an active and influential figure. At the meeting of the Anti-Nebraska editors, held at Decatur on February 22, 1856, which resulted in crystallizing the elements which had been in course of evolution during the preceding two years, he was present and, as a member of the Committee on Resolutions, bore a conspicuous part in giving shape to the principles of the new party which, in its first regular State Convention held in Bloomington, three months later nominated the ticket headed by William H. Bissell for Governor, which was elected in November following.

It was chiefly through Schneider's influence, backed by the approval of Abraham Lincoln, that a resolution was adopted at the Decatur conference favoring tolerance of religious faith and freedom of conscience, as opposed to the principles of the Know Nothing Party. These sentiments were echoed in the platform adopted at Bloomington in May, and still later reiterated by the first Republican National Convention held in Philadelphia on June 17, in both of which Schneider was a delegate.

He was a delegate to the Republican national convention of 1860 as well. He took a prominent part in calling the first public meeting held in Chicago in 1861 to sustain the Government in its opposition to the rebellion, then in its incipient stage. His service was recognized by Lincoln in his appointment as consul general at Elsinore, Denmark, where he rendered the country valuable service by imparting to the Danish people an accurate knowledge of the real issue between the federal government and the Confederacy. Returning from Denmark a year later, he sold his half interest in the Staats-Zeitung and accepted an appointment as Collector of Internal Revenue for the Chicago district, which he held for four years.

He then became president of the State Savings Institution until 1871, when he became president of the National Bank of Illinois. In 1877, President Hayes nominated him for United States minister to Switzerland, but he declined for personal and business reasons. He was a presidential elector on the Garfield ticket in 1880.

=== Philanthropic efforts ===
He was treasurer of the Chicago South Park Board (1878), director of the Chicago Festival Association (1885) where he played a key role in recruiting talented musicians for Chicago, and director of the Illinois Humane Society (many years).

=== Bank collapse ===
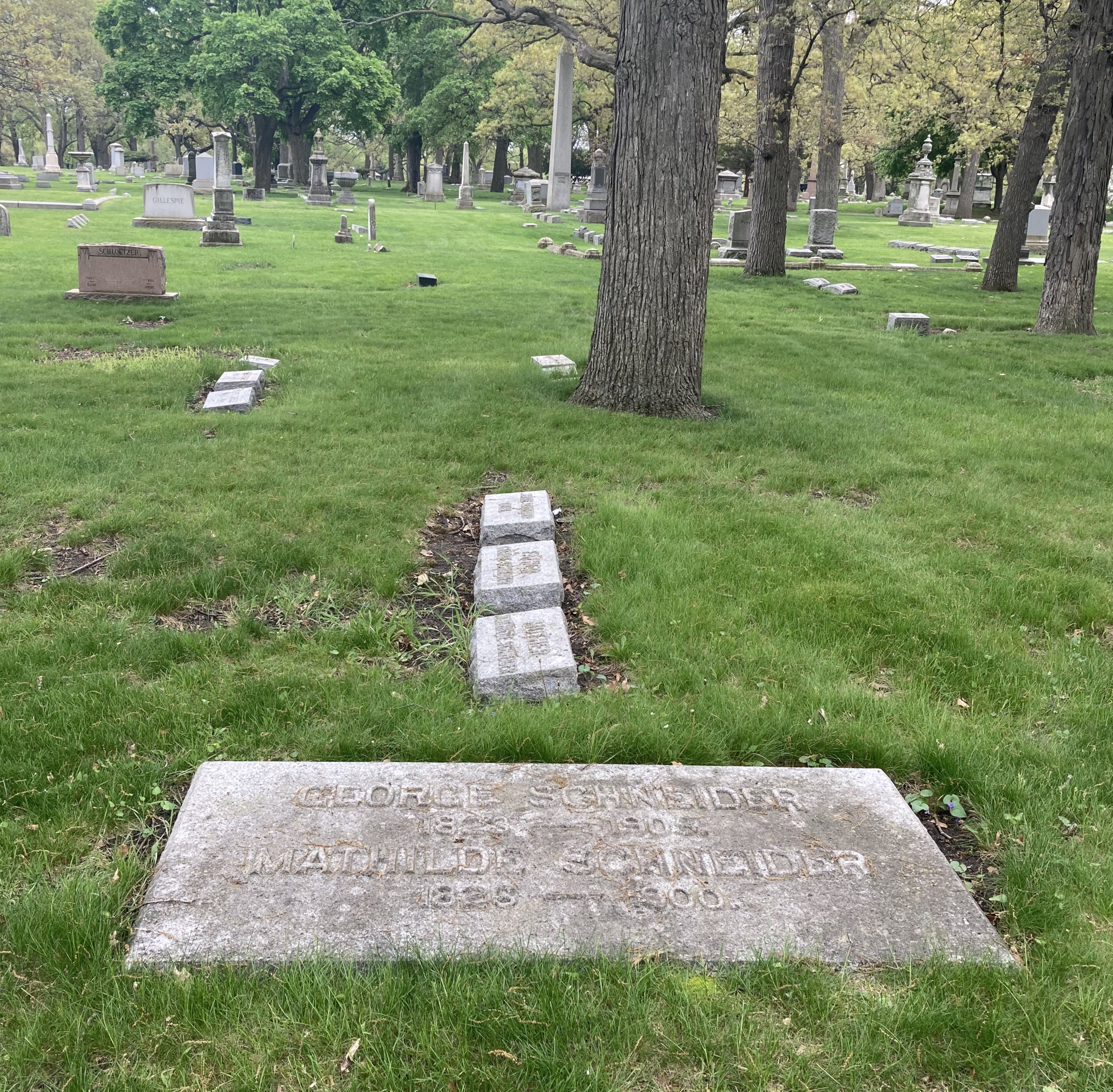
Schneider's grave at Rosehill Cemetery

In 1896, the Illinois National Bank was overtaken by disaster, largely through the mismanagement of others. In the last days of December 1896 it was forced to go into liquidation. This resulted in heavy pecuniary loss to Schneider, and wiped out of existence an institution which he had spent more than a quarter of a century in building up. Saddened by this event, the later years of his life were spent in practical retirement, much of it with one of his daughters in Kansas City.

Schneider died on September 16, 1905, while seeking recuperation of his health at Colorado Springs, Colorado. He was interred at Rosehill Cemetery, Chicago, a large number of his countrymen taking part in the honors paid to his memory.

== Notes ==
Preceded by office created	Collector of Internal Revenue for the 1st District of Illinois; 1862–1866	Succeeded by Orrin L. Mann

Preceded by Hermann Kriege	Editor in Chief of the Illinois Staats-Zeitung; 1851–1861	Succeeded by Lorenzo Brentano
