= Hermann Raster =

American journalist

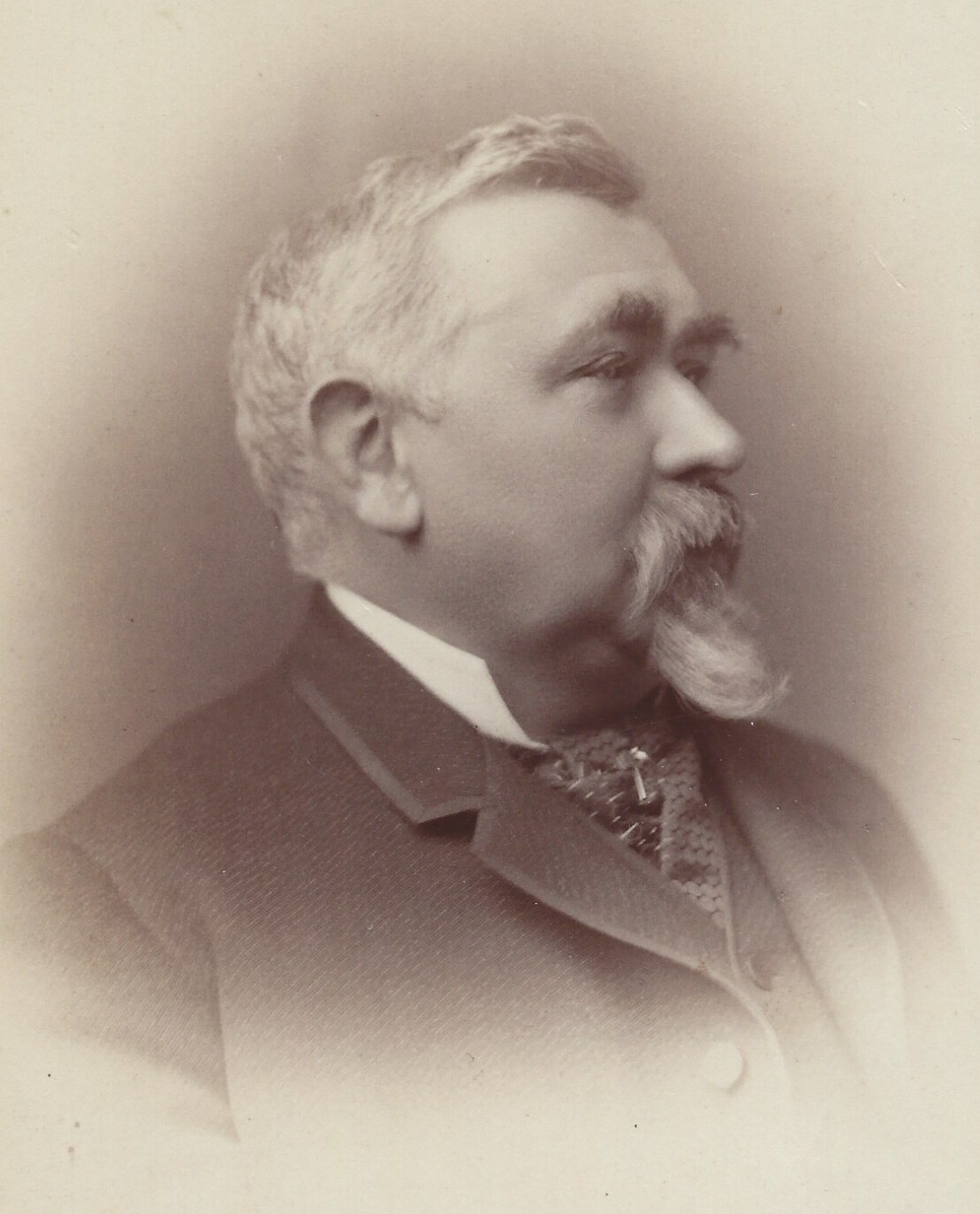

Collector of Internal Revenue for the First District of Illinois
- In office December 1869 – March 30, 1872
- Appointed by: Ulysses S. Grant
- Preceded by: Edmund Jüssen
- Succeeded by: Samuel A. Irvin

Secretary of the State Assembly of Dessau
- In office 1848–1851

Personal details
- Born: Wilhelm Friedrich Hermann Raster; May 6, 1827 Zerbst, Duchy of Anhalt-Dessau
- Died: July 24, 1891 (aged 64) Bad Kudowa, Province of Silesia, German Empire
- Resting place: Graceland Cemetery
- Party: Free Soil (1851-1854), Republican (1854-1891)
- Spouse(s): Emilia Hahn; Margarethe Oppenheim
- Children: 4
- Education: University of Leipzig, University of Berlin
- Profession: Editor, journalist, politician

Hermann Raster (May 6, 1827 – July 24, 1891) was an American editor, abolitionist, writer, and anti-temperance political boss who served as chief editor and part-owner of the Illinois Staats-Zeitung, a widely circulated newspaper in the German language in the United States, between 1867 and 1891. Together with publisher A.C. Hesing, Raster exerted considerable control over the German vote in the Midwest and forced the Republican Party to formally adopt an anti-prohibition platform in 1872, known as the Raster Resolution. He was appointed as Collector of Internal Revenue for the First District of Illinois by President Ulysses S. Grant but resigned from this post shortly thereafter. Raster returned to Europe in 1890 when his health began to fail him and died filling a minor diplomatic role in Berlin. Today he is best remembered for his extensive correspondence with Western intellectual and political figures of the time, such as Joseph Pulitzer, Elihu Washburne, and Francis Wayland Parker, much of which is preserved at the Newberry Library in Chicago.

== Biography ==
=== Early life and the Revolutions of 1848 ===
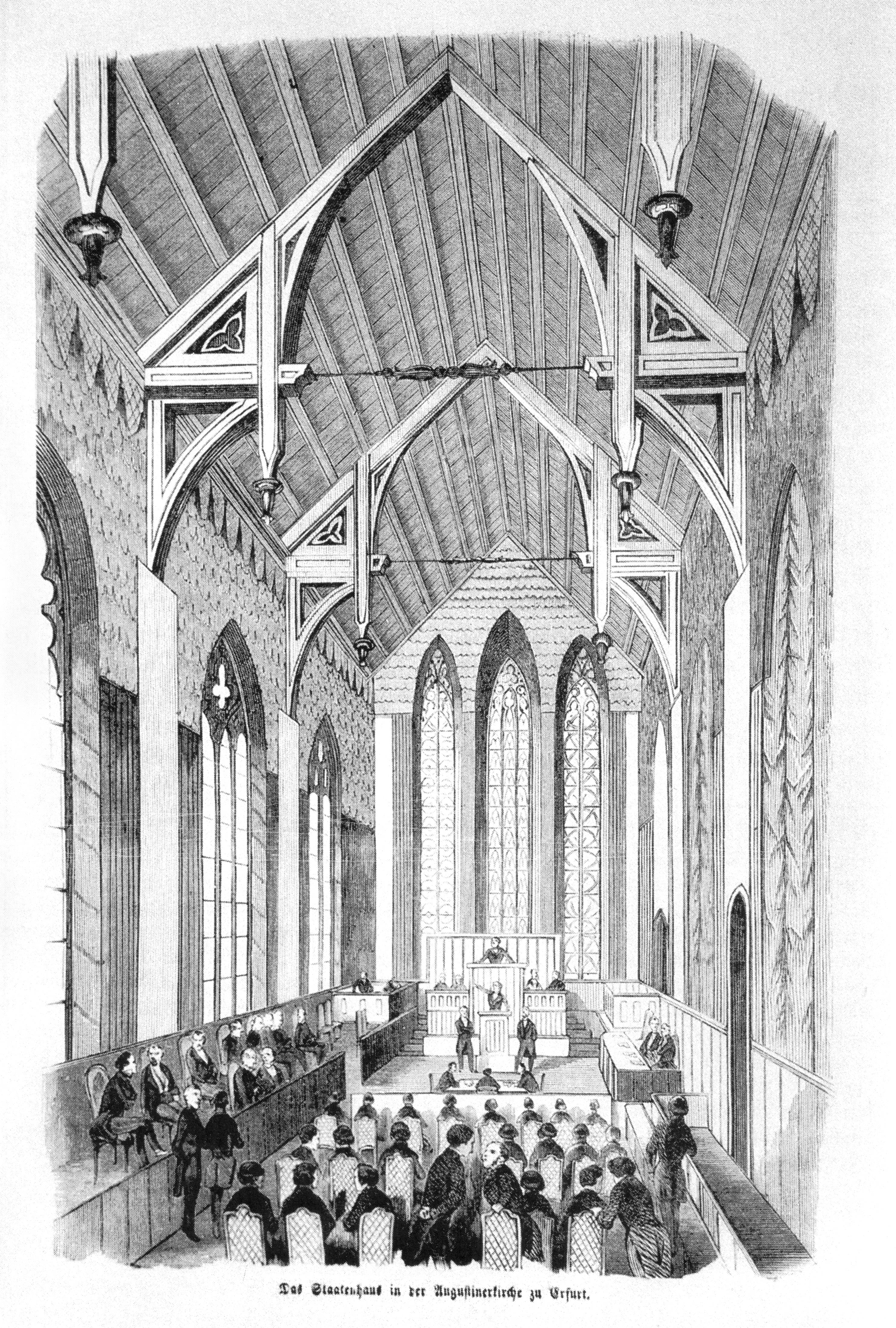
The revolutionary Erfurt Union Parliament, of which Raster was Chief Stenographer during its brief existence

Raster was born in Zerbst, in the Duchy of Anhalt-Dessau on May 6, 1827, to a family from the German nobility. He was the son of statesman Wilhelm Christian Raster, a friend of Leopold IV, Duke of Anhalt who served as the chief Collector of Customs and Excise for the Duchy and was a noted translator from the English language. His father insisted he learn English from a young age and had a tutor brought from England to instruct him. A naturally talented linguist, Raster was fluent in seven languages by the time he completed his education. He graduated from the University of Leipzig in 1846 and then the University of Berlin in 1848, studying philology, linguistics, and history at his father's behest. Despite his father's wishes for him to pursue a career in philology, Hermann Raster was more interested in journalism and politics than in academia. In 1849 he took a position as the stenographer of the Anhalt Legislature and shortly thereafter was named Secretary of the State Assembly of Dessau. Spurred by an encounter with the writer Bettina von Arnim, Raster became an important leader of the 1848 Revolution in Dessau, and passionately wrote pamphlets criticizing both the Caesaropapism of the Lutheran Church and the autocracy of the state. Despite his youth, he was made Chief Stenographer of the both short-lived and revolutionary Erfurt Parliament in March 1850. In 1851, during the aftermath of the failed revolutions, Raster was given the choice to emigrate permanently from the German States like other Forty-Eighters or to face criminal prosecution for his actions.

=== New York ===
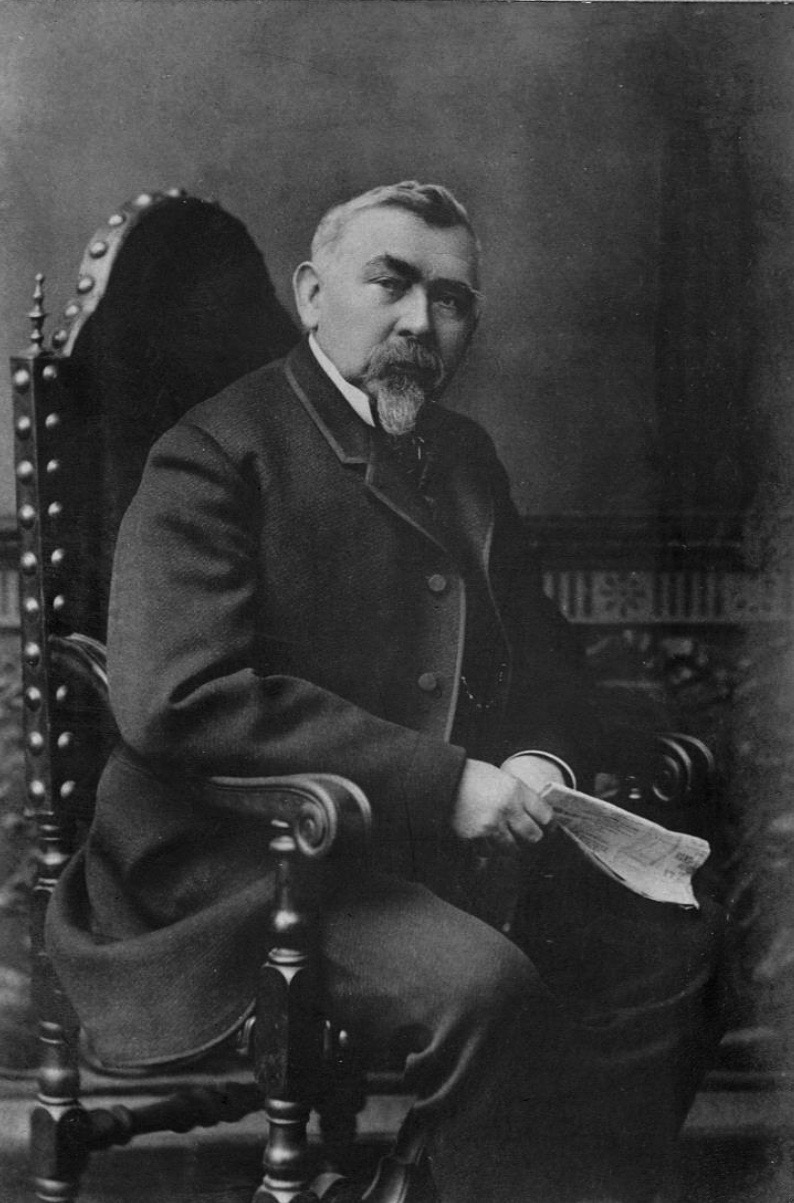
Raster in 1882

Raster arrived in New York City in July, 1851 and first found employment as a wood-chopper at a farm near Tioga, Pennsylvania. He left for Buffalo in the spring of 1852, accepting the position of editor for the Buffalo Demokrat. His journalistic reputation grew quickly and in February 1853, Raster was made editor of the New-Yorker Abend-Zeitung, one of the most influential German-language papers of the time. He had a wife, Emilia Berta Hahn Raster, born in 1836, and a daughter, Mathilde, with her in 1855. While living in New York, he became an active member of the Republican Party. In 1856, he became an elector in the 1856 presidential election. Raster was influential in leading the German-American switch to the Republican Party in 1856, swaying German public opinion via his pro-union, anti-slavery articles in the German press, and promoting the personal liberty cause. He was a very strong supporter of Abraham Lincoln and helped convince the German and European communities to vote Republican. His wife, Emilia, died on October 14, 1861, at the age of 25, of an unknown cause. She is interred at Evergreens Cemetery in New York. During the American Civil War, he was the primary American correspondent for the newspapers in Berlin, Bremen, Vienna, and other Central European cities, and was regarded as more effective in campaigning for the American cause in Germany than any politicians at the time. He returned to Germany briefly during the war to drum up support for the Union and find investors for Union bonds. Up until 1867 he was also the Wagonmaster of the United States Custom House in New York City.

=== Chicago and later life ===
In 1867, Raster accepted A.C. Hesing's offer for the position as editor for the Illinois Staats-Zeitung in Chicago, a position he kept until his death. Raster was a delegate to the 1868 Republican National Convention, where he was chairman of the platform committee. In 1869, he was appointed the Collector of Internal Revenue for the District of Chicago. During the Great Chicago Fire of 1871, Raster lost his home, and the newspaper building and all of its archives and contents were destroyed. Regardless of the extreme loss, the Staats-Zeitung (under Raster's administration) was the first newspaper in Chicago to print the news of the fire, having gathered enough supplies to resume printing less than 48 hours after the catastrophe. In Later the same year, he was re-appointed the position as Collector of Internal Revenue by President Ulysses S. Grant. In 1872, Raster resigned from the position as Collector of Internal Revenue to save more time for the paper and help campaign for Grant in the upcoming election. That same year at the National Republican Convention in Philadelphia inserted the "Raster Resolution" in its platform which greatly opposed the Temperance movement. Raster held so much influence over the German community he once threatened to leave the party if Prohibition was not made an issue and the resolution not passed and with him the entire German vote, which was a substantial base of power for the Republican Party in the West. During the Haymarket Affair, Raster was trying to delegate the rioters before he left the scene when he realized any hope for containing the situation was lost. Once the perpetrators were caught he wrote a letter to the Governor, John Peter Altgeld demanding that the prisoners be put to death.

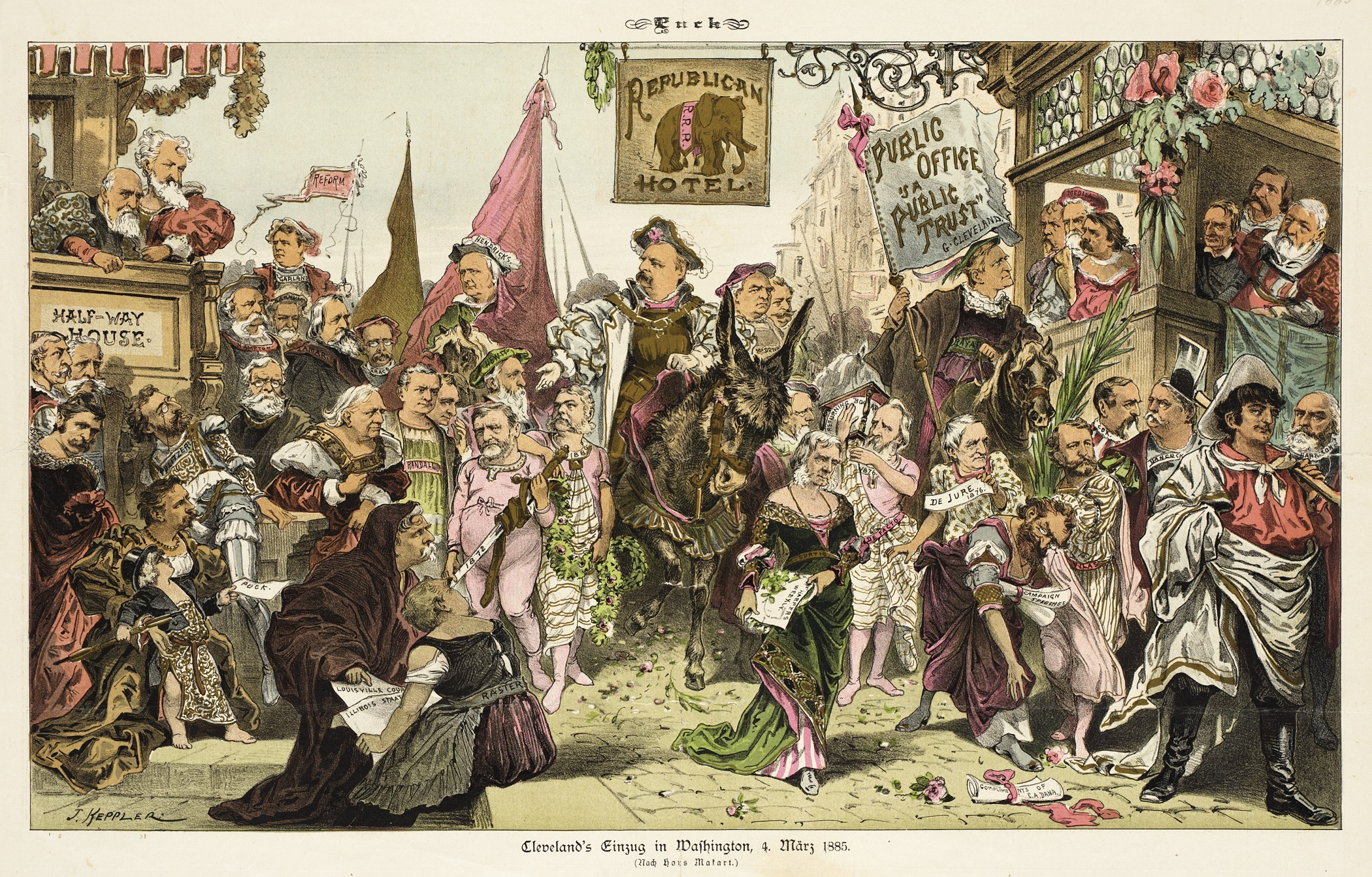
A cartoon in Puck caricaturing Grover Cleveland's entry into Washington following his 1885 inauguration in which Raster is featured in the foreground clutching a copy of the Staats-Zeitung alongside other Republican leaders

He blamed the recent German "immigrant radicals" for the issues at hand and suggested immigration reforms be made, stating, "Unfortunately it is from the German Reich that these bloody scoundrels, these socialists, communists, and anarchists have come." Despite his own history as a revolutionary, Raster drafted an "Anarchist Expulsion Bill" in 1887 for Congressional Debate.

Raster was an active member of the Chicago Intelligentsia of the late 19th century, and was on the first 9-member board of the Chicago Public Library in the 1870s. He was also on the Chicago Board of Education for many years, and was on the board of trustees for the Field Museum of Natural History.

=== Death and legacy ===
Raster died on July 24, 1891, in Kudowa-Zdrój, Silesia, where he had traveled in June 1890 because of his poor health.

His body was brought back to the United States on board the SS Eider of the Norddeutscher Lloyd. On August 12, his funeral services were conducted at the German Press Club in Chicago, and speakers from as far away as New York and New Jersey attended. The hall was decorated with hanging crepes and his casket, made of walnut and "heavily" mounted with silver, was "literally covered in floral emblems sent by various German-American press organizations." The German American Press Club of Philadelphia sent a large anchor, and the German Club of Hoboken, New Jersey, gave a laurel wreath wrapped in the colors of the 1848 revolution, which Raster was a part of, that said, "To the German Hero from the German Club." His wife Margarethe refused to leave his casket and "sobbed violently" until the group convinced her to go to her carriage. Honorary pallbearers at his funeral included Mayor Hempstead Washburne and Senator Charles B. Farwell.

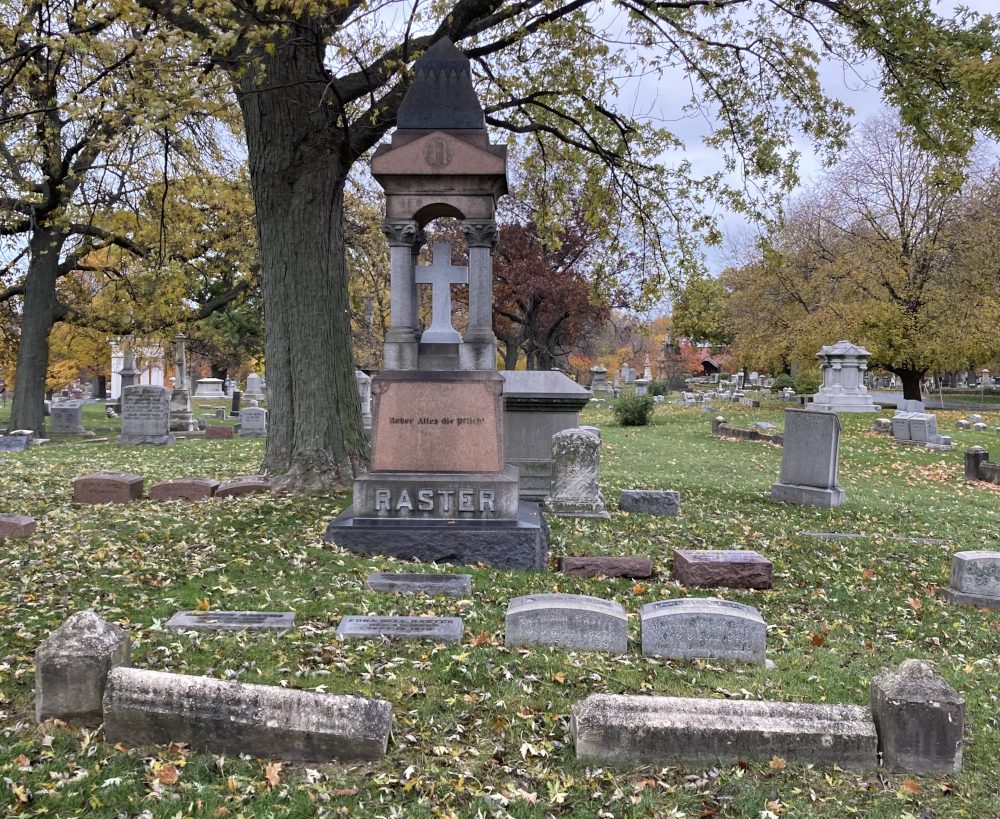
Raster's grave at Graceland Cemetery

On his death, the Chicago Tribune produced an article which said, "His writings during and after the Civil War did more to create understanding and appreciation of the American situation in Germany and to float U.S. bonds in Europe than the combined efforts of all the U.S. ministers and consuls." Raster was interred at Graceland Cemetery on August 13, 1891, where his grave remains today.

In 1891, Raster's family and friends posthumously published a novel filled with his travel papers, essays, and biography, titled "Reisebriefe von Hermann Raster: mit einer Biographie und einem Bildniss des Verfassers". The novel was accredited to Raster, though the introduction and biographer remain unknown. The essays chronicle the life travels and experiences of Raster.

Over 3,900 of his papers, correspondence, notes, and manuscripts were donated to the Newberry Library in 1893. In 1893 the Hermann Raster School was opened on 6937 Wood St in Chicago and had 200 students. In 1910, the larger Hermann Raster Elementary School was built at 6936 Hermitage Ave, but the school has since changed names and hands, and is now the campus of The Montessori School of Englewood.

Raster's son-in-law was Chicago architect Arthur Hercz and his granddaughter Corrine married Chicago-based industrialist and horticulturist Bruce Krasberg.

== Selected bibliography ==
- Die drei Betrüger : Nach der im Jahr 1598 erschienen Schrift: De Tribvs Impostoribvs, 1846
- Thatsachen aus der politischen Geschichte der Vereinigten Staaten, 1860
- Einheit und Freiheit, 1863
- General Butler in New Orleans, 1864

Preceded by Edmund Jüssen	Collector of Internal Revenue for the 1st District of Illinois; December 1869 - March 30, 1872	Succeeded by Samuel A. Irvin

Preceded by Lorenzo Brentano	Editor in Chief of the Illinois Staats-Zeitung; 1867-1891	Succeeded by Wilhelm Rapp
