= May Cuyler =

American socialite

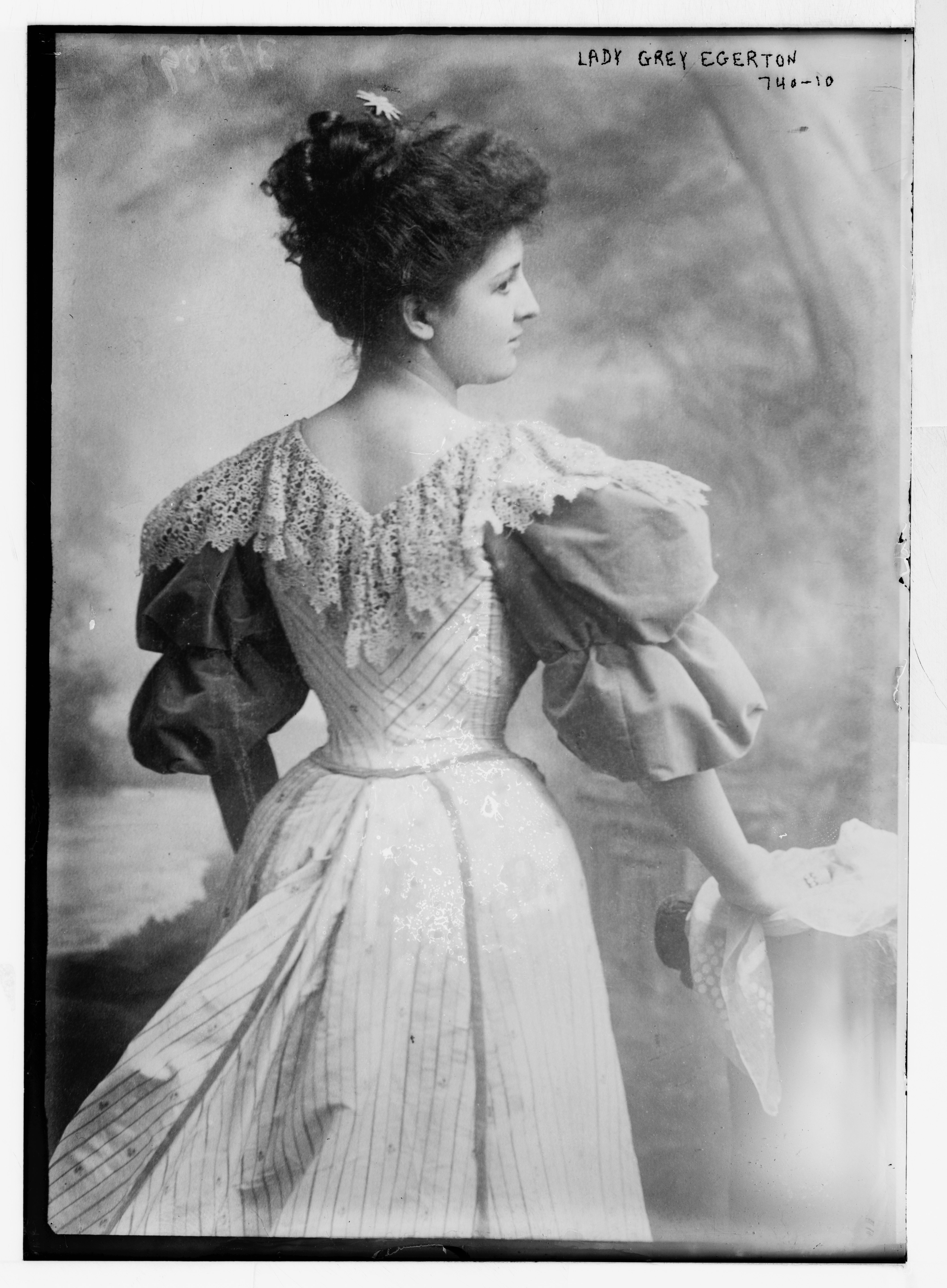
Photograph of Lady Grey Egerton, Library of Congress

Mary Carolyn Campbell McCreery (née Cuyler, formerly Lady Grey-Egerton) (23 December 1871 – 25 November 1958) was an American socialite.

== Early life ==
May was born on 23 December 1871 in Milwaukee, Wisconsin. She was a daughter of Alice (née Holden) Cuyler and Maj. James Wayne Cuyler (1841–1883) of Baltimore, Maryland. Her father, a West Point graduate and engineer, fought for the Union Army in the U.S. Civil War.

Her paternal grandparents were physician and Bvt. Brig.-Gen. John Meck Cuyler (son of Judge Jeremiah La Touche Cuyler) and Mary Campbell (née Wayne) Cuyler (a daughter of Associate Justice of the Supreme Court of the United States James Moore Wayne). (Note: May's great-uncle (her grandmother's brother), Henry Constantine Wayne, married Mary Louisa Nicoll, sister to Elizabeth Smith (née Nicoll) Hamilton (the wife of Gen. Alexander Hamilton, oldest grandson of Alexander Hamilton).) A first cousin of her grandfather was U.S. Representative Rudolph Bunner. Her maternal grandparents were Wisconsin State Assemblyman and avid abolitionist Edward Dwight Holton and Lucinda Caroline (née Millard) Holton (a second cousin of Millard Fillmore). Her aunt, Mary Holton, married Robertson James, the youngest brother of novelist Henry James.

== Personal life ==
On 4 January 1893, May was married to Sir Philip Grey Egerton, 12th Baronet in London. Sir Philip was the only son of Sir Philip Grey-Egerton, 11th Baronet and Hon. Henrietta Denison (eldest daughter of Albert Denison, 1st Baron Londesborough). Their engagement had been announced in The New York Times on 29 October 1892, and the "wedding received extensive press coverage, featuring lists of the jewels received as gifts, including a diamond tiara." After their marriage, "she became as great a belle in London society as she had been" in the United States. Before their divorce in May 1905, they were the parents of twin sons and a daughter:

- Philip de Malpas Wayne Grey-Egerton (1895–1918), a Captain in the 19th Royal Hussars who was killed in action at Brancoucourt Farm.
- Rowland le Belward Grey-Egerton (1895–1914), a Second Lieutenant in the Royal Welsh Fusiliers who was also killed in action.
- Cecily Alice Grey Grey-Egerton MBE (d. 1981), who married Lt. Col. Denys Edward Prideaux-Brune DSO (d. 1952), second son of Hon. Katharine Hugessen (daughter of Edward Knatchbull-Hugessen, 1st Baron Brabourne) and Col. Charles Robert Prideaux-Brune of Prideaux Place, in 1918.

After their divorce, (Note: In April 1910, Sir Philip remarried to Aimée Mary (née Cumming) Clarke, the former wife of Sir Rupert Clarke, 2nd Baronet.) May married Richard Stephen McCreery (1866–1938) on 2 March 1907 at May's residence on Hallam Street in London. McCreery, who was divorced from Edith Kip, was a son of Andrew Buchanan McCreery and Isabel (née Swearingen) McCreery. (Note: McCreery's first wife, Edith Kip, was a daughter of Lawrence Kip and Eva Lorillard Kip (the daughter of Lorillard Tobacco Company heir Pierre Lorillard III). Eva and Richard had married in April 1894 and divorced in 1904. After their divorce, Eva married the Hon. Henry Thomas Coventry (son of George Coventry, 9th Earl of Coventry), in December 1907. From his first marriage, McCreery had two sons: Lawrence B. McCreery and Lorillard Kip McCreery (d. 1926).) His maternal aunt, Mary Swearingen, was the wife of Supreme Court Justice Stephen Johnson Field, and his nephew was Gen. Sir Richard McCreery, Commander of the British Eighth Army. (Note: Gen. Sir Richard McCreery was a son of McCreery's younger brother, Walter Adolph McCreery and Emilia (née McAdam) McCreery, a great-great granddaughter of Scottish engineer John Loudon McAdam.) With her second husband, she was the mother of:

- Isobel McCreery, who married Augustus Taylor, Jr. in 1937.

Her first husband, Sir Philip, died on 4 July 1937, and her second husband died in 1938. As both of their sons predeceased their father, the baronetcy passed to the Rev. Sir Brooke de Malpas Egerton, Sir Philip's first cousin once removed. May died at her home, 2202 Forest Drive in Burlingame, California on 25 November 1958.

=== Descendants ===
Through her daughter Cecily, she was a grandmother to three: Cynthia Mary Denise Prideaux-Brune (b. 1919), Philip Egerton Edmund Prideaux-Brune (b. 1921), and Rowland Denys Charles Prideaux-Brune (1925–2008).

== In popular culture ==
During the 2014-2015 exhibition at London's National Portrait Gallery, she was featured among the high-profile American heiresses to marry into British aristocracy. Also included in the exhibition were Margaret Leiter (married to the 19th Earl of Suffolk), Jennie Jerome (married to Lord Randolph Churchill), Mary Leiter (married to the 1st Marquess Curzon of Kedleston), Consuelo Yznaga (married to the 8th Duke of Manchester), Consuelo Vanderbilt (married to the 9th Duke of Marlborough and to Jacques Balsan), Laura Charteris (married to the 10th Duke of Marlborough) and Cornelia Martin (married to the 4th Earl of Craven).
