= James Wayne =

James Wayne may refer to:

- James M. Wayne (1790–1867), U.S. Supreme Court justice and U.S. representative
  - SS James M. Wayne, a Liberty ship
- James Wayne (R&B musician) (1920–1978), American rhythm and blues musician who also recorded as James Waynes and "Wild Willie" Wayne
- Jimmy Wayne (born 1972), American country musician
  - Jimmy Wayne (album)
- Jim Wayne, member of the Kentucky House of Representatives
