= Margaret Howard, Countess of Suffolk =

American heiress (1879–1968)

The Right Honourable The Countess of Suffolk
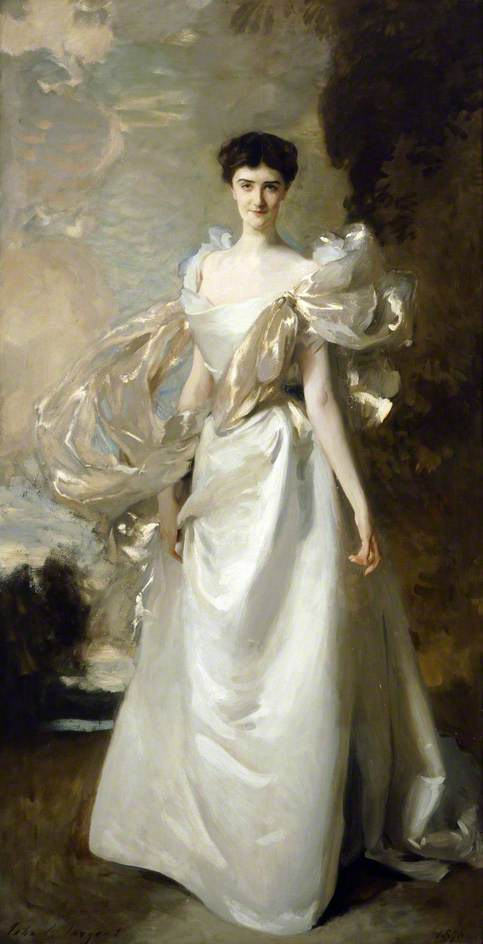
- Portrait of Daisy Leiter, by John Singer Sargent, 1898
- Born: Margaret Hyde Leiter; 1 September 1879; Chicago, Illinois, U.S.
- Died: 5 April 1968 (aged 88); Lancaster, California, U.S.
- Spouse: Henry Howard, 19th Earl of Suffolk (m. 1904; died 1917)
- Children: Charles Howard, 20th Earl of Suffolk; Cecil John Arthur Howard; Greville Reginald Howard
- Parent(s): Mary Theresa Carver; Levi Ziegler Leiter
- Relatives: Mary Curzon, Baroness Curzon (sister)

Margaret "Daisy" Howard, Countess of Suffolk (born Margaret Hyde Leiter; 1 September 1879 – 5 March 1968) was an American-born heiress who married into the British aristocracy and was known as one of the "Million Dollar Princesses".

== Early life ==
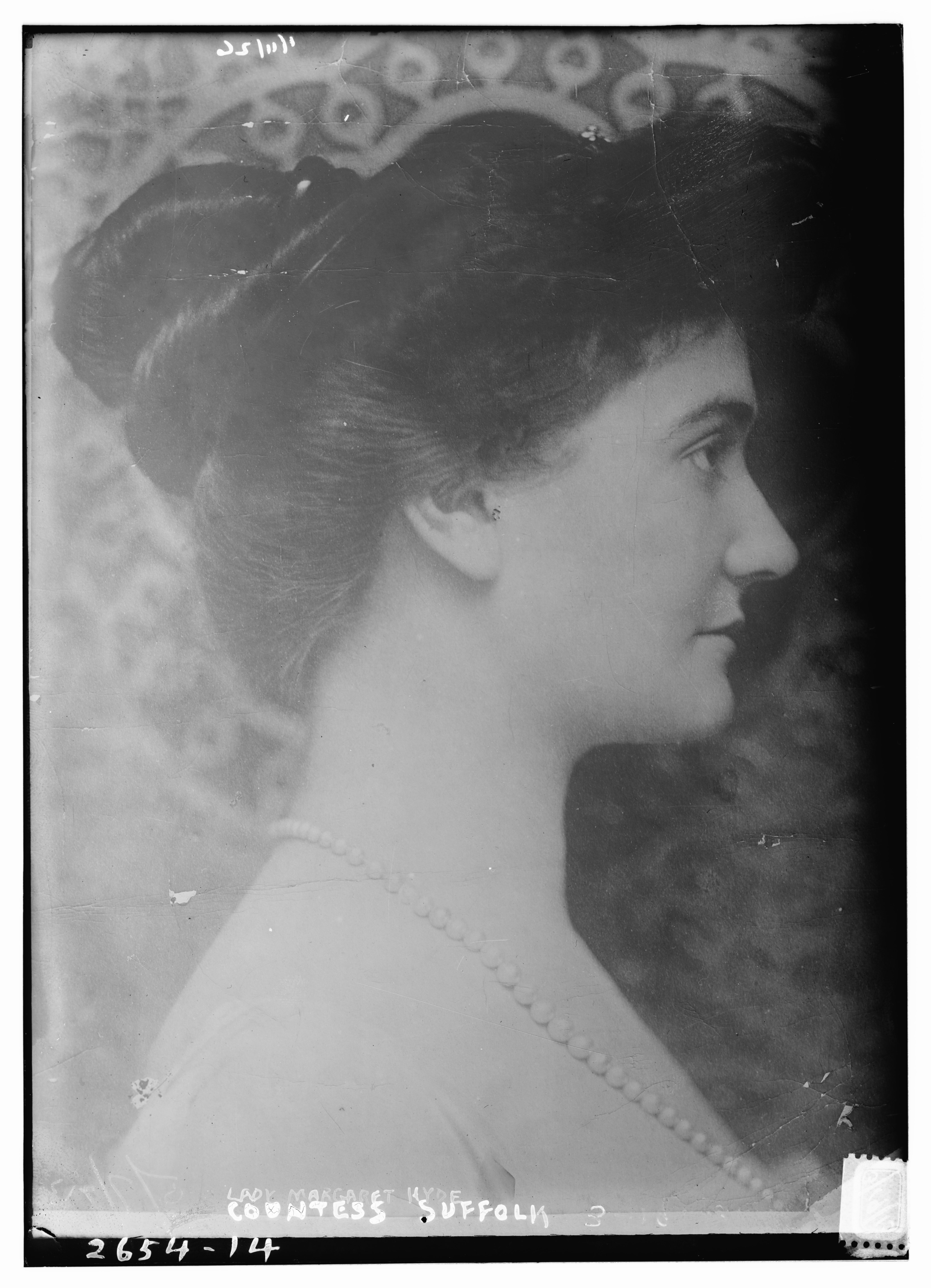
The Countess of Suffolk, 1910.

Margaret Hyde "Daisy" Leiter was born in Chicago on 1 September 1879. She was the third daughter and youngest of four children born to Mary Theresa (née Carver) and Levi Ziegler Leiter, the co-founder of Field and Leiter dry goods business, and later partner in the Marshall Fields retail empire. Her three older siblings were Joseph Leiter, a Harvard graduate, Mary Leiter, who married the British Conservative statesman George Curzon, later 1st Marquess Curzon of Kedleston, and Nancy Lathrop Carver Leiter, the sponsor of USS Illinois who married Colin Powys Campbell. On her father's side, she was of Swiss-German descent.

In 1881, her family moved to Washington, D.C. and entered society there, while summering in Bar Harbor, Maine. While in Washington, they lived in the former home of James G. Blaine on Dupont Circle for several years before moving into the palatial Leiter House. Daisy and her two sisters attended finishing school in England.

In 1898, Daisy was painted by the prominent American portrait artist John Singer Sargent. In 1994, the Hon. Mary Howard bequeathed the painting to English Heritage, Kenwood. Also that year, it was announced that she was chosen by Governor John Riley Tanner to christen the battleship USS Illinois. The report was incorrect and her older sister Nancy, was in fact, the honored.

== Personal life ==
In 1903, while visiting her sister Mary in India for the Delhi Durbar celebrations, Daisy met the aide-de-camp of her brother-in-law, George, who was Viceroy of India. He was Henry Molyneux Paget Howard, 19th Earl of Suffolk, 12th Earl of Berkshire, who was known to be short of money. In July 1904, she was reportedly engaged to Major Crawley, but the engagement was called off. They eventually became engaged and when The New York Times reported the engagement in December 1904, they noted that the Earl's "estate Charlton Park... in Wiltshire will be restored to the glory of its former days." Daisy and Lord Suffolk eventually wed on 26 December 1904, several months after the death of her father, at the Leiter family residence in Washington, D.C., with Daisy wearing "a coronet of diamonds, part of the family jewels of the house of Suffolk and Berkshire, which was sent from England for the event." Henry was the eldest son of Henry Howard, 18th Earl of Suffolk. Together, they were the parents of:

- The Hon. Charles Henry George Howard (1906–1941), who married American-born ballet dancer, Mimi Forde-Piggott, known as "Mimi Crawford", daughter of Alfred George Forde-Piggott and niece of Robert Chalmers, 1st Baron Chalmers, the former Governor-General of Ceylon.
- The Hon. Cecil John Arthur Howard (1908–1985), who married Frances Drake Dean, daughter of Edwin Morgan Dean, without issue.
- Lt.-Cdr. Hon. Greville Reginald Howard (1909–1987), who married Mary Ridehalgh, daughter of William Smith Ridehalgh of Broughton Lodge.

While she was in India with her sister, her husband died after shrapnel pierced his heart at the Battle of Istabulat on 21 April 1917 while commanding his battery. He was buried at Basra War Cemetery in Iraq. Her eldest son, who became the 20th Earl of Suffolk, was killed in 1941 by a bomb he was attempting to defuse and was succeeded by his six-year-old son, Michael Howard, 21st Earl of Suffolk.

=== Later life ===
In 1922, while riding in Charlton Park, she fell from her horse and broke her leg. Two years later in 1924, she again fell from her horse and broke several ribs.

Upon her father's death in 1904, he bequeathed her millions of dollars in his will, which stipulated that she had to live four months of every year in the United States. In 1930, she agreed to sell the Pelican Portrait of Queen Elizabeth I, which was at Charlton House, to Spink & Son for a rich collector. In 1934, she bought property on Magee Road at the foothills of the Santa Catalina Mountains in Oro Valley, Arizona from Matthew Baird III. In 1935, she hired architect Robert A. Morse to design her a house "that hinted at art deco" and featured five master bedrooms, air-conditioning, and "a bomb shelter that ran under the perimeter of the house." She called it "Forest Lodge" and owned the property until 1957 when she felt the nearby city of Tucson was encroaching on her property and sold it to the Sisters of the Immaculate Heart of Mary (which became the Immaculate Heart High School). She then purchased a 3,500 acre ranch in Oracle, Arizona, which today is part of Biosphere 2.

In her later years, she became a helicopter pilot and was known to fly from her Cornish home to her suite at The Ritz Hotel via the Battersea Heliport. While flying to California to visit her son Cecil, the Dowager Countess of Suffolk and Berkshire had a heart attack and later died at Antelope Valley Hospital in Lancaster, California on 5 March 1968.

== In popular culture ==
During the 2014-2015 exhibition at London's National Portrait Gallery, she was featured among the high-profile American heiresses to marry into British aristocracy. Also included in the exhibition were Jennie Jerome (married to Lord Randolph Churchill), Mary Leiter (married to the 1st Marquess Curzon of Kedleston), May Cuyler (married to Sir Philip Grey Egerton, 12th Bt), Consuelo Yznaga (married to the 8th Duke of Manchester), Consuelo Vanderbilt (married to the 9th Duke of Marlborough and to Jacques Balsan), Laura Charteris (married to the 10th Duke of Marlborough) and Cornelia Martin (married to the 4th Earl of Craven).
