= Jussen =

Jussen or Jüssen is a surname. Notable people with the surname include:

- Edmund Jüssen (1830–1891), German-American politician and diplomat
- Lucas & Arthur Jussen (born 1993 and 1996), Dutch piano duo
