= John Adair McDowell (colonel) =

American Army officer

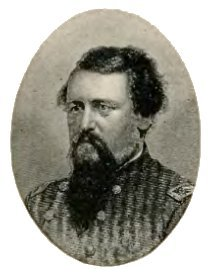
- Colonel John A. McDowell
- Born: July 22, 1825; Columbus, Ohio, US
- Died: July 4, 1887 (aged 61); Madison County, Alabama, US
- Military career
- Allegiance: United States
- Branch: United States Army; Union Army
- Service years: 1861–1863
- Rank: Colonel
- Unit: 6th Iowa Infantry
- Conflicts: American Civil War: Battle of Shiloh; Siege of Corinth

John Adair McDowell (July 22, 1825 – July 4, 1887) was an American military officer and engineer who served as the first colonel of the 6th Iowa Volunteer Infantry Regiment during the American Civil War. He was a younger brother of Irvin McDowell, the general best remembered for the First Battle of Bull Run, the first large Civil War battle. He was also the son of Abram Irvin McDowell, a former mayor of Columbus, Ohio.

McDowell had served in a militia company before the war. He was given the rank of colonel on June 20, 1861. He led a brigade on the right side of Brigadier General William Tecumseh Sherman's division of Major General Grant's Army of the Tennessee at the Battle of Shiloh. His command consisted of his own 6th Iowa, the 40th Illinois, the 46th Ohio, and the 6th Indiana battery. Sherman considered McDowell a fit brigade commander and described him as a "good, kind-hearted gentleman." McDowell's brother Malcolm was a paymaster under Sherman's command and was a signal officer for his other brother Irwin.

McDowell resigned his commission on March 12, 1863. John M. Corse succeeded him as commander of the 6th Iowa. McDowell was a resident of Keokuk, Iowa, although he had been born in Ohio.

== See also ==
- Irvin McDowell
- Battle of Shiloh
