= List of reporting marks: Z =

Note: Marks ending in U are for container owners; marks ending in X are not common carriers; marks ending in Z are for trailers without flanged wheels. All other marks are of common-carrier railroads.

== Z ==
- ZBTX - Zalev Brothers Scrap Yard, Windsor, Ontario, Canada
- ZBXU - Zim Israel Navigation Company Limited
- ZCAX - Zinc Corporation of America
- ZCCX - Zeigler Coal Company
- ZCSU - Zim American Israeli Shipping Company Incorporated
- ZDAZ - XTRA Intermodal
- ZIMU - Zim Israel Navigation Company Limited
- ZIPX - Zip Transportation Company
- ZKCC - XTRA Intermodal
- ZMFC - XTRA Intermodal
- ZRNX - Zurn Industries (Erie City Energy Division)
- ZTLX - Ziol Tank Line
- ZTTX - Trailer Train Company
- ZVBX - Ferrous Processing and Trading Company
