= John V. Farwell =

American merchant and philanthropist (1825–1908)

John Villiers Farwell Sr.
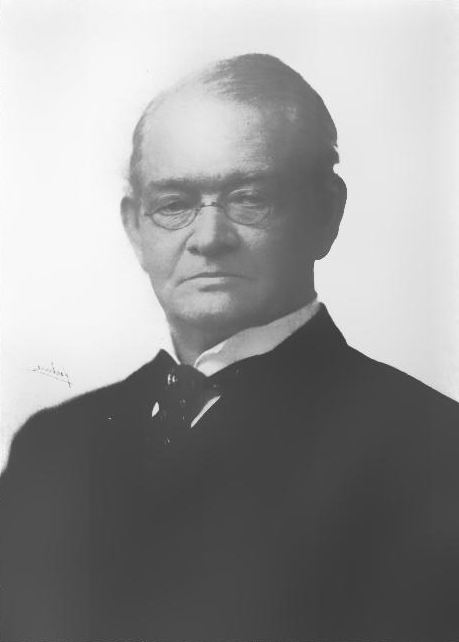
- Born: July 25, 1825; Mead's Creek, New York, US
- Died: August 20, 1908 (aged 83); Lake Forest, Illinois, US
- Burial place: Lake Forest Cemetery
- Occupations: Senior partner of John V. Farwell & Co., joint partner - Farwell, Field & Co., (1862–1865)
- Spouse(s): Abigail G. Taylor, Emeret C. Cooley
- Parent(s): Henry Farwell and Nancy Jackson

John Villiers Farwell Sr. (July 29, 1825 – August 20, 1908) was an American merchant and philanthropist from New York City. Moving to Chicago, Illinois, at a young age, he joined Wadsworth & Phelps, eventually rising to be senior partner at John V. Farwell & Co. He was also a mentor and brief joint partner with Marshall Field, (1834–1906), in the firm Farwell, Field & Co. from 1862 to 1865, before Field moved on with other partners to eventually establish his own famous prototype of the modern department store at Marshall Field and Company. Farwell was a leader in several Christian philanthropic efforts including the YMCA, the United States Christian Commission during the American Civil War, and was a believer and supporter of the evangelical works of Dwight L. Moody. Later, he served as an Indian agent and had large land holdings in Texas. He and his brother, Senator Charles B. Farwell, of Illinois, are the namesake of Farwell, Texas.

== Biography ==
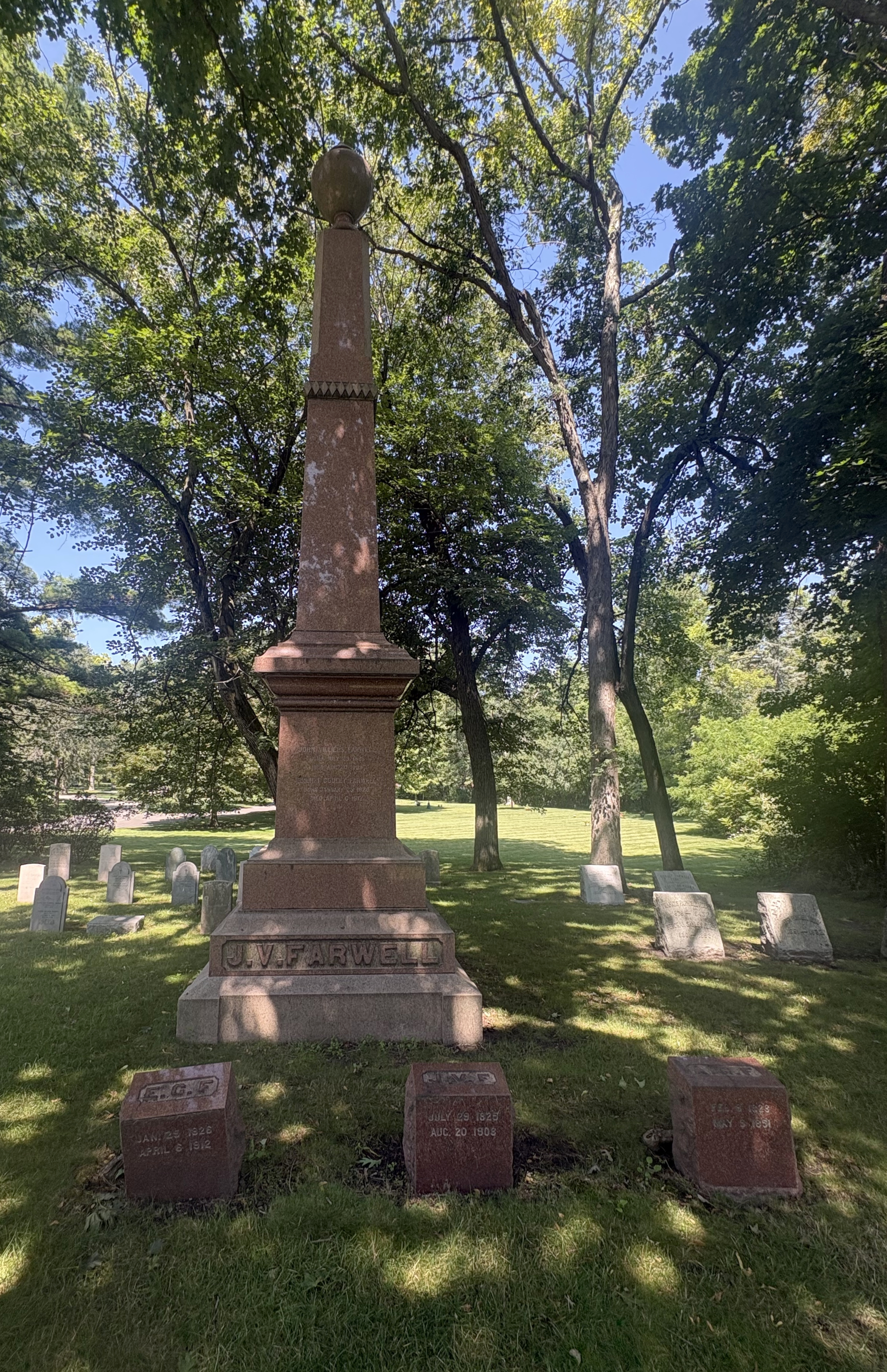
Farwell's grave at Lake Forest Cemetery

John Villiers Farwell was born on July 29, 1825, in Mead's Creek, Steuben County, New York. He was the brother of Charles B. Farwell, who would go on to become a United States senator. When he was thirteen, his father moved the family to a farm in Ogle County, Illinois. Farwell attended Mount Morris Seminary and graduated in 1844. Farwell decided to head to Chicago, Illinois, to seek employment. He worked in the office of the City Clerk of Chicago then joined the dry goods house of Hamilton & White as a bookkeeper. Farwell then took a position at Wadsworth & Phelps. Farwell trained several of Chicago's future prominent businessmen, including Marshall Field and Levi Leiter. Farwell married Abigail G. Taylor, the daughter of Ogle County farmer John G. Taylor, in 1851, but she died after two years.

Farwell was named a partner in the firm, then known as Cooley, Wadsworth & Co., in 1850. He married Emeret C. Cooley in 1854; they had three sons and a daughter. In 1863, Farwell was named senior partner of the firm following the retirement of E. S. Wadsworth. In 1864, the company was restyled Farwell, Field & Co. after Marshall Field and Levi Leiter were admitted to the partnership. However, the next year, Field and Leiter left to join Potter Palmer in what would become Marshall Field & Co. Farwell's dry goods house then became known as John V. Farwell & Co. The company survived the 1871 Great Chicago Fire and was officially incorporated in 1891, when charge of the company was turned over to his sons.

Farwell was an early leader in the history of YMCA, rising to become president of the Chicago chapter. Farwell probably met Dwight L. Moody through YMCA. He was named superintendent of Moody's Illinois Street Church in 1859, holding the position until 1867. He built the first church building for Moody on the corner of Illinois and Wells Streets in 1864. Farwell provided Moody with the financial backing needed to support the institution; Moody even lived in one of Farwell's YMCAs. Farwell was named a trustee of the Moody Bible Institute when it was founded in 1886. During the Civil War, Farwell was President of the Chicago Branch of the United States Christian Commission. A Republican, Farwell was a delegate from Illinois to the 1864 presidential election, supporting Abraham Lincoln. In 1869, President Ulysses S. Grant named Farwell to the Board of Indian Commissioners

A group led by Farwell, his brother Charles, Abner Taylor, and A. C. Babcock was named responsible for constructing the Texas State Capitol in 1879. In exchange for his service as builder, the Farwells were paid with the largest cattle ranch in the world, the 3,050,000-acre (1,230,000 ha) XIT Ranch. The Farwells oversaw a herd of over 150,000 cattle. The ranch proved relatively unprofitable, as cattle prices plunged in the late 1880s. By 1905, the land was mostly subdivided. Farwell was also a member of the Chicago Historical Society and the Union League Club.

He died at his home in Lake Forest, Illinois, on August 20, 1908, following a six-month illness, and was buried at Lake Forest Cemetery. John V. Farwell & Co. maintained its name until it was purchased by Carson, Pirie & Co. in 1926.
