= Charles Howard, 20th Earl of Suffolk =

British peer and bomb disposal expert (1906–1941)

The Right Honourable The Earl of Suffolk GC, FRS, FRSE
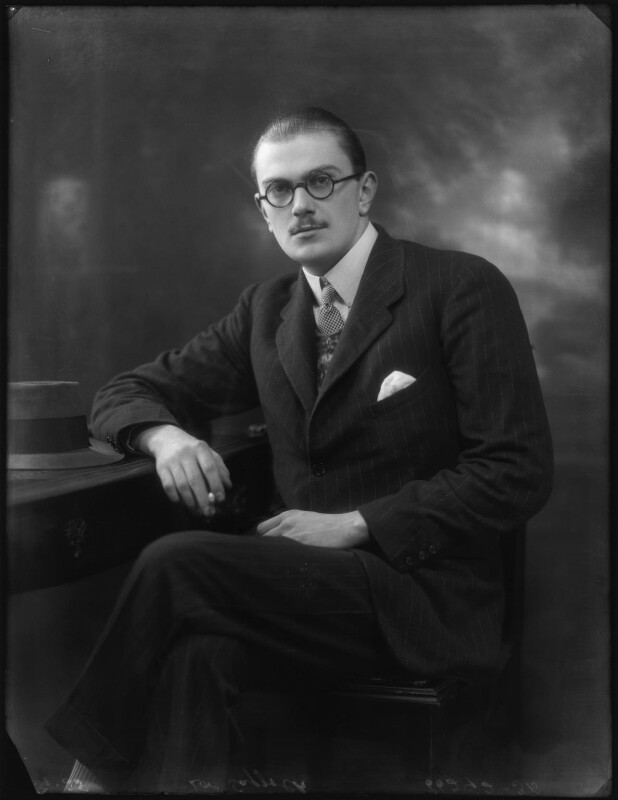
- Lord Suffolk, 1925
- Born: Charles Henry George Howard; 2 March 1906; Charlton Park, Wiltshire, England
- Died: 12 May 1941 (aged 35); Erith Marshes, Kent
- Education: Royal Naval College, Osborne; Radley College
- Alma mater: University of Edinburgh
- Spouse: Mimi Forde Pigott (m. 1934)
- Children: 3, including Michael
- Parents: Henry Howard, 19th Earl of Suffolk (father); Margaret Leiter (mother)
- Family: Howard
- Honours: George Cross

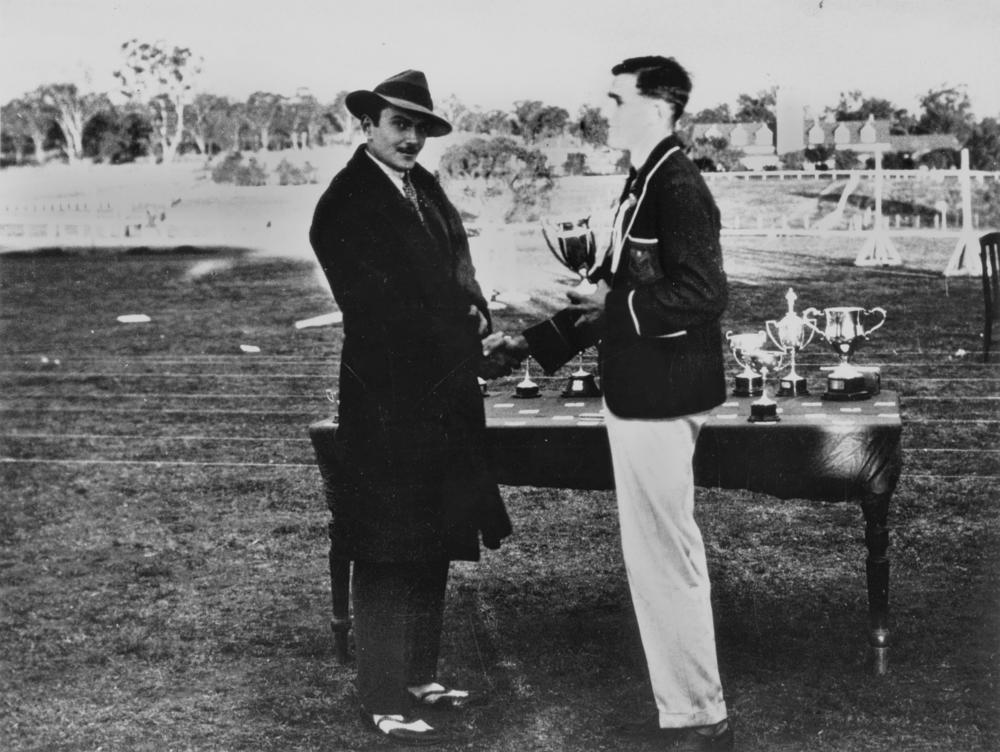
Presentation of sporting cups at Scots College, Warwick, c. 1929

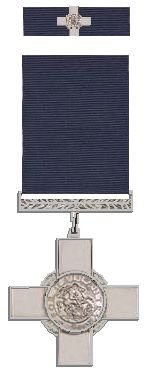
George Cross and its ribbon bar

Charles "Jack" Henry George Howard, 20th Earl of Suffolk, 13th Earl of Berkshire, GC, FRS, FRSE (2 March 1906 – 12 May 1941), styled Viscount Andover until 1917, was an English peer and bomb disposal expert, who belonged to the ancient Howard family.

He is most famous for rescuing a team of French nuclear scientists and transporting the entire world stockpile of heavy water from France to Britain in the face of the imminent French defeat in 1940. He was known by the nicknames Mad Jack and Wild Jack, and although he was generally referred to in aristocratic circles as Suffolk, he was better known in the workaday world as Jack Howard (or more officially Charles Howard).

He was killed in action in 1941.

== Early life ==
Suffolk was born at Charlton Park, Wiltshire, the eldest son of Henry Howard, 19th Earl of Suffolk. His American-born mother, the former Margaret Hyde Leiter (aka "Daisy"), was sister of Lady Curzon and daughter of the businessman Levi Leiter.

He had two younger brothers: Hon. Cecil John Arthur Howard (1908–1985), who married American actress Frances Drake; and politician Lt. Cdr. Hon. Greville Reginald Howard (1909–1987).

In 1917, Charles succeeded to the family titles at age 11 when his father was killed at the Battle of Istabulat in the First World War.

After leaving the Royal Naval College, Osborne, at 15, he attended Radley College, but quit in 1923 to join merchant naval service on the windjammer Mount Stewart as an apprentice officer. After his return from a round-the-world voyage, he was commissioned in the Scots Guards but was later asked to resign from his post by his superiors because of his "wild ways". In 1926, he returned to Australia, where he first worked as a jackaroo and later owned a large farm jointly with Captain McColm, who had been master of the Mount Stewart.

He enrolled at the University of Edinburgh, graduating three years later with a first-class honours degree in chemistry and pharmacology. In his early twenties, he was elected a Fellow of the Royal Society of Edinburgh. The Nuffield Institute of Medical Research at the University of Oxford offered him a research post in the area of "explosives and poisons".

== Career ==
As liaison officer for the British Department of Scientific and Industrial Research during the Second World War, Lord Suffolk and his colleague Major A. V. Golding (1902–1992) were posted to Paris. They, and their private secretaries, Eileen Beryl Morden (Suffolk) and Marguerite Nicolle (Golding), left Paris on 10 June 1940 due to the impending fall of France.

From there they made their way to Bordeaux, where representatives of the British embassy introduced them to the master of the British tramp ship SS Broompark, which was one of many standing by to carry refugees to safety. They embarked 33 eminent scientists, with their families. Two more scientists, Lew Kowarski and Hans von Halban, arrived with the heavy water.

Then the managing director of the Antwerp Diamond Bank, Paul Timbal, joined, with $10 million worth of gem diamonds. They discovered 600 tons of machine tools in wagons on the quay, which were also loaded.

The Broompark carried them safely to Falmouth, from where a special train took her passengers and cargo to London. The diamonds were placed in the vaults of the Diamond Corporation and most of the heavy water was sent to Windsor Castle, where it was stored alongside the Crown Jewels, until needed.

Suffolk's approach to his missions earned him the nickname "Mad Jack" or "Wild Jack". Herbert Morrison, Minister of Supply, later described him as "one of the most remarkable young men employed by the Government on dangerous missions". Morrison told the House of Commons, when in Secret Session, that "a considerable service has been rendered to the Allied cause by the safe arrival of this shipload".

=== Bomb disposal career and death ===
Following his return from France, Lord Suffolk worked for the Ministry of Supply as a research officer learning how to defuse bombs of new and unknown types. He served as part of an unexploded bomb detachment in London during the Blitz. The detachment consisted of himself, his secretary Morden, and his chauffeur, Fred Hards. They called themselves "the Holy Trinity" and they became famed for their prowess in detecting and successfully tackling 34 unexploded bombs with "urbane and smiling efficiency". Morden stood by his side taking notes, as Lord Suffolk worked at defusing the bombs.

He looked on each bomb as a new challenge — examining it from all angles, listening to it, his fingers exploring the metal shell, and dictating his conclusions and the method he proposed to use in disarming the bomb to Eileen Morden when the time came for her to take shelter. If anything went wrong, then at least others would not make the same mistake. An official report underlined the strain of his work: "On many occasions Lord Suffolk cleared everyone away from the danger area and proceeded to operate alone. Deliberately he exposed himself daily to danger." He was a fatalist saying that "if my name is on a bomb, that's it".

The 35th bomb blew up on Erith Marshes in Kent on 12 May 1941, killing all three. The bomb, a 250 kg (550 lb) weapon, was at one of the so-called "bomb cemeteries", on open ground on the marshes. Bombs were transferred here after being temporarily made safe for transport and then destroyed using controlled explosions.

The bomb had been dropped some six months earlier, during the previous autumn, and after removal and transfer to the marshes had been at Erith for so long it had been known to the sappers as "Old Faithful". It contained two fuzes, a Type (17) and a Type (50); these two types were in short supply to the Bomb Disposal Sections, intact fuzes being required for instructional purposes, and it was to recover the fuzes that Lord Suffolk was dealing with the bomb. The Type (17) was a delayed-action fuze containing a clockwork mechanism, while the Type (50) was an anti-handling device containing a motion sensor.

The Germans had added a Zus 40 booby trap to some bombs, that detonated when the Type (17) was withdrawn. The Zus 40 was below the other fuze and so was not visible until the obvious fuze was partially withdrawn from its pocket. At lunchtime on 12 May, Lord Suffolk had telephoned his office to say that the Type (17) was ticking and that he had sent for an Mk II KIM clock-stopper. By 14:45 this was in place along with a stethoscope and preparations were being made to sterilise the bomb with steam. As two sappers were going to fetch water for the steamer, the bomb exploded. The explosion killed 14 people: Suffolk, Hards, Morden (who died in the ambulance) and eleven other people who had been nearby, including five sappers who had been working with Suffolk on the bomb. It was later surmised that a Zus 40 may have been triggered as Lord Suffolk was removing it.

== Personal life ==
In 1934, he married London-born English actress and ballet dancer Minnie Mabel "Mimi" Forde Pigott (21 December 1897 – 22 February 1966); they had three children:

- Michael Howard, 21st Earl of Suffolk (27 March 1935 – 9 August 2022)
- Hon. Maurice David Henry Howard (3 November 1936 – 22 November 2018), who married Vicky Summers, of Newcastle-upon-Tyne, in 1978.
- Hon. Patrick Greville Howard (born 18 August 1940); who married Mary Johnson, of Mayfair, London, in 1966.

=== Accolades, honours and memorials ===
On 18 July 1941, the London Gazette announced that King George VI had awarded Lord Suffolk a posthumous George Cross "for conspicuous bravery in connection with bomb disposal".

Sir Winston Churchill, in "Their Finest Hour", the second volume of his book The Second World War reminisced:

One bomb disposal squad I remember which may be taken as symbolic of many others. It consisted of three people, the Earl of Suffolk, his lady private secretary and his chauffeur. They called themselves 'The Holy Trinity'. Their prowess and continued existence got around among all who knew and 34 unexploded bombs did they tackle with urbane and smiling efficiency, but the 35th claimed its forfeit. Up went the Earl of Suffolk in his Holy Trinity. But we may be sure that, as for Mr. Valiant-for-Truth, all the trumpets sounded for them on the other side.

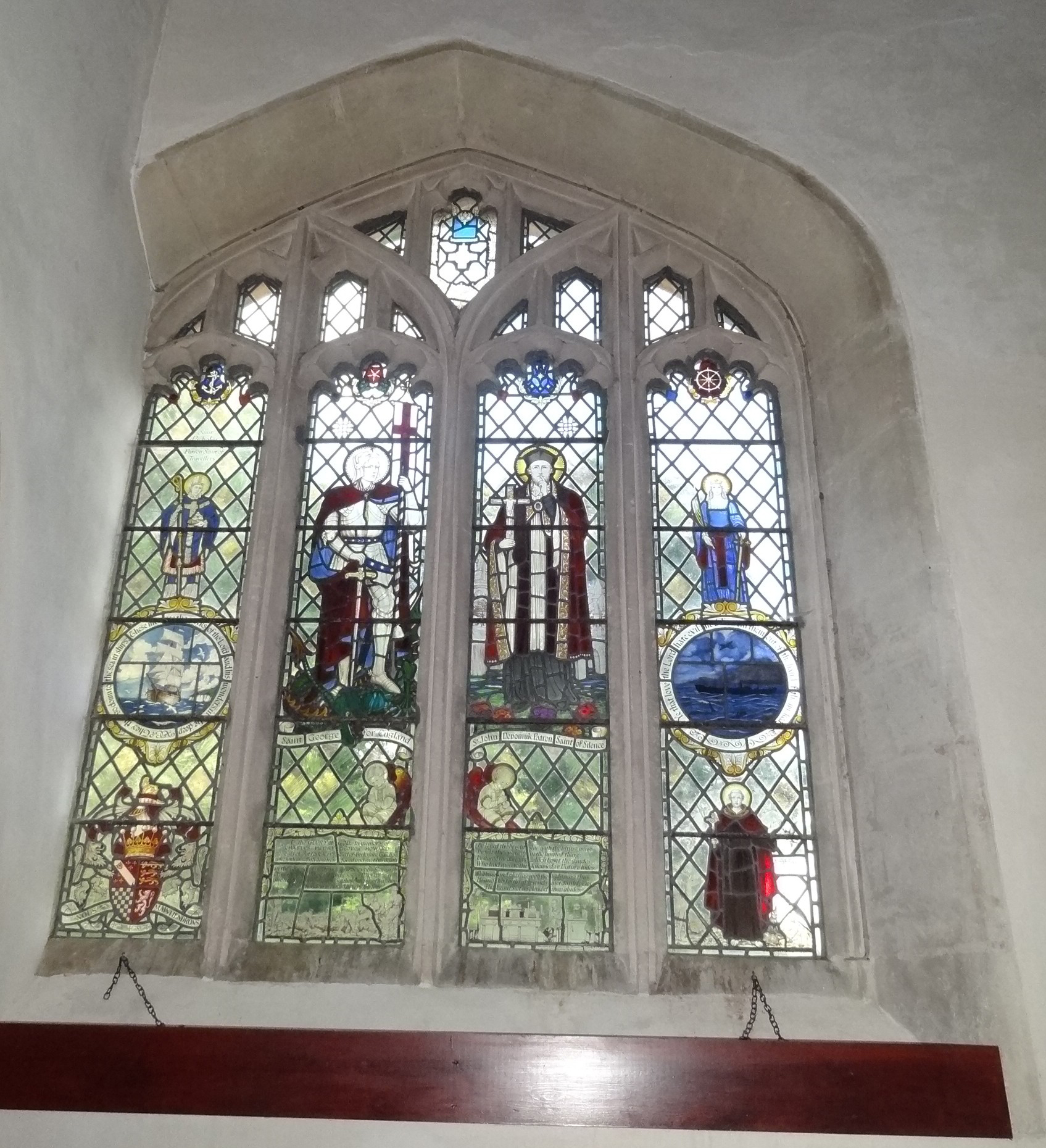
Memorial to Charles Howard, 20th Earl of Suffolk at the Church of St John the Baptist, Charlton

A stained glass window designed by Gerald Smith of St John's Wood was dedicated by Frederic Cockin, the Bishop of Bristol, at a special service on 15 September 1947, at the Church of St John the Baptist, Charlton, in north-west Wiltshire. Charlton Park and its estate belonged to the Suffolk family. The stained glass in the central panel above the four main lights shows the George Cross. The two main figures are the saints George and John of Nepomuk. St George is trampling on the defeated dragon, a symbol of evil. St John of Nepomuk, a fourteenth-century priest from Bohemia is the patron saint of silence. His inclusion in the window is possibly a reference to the great concentration needed in all scientific activity, particularly in bomb disposal, and also (as with St George), to having suffered martyrdom for his beliefs. At the bottom of the panel is the Suffolk coat of arms. In the right-hand light is a picture of SS Broompark, the vessel in which Lord Suffolk made his remarkable escape from Bordeaux. The picture shows the moment a German plane appeared above the ship, but flew off without attacking. St Catherine of Alexandria, above, is the patron saint of science and also a martyr. Below is St Francis of Assisi, patron saint of birds and animals (Lord Suffolk loved animals and hated hunting and shooting). At the bottom of the two central lights, two scenes are depicted in fascinating detail. One shows work taking place in a laboratory, the other the dangerous business of bomb disposal. Above the bomb disposal squad is an inscription in memory of Lord Suffolk and those who died with him. Finally, above the scene in the laboratory is displayed a poem by John Masefield, Poet Laureate of the United Kingdom, written by him upon hearing the news of Jack Howard's death:

He loved the bright ship with the lifting wing;
He felt the anguish in the hunted thing;
He dared the dangers which beset the guides;
Who lead men to the knowledge nature hides;
Probing and playing with the lightning thus;
He and his faithful friends met death for us;
The beauty of a splendid man abides.

In 1973, the BBC based a television series on the life of Lord Suffolk. Ronald Pickup played the leading role in The Dragon's Opponent. Suffolk has a role in Michael Ondaatje's novel, The English Patient, as well as being a major character in Neal Stephenson's "Bomb Light" Trilogy.

Peerage of England
Preceded by Henry Howard	Earl of Suffolk; 1917–1941	Succeeded by Michael Howard
Preceded by Henry Howard	Earl of Berkshire; 1917–1941	Succeeded by Michael Howard
