= Collector of Internal Revenue for the First District of Illinois =

Government office in Illinois, US

- Seat: Chicago, Illinois
- Appointer: President of the United States
- Formation: 1862
- First holder: George Schneider
- Final holder: John T. Jarecki
- Abolished: 1953

The Collector of Internal Revenue for the First District of Illinois was an office created by the Revenue Act of 1862, the holder of which was responsible for the collection of income tax in the First District of Illinois, headquartered in Chicago. The First District was the largest tax collection district in the State of Illinois, and numerous important political figures received a patronage appointment to the office. By 1920, the First District had grown to encompass the counties of Boone, Bureau, Carroll, Cook, DeKalb, DuPage, Grundy, Henderson, Henry, Jo Daviess, Kane, Kankakee, Kendall, Knox, Lake, LaSalle, Lee, McHenry, Marshall, Mercer, Ogle, Peoria, Putnam, Rock Island, Stark, Stephenson, Warren, Whiteside, Will, and Winnebago. The office was abolished in 1953, following the reorganization of the Bureau of Internal Revenue into the Internal Revenue Service.

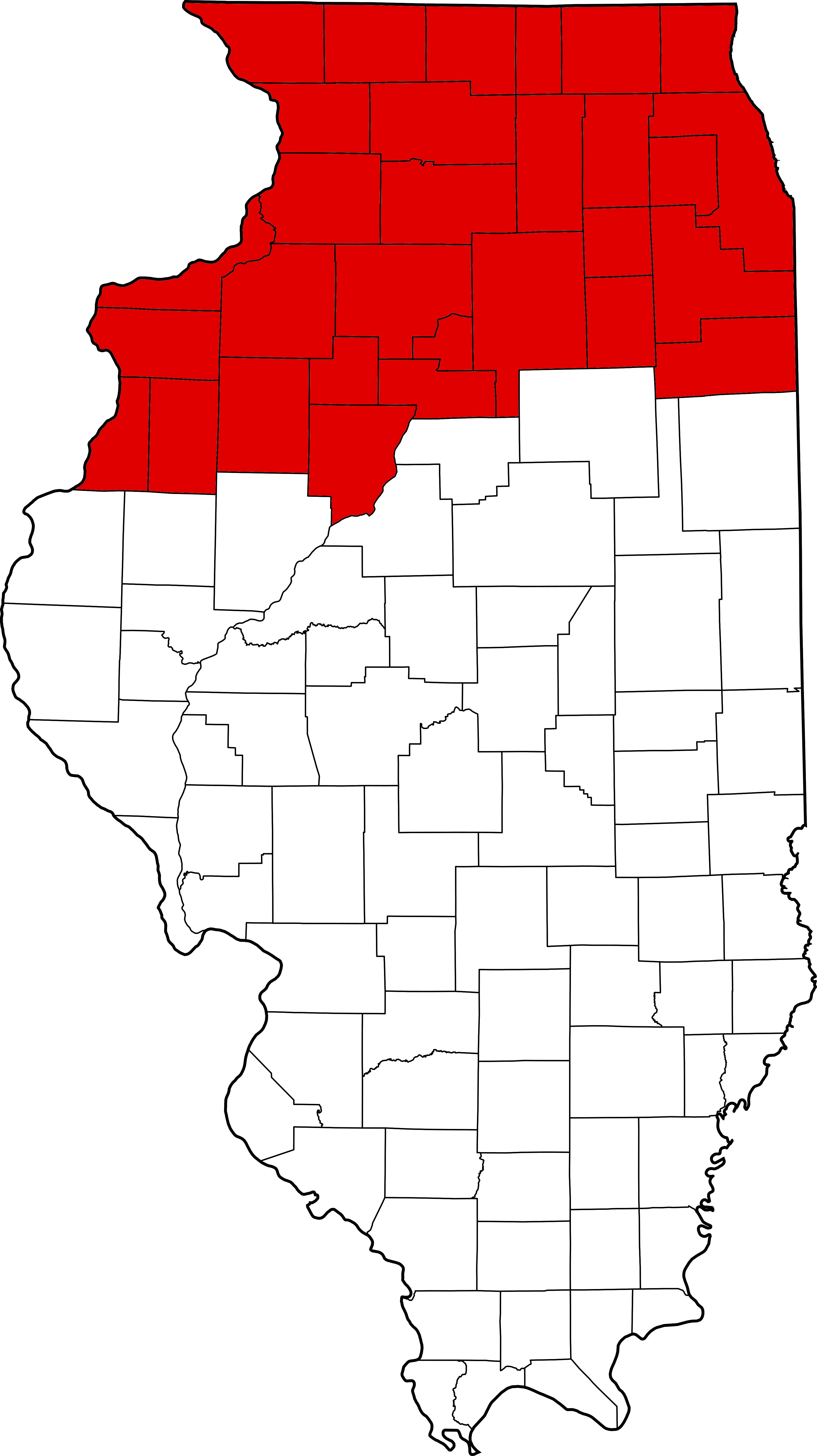
Map of the First District of Illinois

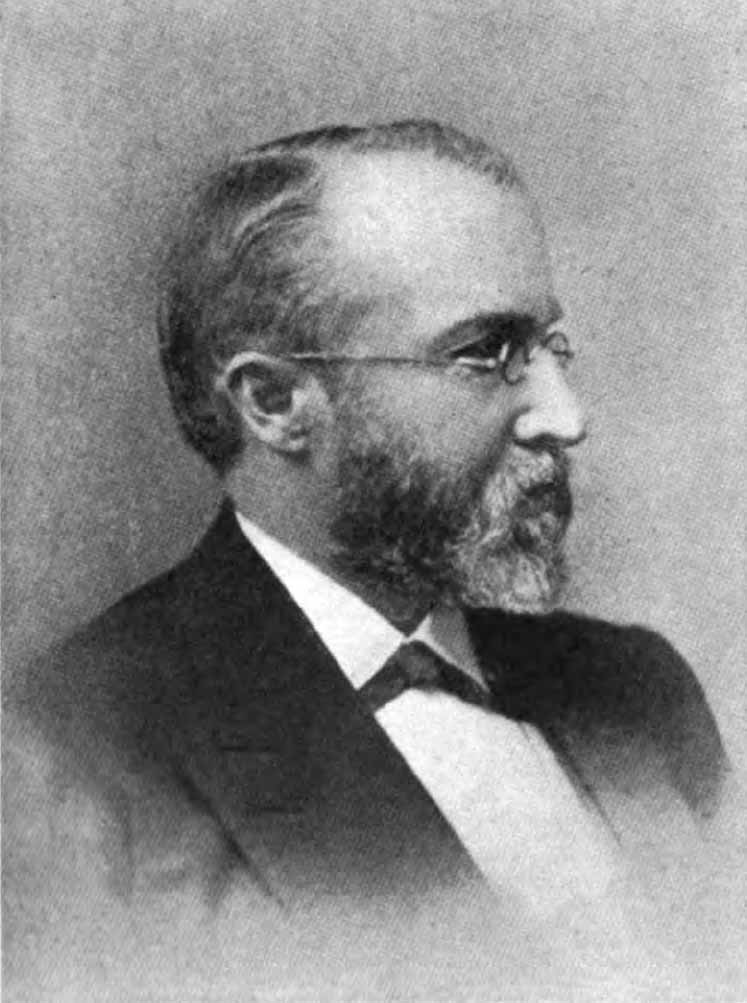
George Schneider, the first appointed Collector

== Officeholders ==
=== Collector of Internal Revenue, 1st District of Illinois, 1862–1953 ===
#	Name	Political Party	Term
1	George Schneider	Republican	August 28, 1862 - June 26, 1866
2	Orrin L. Mann	Republican	June 26, 1866 – June 18, 1868
3	John M. Corse	Democratic	June 18, 1868 – April 19, 1869
4	Edmund Jüssen	Republican	April 19, 1869 – December 1869
5	Hermann Raster	Republican	December 1869 – March 30, 1872
6	Samuel A. Irvin	Republican	April 8, 1872 - 1874
7	Philip Wadsworth	Republican	1874–1875
8	Joseph Dana Webster	Republican	1875 - April 12, 1876
9	F.H. Battershall	Republican	March 12, 1876–March 31, 1876 (acting)
10	Joel D. Harvey	Republican	March 1876–1885
11	Rensselaer Stone	Democratic	1885–1890
12	Christopher Mamer	Republican	1890–1893
13	William J. Mize	Democratic	1893–1897
14	Frederick E. Coyne	Republican	1897–1901
15	Henry L. Hertz	Republican	1901–1910
16	Samuel M. Fitch	Republican	1910–1917
17	Julius Smietanka	Democratic	1917–1920
18	Harry W. Mager	Republican	1920–1921
19	John C. Cannon	Republican	1921–1923
20	Mabel G. Reinecke	Republican	1923–1931
21	Gregory T. Van Meter	Democratic	1931–1934
22	Carter H. Harrison	Democratic	1934–December 31, 1944
23	Nigel D. Campbell	Democratic	January 1, 1945–July 31, 1947
24	John T. Jarecki	Democratic	1947–1953
