= Joseph Dana Webster =

Union Army general

Joseph D. Webster
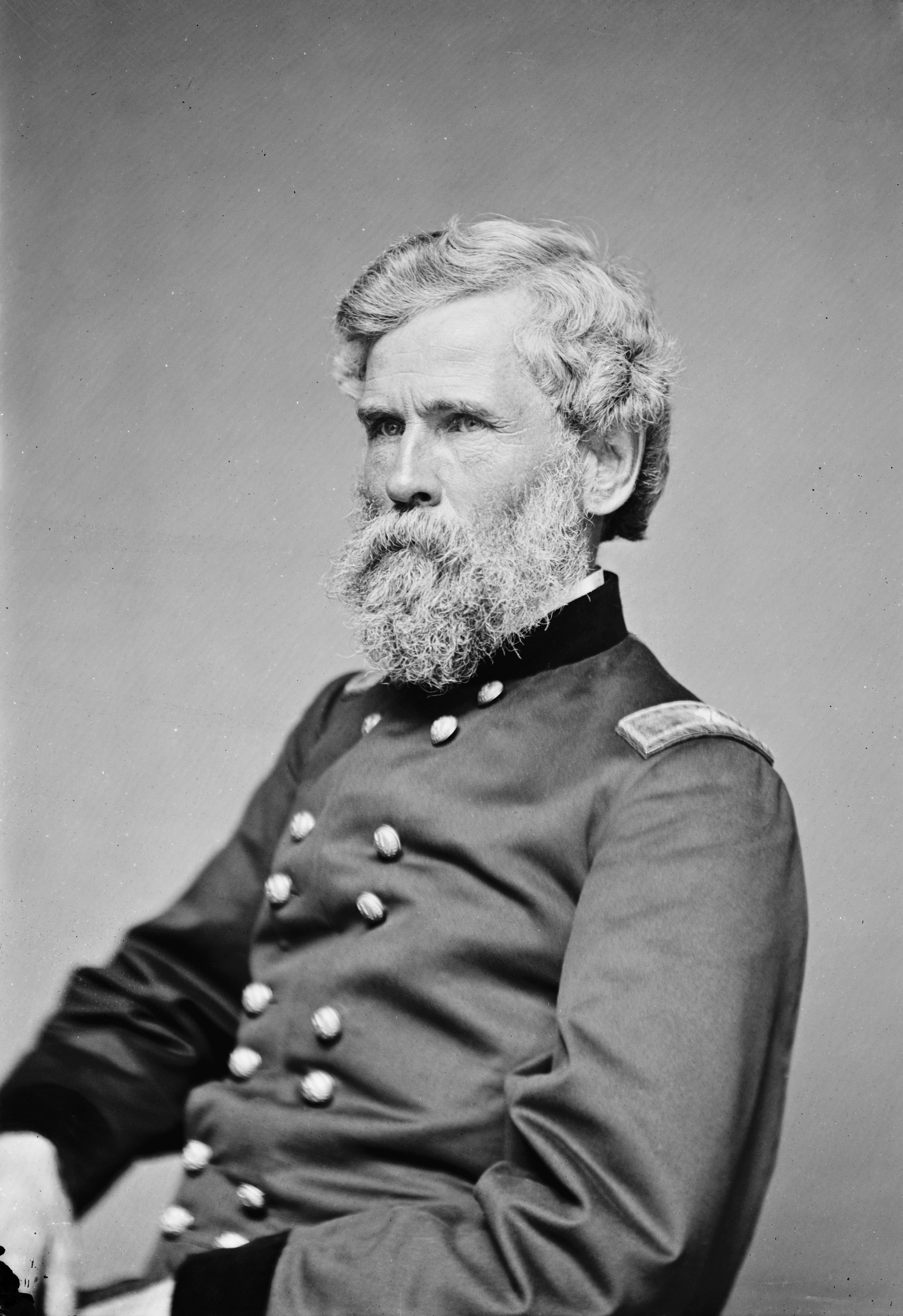
- c. 1865

Collector of Internal Revenue for the First District of Illinois
- In office 1875 - April 12, 1876
- Appointed by: Ulysses S. Grant
- Preceded by: Philip Wadsworth
- Succeeded by: F.H. Battershall

Personal details
- Born: August 25, 1811 Hampton, New Hampshire, U.S.
- Died: April 12, 1876 (aged 64) Chicago, Illinois, U.S.
- Resting place: Rosehill Cemetery, Chicago, Illinois, U.S.

Military service
- Allegiance: United States of America; Union
- Branch/service: United States Army; Union Army
- Years of service: 1838-54, 1861-65
- Rank: Brigadier General; Brevet Major General
- Battles/wars: Mexican War; American Civil War: Battle of Belmont; Battle of Fort Henry; Battle of Fort Donelson; Battle of Shiloh; Battle of Corinth; Siege of Vicksburg; Atlanta campaign; March to the Sea; Carolinas campaign

Joseph Dana Webster (August 25, 1811 – April 12, 1876) was an American civil engineer and soldier most noted for administrative services during the American Civil War, where he served as chief of staff to both Ulysses S. Grant and William T. Sherman.

== Career ==
Webster was born in New Hampshire in 1811. He graduated from Dartmouth College in 1832 and worked as a civil engineer. He joined the U.S. army in 1838, serving as 2nd lieutenant in the U.S. Topographical Engineers. He fought in the Mexican–American War and by 1853 was captain of the U.S. Engineers. He resigned from the Army in 1854.

A few years later the outbreak of the Civil War brought Webster back into the service of the army. On June 1, 1861 he was appointed major in the U.S. Army Paymasters. In September he became chief of staff to Ulysses S. Grant. On February 1, 1862 Webster was appointed colonel of the 1st Illinois Light Artillery Regiment, but remained as Grant's chief of staff through the battles of Belmont, Fort Henry, Fort Donelson, and Shiloh.

On the eve of the first day's fighting at Shiloh, Webster was instrumental in massing the artillery in support of Grant's last line of defense near Pittsburg Landing. On April 4, 1863, President Abraham Lincoln appointed Webster to the grade of brigadier general of U.S. volunteers, to rank from November 29, 1862. In early November 1862, Webster was assigned as the superintendent of railroads in the Department of the Tennessee. He next served as the Chief of Transportation for the Army of the Tennessee, during the siege of Vicksburg, and later for the entire Military Division of Mississippi.

When William T. Sherman became commander of the Military Division of Mississippi he selected General Webster as his chief of staff. Webster served Sherman in this capacity through the Atlanta campaign, March to the Sea and the Carolinas campaign. On March 13, 1865, Webster was brevetted to major general of U.S. volunteers Webster resigned from the volunteers on November 6, 1865. On January 13, 1866, President Andrew Johnson nominated Webster for appointment to the grade of brevet major general of volunteers, to rank from March 13, 1865, and the United States Senate confirmed the appointment on March 12, 1866.

After the war he worked as a collector for the Bureau of Internal Revenue. Webster died at Chicago, Illinois on March 12, 1876 and was buried as Rosehill Cemetery.

Preceded by Philip Wadsworth	Collector of Internal Revenue for the 1st District of Illinois; 1875 - 1876	Succeeded by F.H. Battershall
