= James M. Wayne =

US Supreme Court justice from 1835 to 1867

James Wayne
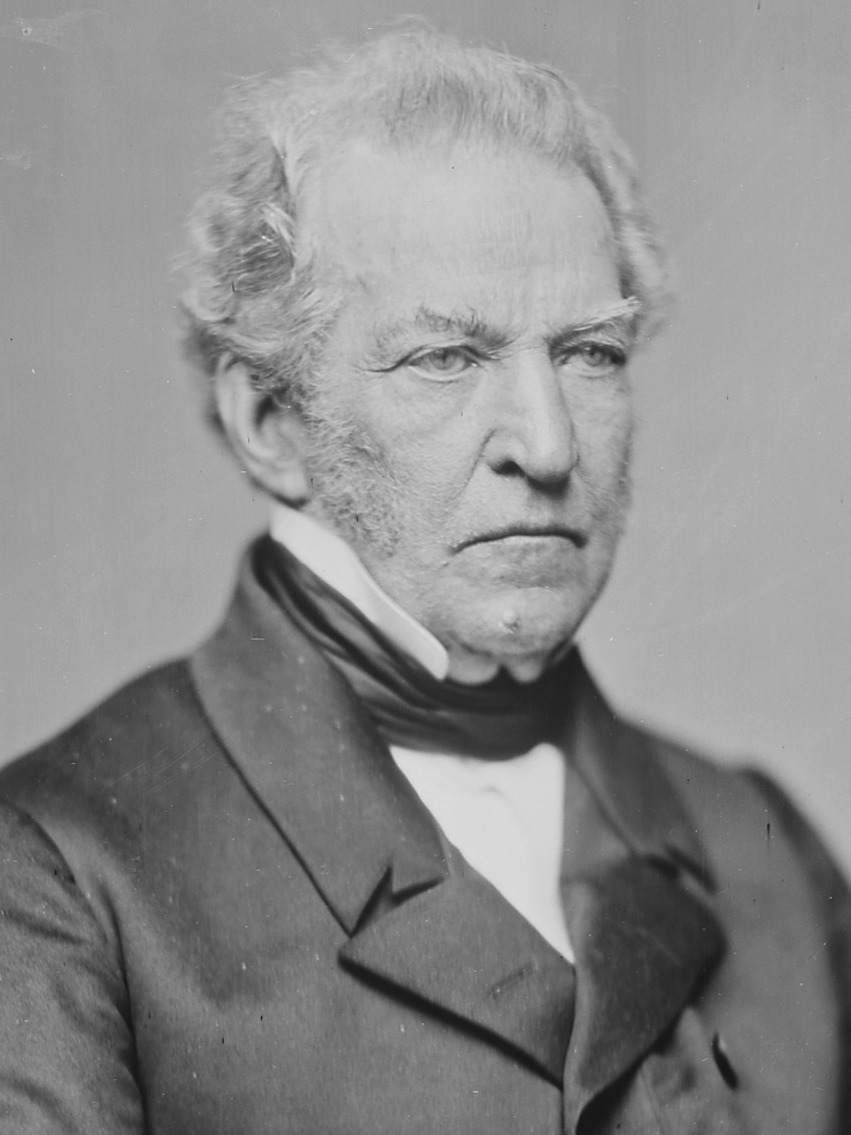
- Wayne, c. 1860-1865

Associate Justice of the Supreme Court of the United States
- In office January 14, 1835 – July 5, 1867
- Nominated by: Andrew Jackson
- Preceded by: William Johnson
- Succeeded by: Seat abolished

Chair of the House Foreign Affairs Committee
- In office February 22, 1834 – January 13, 1835
- Preceded by: William Archer
- Succeeded by: John Mason

Member of the U.S. House of Representatives from Georgia's at-large district
- In office March 4, 1829 – January 13, 1835
- Preceded by: George Gilmer
- Succeeded by: Jabez Jackson

16th Mayor of Savannah, Georgia
- In office September 8, 1817 – July 12, 1819
- Preceded by: Thomas Charlton
- Succeeded by: Thomas Charlton

Member of the Georgia House of Representatives
- In office 1815–1816

Personal details
- Born: 1790 Savannah, Georgia, U.S.
- Died: July 5, 1867 (aged 76–77) Washington, D.C., U.S.
- Resting place: Laurel Grove Cemetery
- Party: Democratic
- Other political affiliations: Jacksonian
- Spouse: Mary Johnson (m. 1813)
- Children: 2, including Henry
- Education: Princeton University (BA)

Military service
- Allegiance: United States
- Branch/service: United States Army
- Years of service: 1812–1815
- Rank: Captain
- Unit: Chatham Light Dragoons
- Battles/wars: War of 1812

James Moore Wayne (1790 – July 5, 1867) was an American attorney, judge and politician who served as an associate justice of the Supreme Court of the United States from 1835 to 1867. He previously served as the sixteenth mayor of Savannah, Georgia, from 1817 to 1819 and the member of the United States House of Representatives for Georgia's at-large congressional district from 1829 to 1835, when he was appointed to the Supreme Court by President Andrew Jackson. He was a member of the Democratic Party.

== Early life ==
Wayne was born in Savannah, Georgia, in 1790. He was the son of Richard Wayne, who came to America in 1760, and married Elizabeth (née Clifford) Wayne on September 14, 1769. James' mother died in 1804 when James was fourteen years old. A sister, Mary, became the great-grandmother of Juliette Gordon Low, the founder of the Girl Scouts of the USA. She was also the 2nd great-grandmother of governor Endicott Peabody. Another sister, Eliza, married noted Savannah merchant George Anderson.

After completing preparatory studies, Wayne attended The College of New Jersey (today known as Princeton University), where he graduated in 1808. After Princeton, he read law to be admitted to the bar in 1810, and began his practice in Savannah.

== Career ==
From 1812 to 1815, during the War of 1812, he served in the United States Army as a captain in the Chatham Light Dragoons, now known as the Georgia Hussars. He served in the Georgia House of Representatives from 1815 to 1816. He then served as mayor of Savannah from 1817 to 1819, thereafter returning to private practice in Savannah until 1824.

He then served as a judge, first of the Court of Common Pleas in Savannah, Georgia from 1819 to 1824, and then of the Superior Court of Georgia from 1824 to 1829, until he was elected as a Jacksonian to the United States House of Representatives, serving from March 4, 1829, to January 13, 1835.

He resigned his seat in the House to accept the appointment as an associate justice to the Supreme Court. He was nominated by President Andrew Jackson on January 7, 1835, to a seat vacated by William Johnson, and was confirmed by the United States Senate on January 14, 1835, receiving his commission the same day. He served on the court until his death on July 5, 1867. He favored free trade, opposed internal improvements by Congress (except of rivers and harbors), and opposed the rechartering of the United States Bank.

=== U.S. Supreme Court ===
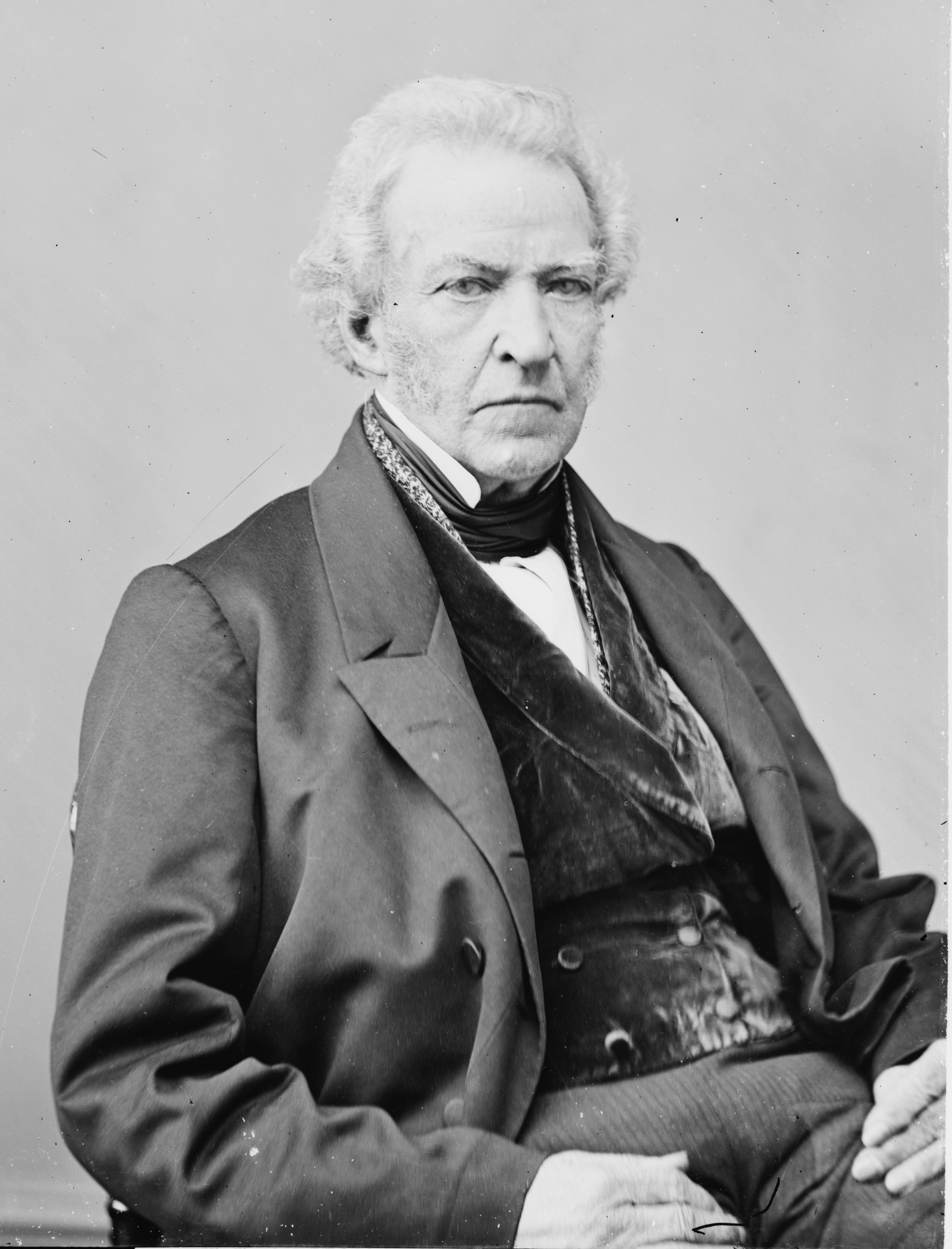
Wayne in his elder years

While Wayne served his time as an associate justice he heard many cases about slavery, tax, and reform. A Jacksonian, Wayne agreed with President Jackson on the ideals of deepening rivers and harbors, but disagreed on the expansions of highways and canals. Wayne also agreed with Jackson on the Indian Removal Act and believed that the land that used to belong to the Indians would belong to the state. The fact that Wayne refused to accept the Indians as an independent nation and forced them to move west made him appealing to Georgians. Wayne was a Southern Unionist, and against the formation of the Confederate States of America, despite the fact that he was from the state of Georgia. As a Unionist in a southern state, Wayne took a careful approach on the ideals of nullification and consolidation.

While Justice Wayne himself remained loyal to the Union, his son Henry C. Wayne served as a general in the Confederate Army.

==== Louisville, Cincinnati & Charleston Railroad Co. v. Letson ====
In 1844, Justice Wayne heard the case Louisville, Cincinnati & Charleston Railroad Co. v. Letson. This case was about a man named Letson who brought a contract against a railroad company, claiming that the cities did not fulfill the contract with him for the expansion of the road. It centered on the principle that a citizen in a particular state should have the right to sue a corporation, which is based in another state and even conducts its business in another state. Justice Wayne opened his statement regarding the case when he said, "The jurisdiction of the court is denied in this case upon the grounds that two members of the corporation sued are citizens of North Carolina; that the state of South Carolina is also a member, and that two other corporations in South Carolina are members, having in them members who are citizens of the same state with the defendant in error" (43 U.S. 497, 555). Later in his statement, Justice Wayne commented, "A corporation created by a state to perform its functions under the authority of that state and only suable there, though it may have members out of the state, seems to us to be a person, though an artificial one, inhabiting and belonging to that state, and therefore entitled, for the purpose of suing and being sued, to be deemed a citizen of that state" (43 U.S. 497, 555). In these statements, Justice Wayne was explaining how owners stopped being relevant and that businesses now had easy accessibility to federal courts. This case was instrumental as it showed the view of the Supreme Court that corporations could be viewed as 'citizens' of the states where they were incorporated. This court case was significant in Justice Wayne's career and development because it showed that he was willing to increase dominion in the courts.

==== Dred Scott v. Sandford ====
The court case of Dred Scott v. Sandford was argued in front of the United States Supreme Court, and was decided for Sanford by a 7–2 vote on March 6, 1857, with Chief Justice Roger B. Taney giving the majority opinion and Justice Wayne concurring. This landmark decision against slave Dred Scott ruled that African-Americans, whether slave or free, were not to be considered American citizens and thus could not sue in federal court. The ruling also found the Missouri Compromise unconstitutional, ruling that it violated the Fifth Amendment to the United States Constitution, and that, therefore, the federal government had no jurisdiction to regulate slavery on federal property. Though the Court thought this ruling would put to rest the question of slavery, it exacerbated tensions and may have led directly to the American Civil War, which resulted in the Thirteenth Amendment to the United States Constitution (1865) abolishing slavery, the Civil Rights Act of 1866, and the Fourteenth Amendment to the United States Constitution (1868), granting equal citizenship to African-Americans.

In Dred Scott v. Sandford, Taney wrote that the Constitution viewed people of African American descent as an "inferior order and altogether unfit to associate with the white race either in social or political relations, and so far inferior that they had no rights which the white man was bound to respect" (60 U.S. 393). The vast majority of scholars and historians view this decision, which Justice Wayne concurred with, as one of, if not the worst to ever be handed down by the Court. Justice Wayne wrote: "Concurring as I do entirely in the opinion of the court as it has been written and read by the Chief Justice" (60 U.S. 393), he went on to write that he concurred in "assuming that the Circuit Court had jurisdiction," but he abstained from expressing any opinion upon the eighth section of the act of 1820, known commonly as the Missouri Compromise law, and "six of us declare that it was unconstitutional" (60 U.S. 393).

==== Judicial views ====
Justice Wayne served on the Supreme Court for 32 years, one of the longest terms for any justice. His leanings stayed consistent and many of his decisions believed power resides in the federal offices such as the U.S. Congress. He held to this in the Dred Scott case, supporting Chief Justice Taney's opinion in the face of harsh criticism by many. With the beginning of the Civil War, Wayne was thrust into personal and professional crisis. He chose to remain with the Court while his own son left the U.S. Army to fight as a general in the Confederate Army. Another one of his colleagues, John Campbell, also left the Court to serve in the Confederacy. However, Wayne held to his nationalistic views, although it made him unpopular in his home state of Georgia, believing there was no legal support for a state to secede. He also felt that by remaining on the Court he could continue to support Southern causes. After the war ended, he never forgot his Southern roots and labored hard to protect the South from penalties.

As of the time of his death in 1867, Wayne was the last veteran of the Marshall Court remaining on the bench.

In order to prevent President Andrew Johnson from appointing any justices, Congress passed the Judicial Circuits Act in 1866, eliminating three of the 10 seats from the Supreme Court as they became vacant, with the intent of eventually reducing the size of the Court to seven justices. The vacancy caused by the death of Justice John Catron in 1865 had not been filled, so, upon Wayne's death, there were eight justices on the Court. In 1869 Congress passed the Circuit Judges Act, setting the size of the Court at nine members. The Court still had eight justices at the time of this Act, so one new seat was created, which was ultimately filled on March 21, 1870, by Joseph Philo Bradley (in the meantime, William Strong had filled the seat vacated by Robert Cooper Grier).

== Personal life ==
On March 4, 1813, Wayne was married to Mary Johnson Campbell (1794–1889). Mary was the daughter of Alexander Campbell (a grandson of the Scottish-born Rev. Archibald Maciver Campbell) and Mehitable Hetty (née Hylton) Campbell. Together, Mary and James were the parents of two surviving children:

- Henry Constantine Wayne (1815–1883), who married Mary Louisa Nicoll (1821–1873), a daughter of Henry Woodhull Nicoll, in 1842. Mary's older sister, Elizabeth Smith Nicoll, was the wife of Gen. Alexander Hamilton, oldest grandson of Alexander Hamilton.
- Mary Campbell Wayne (1818–1885), who married Dr. Brig.-Gen. John Meck Cuyler on October 15, 1840. Mary and John were the grandparents of Mary "May" Caroline Campbell Cuyler, who married Sir Philip Grey Egerton, 12th Baronet in 1893.

Between 1818 and 1820, he built a Regency-style home at 10 East Oglethorpe Avenue in Savannah. In 1831, he sold his home to his niece, Sarah Anderson (née Stites) Gordon and her husband, William Washington Gordon, who studied law under Wayne and later served as the mayor of Savannah. Sarah and William were Juliette's grandparents. Today, the home is called the Juliette Gordon Low Birthplace.

Wayne died on July 5, 1867, in Washington, D.C., and was interred in Laurel Grove Cemetery in Savannah.

=== Legacy and honors ===
During World War II the Liberty ship SS James M. Wayne was built in Brunswick, Georgia, and named in his honor.

The Georgia Historical Society holds a collection of James Moore Wayne's papers. The collection is available for research and contains correspondence and miscellaneous papers, dating 1848 to 1863. Wayne was President of the Georgia Historical Society from 1841 to 1854, and then again from 1856 to 1862.

== See also ==
- List of justices of the Supreme Court of the United States
- List of United States Supreme Court justices by time in office
- United States Supreme Court cases during the Chase Court
- United States Supreme Court cases during the Marshall Court
- United States Supreme Court cases during the Taney Court
- List of United States federal judges by longevity of service

Political offices
Preceded by Thomas Charlton	Mayor of Savannah; 1817–1819	Succeeded by Thomas Charlton
U.S. House of Representatives
Preceded by George Gilmer	Member of the U.S. House of Representatives from Georgia's at-large congressional district 1829–1835	Succeeded by Jabez Jackson
Preceded by William Archer	Chair of the House Foreign Affairs Committee; 1834–1835	Succeeded by John Mason
Legal offices
Preceded by William Johnson	Associate Justice of the Supreme Court of the United States; 1835–1867	Seat abolished
