= 6th Iowa Infantry Regiment =

Infantry regiment in the American Civil War

- Iowa flag
- Active: July 17, 1861, to July 21, 1865
- Country: United States
- Allegiance: Union
- Branch: Infantry
- Engagements: Battle of Shiloh; Siege of Corinth; Siege of Vicksburg; Battle of Chattanooga; Battle of Lookout Mountain; Battle of Missionary Ridge; Battle of Resaca; Battle of Kennesaw Mountain; Battle of Jonesborough; March to the Sea; Battle of Bentonville

The 6th Iowa Infantry Regiment was an infantry regiment that served in the Union Army during the American Civil War. The regiment was organized at Burlington, Iowa on July 17, 1861, and mustered out of service on July 21, 1865, in Louisville, Kentucky.

== Service ==
The 6th Iowa Infantry was organized at Burlington, Iowa and mustered into Federal forces on July 17, 1861, by United States Army lieutenant Alexander Chambers. On August 6, 1861, Colonel John Adair McDowell received orders to proceed to Keokuk, Iowa, where he received arms for six companies of his regiment and immediately marched across the Missouri border to help the 5th Iowa Infantry prevent a threatened invasion of Iowa by Confederate troops. On September 19, 1861, the regiment left Benton Barracks and was transported by rail to Jefferson City, Missouri.

On March 7, 1862, the regiment was ordered to join the Army of Tennessee. On March 16, 1862, the regiment left Pittsburg Landing, Tennessee and was assigned to the First Brigade of the 5th Division, which was commanded by William Tecumseh Sherman and Colonel McDowell. On July 24, 1862, the regiment reached Memphis, Tennessee, where they were based. On November 17, 1862, the regiment began an expedition to Vicksburg, Mississippi, and contributed in the campaign until Union Maj. Gen. Ulysses S. Grant was forced to abandon it on account of the capture of his materials at Holly Springs, Mississippi. On August 11, 1863, Colonel John M. Corse was promoted to brigadier general. The regiment was mustered out on July 21, 1865, in Louisville, Kentucky. Shortly after, the regiment was sent to Davenport, Iowa, where it was disbanded, and the men returned to their homes.

== Total strength and casualties ==
The unit strength in the 6th Iowa Infantry was 1102. The regiment lost 8 officers and 144 enlisted men who were killed in action or who died of their wounds and 2 officers and 126 enlisted men who died of disease, for a total of 280 fatalities. 353 people were wounded and 311 people died from wounds.

== Commanders ==
- Colonel John Adair McDowell
- Colonel John M. Corse

== See also ==
- List of Iowa Civil War units
- Iowa in the American Civil War
