= John V. Farwell & Co. =

Departmental store in Chicago, Illinois, United States

John V. Farwell & Co. was a department store in Chicago, Illinois, United States. The store's history traces back to 1836, when the Wadsworth brothers came to Chicago to sell goods. E. S. Wadsworth eventually formed a partnership with Thomas Dyer and John Putnam Chapin as Wadsworth, Dyer & Chapin. Following a series of ownership changes, the company fell under the executive control of John Villiers Farwell, for whom the company was renamed. A profitable clothing store, Philip Wadsworth & Co., was later spun off from the company. John V. Farwell & Co. was the most successful store in the city until the 1871 Great Chicago Fire. The store continued to operate after the fire, but faced stiff competition from former partners Marshall Field and Levi Leiter. It was purchased by Carson, Pirie & Co. in 1926.

== History ==
In 1836, E. S. Wadsworth came to Chicago, Illinois from New England to make land purchases and sell goods. His brother Julius soon followed. They soon formed a partnership with Thomas Dyer and opened a shop on Lake Street in a building owned by F. C. Sherman. The partnership later built their own store on South Water, between Clark and LaSalle Streets. The Wadsworths and Dyer then built a warehouse across the street from this second store to hold and sell grain. They also built a meatpacking house south of the Twelfth Street Bridge. As an investment, the Wadsworths built a store on the corner of Lake and Wabash Avenue.

In 1843, Julius Wadsworth left the company due to poor health. In his place, John Putnam Chapin joined the operation, which became known as Wadsworth, Dyer & Chapin. They built a new slaughterhouse on the South Branch of the Chicago River and arranged a deal to slaughter cattle raised by Jesse and Isaac Funk. Wadsworth focused on retail operations while Dyer and Chapin concentrated on the meatpacking interests. In 1846, Chapin was elected the 10th Mayor of Chicago. Wadsworth moved the company to a retail focus while Dyer left to start his own meatpacking operation. Before the firm split, Wadsworth, Dyer & Chapin became one of the thirteen entities to support the creation of the Chicago Board of Trade; Dyer was named its first president.

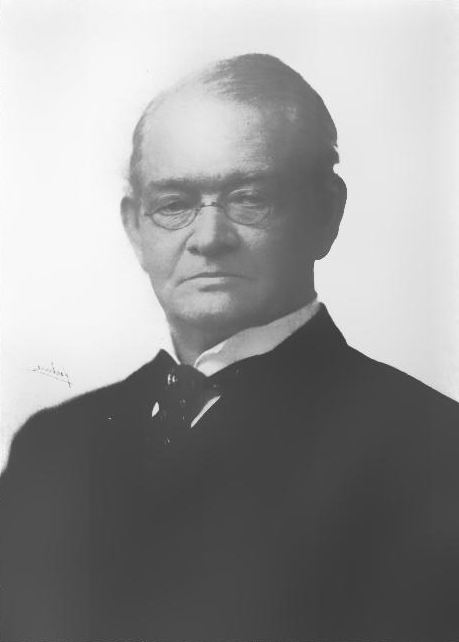
Longtime senior partner John Villiers Farwell

William Henry Phelps was admitted as partner and the firm became Wadsworth & Phelps. Shortly thereafter, they accepted a Mr. Cooley as a senior partner, becoming Cooley, Wadsworth & Phelps. Phelps left the company in 1850 and was replaced by John Villiers Farwell; the store was restyled Cooley, Wadsworth & Co. Wadsworth retired in 1863. In 1864, the company was restyled Farwell, Field & Co. after Marshall Field and Levi Leiter were admitted to the partnership. However, the next year, Field and Leiter left to join Potter Palmer in Field, Palmer, Leiter & Co. (later Marshall Field & Co.) The store continued as John V. Farwell & Co. with a partnership consisting of Farwell, Charles B. Farwell, William D. Farwell, John K. Harmon, and S. N. Kellogg. Kellogg retired in 1867 and Simeon Farwell was admitted as a partner in 1870.

John V. Farwell & Co. operated out of a building at 112-116 Wabash Avenue. Clothing operations were spun off into their own firm, first Huntington, Wadsworth & Parks and later the boot and shoe company C. M. Henderson & Co. In October 1871, the Great Chicago Fire destroyed the building and much of the surrounding area. A new building was then commissioned at the northwest corner of Monroe and Franklin Streets. In 1883, a new eight-story building at the corner of Market and Monroe Streets opened from the shop. Farwell left in the mid-1880s to invest in lands in Texas, namely the XIT Ranch. The company was sold to Carson, Pirie & Co. in 1926.
