= Samuel A. Irvin =

Collector of Internal Revenue for the First District of Illinois
- In office April 8, 1872 - 1874
- Appointed by: Ulysses S. Grant
- Preceded by: Hermann Raster
- Succeeded by: Philip Wadsworth

Personal details
- Born: January 17, 1833 Germany
- Died: February 3, 1918 (aged 85)
- Party: Republican
- Profession: Politician

Samuel A. Irvin (1833-1918) was the Collector of Internal Revenue for the 1st District of Illinois and served for several years as City Counsellor of the City of Chicago. During the term of Hermann Raster as Collector of Internal Revenue he served as his chief deputy. When Raster resigned due to political matters in late May 1872, President Ulysses S. Grant elected Irvin as his replacement on April 8.

Preceded by Hermann Raster	Collector of Internal Revenue for the 1st District of Illinois; April 8, 1872 - 1874	Succeeded by Philip Wadsworth
