= Philip Wadsworth =

American politician

Collector of Internal Revenue for the First District of Illinois
- In office 1874–1875
- Appointed by: Ulysses S. Grant
- Preceded by: Samuel A. Irvin
- Succeeded by: Joseph Dana Webster

Personal details
- Born: March 7, 1832 New Hartford, Connecticut, U.S.
- Died: September 12, 1901 (aged 69) Chicago, Illinois, U.S.
- Party: Republican
- Profession: Merchant, politician, soldier

Philip Wadsworth (March 7, 1832 – September 12, 1901) was an American dry goods merchant, politician, and military leader. Born to the prominent Wadsworth family in New Hartford, Connecticut, he attended private academies until he was sixteen, when he entered the dry goods trade. In 1853, he moved to Chicago, Illinois, to join his brother in his dry goods operation, eventually rising to become president of Philip Wadsworth & Co., a clothing store. Wadsworth was also interested in the military, and although he never officially served, he maintained a military company where soldiers could train in advance of the Civil War. Later in his life he returned to Connecticut, where he served a two-year term in the Connecticut House of Representatives.

== Biography ==
Philip Wadsworth was born on March 7, 1832, in New Hartford, Connecticut. The Wadsworths were a prominent family in Connecticut; his great uncle Jeremiah was a government official for the Continental Army and his father Tertius was a wealthy real estate developer. Philip Wadsworth was raised in New Hartford and attended public schools before studying at Williston Seminary and the Connecticut Baptist Literary Institute. After graduating at the age of sixteen, Wadsworth forwent further study at a college in favor of entering the dry goods business. He took a position in New York City, New York with Hopkins, Allen & Co., who specialized in importing European goods.

In 1853, Wadsworth's brother Elisha S. invited him to Chicago, Illinois, to join the dry goods house of Cooley, Wadsworth & Co. Wadsworth rose to become the president of the clothing supplier spun off from the company, and after his co-partners died, it became known as Philip Wadsworth & Co. The company had annual revenues exceeding one million dollars, including a woolen goods manufactury in Boston, Massachusetts.

He enjoyed reading about military matters and founded the Chicago Light Guard, a uniformed military company. When the Civil War broke out, most of the soldiers were able to join the active service in ranked positions. He maintained the company for one more year after the star of the war as a training service. Wadsworth was offered a regiment with the rank of colonel by Governor Richard Yates, but he declined, citing the need to maintain his business interests.

In 1862, President Abraham Lincoln appointed Wadsworth tax assessor for the First District of Illinois, although he only held the position for one year before resigning. He was later an alderman for Chicago. In 1867, Wadsworth was appointed a representative of the Cook County Board of Commissioners for the construction of the Illinois State Capitol building. He was elected the first president of the Chicago Club upon its founding in 1869. In 1874 he was appointed Collector of Internal Revenue of the 1st District of Illinois by President Grant, and held that post until his resignation the following year. Wadsworth returned to Connecticut later in his life. In 1895, he was elected as a Republican to the Connecticut House of Representatives, serving a two-year term.

Wadsworth married Georgiana H. Loomis in 1855. They had two children: Philip (died in infancy) and Emily. He died in Chicago on September 12, 1901, and was buried in Woodfield Cemetery in Suffield, Connecticut.

Preceded by Samuel A. Irvin	Collector of Internal Revenue for the 1st District of Illinois; 1874 - 1875	Succeeded by Joseph Dana Webster
