= F.H. Battershall =

American military officer (1840–1891)

Collector of Internal Revenue for the First District of Illinois
- Acting
- In office March 12, 1876 – March 31, 1876
- Preceded by: Joseph Dana Webster
- Succeeded by: Joel D. Harvey

Personal details
- Born: Francis H. Battershall; 1840 Schenectady, New York
- Died: January 19, 1891 (aged 50–51) Chicago, Illinois
- Party: Republican

Frank H. Battershall (1840 – January 19, 1891) was an American revenue agent and military officer in the Union Army during the Civil War. Upon the sudden death of his predecessor, Joseph Dana Webster, Battershall briefly held the office of Collector of Internal Revenue for the First District of Illinois until President Grant appointed Joel D. Harvey in his place. He died in Chicago in 1891.
