= Levi Leiter =

American businessman (1834–1904)

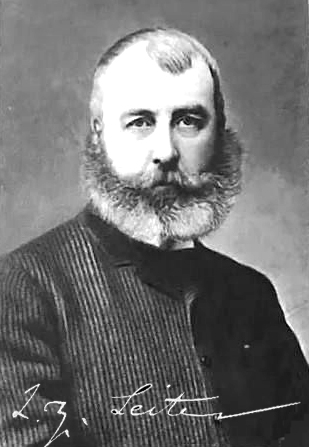
- Levi Leiter, 1894
- Born: Levi Ziegler Leiter; November 2, 1834; Leitersburg, Maryland, U.S.
- Died: June 6, 1904 (aged 69); Bar Harbor, Maine, U.S.
- Known for: Co-founder of Marshall Field & Company
- Spouse: Mary Theresa Carver (m. 1866)
- Children: Mary Curzon, Baroness Curzon of Kedleston; Margaret Howard, Countess of Suffolk

Signature
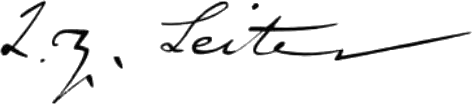

Levi Ziegler Leiter (November 2, 1834 – June 9, 1904) was an American businessman based in Chicago. He co-founded what later became the Marshall Field & Company retail empire.

== Early life ==
Leiter was born to Anne (née Ziegler) and Joseph Thomas Leiter, of Leitersburg, the Washington County, Maryland town founded by his granduncle Andrew Leiter. Although some have confused Leiter's ancestry as Jewish, his family was in fact of Swiss descent; he was raised a Lutheran.

== Career ==
As a boy, Leiter worked for a dry goods business in Springfield, Ohio. He first worked as a clerk in te village store and then became a peddler. In 1853 he began working as a bookkeeper at Chicago's then-largest dry goods company, Cooley, Wadsworth & Co., where he worked alongside Marshall Field and Potter Palmer. Leiter and Field became partners in the firm, but in 1865, they sold their interest in the company to John V. Farwell and went into business, along with Palmer, as Field, Palmer, Leiter & Co.

In 1867, Palmer left his business to pursue real estate ventures, and the company was renamed Field, Leiter & Co. Field & Leiter built a six-story store on State Street in 1868. It was rebuilt after the Great Chicago Fire in 1871. From 1874 to 1880, Leiter was a member of the Executive Committee of the Chicago Relief and Aid Society, which helped collect and distribute funds to rebuild Chicago after the fire. When Leiter sold his interest to Field and retired from the dry goods business in 1881, the name was changed to Marshall Field and Company.

As Leiter's wealth increased, he invested much of his savings in Chicago real estate. After retirement from Field, Leiter & Co., he devoted his attention to real estate and corporate interests. He later devoted time to travel and philanthropy. He was the first president of the Commercial Club of Chicago, the second president of the Chicago Art Institute, a president of the Chicago Historical Society, and a prominent figure in the Illinois Trust Company.

=== Joseph Leiter ===
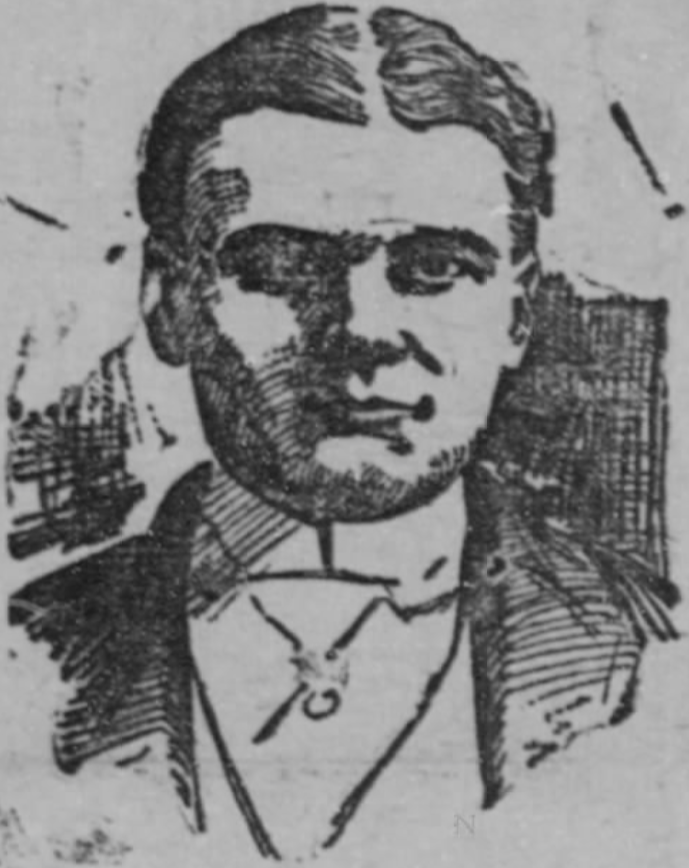
Sketch of Joseph Leiter

From 1892 to 1898, his son Joseph was his agent. Joseph attempted to corner the wheat market from 1897 to 1898, and was briefly the largest individual holder of wheat in the history of the grain trade. Concerted action by his competitors broke the corner. Levi paid millions of dollars to settle Joseph's debts after the market crashed in 1898. Levi's losses were reputed to run to $10 million. Joseph was later the founder of the company town of Zeigler, Illinois, and president of the Zeigler Coal Company and the Chicago, Zeigler and Gulf Railway Company; he was also a director of the American Security and Trust Company.

Zeigler Coal Company was established in 1903 and controlled by the Zeigler Coal Holding Company, which in 1998 was purchased by the Addington Brothers AEI Resources. The company produced steam-grade coal, which it primarily sold to electric utilities.

== Personal life ==
In 1866, Leiter married Mary Theresa Carver (1844–1913) of Chicago. From 1885 until her death, she served as the second Vice Regent for Illinois in the Mount Vernon Ladies' Association, which is occupied with the preservation of George Washington's Mount Vernon estate. Together, they were the parents of:

- Joseph Leiter (1868–1932), who married Juliette Williams (1887–1942).
- Mary Victoria Leiter (1870–1906), who married the British Conservative statesman George Nathaniel Curzon, Viceroy of India, later the 1st Baron Curzon of Kedleston and ultimately 1st Marquess Curzon of Kedleston; she was thus Vicereine of India between 1899 and 1905.
- Nancy Lathrop Carver Leiter (1873–1930), who married Colin Powys Campbell (1859–1923).
- Margaret Hyde Leiter (1880–1968), who married Henry Molineux Howard (1877–1917), the 19th Earl of Suffolk and 12th Earl of Berkshire.

Leiter died of heart disease at the Vanderbilt family cottage in Bar Harbor, Maine on June 9, 1904. His estate became the subject of eight years of litigation.

=== Washington residence ===
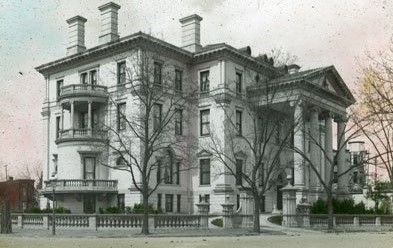
The Leiter House in Washington, D.C.

In 1891, Leiter commissioned the Leiter House, which was built adjacent to Dupont Circle in Washington, D.C., and was designed by Theophilus P. Chandler. After his death, his D.C. home was used for elaborate parties hosted by his widow. During WWII, the mansion was leased to the U.S. Government for office space. The property was sold and the structure was demolished in 1947. The site is now the location of the Dupont Hotel.

=== Descendants ===
Through his eldest daughter, he was the maternal grandfather of Lady Irene Curzon (later Baroness Ravensdale; 1896–1966); Lady Cynthia Curzon (1898–1933), the first wife of Sir Oswald Mosley; and Alexandra Curzon (1904–1995), the wife of Edward Dudley Metcalfe, the best friend, best man and equerry of King Edward VIII.

Through his daughter Margaret, he was the maternal grandfather of Charles Howard, 20th Earl of Suffolk (1906–1941); Hon. Cecil John Arthur Howard (1908–1985), married Frances Dean; and Lt.-Cdr. Hon. Greville Reginald Howard (1909–1987).
