= Sir Philip Grey Egerton, 12th Baronet =

British soldier and aristocrat (1864–1937)

Sir Philip Grey-Egerton, Bt JP DP

Personal details
- Born: 29 April 1864
- Died: 4 July 1937 (aged 73)
- Spouse(s): May Caroline Campbell Cuyler (m. 1893; div. 1905) Aimée Cumming Clarke (m. 1910)
- Relations: Sir Philip Grey Egerton, 10th Baronet (grandfather); Albert Denison, 1st Baron Londesborough (grandfather)
- Children: 3
- Parent(s): Sir Philip Grey-Egerton, 11th Baronet; Hon. Henrietta Denison

Sir Philip Henry Brian Grey-Egerton, 12th Baronet JP DP (29 April 1864 – 4 July 1937) was a British soldier and aristocrat who was a member of the Grey and Egerton families.

== Early life ==
Philip Henry Brian Grey-Egerton was born on 29 April 1864. He was the only son of Sir Philip le Belward Grey-Egerton, 11th Baronet (1833–1891) and Hon. Henrietta Elizabeth Sophia Denison (1836–1924), who married in July 1861. His only sibling was sister Violet Edith Grey-Egerton, who married John Gaspard Le Marchant Romilly, 3rd Baron Romilly in 1897.

His paternal grandparents were Sir Philip Grey Egerton, 10th Baronet and the former Anna Elizabeth Legh. His grandfather was a Member of Parliament for Chester, South Cheshire, and West Cheshire. His aunt, Cecily Louisa Grey-Egerton was married to Dunbar Douglas, 6th Earl of Selkirk. His mother was the eldest daughter of Albert Denison, 1st Baron Londesborough and Hon. Henrietta Maria Forester (fourth daughter of Cecil Weld-Forester, 1st Baron Forester).

== Career ==
He served as a Captain with the 4th Battalion Cheshire Regiment (which served in South Africa from 1901 to 1902), and Brevet Lieutenant-Colonel in the Territorial Force Reserve, formerly Earl of Chester's Yeomanry.

Upon his father's death on 2 September 1891, he became the 12th Baronet Grey Egerton baronet of Egerton and Oulton.

== Personal life ==
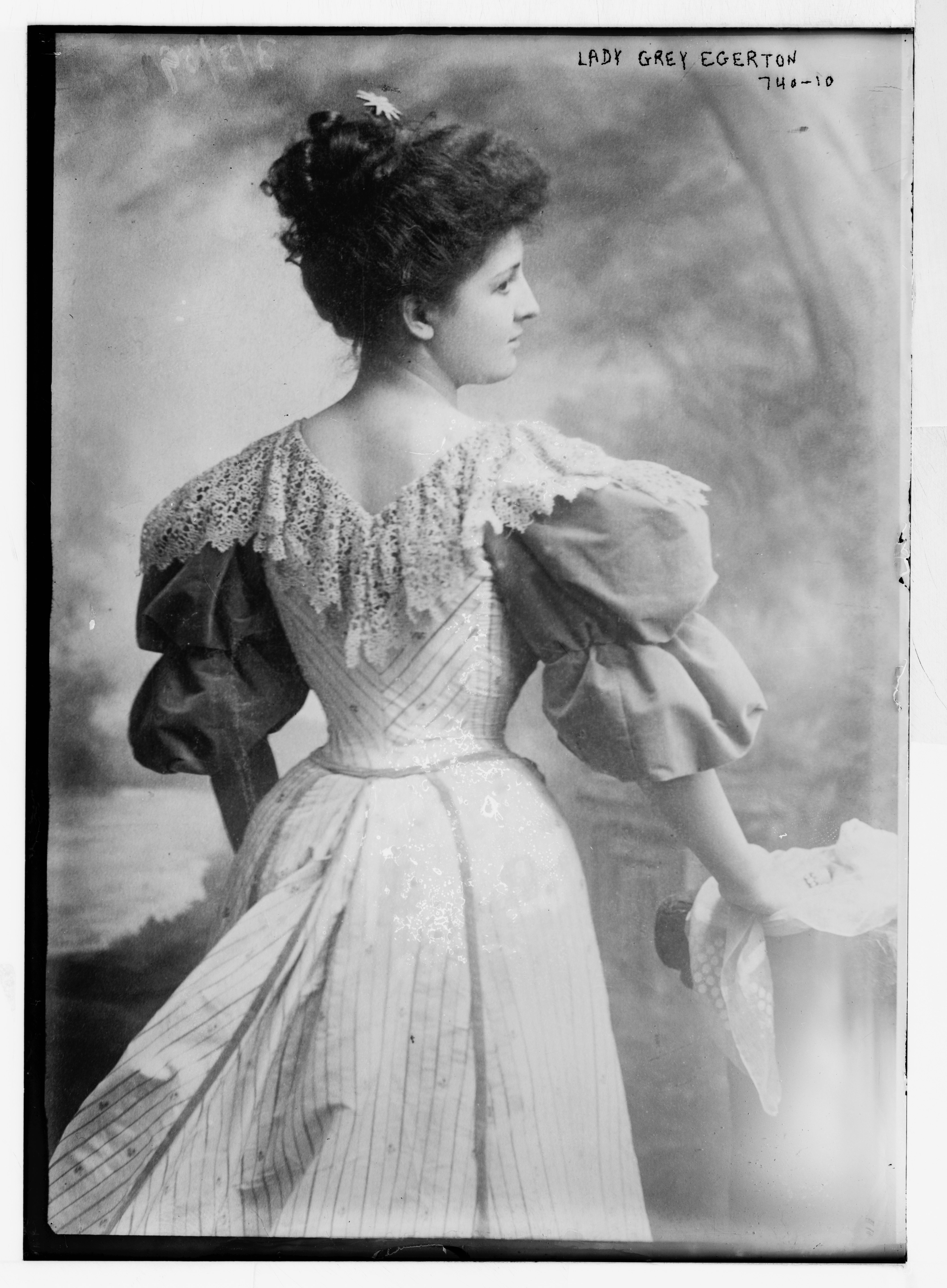
Photograph of his first wife, Lady Grey Egerton, Library of Congress

On 4 January 1893, he was married to Mary "May" Caroline Campbell Cuyler (d. 25 November 1958) in London. Their engagement had been announced in The New York Times on October 29, 1893. May was a daughter of Alice (née Holden) Cuyler and Maj. James Wayne Cuyler of Baltimore, Maryland, and a great-granddaughter of Associate Justice of the Supreme Court of the United States James Moore Wayne. Before their divorce in May 1905, they were the parents of twin sons and a daughter:

- Philip de Malpas Wayne Grey-Egerton (1895–1918), a Captain in the 19th Royal Hussars who was killed in action at Brancoucourt Farm.
- Rowland le Belward Grey-Egerton (1895–1914), a Second Lieutenant in the Royal Welsh Fusiliers who was also killed in action.
- Cecily Alice Grey Grey-Egerton MBE (d. 1981), who married Lt. Col. Denys Edward Prideaux-Brune DSO (d. 4 Jun 1952), second son of Hon. Katharine Hugessen (daughter of Edward Knatchbull-Hugessen, 1st Baron Brabourne) and Col. Charles Robert Prideaux-Brune of Prideaux Place, on 30 July 1918.

After his divorce from his first wife, she married Richard McCreery in 1907, and he remarried to Aimée Mary (née Cumming) Clarke on 26 April 1910. Aimée, the former wife of Sir Rupert Clarke, 2nd Baronet (they divorced in 1909), was a daughter of Hon. Thomas Forrest Cumming, an Australian sheep breeder and Legislative Council for Western Province.

Sir Philip died on 4 July 1937. As he was predeceased by both of his sons, he was succeeded in the baronetcy by the Rev. Sir Brooke de Malpas Egerton (later Grey-Egerton), his first cousin once removed, who was himself succeeded by Sir Philip Reginald le Belward Grey Egerton, 14th Baronet, his first cousin once removed. His widow, Lady Grey-Egerton died on 25 November 1958.

=== Descendants ===
Through his daughter Cecily, he was a grandfather to three grandchildren: Cynthia Mary Denise Prideaux-Brune (b. 1919), Philip Egerton Edmund Prideaux-Brune (b. 1921), and Rowland Denys Charles Prideaux-Brune (1925–2008).

Baronetage of England
Preceded by Philip Grey Egerton	Baronet (of Egerton and Oulton); 1891–1937	Succeeded by Brooke Grey Egerton
