= John M. Corse =

Union Army General (1835–1893)

John Murray Corse
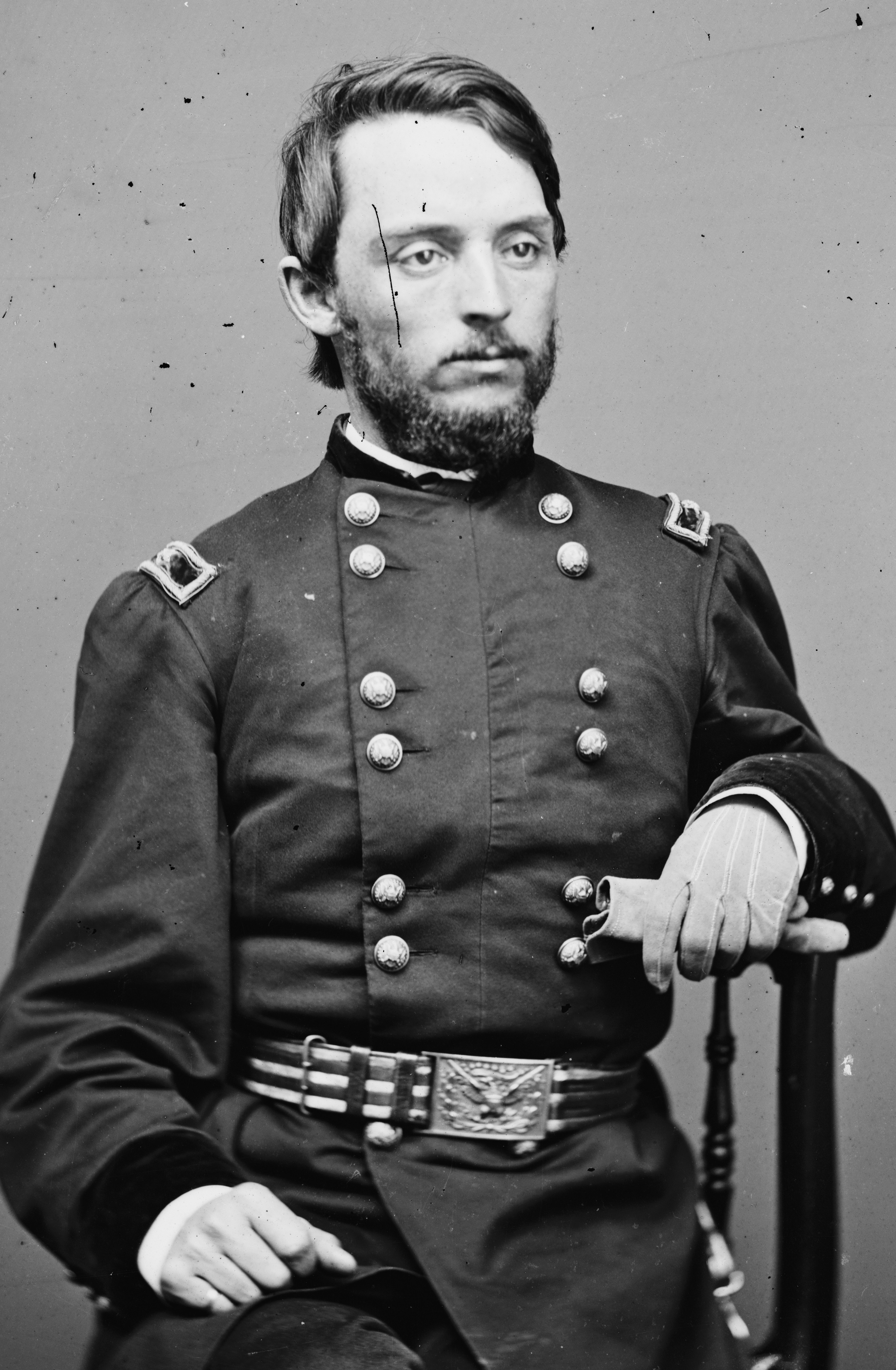

Collector of Internal Revenue for the First District of Illinois
- In office June 18, 1868 – April 19, 1869
- Appointed by: Andrew Johnson
- Preceded by: Orrin L. Mann
- Succeeded by: Edmund Jüssen

Personal details
- Born: April 27, 1835 Pittsburgh, Pennsylvania, U.S.
- Died: April 27, 1893 (aged 58) Winchester, Massachusetts, U.S.
- Resting place: Aspen Grove Cemetery; Burlington, Iowa

Military service
- Allegiance: United States of America; Union
- Branch/service: United States Army; Union Army
- Years of service: 1861–1866
- Rank: Brigadier General; Brevet Major General
- Commands: 6th Iowa Volunteer Infantry
- Battles/wars: American Civil War

John Murray Corse (April 27, 1835 – April 27, 1893) was an American politician and soldier who served as a general in the Union Army in the American Civil War. He was a staff officer during the liberation of the Upper Mississippi, and then served in the front line at Corinth and Vicksburg, being promoted to brigadier general. He is chiefly remembered for his stubborn defense of the Allatoona Pass in October 1864 against superior numbers, despite being seriously wounded, while Maj. Gen. William T. Sherman signalled a message which was turned into a popular ballad Hold the fort, for I am coming.

== Early life and career ==
Corse was born in Pittsburgh, Pennsylvania, but moved at the age of seven with his family to Burlington in the Iowa Territory. His father, John Lockwood Corse, served six terms as the mayor of that town and established a prosperous book and stationery business. Young Corse became a partner in the family business.

He was appointed to the United States Military Academy and studied there for two years. Leaving West Point in 1855, Corse chose not to stay in the military, but instead attended a law school in Albany, New York, and passed his bar exam. He later returned to Iowa and was nominated as the new state's lieutenant governor by the Iowa Democratic Party. In 1860, he unsuccessfully ran for secretary of state.

== Civil War ==
Corse joined the 6th Iowa Infantry as its Major in July 1861 and initially served under Maj. Gen. John C. Fremont. He then served on the staff of Maj. Gen. John Pope early the following year during the Battle of Island Number Ten and associated engagements. He returned to field duty with his regiment and fought in the Siege of Corinth, being promoted to lieutenant colonel. He was promoted to brigadier general of volunteers on August 11, 1863, in recognition of his service at the Siege of Vicksburg. Assigned command of the 4th Brigade, 4th Division, XV Corps, in the Federal Army of the Tennessee, Corse participated in the Chattanooga campaign. After recuperating from an injury suffered at Missionary Ridge, Corse returned to active duty as the inspector general on Maj. Gen. William Tecumseh Sherman's staff. In July 1864, he returned to field duty in command of a division in XVI Corps.

I am short a cheek-bone and an ear, but am able to whip all hell yet.

— John M. Corse made this peculiar boast after sustaining a head wound at the Battle of Allatoona in 1864

General Corse is best known for his role in the Battle of Allatoona in October 1864. On Sherman's orders, Corse went with 2,100 men to secure Allatoona Pass to prevent Confederate Gen. John Bell Hood from severing Union communications. The small band of Union soldiers fought determinedly against the 7,000 troops under Major General Samuel G. French. During the bloody battle, Corse "lost one third of his men and one third of his ear" but secured the pass on October 5, the date on which he was later appointed a brevet major general. In the midst of the fighting, General Corse received the famous message from General Sherman, "Hold on, I am coming!" Newspapers later amended the text to "Hold the fort, for I am coming", which inspired a popular ballad. Corse was badly wounded during the stubborn defense, losing a cheekbone and one ear, but recovered to resume his front-line combat duties.

Corse later participated in Sherman's March to the Sea and the Siege of Savannah. In the final months of the Civil War, he led his division during the Carolinas campaign. At the end of the war he was appointed brevet major general for his Allatoona service.

== Postbellum career ==
Following the Civil War, Corse served in a variety of posts. He refused the offer of a commission as a lieutenant colonel in the regular army and instead mustered out of the volunteer service in April 1866. He soon returned to Iowa, where he built railroads and bridges. With the political patronage system of the period, he was named the regional Collector of Internal Revenue, with his office in Chicago. Corse later moved to Massachusetts and was chairman of the state's Democratic committee. He was then appointed Postmaster of Boston. He was married to the grandniece of former U.S. President Franklin Pierce.

Corse died on his 58th birthday in Winchester, Massachusetts. His body was transported to Burlington, Iowa, and interred in Aspen Grove Cemetery, the large red brick, and limestone mausoleum is plainly visible from the rear entrance of the cemetery, and is one of the cemetery's landmarks.

A bronze equestrian statue of General Corse by sculptor Carl Rohl-Smith stands in Crapo Park in Burlington; the statue was restored in 2006 at a cost of $100,000.

An elementary school within the Burlington School District bears both his, and his father's, names.

A bridge over the Iowa River on U.S. Highway 6 in Iowa City, Iowa has been named the John Corse Memorial Bridge.

== See also ==
- List of American Civil War generals (Union)

== Notes ==
Preceded by Orrin L. Mann	Collector of Internal Revenue for the 1st District of Illinois; 1868-1869	Succeeded by Edmund Jüssen
