= E. S. Wadsworth =

Elisha Strong Wadsworth (May 10, 1813 – November 25, 1890) was a merchant from New Hartford, Connecticut. He co-founded the Wadsworth, Dyer & Chapin company in Chicago, Illinois, with his brother Julius and Thomas Dyer. The operation was one of the first successful firms in Chicago, trading in dry goods, grain, and packaged meat. Wadsworth was also the president of the Chicago and Aurora Railroad, later serving on the board of directors of the Galena and Chicago Union Railroad when the two lines were merged. Wadsworth also served as a director of a predecessor to the Chicago, Milwaukee, St. Paul and Pacific Railroad. Wadsworth is the namesake of Wadsworth, Illinois.

== Biography ==
Elisha Strong Wadsworth was born in New Hartford, Connecticut, on May 10, 1813. The Wadsworths were a prominent family in Connecticut; his great uncle Jeremiah was a government official for the Continental Army and his father Tertius was a wealthy real estate developer. Early in his adulthood, E. S. Wadsworth opened a store in Charleston, South Carolina, with his brother Julius.

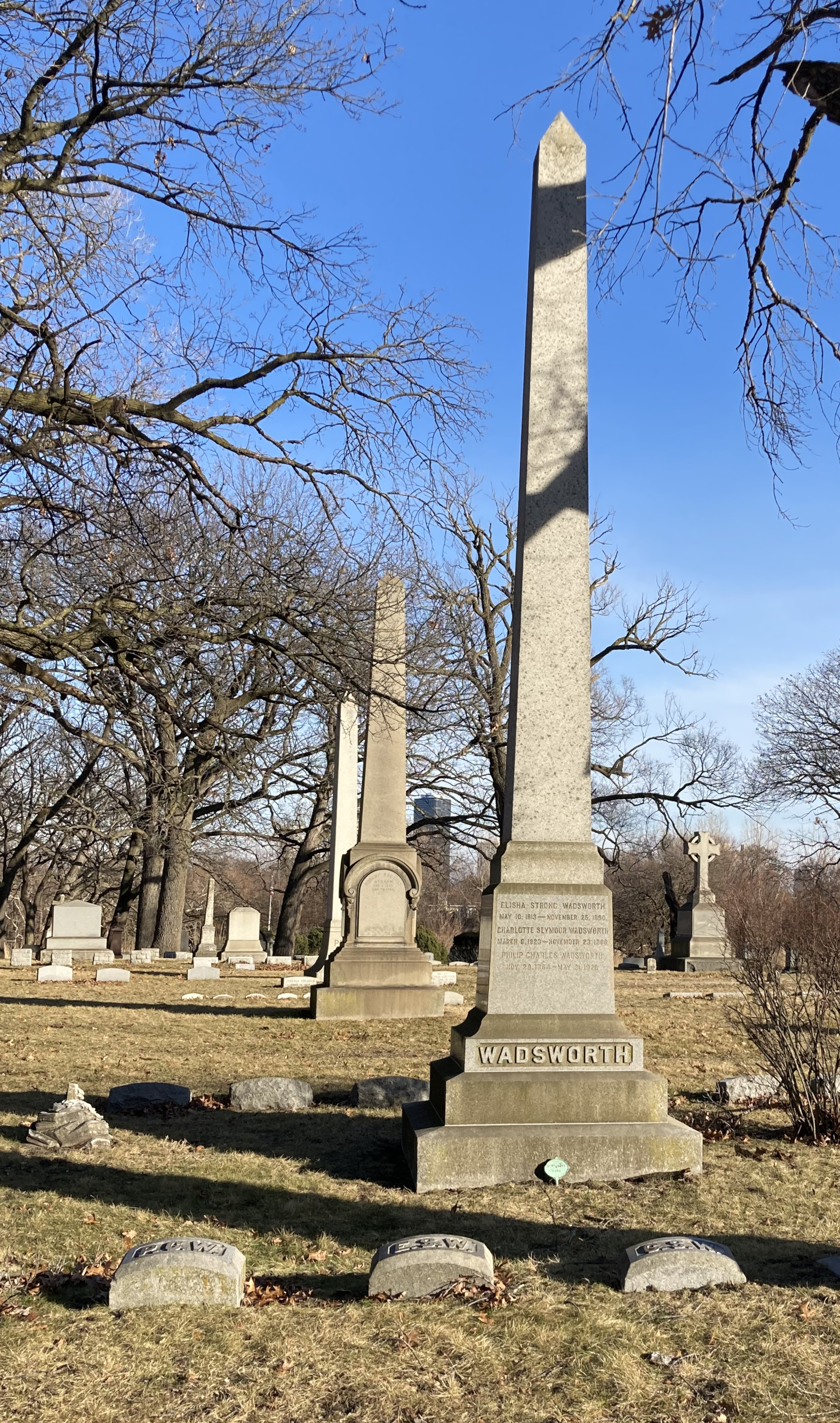
Wadsworth's grave at Rosehill Cemetery

In the spring of 1836, E. S. decided to move west to the new city of Chicago, Illinois, to sell his goods. His brother followed, and the two purchased several land holdings that June. They formed a business partnership with Thomas Dyer, opening a store on Lake Street in the F. C. Sherman building. The Wadsworths and Dyer built their own buildings and warehouse on South Water Street, between Clark and La Salle. They built a meatpacking house south of the Twelfth Street Bridge and marble-fronted stores on Lake and Wabash's corner. Julius Wadsworth fell ill and retired from the partnership to recover in Europe. He was replaced in the business with John Putnam Chapin. Wadsworth, Dyer & Chapin became one of Chicago's leading businesses, selling dry goods, storing and trading grain, managing real estate, and packing beef and pork.

Wadsworth was one of the first directors of the Galena and Chicago Union Railroad, following the merge with the Chicago and Aurora Railroad. He advocated for a railroad between Chicago and Milwaukee, Wisconsin, and later became a director what would become the Chicago, Milwaukee, St. Paul and Pacific Railroad. The town of Wadsworth, Illinois, through which the railroad traversed, was named in his honor. He largely retired in 1863 and afterward tended to his real estate interests.

E. S. Wadsworth married Charlotte S. Woodbridge in August 1842. They had four sons and one daughter. Eldest son Elisha Lyle served in the Chicago Mercantile Independent Battery Light Artillery and was later named an advisor to major general Godfrey Weitzel. However, he died in 1867 after contracting dengue fever. E. S. Wadsworth refused to seek public office. He died on November 25, 1890, and was buried in Rosehill Cemetery in Chicago.

== See also ==
- Philip Wadsworth, younger brother who worked alongside E. S.
