= SS James M. Wayne =

World War II Liberty ship of the United States

History

United States
- Name: James M. Wayne
- Namesake: James M. Wayne
- Owner: War Shipping Administration (WSA)
- Operator: Waterman Steamship Company
- Ordered: as type (EC2-S-C1) hull, MC hull 1489
- Builder: J.A. Jones Construction, Brunswick, Georgia
- Cost: $3,169,686
- Yard number: 105
- Way number: 1
- Laid down: 6 July 1942
- Launched: 13 March 1943
- Completed: 7 May 1943
- Identification: Call Signal: KHQB
- Fate: Laid up in National Defense Reserve Fleet, Wilmington, North Carolina, 24 April 1948; Sold for scrapping, 21 February 1967

General characteristics
- Class & type: Liberty ship; type EC2-S-C1, standard
- Tonnage: 10,865 LT DWT; 7,176 GRT
- Displacement: 3,380 long tons (3,434 t) (light); 14,245 long tons (14,474 t) (max)
- Length: 441 feet 6 inches (135 m) oa; 416 feet (127 m) pp; 427 feet (130 m) lwl
- Beam: 57 feet (17 m)
- Draft: 27 ft 9.25 in (8.4646 m)
- Installed power: 2 × Oil fired 450 °F (232 °C) boilers, operating at 220 psi (1,500 kPa); 2,500 hp (1,900 kW)
- Propulsion: 1 × triple-expansion steam engine, (manufactured by General Machinery Corp., Hamilton, Ohio); 1 × screw propeller
- Speed: 11.5 knots (21.3 km/h; 13.2 mph)
- Capacity: 562,608 cubic feet (15,931 m^{3}) (grain); 499,573 cubic feet (14,146 m^{3}) (bale)
- Complement: 38–62 USMM; 21–40 USNAG
- Armament: Varied by ship; Bow-mounted 3-inch (76 mm)/50-caliber gun; Stern-mounted 4-inch (102 mm)/50-caliber gun; 2–8 × single 20-millimeter (0.79 in) Oerlikon anti-aircraft (AA) cannons and/or, 2–8 × 37-millimeter (1.46 in) M1 AA guns

SS James M. Wayne was a Liberty ship built in the United States during World War II. She was named after James M. Wayne, an Associate Justice of the Supreme Court of the United States and a United States representative from Georgia.

== Construction ==
James M. Wayne was laid down on 6 July 1942, under a United States Maritime Commission (MARCOM) contract, MC hull 1489, by J.A. Jones Construction, Brunswick, Georgia, and launched on 13 March 1943.

== History ==
She was allocated to the Waterman Steamship Company on 7 May 1943. On 19 September 1944, she collided with the Liberty ship Christopher S. Flanagan near Cardiff, Wales. She was repaired in Cardiff, and left on 30 September 1944. On 24 April 1948, she was laid up in the National Defense Reserve Fleet in Wilmington, North Carolina. On 21 February 1967, she was sold to Union Minerals & Alloys for $48,259, and scrapped.

== Bibliography ==
- "Jones Construction, Brunswick GA". ShipbuildingHistory.com. 13 October 2010.
- "Liberty Ships – World War II".
- Maritime Administration. "JAMES M. WAYNE". Ship History Database Vessel Status Card. U.S. Department of Transportation, Maritime Administration. Archived from the original on 12 December 2019.
- Davies, James (May 2004). "Specifications (As-Built)" (PDF). p. 23.
- "SS James M. Wayne".
