= Henry C. Wayne =

U.S. Army (and later Confederate Army) officer

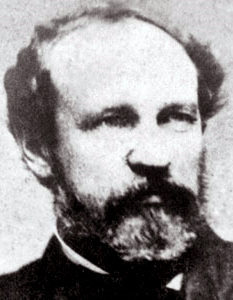
- Henry C. Wayne, Confederate Brigadier General, Adjutant and Inspector-General in the Confederate Service
- Born: September 18, 1815; Savannah, Georgia, U.S.
- Died: March 15, 1883 (aged 67); Savannah, Georgia, U.S.
- Burial place: Laurel Grove Cemetery
- Relatives: James M. Wayne (father)
- Military career
- Allegiance: United States of America; Confederate States of America
- Branch: United States Army; Confederate States Army
- Service years: 1838–1860 (USA); 1861–1865 (CSA)
- Rank: Brevet Major (USA); Brigadier General (CSA)
- Conflicts: Aroostook War; Mexican-American War: Battle of Contreras; Battle of Churubusco; American Civil War

Henry Constantine Wayne (September 18, 1815 – March 15, 1883) was a United States Army officer, and is known for his commanding the expedition to test the U.S. Camel Corps as part of Secretary of War Jefferson Davis's plan to use camels as a transport in the West. Wayne was also a Confederate adjutant and inspector-general for Georgia and a brigadier general during the American Civil War.

== Early life and career ==
Henry C. Wayne was born on September 18, 1815, in Savannah, Georgia, the son of U.S. Supreme Court Justice James Moore Wayne. He graduated from West Point in 1838 and joined the artillery as a second lieutenant. Later in that year Wayne participated in the Aroostook War over the boundary of Maine.

In 1841, he became the assistant instructor of artillery and cavalry at West Point . Henry became a first lieutenant in 1842. From 1843 to 1846 he was the first military member to serve as Master of the Sword at the academy.

When the United States declared war on Mexico, Wayne joined the troops to fight. He was brevetted a major for his bravery at the Battles of Contreras and Churubusco.

== U.S. Camel Corps ==
After the Mexican-American War, Henry Wayne befriended George H. Crosman. Crossman brought up his idea of using camels for transportation of people and supplies in the newly conquered American Southwest. Wayne relayed this idea to Senator Jefferson Davis; and when Davis became Secretary of War on 1853, he urged Congress to pass a bill to experiment with the camels. Wayne was chosen to lead an expedition to the Middle East to purchase $30,000 worth of camels. The group sailed to London on the USS Supply to examine camels in zoos. They then journeyed to Italy and met Grand Duke Leopold II to see his 250 camels that were said to be able to do the work of 1000 horses. They then purchased thirty-three camels: three in Tunisia, nine in Egypt, and twenty-one in Turkey. When the group arrived back, they experimented with the animals in the deserts of the western United States. Forty-one more camels would arrive later to join the corps. Congress, on the request of the Department of War, proposed a bill to buy 1,000 more camels, but the start of the Civil War quickly ended the debate . The experiments were also ended with the start of the Civil War, and the remaining camels were either sold or released into the wild.

== Civil War ==
Wayne resigned his commission after receiving the results of Abraham Lincoln's victory in the presidential election. He joined the Confederate Army and was appointed the adjutant and inspector-general of Georgia by Governor Joseph E. Brown, where he was responsible for putting the army of Georgia into order in companies, regiments, and brigades. He also commanded Georgia's Quartermaster General, Ira Roe Foster, to immediately provide supplies for the troops, instructing Foster to "proceed personally, or by duly accredited agents, into all parts of the state, and buy 25,000 suits of clothes and 25,000 pairs of shoes for the destitute Ga. troops in the Confederate service." On December 16, 1861, Wayne was commissioned a brigadier general. Through his orders, the men of Georgia guarded the crossings of Chattahoochee River. After being ordered to Manassas, Virginia, Wayne resigned his commission as a brigadier general and he instead just stuck to his duties as adjutant and inspector-general until the end of the war. Although, he did briefly see action during the Savannah Campaign (Sherman's March to the Sea). He commanded Confederate troops at the Battle of Ball's Ferry November 23–26, 1864. In this action, he was unsuccessful in stopping Union forces from crossing the Oconee River in Wilkinson County, GA.

== Personal life ==
Wayne died at his home on March 16, 1883. He was buried in Laurel Grove Cemetery in Savannah.

== Awards and books ==
Wayne received the First Class Gold Medal of Mammal Division by the Société impériale zoologique d'acclimatation of France in 1858 for his introduction of the camel into the United States. That same year, he was elected to the American Philosophical Society. In 1856 he wrote The Sword Exercise, arranged for Military Instruction.

== See also ==
- List of American Civil War generals (Confederate)
- Ira Roe Foster
