= Edmund Jüssen =

German-American politician and diplomat

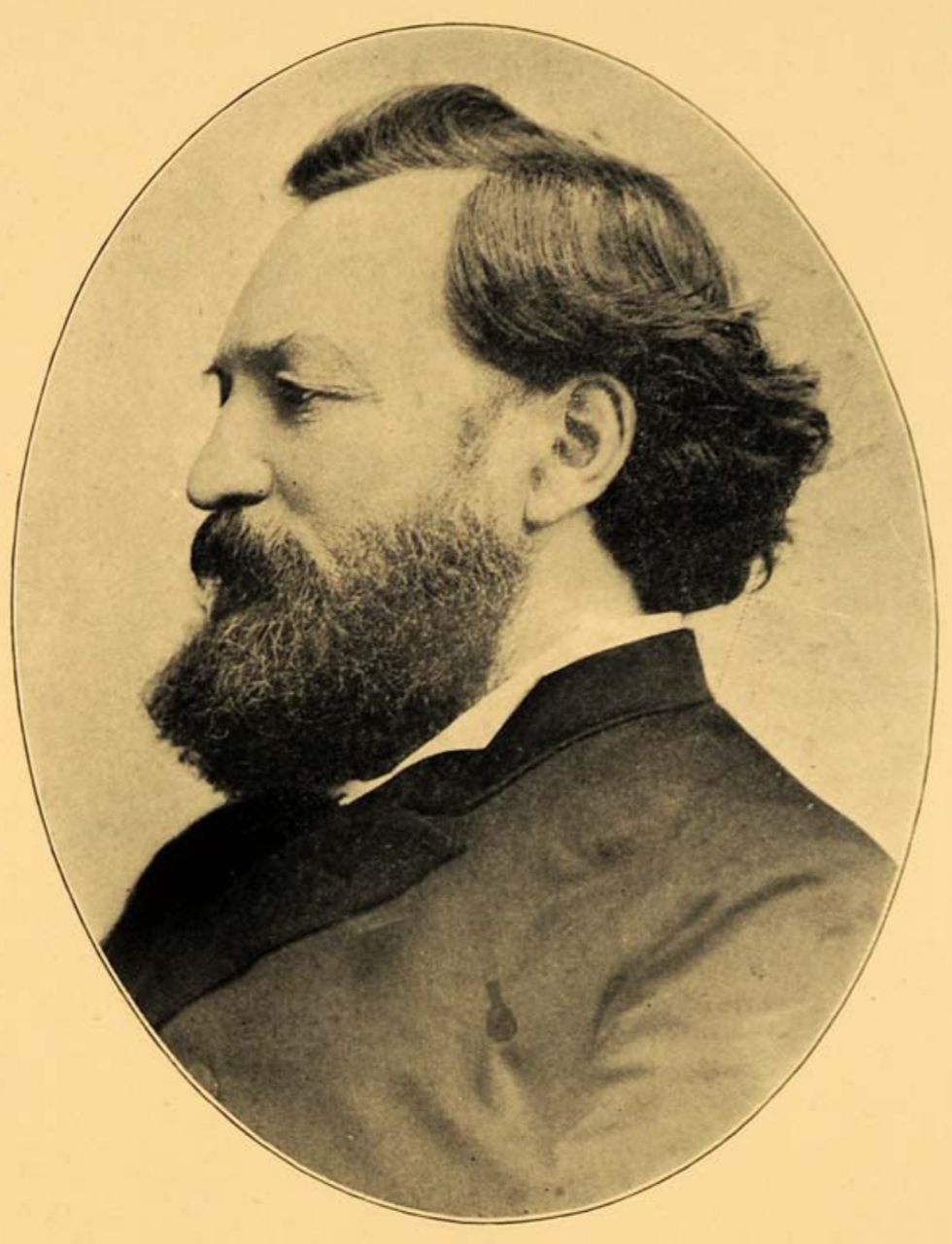

United States Consul General in Vienna
- In office 1885–1891
- Appointed by: Grover Cleveland

Collector of Internal Revenue for the First District of Illinois
- In office April 19, 1869 – December 1869
- Appointed by: Ulysses S. Grant
- Preceded by: John M. Corse
- Succeeded by: Hermann Raster

Member of the Wisconsin State Assembly from the Dane 5th district
- In office January 1, 1862 – January 1, 1863
- Preceded by: Dominick O'Malley
- Succeeded by: George Hyer

Personal details
- Born: 1830 Jülich, Kingdom of Prussia
- Died: February 17, 1891 (aged 60–61) Frankfurt, Germany
- Party: Republican
- Parent: Jacob Jüssen (father)
- Profession: Politician

Military service
- Allegiance: United States
- Branch/service: United States Army; Union Army
- Rank: Colonel, USV
- Commands: 23rd Reg. Wis. Vol. Infantry
- Battles/wars: American Civil War

Edmund Jüssen (1830 – February 17, 1891) was a German-American politician and diplomat who held office in the states of Wisconsin and Illinois. He spent the final years of his career as the United States Consul General in Vienna.

== Biography ==
=== Early life ===
Jüssen was born in Jülich, in the Kingdom of Prussia to Jacob Jüssen (1802–1880), a wealthy cloth merchant who served as Burgermeister of Jülich. Swept up in the 1848 Revolutions, Jüssen's opportunities for education in Germany were limited due to his political affiliations, and he elected to instead travel to the United States with his uncle, Georg. Jüssen's brother-in-law Carl Schurz also immigrated to America and in 1877 became United States Secretary of the Interior.

=== Career ===
Edmund Jüssen came to the Wisconsin Territory from Germany in 1847 and first found employment with the Hungarian nobleman Agoston Haraszthy, who helped the young man learn English through the use of his extensive library. Jüssen opened a store in Columbus soon thereafter. He then moved to Saint Louis, Missouri but returned to Columbus with his wife who succumbed to cholera shortly thereafter. He studied law and was admitted to the Wisconsin bar. In 1853, Jüssen's father joined him in Wisconsin and eventually served as postmaster of Columbus.

In an effort to establish himself in a larger community, Jüssen moved to Madison, where he was elected to the Wisconsin State Assembly in 1861 as a Republican. He served in the 23rd Wisconsin Volunteer Infantry Regiment with the rank of Lieutenant-Colonel in the American Civil War. Jüssen was well respected by his soldiers, and he was a strict disciplinarian that did not allow straggling or looting. He was wounded and returned home in 1863, though spent the remainder of his life suffering from chronic pain. After the war he practiced law in Chicago, Illinois.

In 1869, Jüssen was appointed Collector of Internal Revenue for the First District of Illinois and it was during his tenure in this office that he discovered the earliest activities of the Whiskey Ring, prior to the outbreak of the scandal. Unable to bribe him into ceasing his investigations, whiskey distillers managed to secure his removal from office by the end of the year. Shortly thereafter, for health reasons, Jüssen and his family traveled to Germany. Whilst there, he was a correspondent for several American newspapers. He returned to the United States and resumed practicing law after a year and a half absence.

He was appointed United States Consul General in Vienna, Austria-Hungary, in 1885 by President Grover Cleveland. He would not again see America in his lifetime and died in Frankfurt while returning to the United States. He was buried at Rosehill Cemetery in Chicago.

Preceded by John M. Corse	Collector of Internal Revenue for the First District of Illinois; 1869	Succeeded by Hermann Raster
