= Henry Howard, 19th Earl of Suffolk =

British peer (1877–1917)

The Right Honourable The Earl of Suffolk
- Preceded by: Henry Howard, 18th Earl of Suffolk
- Succeeded by: Charles Howard, 20th Earl of Suffolk

Personal details
- Born: Henry Molyneux Paget Howard; 13 September 1877
- Died: 21 April 1917 (aged 39)
- Spouse: Margaret Hyde Leiter (m. 1904)
- Children: Charles Howard, 20th Earl of Suffolk; Cecil John Arthur Howard; Greville Reginald Howard
- Parent(s): Henry Howard, 18th Earl of Suffolk; Mary Eleanor Lauderdale Coventry
- Relatives: See Howard family
- Education: Sandroyd School and Winchester College

Henry Molyneux Paget Howard, 19th Earl of Suffolk, 12th Earl of Berkshire (13 September 1877 – 21 April 1917) was a British peer, styled Viscount Andover until 1898.

== Early life ==
The eldest son of Henry Howard, 18th Earl of Suffolk and Mary Eleanor Lauderdale Coventry (1847–1928). His siblings were Hon. James Knyvett Estcourt Howard, Lady Mary Howard, Lady Eleanor Howard, Lady Agnes Howard, and Lady Katharine Howard.

His paternal grandparents were Charles Howard, 17th Earl of Suffolk and his wife, Isabella Howard (daughter of Lord Henry Howard, and niece of Bernard Howard, 12th Duke of Norfolk). His maternal grandparents were Capt. Hon. Henry Amelius Coventry (son of George Coventry, 8th Earl of Coventry and Lady Mary Beauclerk, the only daughter of Aubrey Beauclerk, 6th Duke of St Albans) and the former Caroline Stirling Dundas (second daughter of James Dundas, 28th of Dundas Castle and Hon. Mary Tufton Duncan, a daughter of Adam Duncan, 1st Viscount Duncan).

He was educated at Sandroyd School and Winchester College.

He was an active freemason, and member of several lodges.

== Career ==
He was commissioned a second lieutenant in the 4th Battalion, Gloucestershire Regiment (The Royal North Gloucestershire Militia) on 12 February 1896 and was promoted lieutenant on 2 February 1897. He succeeded his father as Earl of Suffolk in March 1898. On 16 December 1898, he was seconded as an extra aide-de-camp to George Curzon, 1st Marquess Curzon of Kedleston, Viceroy of India, and was promoted captain while serving as ADC on 11 April 1900.

He resigned his commission on 28 January 1907. On 9 June 1908, he was commissioned as a major, commanding the Wiltshire Battery, 3rd Wessex Brigade, Royal Field Artillery This Territorial unit was sent to India at the beginning of World War I and subsequently provided drafts to units fighting in the Mesopotamian campaign.On 21 April 1917, at the Battle of Istabulat, Suffolk was killed by shrapnel through the heart while commanding a battery. He is buried at Basra War Cemetery, Iraq.

== Personal life ==
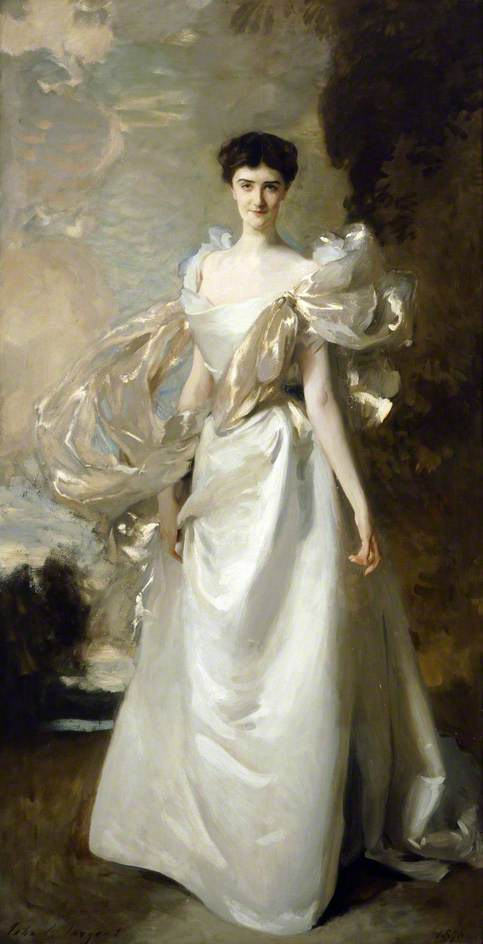
Margaret Hyde "Daisy" Leiter

On 26 December 1904, Suffolk married the American heiress Margaret Hyde "Daisy" Leiter (1880–1968), the second daughter and youngest child of Levi Zeigler Leiter of Dupont Circle, Washington, D.C. Daisy was the sister of Mary Curzon, Baroness Curzon of Kedleston and sister-in-law of Lord Curzon, by whom he had three children:

- Charles Howard, 20th Earl of Suffolk (1906–1941), who married Chicago-born English ballet dancer, Mimi Forde-Piggott, known as "Mimi Crawford", daughter of Alfred George Forde-Piggott.
- Hon. Cecil John Arthur Howard (1908–1985), who married Frances Drake Dean, daughter of Edwin Morgan Dean, without issue.
- Lt. Cdr. Hon. Greville Reginald Howard (1909–1987), who married Mary Ridehalgh, daughter of William Smith Ridehalgh of Broughton Lodge.

Lord Suffolk was succeeded by his son Charles Howard, 20th Earl of Suffolk. His widow survived him by over fifty years until her death on 5 March 1968. She died at Antelope Valley Hospital in Lancaster, California.

Peerage of England
Preceded by Henry Charles Howard	Earl of Suffolk; 1898–1917	Succeeded by Charles Henry George Howard
Preceded by Henry Charles Howard	Earl of Berkshire; 1898–1917	Succeeded by Charles Henry George Howard
