= John M. Cuyler =

American Civil War general (1810–1884)

John Meck Cuyler
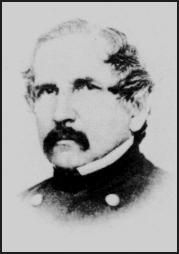
- Born: March 9, 1810; Savannah, Georgia, U.S.
- Died: April 26, 1884 (aged 74); Morristown, New Jersey, U.S.
- Burial place: Laurel Grove Cemetery, Savannah, Georgia
- Spouse: Mary Campbell Wayne (m. 1840–1884)
- Military career
- Allegiance: United States (Union)
- Branch: United States Army (Union Army)
- Service years: 1834–1882
- Rank: Colonel; Bvt. Brigadier General
- Conflicts: Creek War of 1836; Second Seminole War; Mexican–American War; American Civil War; Gettysburg campaign; Battle of Gettysburg

John Meck Cuyler, M.D. (March 9, 1810 – April 26, 1884) was an American Brevet Brigadier General and military physician. He was the Medical Inspector throughout the American Civil War, notable for his service at the II Corps camp during the Battle of Gettysburg.

== Early years ==
John was born on March 9, 1810. After graduating from Athens College (now Athens State University) and the United States Military Academy, he began his military service on April 1, 1834, as an Assistant Surgeon. He saw active military combat at the Creek War of 1836 as well as the Second Seminole War. Cuyler would also serve the Mexican–American War and was promoted to Major and Surgeon on February 16, 1847, as well as officially being part of the United States Medical Corps. Before the American Civil War, he was stationed at the United States Military Academy from 1848 to 1855.

== American Civil War ==
Despite being a Southerner, Cuyler chose to stay loyal to the Union and was the senior medical officer at Fort Monroe throughout the first years of the war. On June 11, 1862, Cuyler was promoted to Medical Inspector and Acting medical Inspector General as well as to Lieutenant Colonel.

During the Battle of Gettysburg, Cuyler served at the II Corps field hospital and while operating a gangrenous wound, his scalpel slipped and cut into his finger. Not wanting to become potentially infected with the disease nor spreading the disease to the other patients, Cuyler amputated his own finger. Cuyler was then brevetted Colonel on November 29, 1864, and brevetted Brigadier General on March 13, 1865, for "faithful and meritorious services during the war". Cuyler continued serving in the Army, being promoted to a full colonel on June 26, 1876, before retiring on June 30, 1882.

== Personal life ==
Cuyler married Mary Campbell Wayne on October 15, 1840, at Christ Church and proceeded to have 2 children with her: James Wayne Cuyler and William Clarendon Cuyler. He then moved to Morristown, New Jersey at one point before dying there on April 26, 1884, and being buried at Laurel Grove Cemetery.

== See also ==
- List of American Civil War brevet generals (Union)
