= Greville Howard (St Ives MP) =

British Conservative and National Liberal politician

Lieutenant-Commander Greville Reginald Charles Howard (7 September 1909 – 20 September 1987) was a British Conservative and National Liberal politician.

Howard was a younger son of Henry Howard, 19th Earl of Suffolk, by his wife Margaret (née Leiter). Charles Howard, 20th Earl of Suffolk, was his elder brother.

Howard was a member of Westminster City Council, and served as Mayor of Westminster from 1946 to 1947. He served as Member of Parliament (MP) for St Ives from 1950 until he stood down at the 1966 general election.

Howard married Mary, daughter of William Smith Ridehalgh, in 1945. He died in September 1987, aged 78.

Parliament of the United Kingdom
Preceded by Alec Beechman	Member of Parliament for St Ives; 1950–1966	Succeeded by John Nott
