= Leiter House =

Mansion in Washington, D.C. (1893–1947)

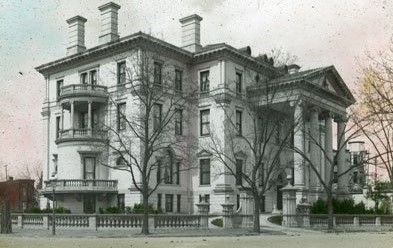
- Leiter House in the early 1900s

- Location within Washington, D.C.

General information
- Architectural style: Neoclassical
- Location: Washington, DC, United-States
- Coordinates: 38°54′39″N 77°02′35″W
- Completed: 1893
- Demolished: 1947
- Owner: Levi Leiter

Design and construction
- Architect: Theophilus P. Chandler Jr.

The Leiter House was a mansion that once stood at 1500 New Hampshire Avenue NW in the Dupont Circle neighborhood of Washington, D.C. Completed in 1893 for wealthy businessman Levi Leiter, the palatial 55-room neoclassical residence was designed by architect Theophilus P. Chandler Jr., whose notable works include Trinity Episcopal Church, the Stirling mansion, St. Thomas Episcopal Church, and the North Philadelphia station. The house was one of several mansions that were built in the late 19th and early 20th centuries around the perimeter of Dupont Circle, a traffic circle and park that was considered a fashionable area at the time.

Leiter had made his fortune in real estate ventures after cofounding what would later become the Marshall Field & Company department store chain. He and his wife, Mary, wanted to be involved in social circles in the nation's capital and relocated with their children to Washington, D.C. in 1883. They spent the first decade in the city renting another large Dupont Circle house, the James G. Blaine Mansion, before moving into their finished home in 1893. During their time in the city, the Leiters entertained at their residences, hosted foreign dignitaries and members of local society, and hosted a wedding breakfast and reception for their daughter, Mary, to George Curzon, 1st Marquess Curzon of Kedleston.

Following Leiter's death in 1904, his wife continued occupying the house for several years, hosting the weddings of their other daughters, including Margaret to Henry Howard, 19th Earl of Suffolk. Mary gifted the house to her son, Joseph, and daughter-in-law on their wedding day in 1908. Joseph and his wife continued the tradition of hosting social events in the house for the next few decades. The couple allowed the Italian government to use their house during World War I and the Soviet government briefly rented the house for use as diplomatic offices in the 1930s.

During World War II the US government rented the house as office space for the National Advisory Committee for Aeronautics. It was during this time that Joseph's son, Thomas, sold the house to a local architect and real estate developer. Two years after the war, the building was demolished after being stripped of valuable building materials. It was replaced with the Hotel Dupont Plaza, now known as The Dupont Circle Hotel. Of the large residences that once lined Dupont Circle, the only ones that remain are the Blaine Mansion, Patterson Mansion, and Wadsworth House, home of the Sulgrave Club.

== History ==
=== Owner background and construction of the house ===
Levi Ziegler Leiter (1834-1904) was born in Leitersburg, Maryland, the ancestor of Dutch immigrants who arrived in the United States in 1760. After working as a salesman in Springfield, Ohio, Leiter moved to Chicago in 1854 and found employment working in a dry goods store. Eleven years later he and a coworker, Marshall Field, created a business partnership with Potter Palmer. The trio opened a department store, Field, Palmer and Leiter & Co., that same year. Palmer retired two years later and the two remaining partners continued to run their successful business venture and soon became wealthy. In 1881 Leiter sold his stake in the department store business to Field for $6 million and focused on his real estate ventures. The department store chain would survive until 2005 as Marshall Field's, when it was purchased by Macy's, Inc. Over the next ten years Leiter's fortune tripled and his real estate ventures included the Second Leiter Building, one of the first skyscrapers built with steel frames, designed by architect William Le Baron Jenney. Leiter was also a philanthropist, donating money to Chicago institutions including the Art Institute of Chicago, where he served as its second president, and the Chicago Public Library.

Leiter's wife, Mary Theresa Carver (1844-1913), was a former schoolteacher from Utica, New York, and a descendant of John Carver, the first governor of the Plymouth Colony. Though the two had become wealthy from Levi's business ventures, they were considered "new money" and not accepted in Chicago's social circles. The couple and their four children, Joseph, Mary Victoria, Nancy, and Margaret, moved to Washington, D.C. for the winter of 1893, joining Field and Palmer who were also spending the winter in the nation's capital. The Leiters rented the large home of politician James G. Blaine which was located in the fashionable residential area of Dupont Circle. The mansion was rented for $11,500 a year, an incredible sum at the time that was noted as being the most expensive rent paid for a house in the city. It's believed that the Leiters did not mind people knowing how much they paid because it was a way to let Washingtonians know how wealthy they were.

For the next decade the family lived in their rented mansion in Washington, D.C., a home in Chicago, their home in Wisconsin, and also traveled to Europe. The Leiters decided to build their own home in the city, joining the ranks of large homes on Dupont Circle like the Blaine Mansion and Stewart's Castle. In February 1891 Leiter purchased a lot on Square 135 from William Walter Phelps at a cost of $83,276.53. The building permit, No. 2562, was issued on June 12 that same year. The Leiters selected architect Theophilus P. Chandler Jr. to design their new house. Chandler's noted works include religious buildings such as the Church of the New Jerusalem, Trinity Episcopal Church, and the nearby St. Thomas Episcopal Church (destroyed), as well as residential buildings including Stirling and the Bishop Mackay-Smith House. He was most active in Pennsylvania, where he designed the North Philadelphia station and helped found the School of Architecture at the University of Pennsylvania.

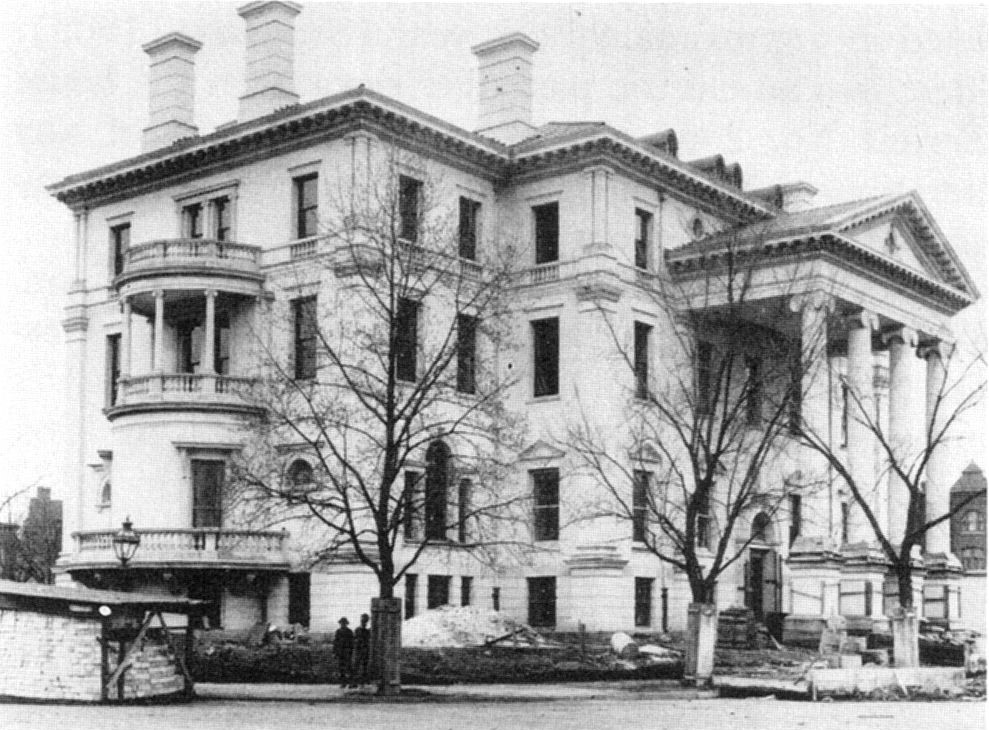
Leiter House under construction

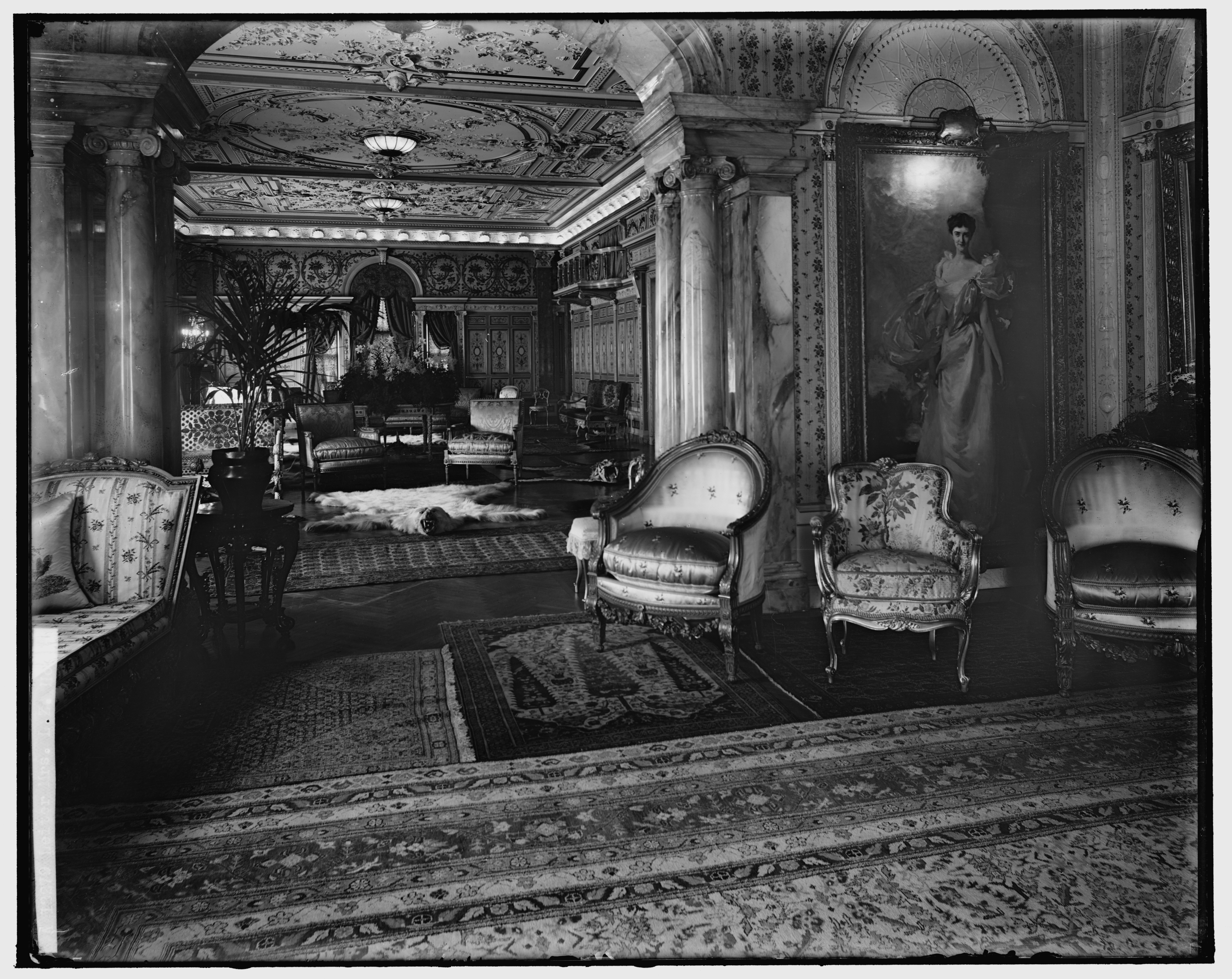
Leiter House interior

The house was built at an estimated cost of $125,000 by general contractors J.E. and A.L. Pennock, who had also built the nearby Administration Building, Carnegie Institution of Washington. The cream-colored neoclassical house made of terracotta bricks and gray stone was three stories tall not including the basement, was 96 feet (29 m) long, 75 feet (23 m) wide, 62 feet (19 m) tall, and contained 55 rooms. The entrance with an elaborate porte-cochère faced New Hampshire Avenue and not the traffic circle. Instead a two-story alcove with balconies and balustrade faced Dupont Circle. After entering the house there was a large vestibule. To the right was a large marble stairway leading to the great hall, which was 75 feet (23 m) long and 28 feet (8.5 m) wide, and to the left a stairway leading to the basement. Off the great hall was the wood-paneled music room which featured a large fireplace and ceiling panels. This room faced 19th Street and measured 65 feet (20 m) long and 32 feet (9.8 m) wide. Also off the great hall was the entrance to two rooms that overlooked Dupont Circle. At the end of the first floor vestibule was a stairway leading to a large landing featuring an ornate stained glass window. The entrance to the dining room was to the right of this stairway. Continuing up the stairs to the second floor led to another large hallway almost the length of the one found on the first floor. The same stairway led to the third floor. An elevator was later installed in 1902. The bedroom for one of the Leiter daughters was described as being Louis XIV style, featuring eight French paintings, carved woodwork, a white marble ceiling, and an elaborate fireplace. The family moved into their completed house in 1893.

=== Levi and Mary ===
After their house was completed, Mary Leiter wasted no time in her attempt to enter local society, a venture her husband did not care about though he nevertheless supported his wife's endeavors. After early mishaps Mary eventually gained a reputation as a member of the social elites. Her parties proved to be popular among locals and these events were often full of surprises, such as when she had a large ribbon hung in the ballroom that separated what she described as the social elites from the others. In April 1895 the Leiters hosted a breakfast for 150 guests at their home on the morning of their eldest daughter's wedding. The wedding of Mary Victoria to Englishman George Curzon, 1st Marquess Curzon of Kedleston, who would later become Viceroy of India, was held at St. John's Episcopal Church. British Ambassador Julian Pauncefote, 1st Baron Pauncefote, and First Lady Frances Cleveland, a close friend of Mary Victoria, were among those in attendance. The wedding reception, described at the time as brilliant, was also held at the Leiter House. The dowry provided by Levi for Mary Victoria was reportedly $3–5 million. Her daughter's new status in the British Empire helped elevate Mary even further up the Washington social ladder.

Soon after the Leiter House was being described as being "better equipped for large entertainments than any other house in Washington." One particular event secured Mary's status as "Queen of Washington Society." In January 1898 Mary made plans for her daughter Nancy's formal debut and intentionally planned the event to occur on the same night as a dance being held by "old" Washington society. After the invitations were sent for the latter, Mary sent her own invitations. The organizers of the dance asked her to postpone the event, but she refused. Mary let those who were invited to both events know that if they attended the dance, they would no longer be welcome at her social gatherings. Almost everyone, including all invited diplomats and their families, attended Nancy's debut. One news report said "[Mary] deliberately submitted the question of her superior popularity to a crucial test such as a society leader rarely invites and the result was entirely satisfactory."

A few years after the Leiter House was completed, the Patterson Mansion and Wadsworth House (now the Sulgrave Club) were built. When the Townsend House on Massachusetts Avenue was built nearby, news reports made note that it would be almost twice the size of the Leiter House. The Leiters continued hosting social gatherings at their home, cementing their status as Washington elites, with receptions attended by Treasury Secretary Lyman J. Gage, Secretary of War Elihu Root, Supreme Court Chief Justice Melville Fuller, Speaker of the House David B. Henderson, and dozens of other politicians and government officials.

When Levi died in 1904 from heart disease, his estimated net worth was $30 million. Later that year Nancy married British military officer Colin Campbell, whom she had met while visiting her older sister in India, at a wedding that took place inside the Leiter House. Because the family was still in mourning, the event was small and only attended by less than a dozen people, one of whom was Henry Howard, 19th Earl of Suffolk, the fiancé of the youngest Leiter daughter, Margaret, also known as Daisy. Margaret's wedding took place the following month and much like her sister's event, it took place at the Leiter House and was subdued due to her father's recent death.

The last of the Leiter children to be married was Joseph (1868-1932), who had gained a reputation as a prominent local businessman. While his father was still alive, Joseph had tried to corner the wheat market but was unsuccessful. His competitors prevailed and Joseph lost $10 million, an amount his father paid in order to settle his son's debts. Joseph was able to recover financially and once again became a successful businessman. He married Juliette Williams, the daughter of an America army colonel, in June 1908. As a wedding gift, Mary gave Joseph and Juliette the Dupont Circle house. She had made improvements to the property, including the addition of a greenhouse on two adjoining lots the family had purchased, the replacement of the tile roof with red slate, and a two-story brick addition on the rear of the house that was designed by Jules Henri de Sibour. Mary continued living in the home and hosting social events until her death in 1913. Her funeral, which took place inside the house, was attended by members of society including diplomats. Upon her death, members of society not only from Washington, D.C., but also Boston, Philadelphia, and Chicago, wondered who would take her place as leader of the "smart set."

=== Subsequent ownership ===
Joseph and Juliette split their time between the Dupont Circle house and another house they had built near Langley, Virginia, for the next 20 years. In 1917 during World War I the couple lent the house to representatives of the Italian government, including Prince Ferdinando, who were escorted from Union Station to Dupont Circle by two cavalry troops. At the end of the war, British military officers attended a victory ball held at the house. Juliette continued the tradition of holding elaborate social gatherings at the house, hosting events attended by diplomats, politicians, and other members of society. One such event included a reception for the future Edward VIII. To avoid running out of alcoholic beverages for these events during Prohibition, Joseph had $300,000 worth of liquors and wines stocked in the house cellar.

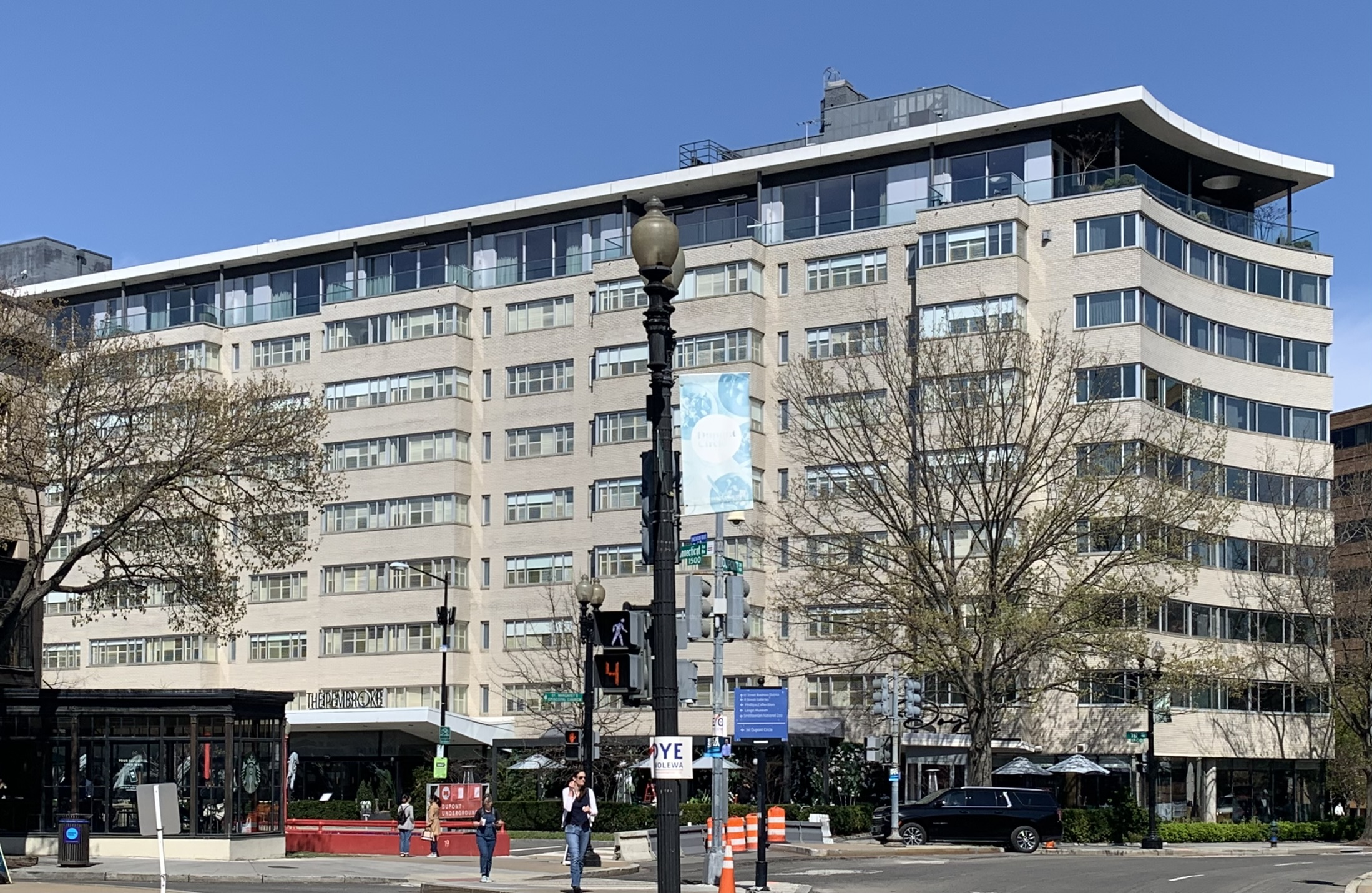
The Leiter House was demolished and replaced with Dupont Plaza, today added onto and known as the Dupont Circle Hotel.

When Joseph died in 1932, he left the bulk of his fortune of approximately $10 million to Juliette. The Dupont Circle house was given to their surviving son, Thomas. In his will Joseph stated: "I request that Thomas permit my wife, Juliette, during her life to use the house at Dupont Circle, Washington, for herself and as a common home for the children." He left their daughter, Nancy, the Virginia home and securities holdings. Two years later the Soviet government rented the house to use as diplomatic office space while the family was not using the property. Two of the last major social events that took place at the house involved Nancy. The first was her formal debut in 1935 and the second was her wedding to Charles Thomas Clagett Jr in February 1941. The wedding was attend by 100 people and another 200 were invited to a wedding breakfast.

=== Demolition ===
In 1941 Juliette chose to make her permanent home at Beverly, Massachusetts, leaving the Dupont Circle house vacant, which a local news report lamented: "For Washington society the breaking up of the Leiter menage means more than just a change of residence for the family. It's the finish of an era of lavish and elegant entertaining that none of us may ever see again." After Juliette died in 1942, the house was rented by the US government during World War II as office space for the National Advisory Committee for Aeronautics. The house was rezoned for apartment use that same year, despite objections from neighbors including the Woman's National Democratic Club, headquartered at the nearby Whittemore House. Thomas sold the house in 1944 for $190,000 to architect and real estate developer Alvin C. Aubinoe, who announced plans to demolish the building and replace it with a hotel.

The house was opened to the public in July 1947, with over 10,000 people going through the building before it was demolished the following month. Salvageable building materials were removed and sold before the Arrow Wrecking Company demolished the house and afterwards people went through the wreckage, hoping to find valuables that had been forgotten. The Dupont Plaza Hotel, later called the Jurys Washington Hotel and now The Dupont Circle Hotel, was built shortly afterwards. The three remaining mansions on or near the perimeter of Dupont Circle are the Blaine Mansion, Patterson Mansion, and Wadsworth House.

== See also ==
- Henderson Castle
