= First Presbyterian Church (Pittsburgh) =

First Presbyterian Church of Pittsburgh
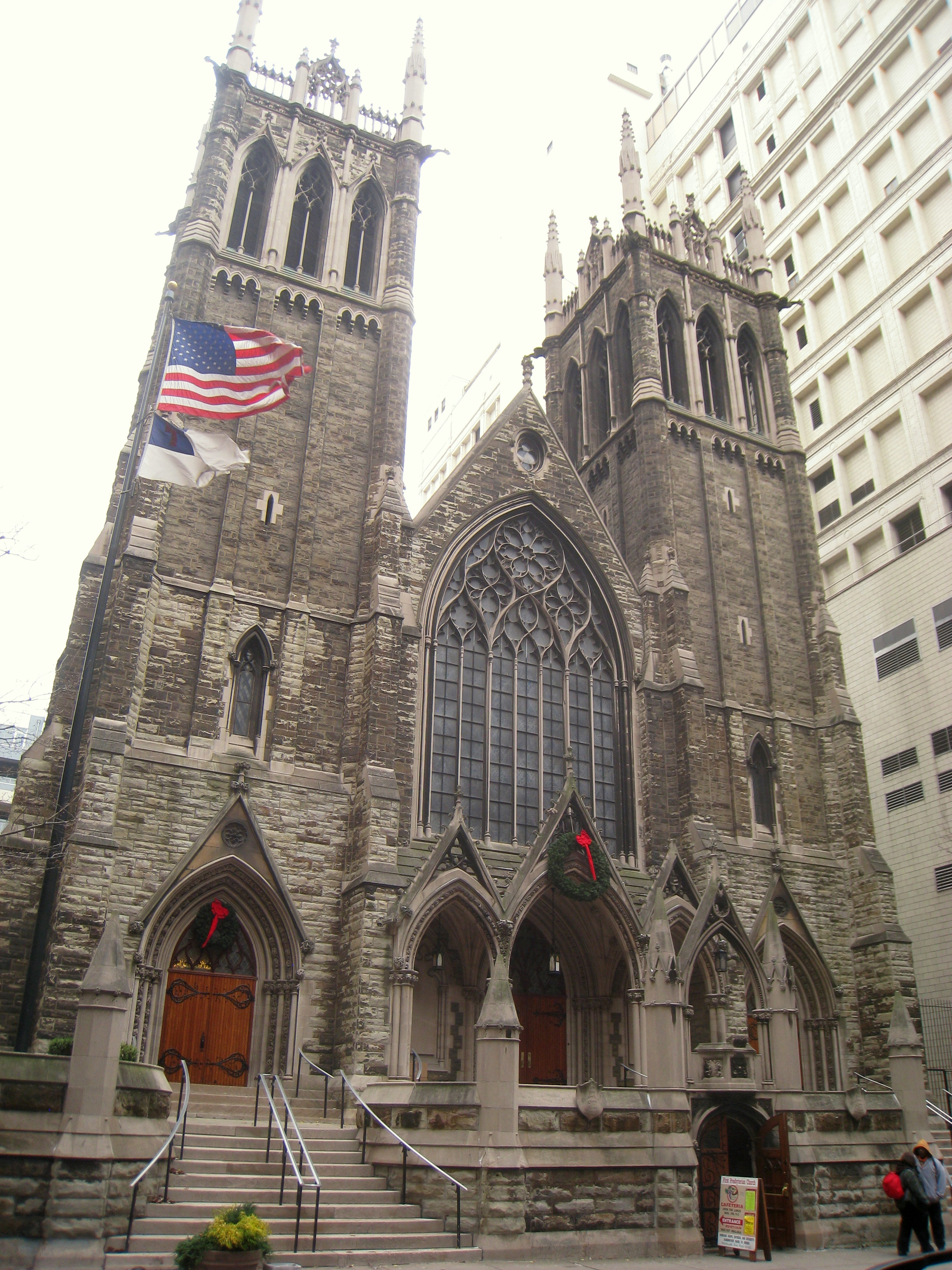
- First Presbyterian Church of Pittsburgh
- 40.441522°N 79.999121°W
- Location: 320 Sixth Avenue Pittsburgh, PA 15222
- Country: United States
- Denomination: Presbyterian
- Website: Official website

The First Presbyterian Church of Pittsburgh is an active congregation in Pittsburgh, Pennsylvania, USA. The church structure in use today was completed in 1905.

== Architecture ==
The church structure, designed by architect Theophilus Parsons Chandler, was built in 1905 in the neo-Gothic (Gothic-revival) style. 13 of the 253 stained-glass windows were hand-painted by Tiffany Studios. The main worship hall also feature a pair of 30 foot, two-ton oak doors, still in operation, which can be rolled open to the choir.

== History ==
An exact date for the formation of the congregation may never be known. There is evidence going back as far as 1783 in the account of Mr. John Wilkins:

. . . I arrived in Pittsburgh November 10 . . . it seemed odd to me that the Presbyterian ministers were afraid to come to the place . . . something ought to be done toward establishing a Presbyterian church in this place and encourage it. After some time a Rev. Samuel Barr came to town and preached a few sermons. We seemed pleased with him and made him an offer, which he accepted, and was ordained in what is now called the First Presbyterian congregation in Pittsburgh.

A bill was passed in the Legislative Assembly at Philadelphia to incorporate a Presbyterian Congregation in Pittsburgh on 29 September 1787.

== Images ==
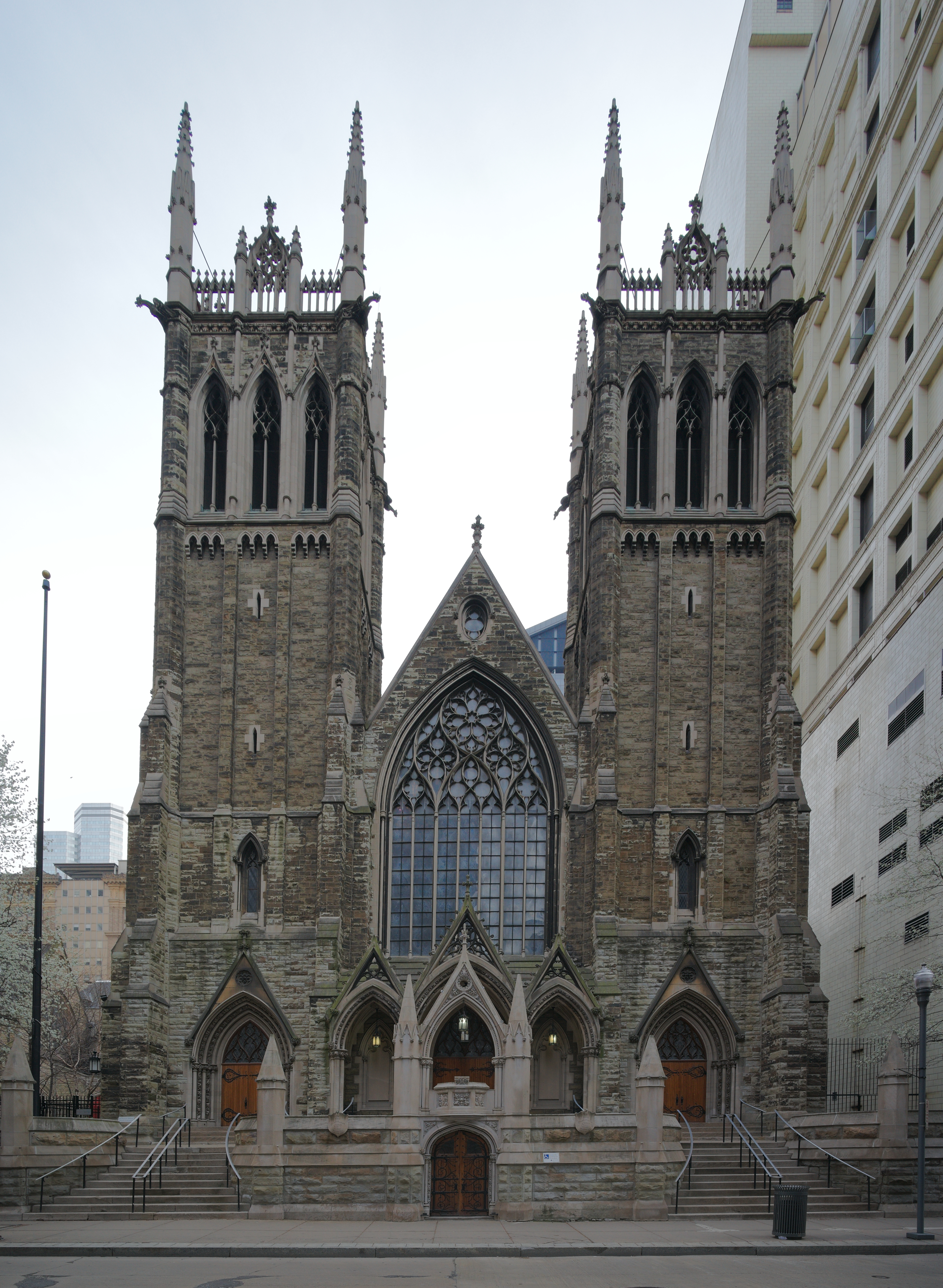
First Presbyterian Church of Pittsburgh in 2016

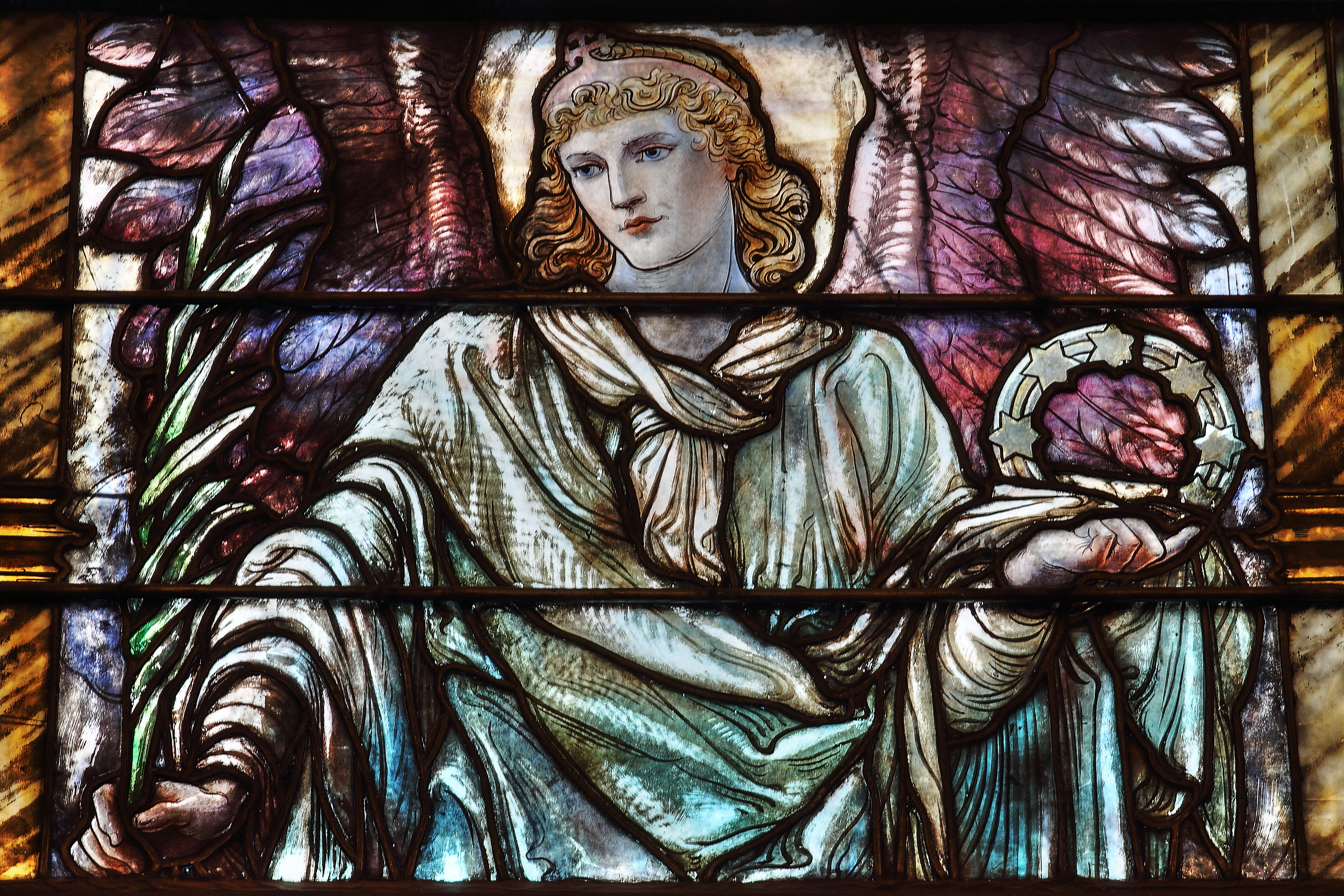
One of the stained glass windows created by Tiffany Studios

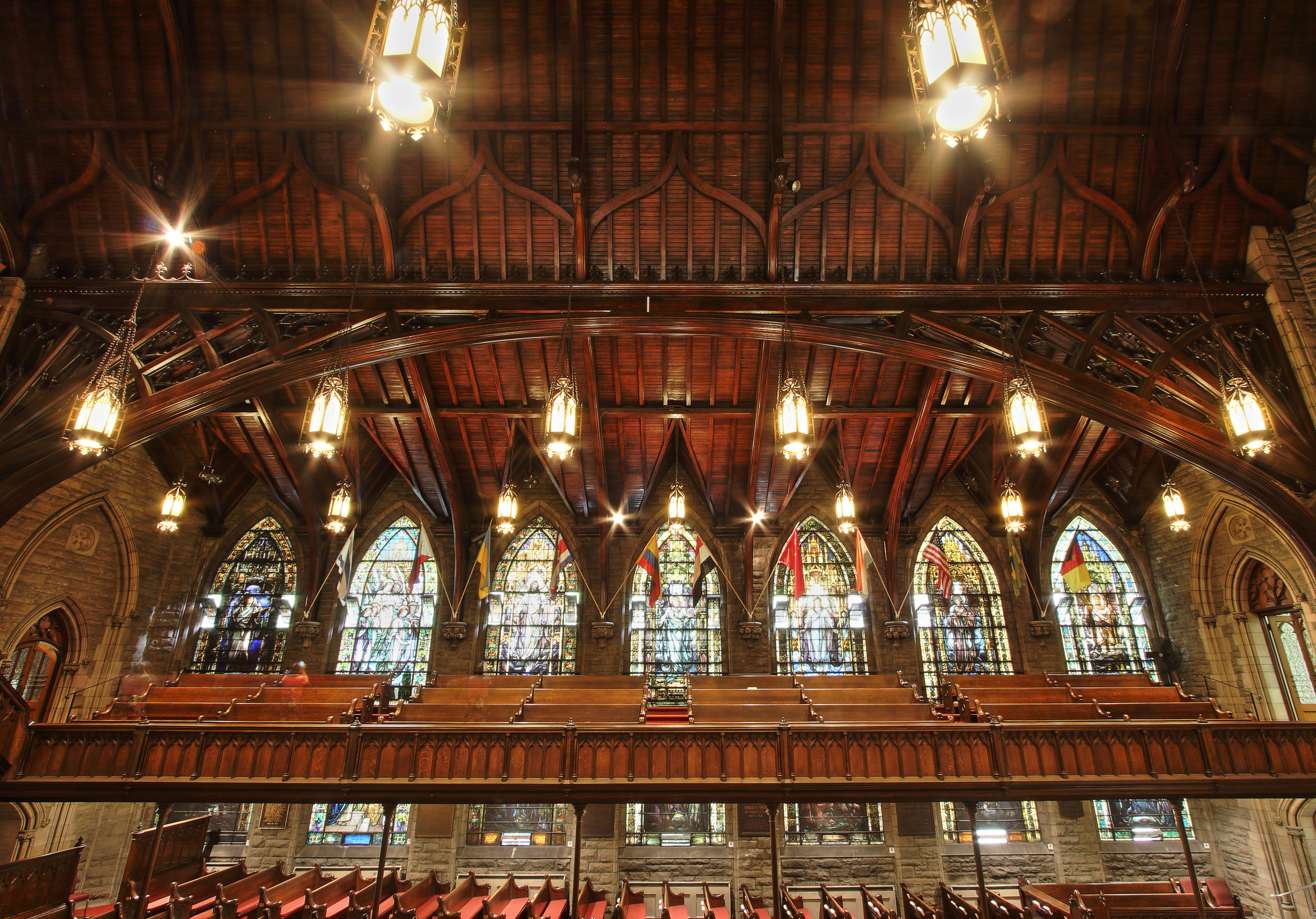
Wooden ceiling and the eastern wall of stained glass windows

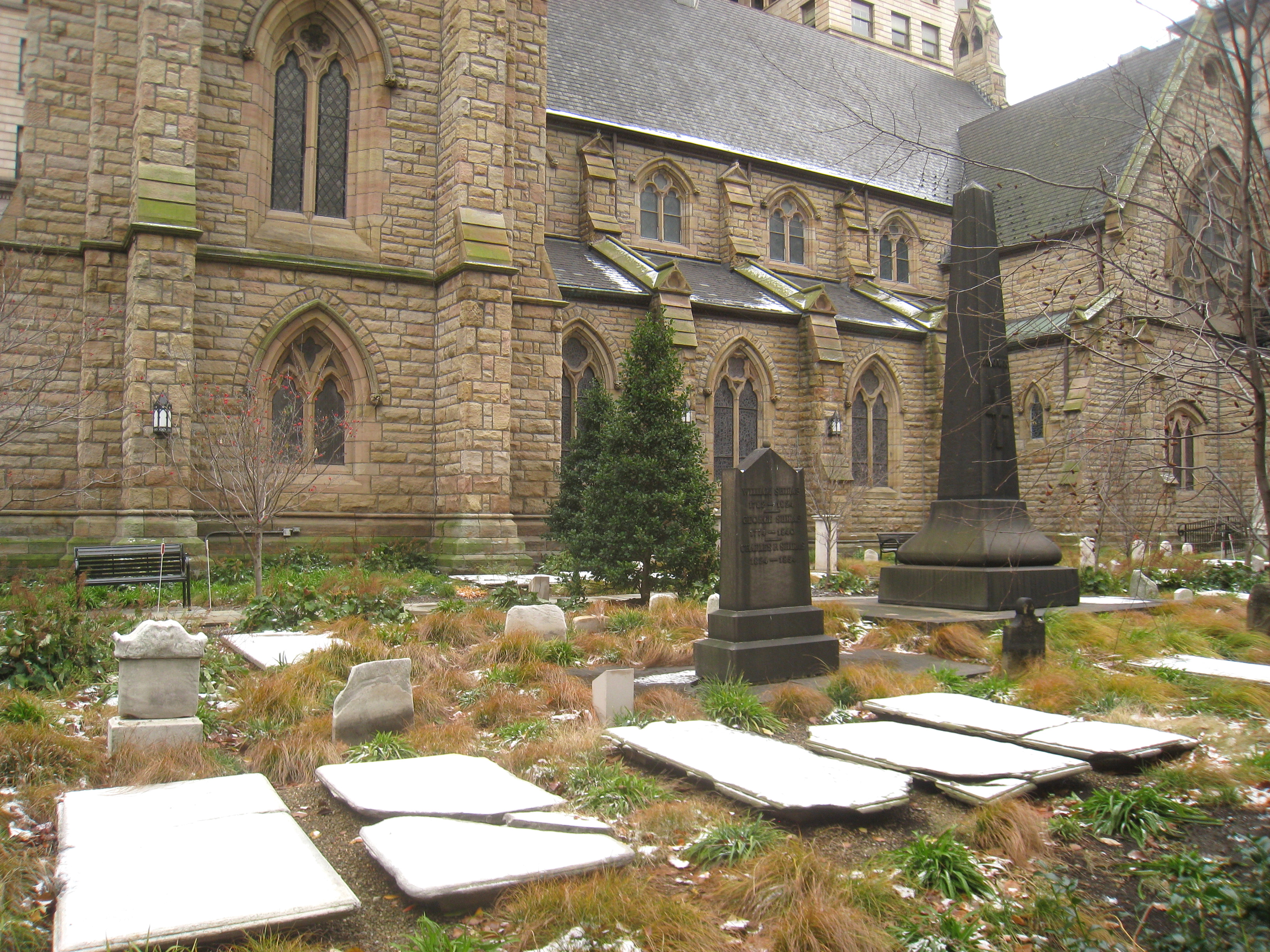
The cemetery
