= Bridge in Radnor Township No. 1 =

- U.S. National Register of Historic Places
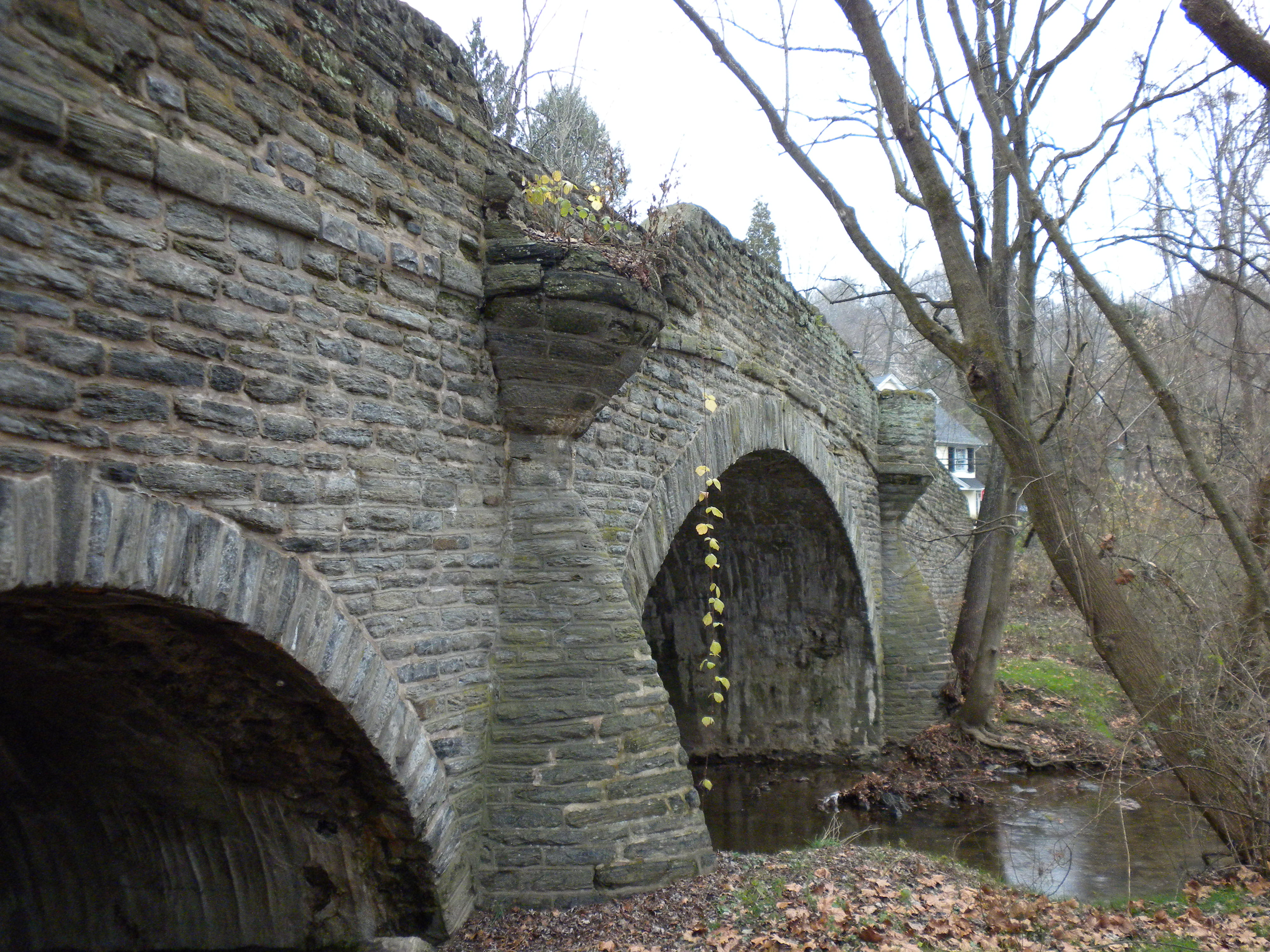
- Bridge in Radnor Township No. 1, November 2009

- Location within Pennsylvania Location within the United States
- Location: Goshen Road over Darby Creek, Radnor, Pennsylvania
- Coordinates: 40°0′13″N 75°22′19″W
- Area: less than one acre
- Built: 1905
- Built by: J.A. Morris
- Architect: Theophilus P. Chandler
- Architectural style: Multi-span stone arch
- MPS: Highway Bridges Owned by the Commonwealth of Pennsylvania, Department of Transportation TR
- NRHP reference No.: 88000791
- Added to NRHP: June 22, 1988

Bridge in Radnor Township No. 1 is a historic stone arch bridge that carries Goshen Road over Darby Creek to Darby Paoli Road in Radnor, Delaware County, Pennsylvania. The current structure was built in 1905, and is an 80-foot-long (24 m), arch bridge with three arch spans of 45-foot (14 m), 19-foot (5.8 m), and 16-foot-long (4.9 m). It features an unfinished stone parapet cap. It spans the Darby Creek.

It was listed on the National Register of Historic Places in 1988.
