= Theophilus P. Chandler Jr. =

American architect

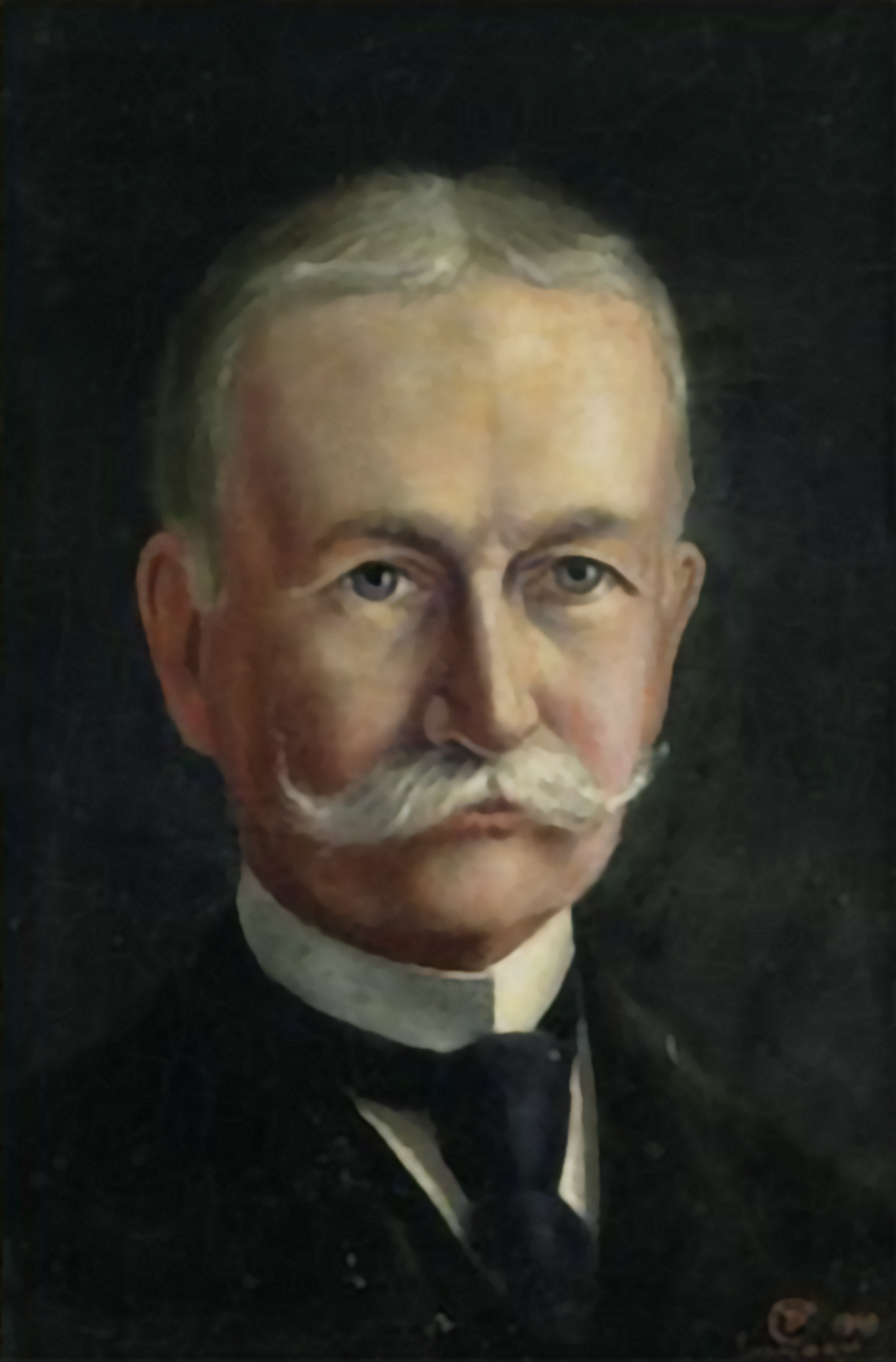
- Self portrait, 1909
- Born: September 7, 1845; Boston, Massachusetts, U.S.
- Died: August 16, 1928 (aged 82); Radnor Township, Pennsylvania, U.S.
- Burial place: St. David's Episcopal Church Cemetery
- Education: Harvard University
- Occupation: architect
- Notable work: Church of the New Jerusalem; First Presbyterian Church; Trinity Episcopal Church; Stirling; Leiter House; Hillsover; Bishop Mackay-Smith House; North Philadelphia station; Church of the Evangel; Bridge in Radnor Township No. 1
- Spouse: Sophie Madeleine du Pont (m. 1873)

1st Head of the School of Architecture at the University of Pennsylvania
- In office 1890–1891
- Succeeded by: Warren Powers Laird

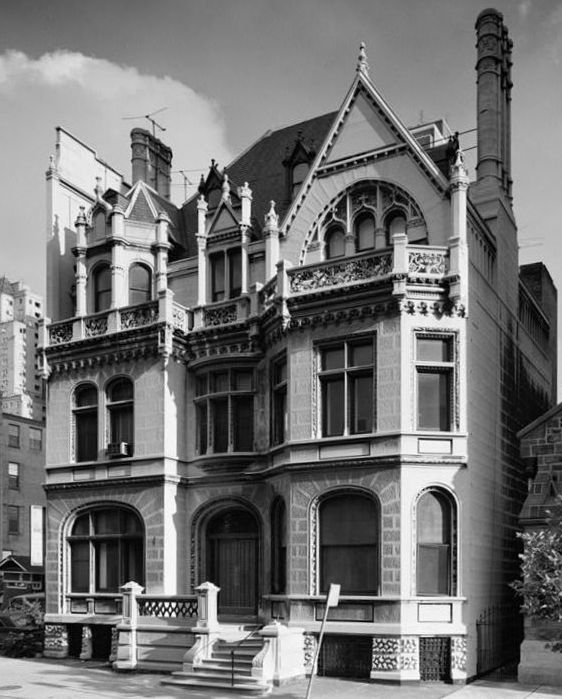
Scott-Wanamaker townhouse, 2032 Walnut St., Philadelphia (1883-86, demolished 1981). The Jacobean Revival façade survives, with modern townhouses built behind it.

Theophilus Parsons Chandler Jr. (September 7, 1845 – August 16, 1928) was an American architect of the late 19th and early 20th centuries. He spent his career at Philadelphia, and is best remembered for his churches and country houses. He founded the Department of Architecture at the University of Pennsylvania (1890), and served as its first head.

== Life and career ==
Born in Boston on September 7, 1845, the son of Theophilus Parsons Chandler and his wife Elizabeth J. Schlatter, Chandler was educated at Harvard University and in the atelier of Joseph Auguste Émile Vaudremer in Paris. Upon returning from France, he was employed by several offices in his native Boston. Under the aegis of noted landscape architect Robert Morris Copeland, he relocated to Philadelphia in 1872, to work on development of the planned community of Ridley Park, Pennsylvania.

Chandler married Sophie Madeleine du Pont (1851–1931) of the distinguished Delaware industrialist family on March 8, 1873. He designed houses or remodeling projects for several of her relatives, including alterations to the mansion that is now the Winterthur Museum.

Chandler designed several of the original buildings for the Philadelphia Zoo, including the temporary North Gatehouse (1874–75, demolished after 1876), the Monkey House (1874–75, demolished 1898), the Eagle House (1874–75, demolished 1905), and the Bear Pits (1874–75, demolished 1977).

Most noted for his ecclesiastical style, Chandler designed major urban churches, including Philadelphia's Church of the New Jerusalem (Swedenborgian), Tabernacle Presbyterian Church, Bethlehem Presbyterian Church; and Pittsburgh's First Presbyterian Church and Third Presbyterian Church. He also designed exquisitely detailed country churches, especially in the Philadelphia suburbs.

As founder and head of the University of Pennsylvania's Department of Architecture, Chandler essentially shaped the architectural climate in Philadelphia. He served as president of the Philadelphia Chapter of the AIA, and sat on the Board of Trustees of the Spring Garden Institute. He persuaded Warren P. Laird to move to Philadelphia to succeed him at Penn and develop a curriculum based on that of the École des Beaux-Arts. French-American architect Paul Cret, in turn, succeeded Laird.

Chandler was an early restoration architect, making often sympathetic additions to historic structures. He designed alterations to Independence Hall (1878, unbuilt), and doubled the width of John Haviland's 1838 Pennsylvania Fire Insurance Company (1902). The latter building was demolished in 1974, but its 4-story white-marble Egyptian-Revival façade stands at 508-10 Walnut Street in Philadelphia.

Chandler's papers, at the University of Pennsylvania Archives, include designs for furniture, a bridge, an elevated wire road (similar to a gondola), and his unsuccessful submission in the 1889 design competition for the Cathedral of Saint John the Divine, New York.

Furniture designed by Chandler was exhibited at the Philadelphia Museum of Art in 1976. The first retrospective exhibition of his work, Theophilus P. Chandler Jr.: Portrait of an American Architect, was held at the Athenaeum of Philadelphia in 2010.

== Personal life ==
Chandler and his wife did not have any children. He was extremely active in the general Philadelphia community, holding memberships in the Union League, The Philadelphia Club, the Radnor Hunt Club, the Society of Mayflower Descendants, and the Sons of the American Revolution.

He was an accomplished amateur painter. He rendered a self-portrait in 1909, which is in the collection of the Athenaeum of Philadelphia.

== Selected works ==
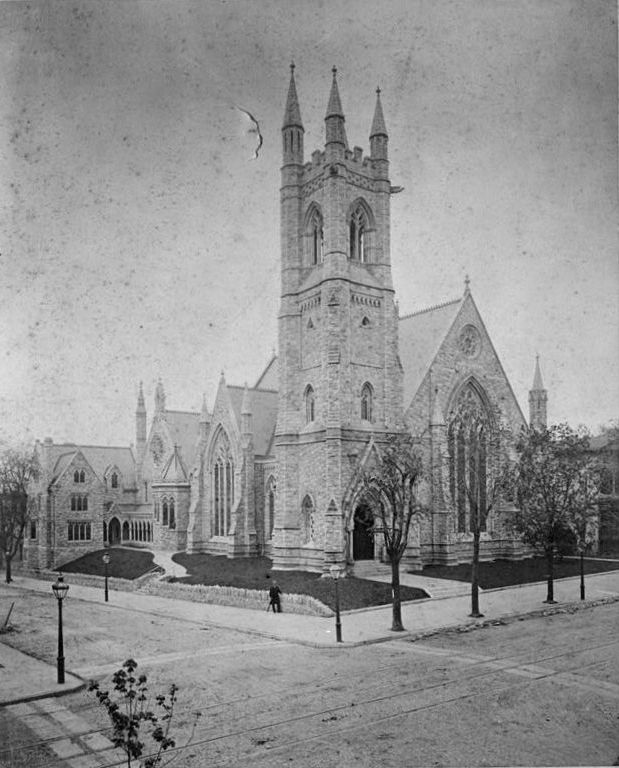
Tabernacle Presbyterian Church, 37th & Chestnut Streets, Philadelphia (1883-86)

=== Churches ===
- Grace Memorial Church, Main Street, Darlington, Maryland (1876–78). This is the largest building constructed of serpentine from the Broad Creek quarry
- Christ Church, Ridley Park, Pennsylvania (1878–80).
- Church of the New Jerusalem (Swedenborgian), 22nd & Chestnut Streets, Philadelphia (c. 1881). Now an office building.
- Tabernacle Presbyterian Church, 37th & Chestnut Streets, Philadelphia (1883–86). Now Tabernacle United Church.
- Bethlehem Presbyterian Church, Broad & Diamond Streets, Philadelphia (1887–89). Now Berean Presbyterian Church.
- Church of St. Asaph, Conshohocken State & St. Asaph's Roads, Bala Cynwyd, Pennsylvania (1888–93).
- Trinity Episcopal Church, 1108 N. Adams Street, Wilmington, Delaware (1890). The Parish House and Rectory were designed by Frank Miles Day.
- Calvary Presbyterian Church, E. 3rd Street & Madison Avenue, Washington, D.C. (c. 1893).
- Church of St. Martin, King of Prussia Road, Radnor, Pennsylvania (1894).
- Third Presbyterian Church, 5701 Fifth Avenue, Pittsburgh (1897–1903). Funded by the widow of William Thaw, the brownstone building was nicknamed, "Mrs. Thaw's Chocolate Church".
- First Presbyterian Church, 6th & Wood Streets, Pittsburgh (1903–05).
- Christ Church Ithan, 536 Conestoga Road, Villanova, Pennsylvania (1919).

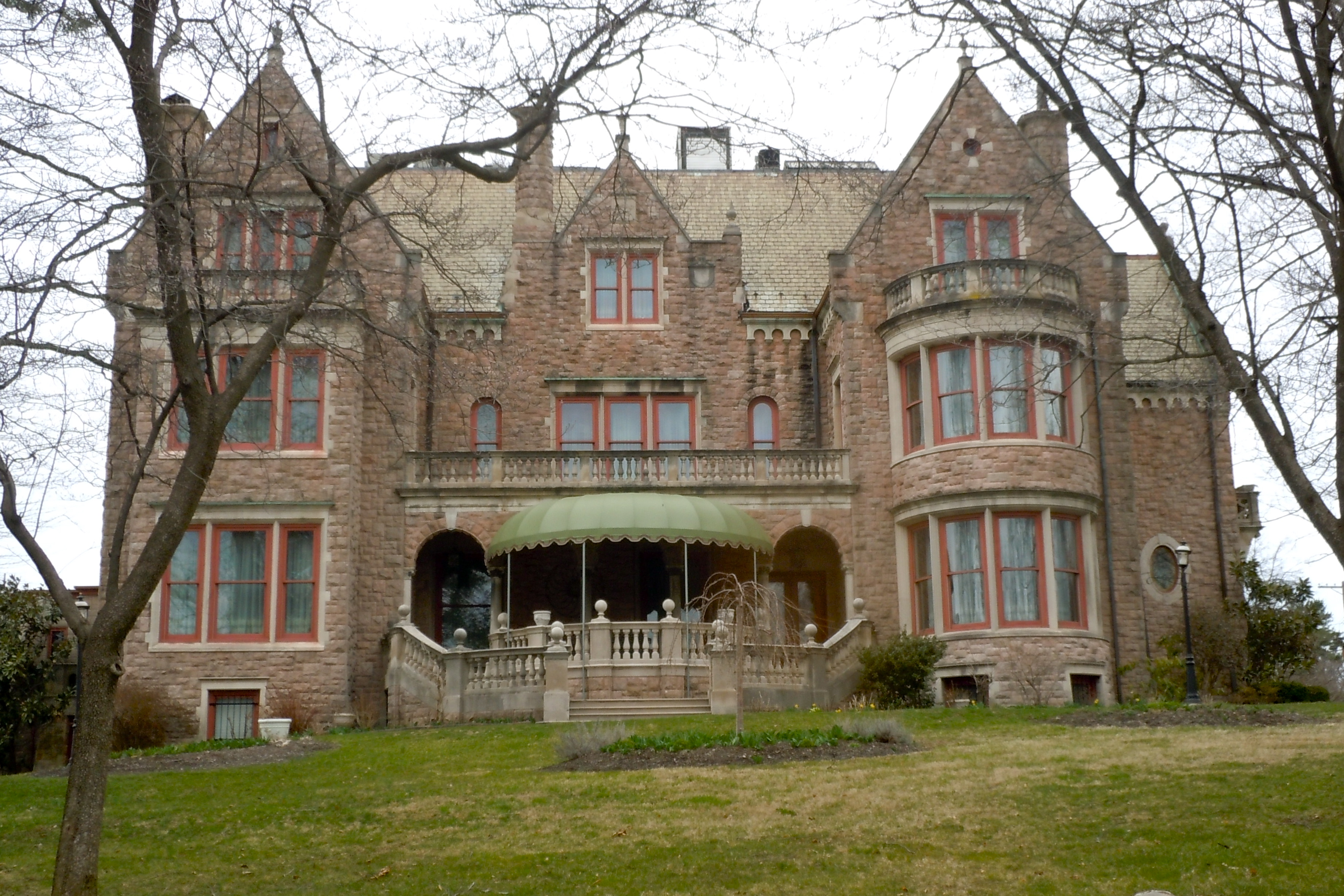
"Stirling" (James Hervey Sternbergh mansion), Reading, Pennsylvania (1890–92)

=== Houses ===
- "Stonecliffe" (Thomas M. Stewart/Mrs. Charles Taylor mansion), 7 Caryl Lane, Chestnut Hill, Philadelphia (1880–81, partially demolished).
- "Ingeborg" (William Simpson Jr. mansion), Overbrook, Pennsylvania (1880–84, demolished 1920s).
- "Fox Hill" (Rudolph Ellis mansion), Bryn Mawr and Ithan Aves., Bryn Mawr, Pennsylvania (1881–82, destroyed by fire). The gatehouse, cabin and east wing survive.
- Scott-Wanamaker townhouse, 2032 Walnut St., Philadelphia (1883–86, demolished following a fire, 1981). The façade survives, with modern townhouses built behind it.
- "Belmont" (Amzi L. Barber mansion), 1312 Clifton Street NW, Washington, D.C. (1883–86, demolished 1915).
- "Rostrevor" (Samuel B. Brown mansion), Booth Lane, Haverford Station, Pennsylvania (1884–86, demolished).
- George Burnham townhouse, 3401 Powelton Avenue, Philadelphia (1886).
- "The Gables" (Ida Dixon mansion), 414 Plush Mill Road, Wallingford, Pennsylvania (1886-1889), now the Wallingford Community Arts Center
- "Compton" (Lydia and John Thompson Morris mansion), Meadowbrook Avenue, Chestnut Hill, Philadelphia (1887–88, demolished 1968). The grounds are now the Morris Arboretum.
- "Lyndhurst" (William and Mary C. Thaw mansion), 1165 Beechwood Boulevard, Squirrel Hill, Pittsburgh (1887–89?, demolished in 1944). Mrs. Thaw was forced to sell "Lyndhurst" to raise funds for her son Harry's legal defense, after he murdered the architect Stanford White.
- St. Asaph's Rectory, Conshohocken State and St. Asaph Roads, Bala Cynwyd, Pennsylvania (1888).
- "Stirling" (James Hervey Sternbergh mansion), 1120 Centre Avenue, Reading, Pennsylvania (1890–92).
- Leiter House, 1500 New Hampshire Avenue NW, Washington, D.C. (1893, demolished 1947)
- "Hillsover" (Lincoln Godfrey mansion), 560 Sproul Road, Radnor, Pennsylvania (1893). Extensively altered by Paul Cret in 1926, and renamed "Launfal," it is presently the Academy of Notre Dame de Namur.
- "Langoma" (Joseph D. Potts mansion), Wyebrook, Chester County, Pennsylvania (1897–1901). Chandler's largest residential design, the 67-room chateau is now a religious retreat operated by the Daughters of St. Mary of Providence.
- Bishop Mackay-Smith House, 251 S. 22nd Street, Philadelphia (1903–04).

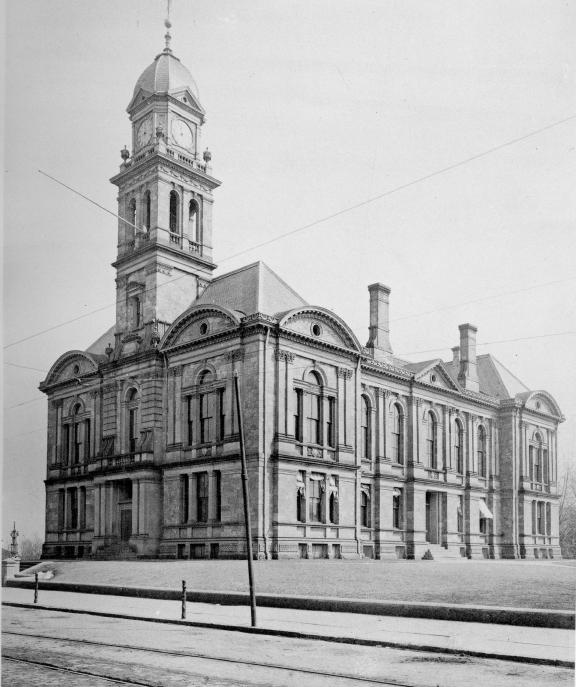
New Castle County Court House, Wilmington, Delaware (1879-80, demolished 1915)

=== Other buildings and structures ===
- Bear Pits, Philadelphia Zoo (1874–75, demolished 1977).
- Thomas P. Duncan Mausoleum, Union Dale Cemetery, Pittsburgh (1879).
- New Castle County Court House, 1000 Market St., Wilmington, Delaware (1879–80, demolished 1915).
- Spring Garden Insurance Company, 431 Walnut St., Philadelphia (1880–81, demolished 1960).
- Philadelphia, Baltimore & Washington Railroad Station, Front & French Streets, Wilmington, Delaware (1881, demolished c. 1907). Frank Furness's French Street Station (1908) replaced it on the site.
- Hayes Mechanics Home for Men, 2210 Belmont Ave., Philadelphia (1886). Now the Hayes Manor Retirement Residence.
- Wanamaker's Grand Depot, Thirteenth and Market Street, Philadelphia (1888, demolished c. 1904).
- Commercial Union Assurance Company, 416-20 Walnut Street, Philadelphia (1889, demolished 1963).
- Gladstone Apartment House, 1101 Pine Street, Philadelphia (1889–90, demolished 1971). Now the site of Louis Kahn Park.
- Alexis I. duPont School, 3130 Kennett Pike, Wilmington, Delaware (1893–94, expanded 1917, 1938, 1960, renovated 1974)
- North Philadelphia Station (Germantown Junction), Pennsylvania Railroad, 2900 N. Broad Street, Philadelphia (1896–1901).
- Alterations to Pennsylvania Fire Insurance Company, 508-10 Walnut Street, Philadelphia (1902, demolished 1974, façade survives).
- Goshen Road Bridge over Darby Creek, Broomall, Pennsylvania (1905).
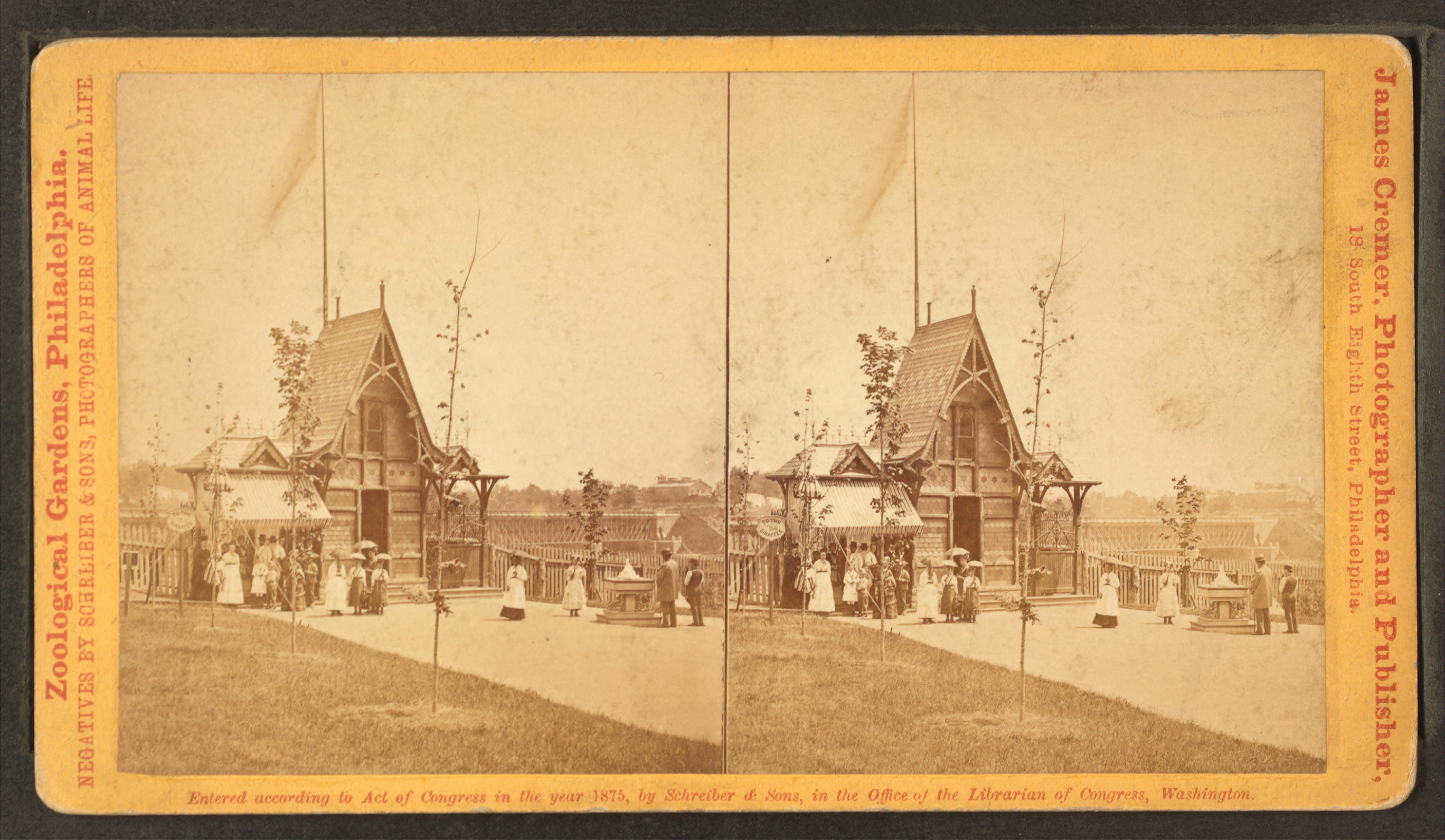
North Entrance, Philadelphia Zoo (1874–75, demolished)

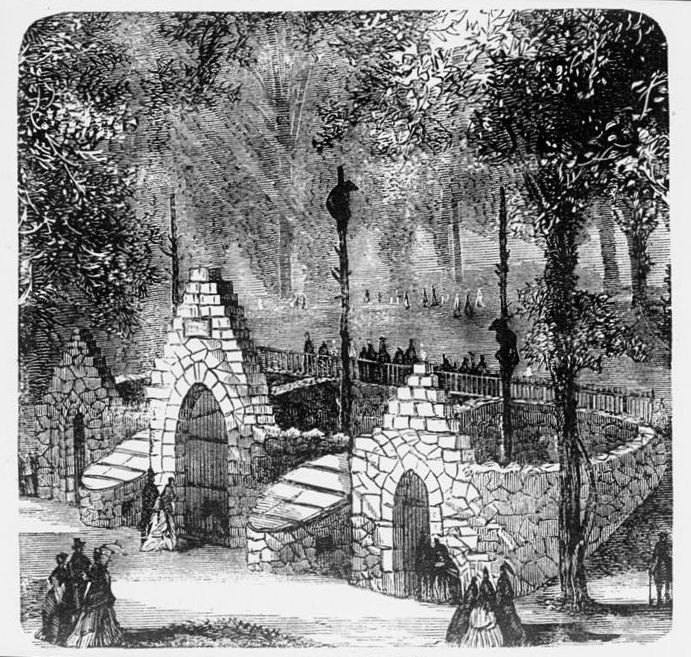
Bear Pits, Philadelphia Zoo (1874–75, demolished 1977), in an 1875 engraving.

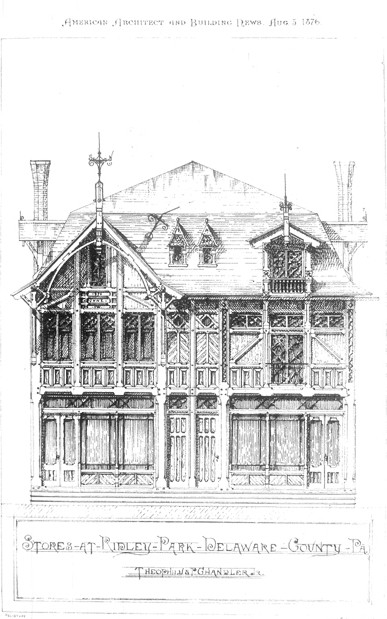
Stores at Ridley Park, Delaware County, Pennsylvania (1876).

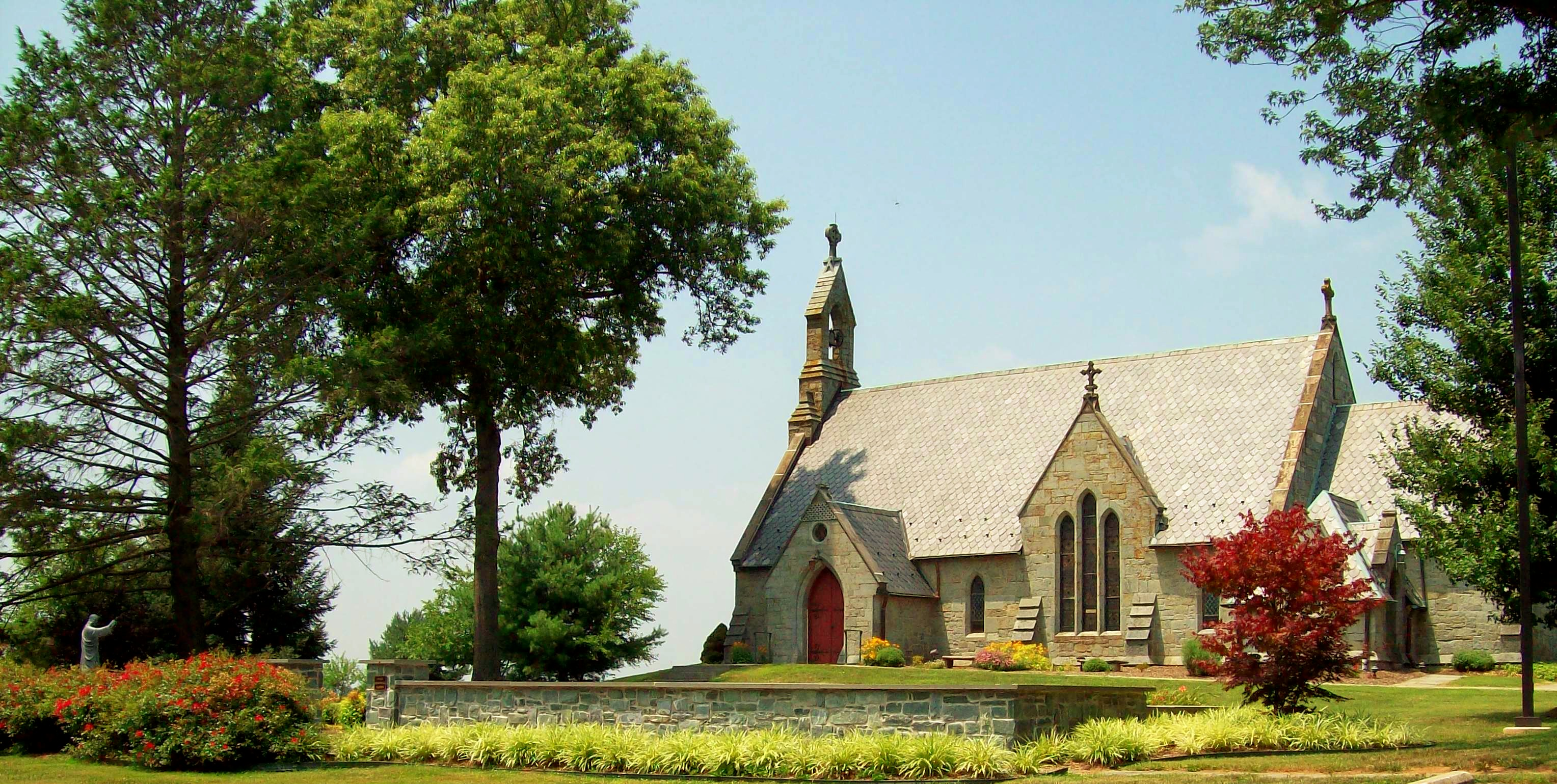
Grace Memorial Church, Darlington, Maryland (1876–78).

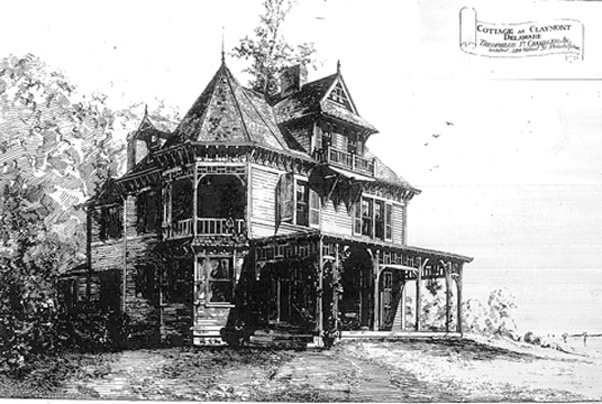
Cottage at Claymont, Delaware (1878)

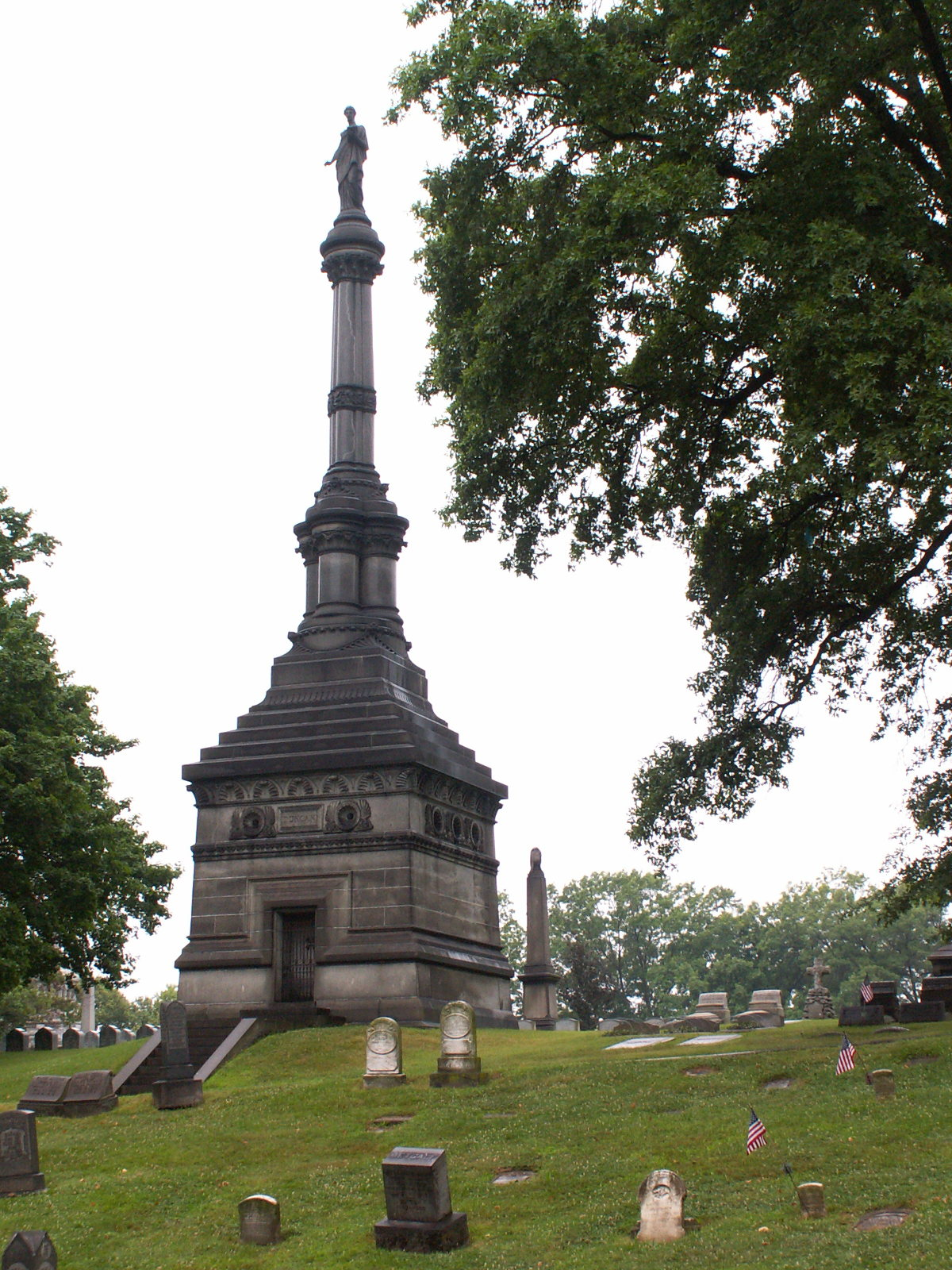
Duncan Mausoleum, Union Dale Cemetery, Pittsburgh (1879)

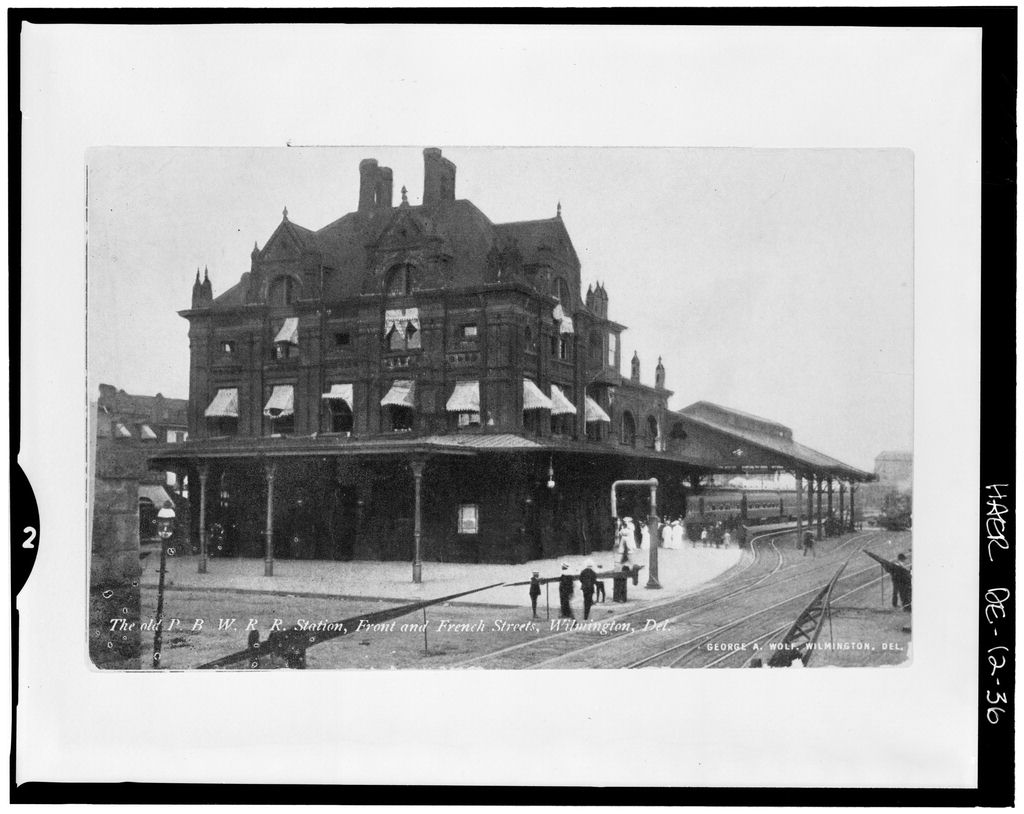
Philadelphia, Baltimore & Washington Railroad Station, Wilmington, Delaware (1881, demolished c. 1907).

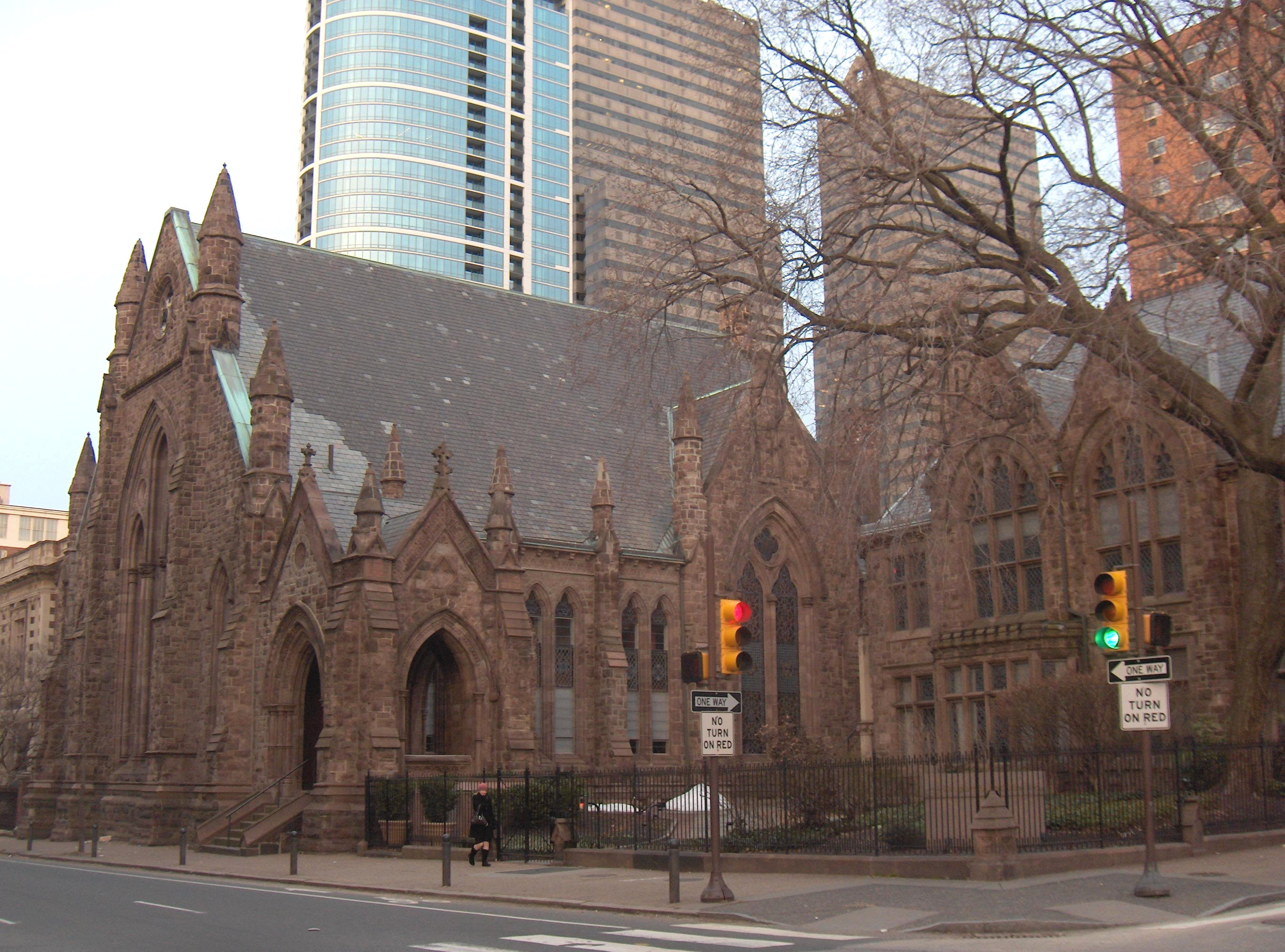
Church of the New Jerusalem, Philadelphia (c. 1881). Now an office building.

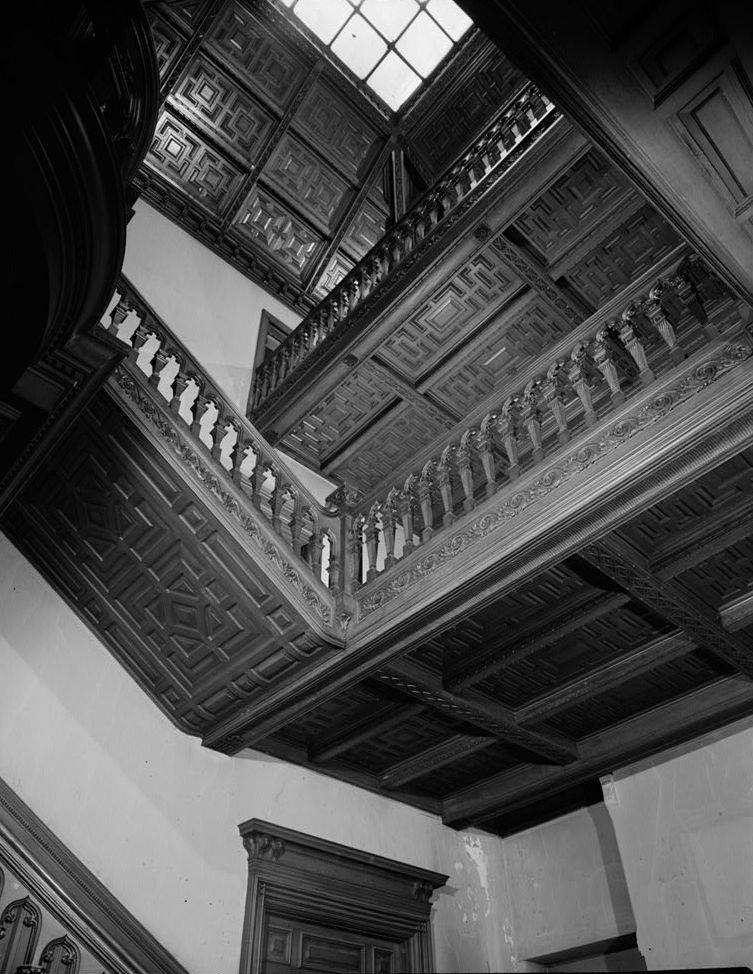
Stairway of Scott-Wanamaker townhouse, Philadelphia (1883–88, demolished 1981)

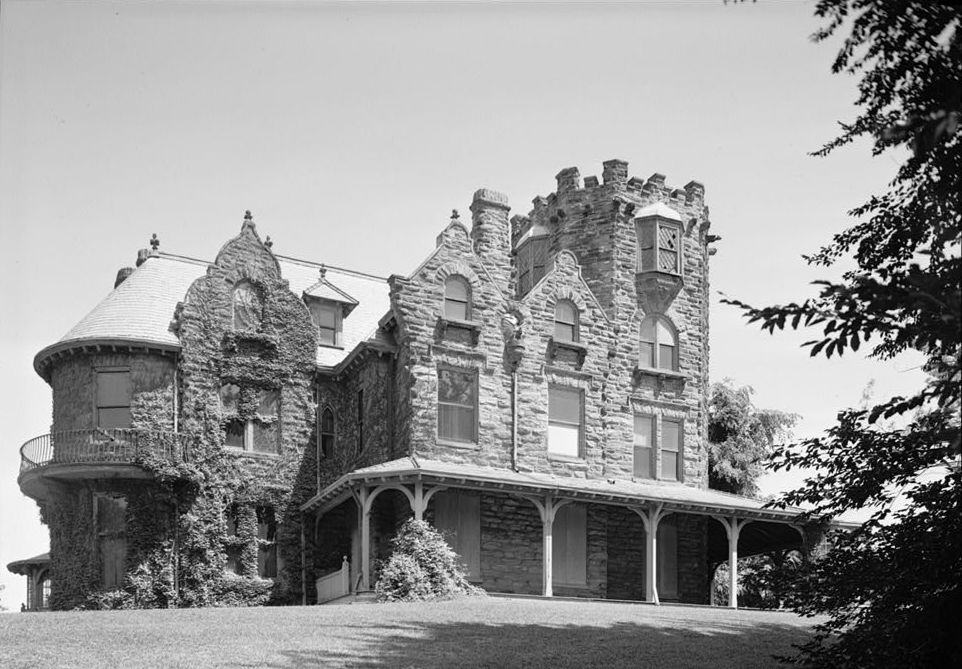
"Compton" (Lydia & John Thompson Morris mansion), Chestnut Hill, Philadelphia (1887–88, demolished 1968). The grounds are now the Morris Arboretum.

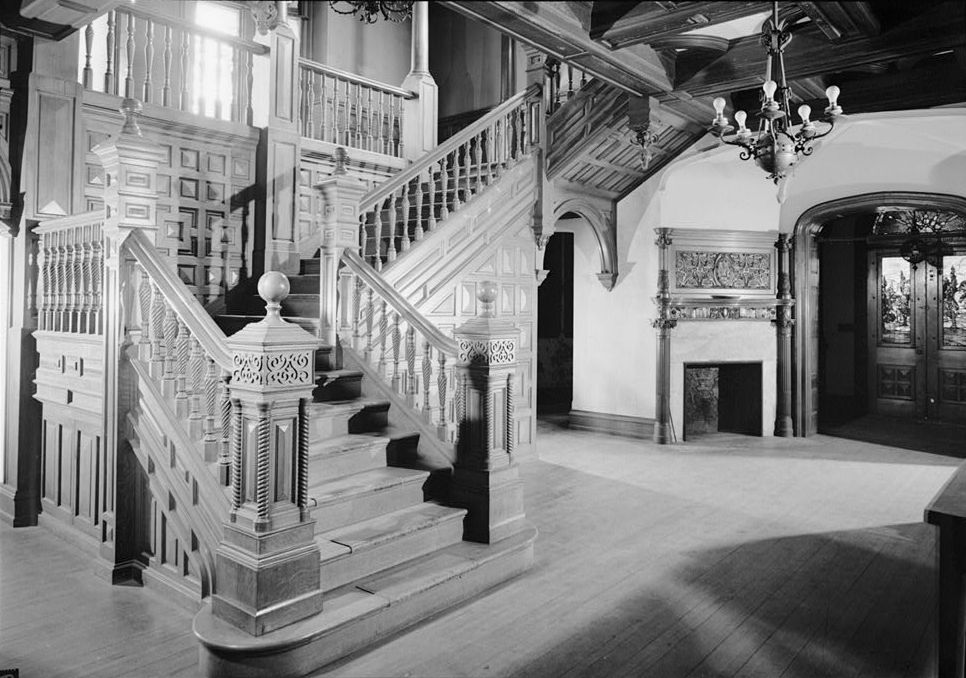
Hall and stair of "Compton."

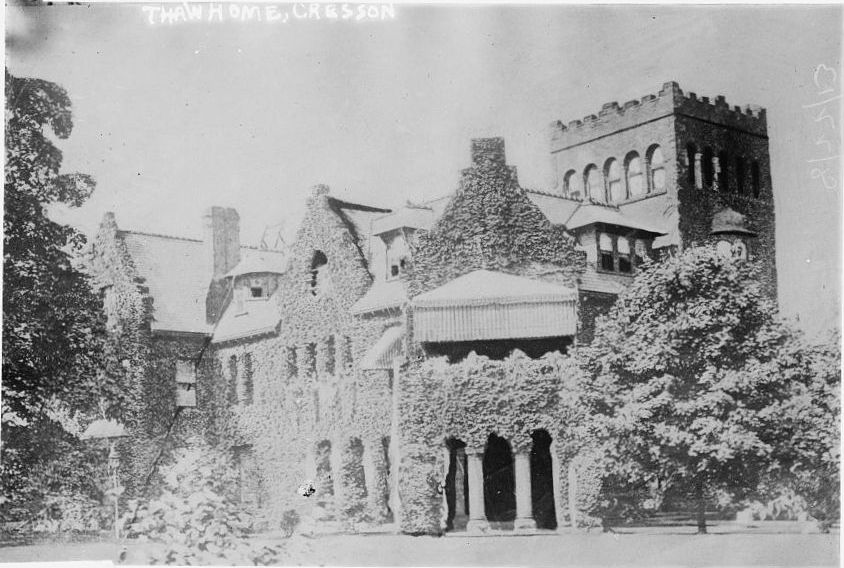
"Lyndhurst" (William & Mary C. Thaw mansion), Pittsburgh (1887–89, demolished in 1944)

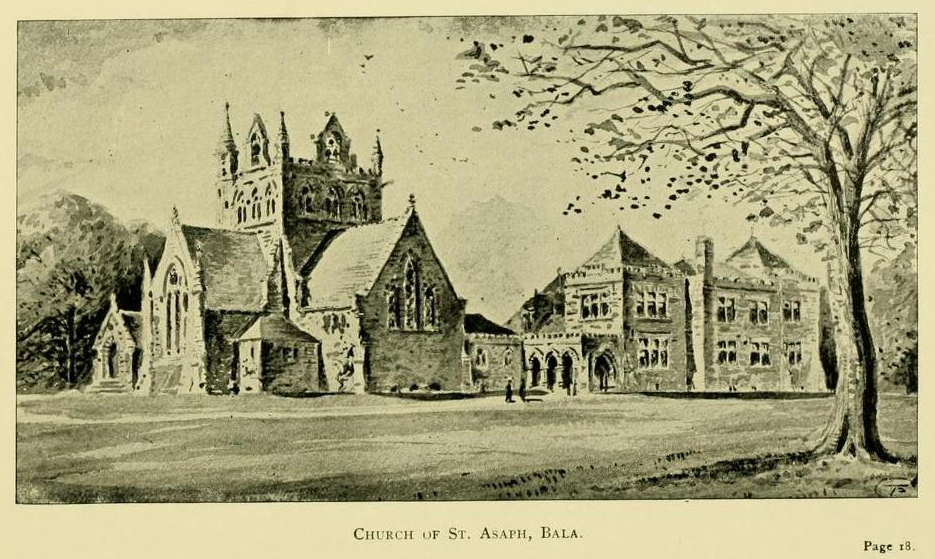
Church of St. Asaph, Bala Cynwydd, Pennsylvania (1888–93).

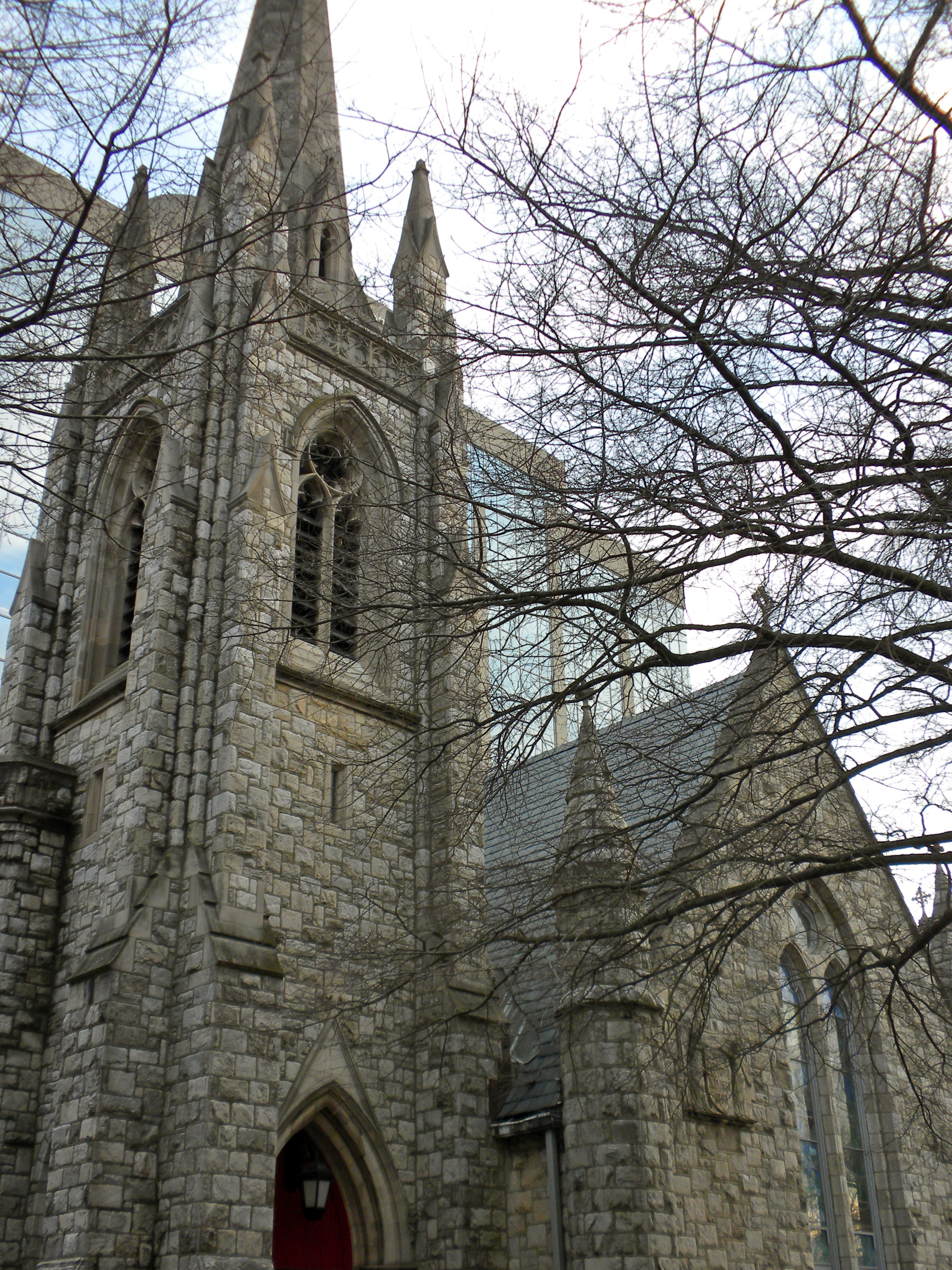
Trinity Episcopal Church, Wilmington, Delaware (1890)

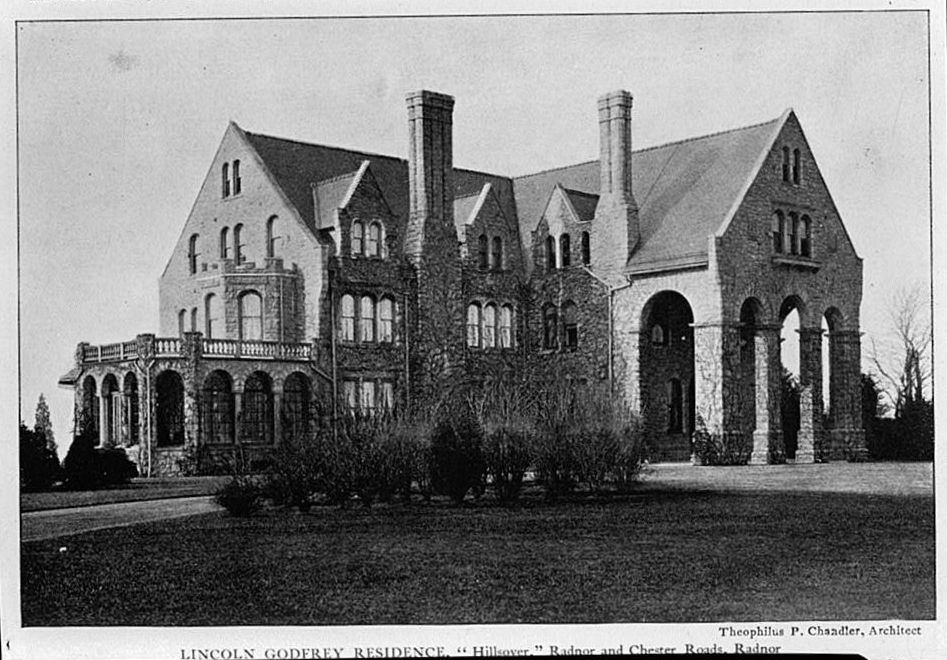
"Hillsover" (Lincoln Godfrey mansion), Radnor, Pennsylvania (1893), now the Academy of Notre Dame de Namur.

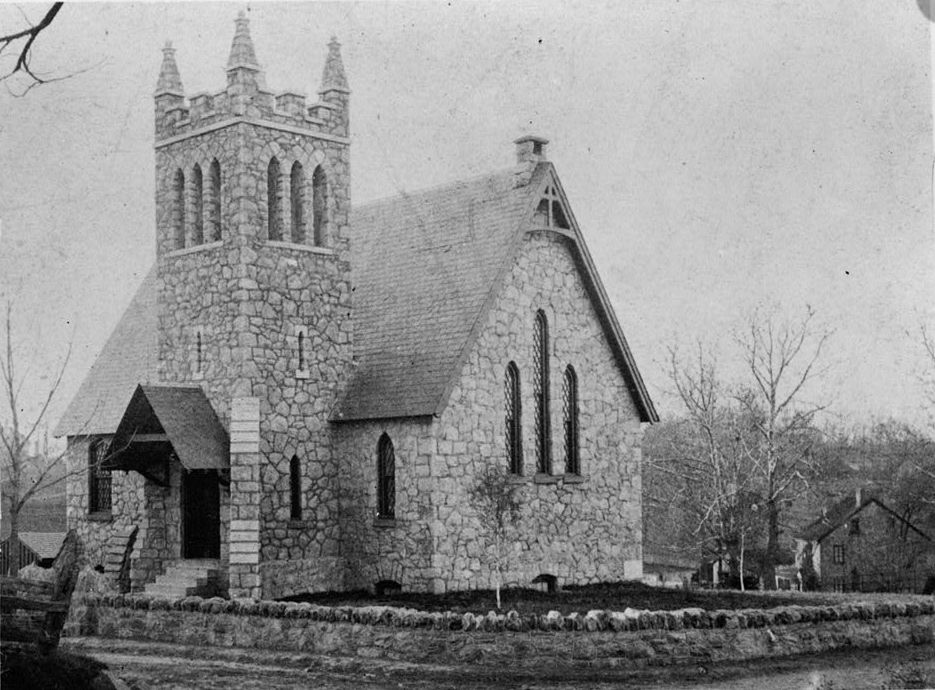
Church of St. Martin, Radnor, Pennsylvania (1894)

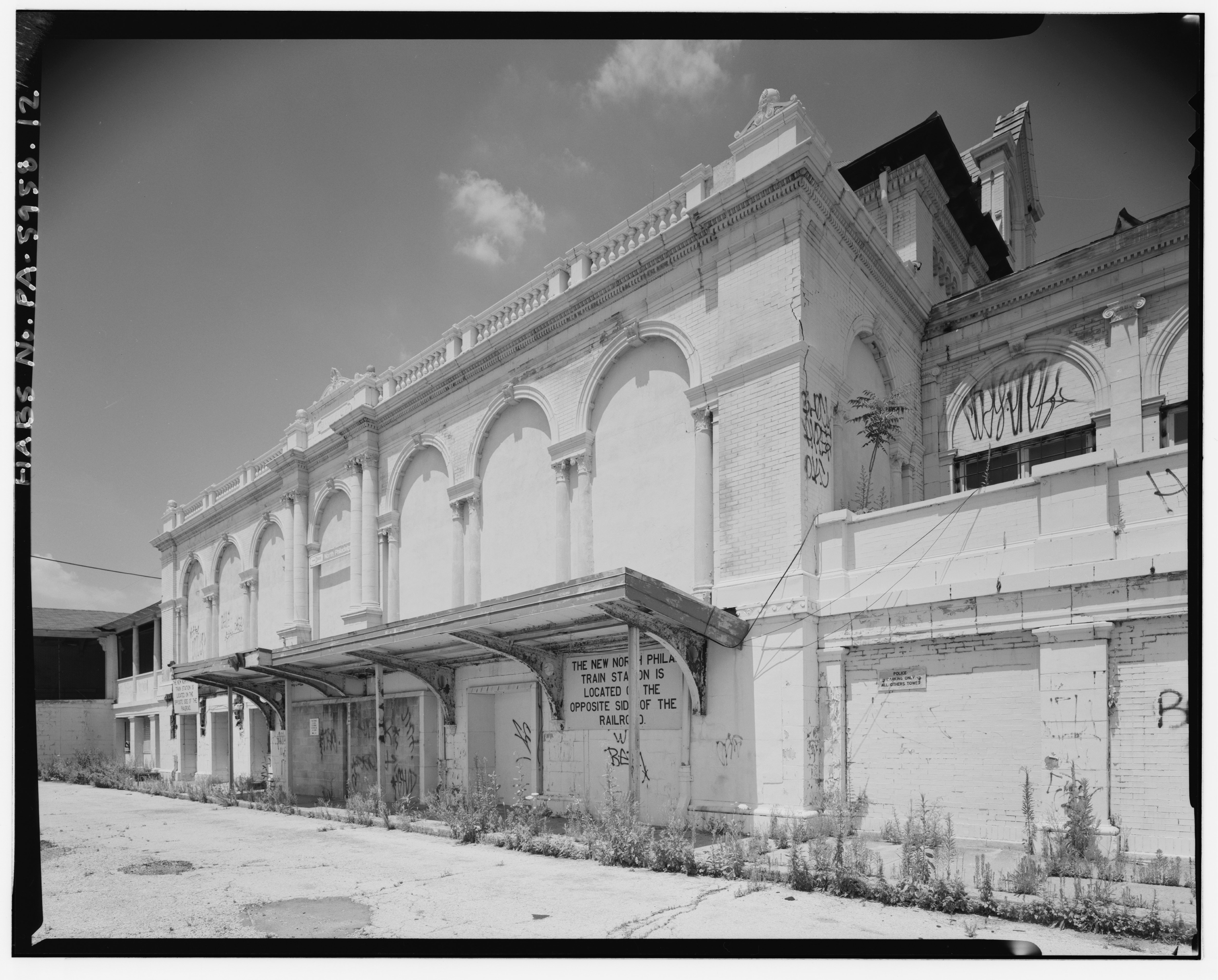
North Philadelphia Station (Germantown Junction), Pennsylvania Railroad (1896-1901)

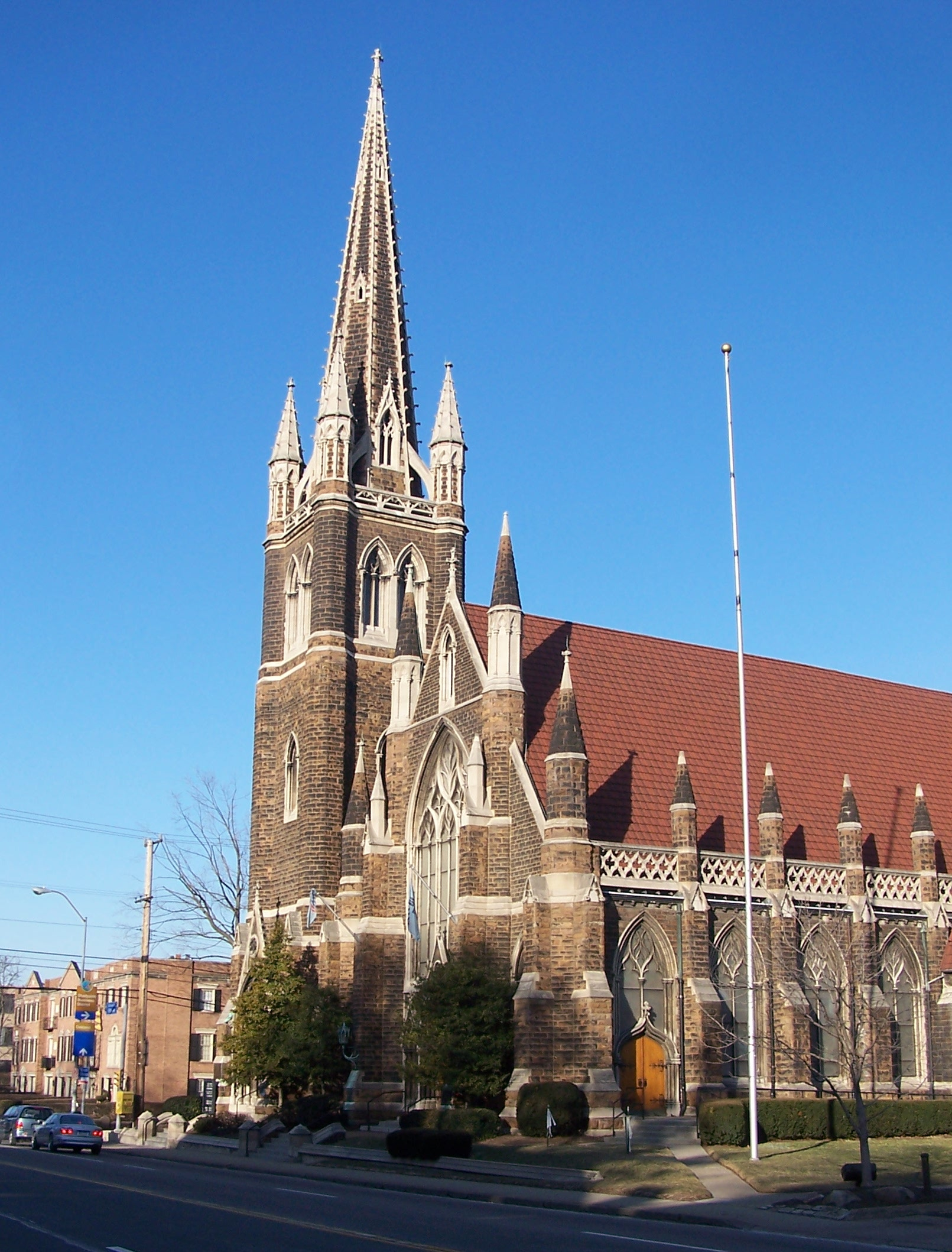
Third Presbyterian Church, Pittsburgh (1897-1903). Nickname: "Mrs. Thaw's Chocolate Church."

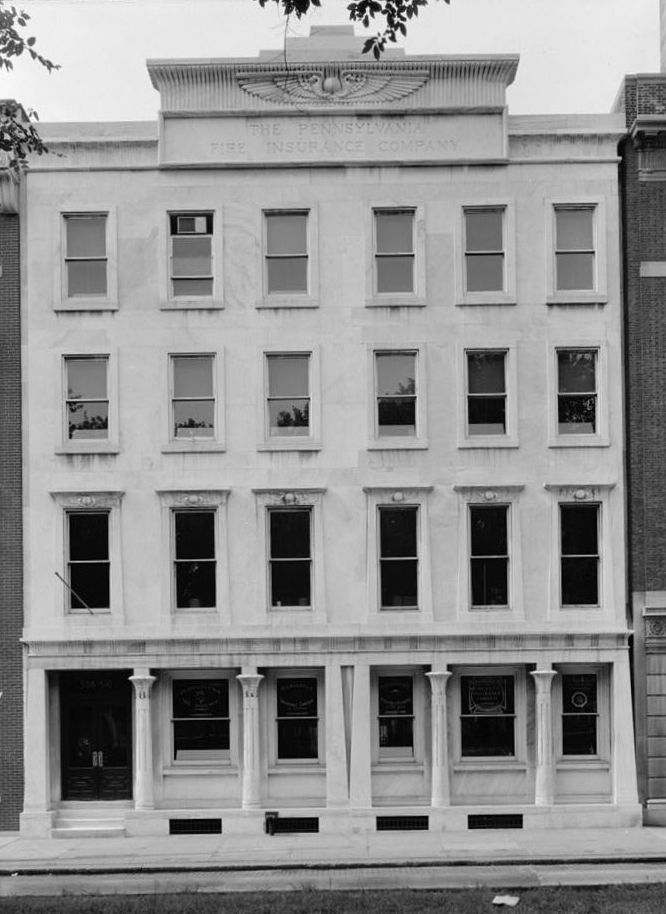
Pennsylvania Fire Insurance Company, Philadelphia. The left half of the façade was designed by John Haviland in 1838; Chandler designed the right half and the central parapet in 1902.

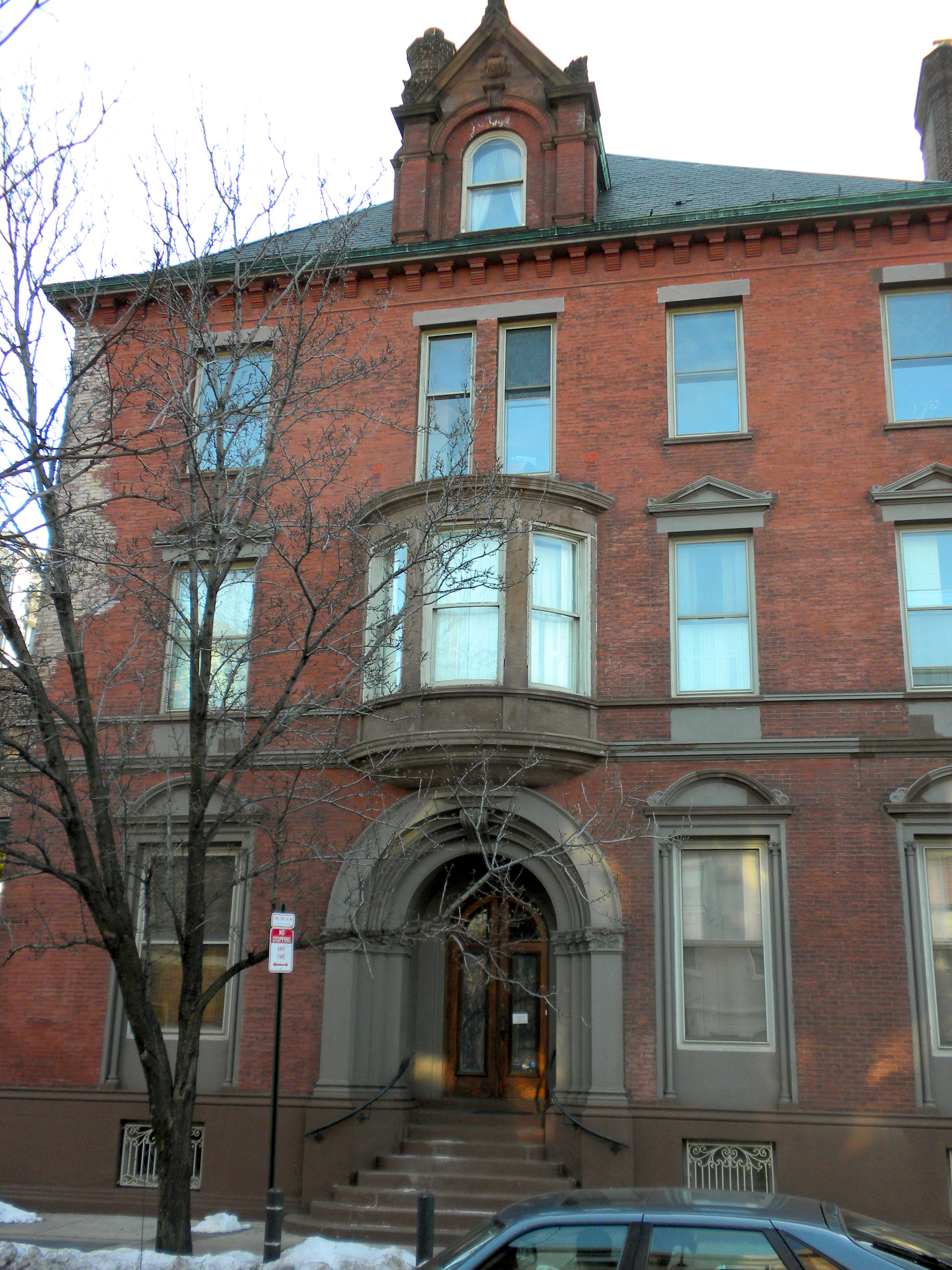
Bishop Mackay-Smith House, Philadelphia (1903–04)

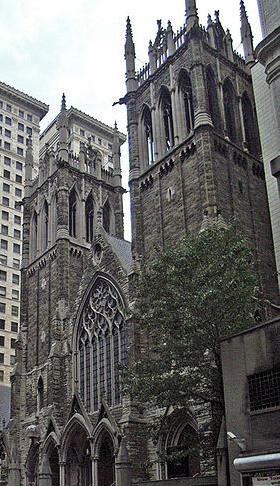
First Presbyterian Church, Pittsburgh (1903–05)

== See also ==
- Frank Furness
