= Stirling (Reading, Pennsylvania) =

Historic house in Pennsylvania, United States

- U.S. National Register of Historic Places
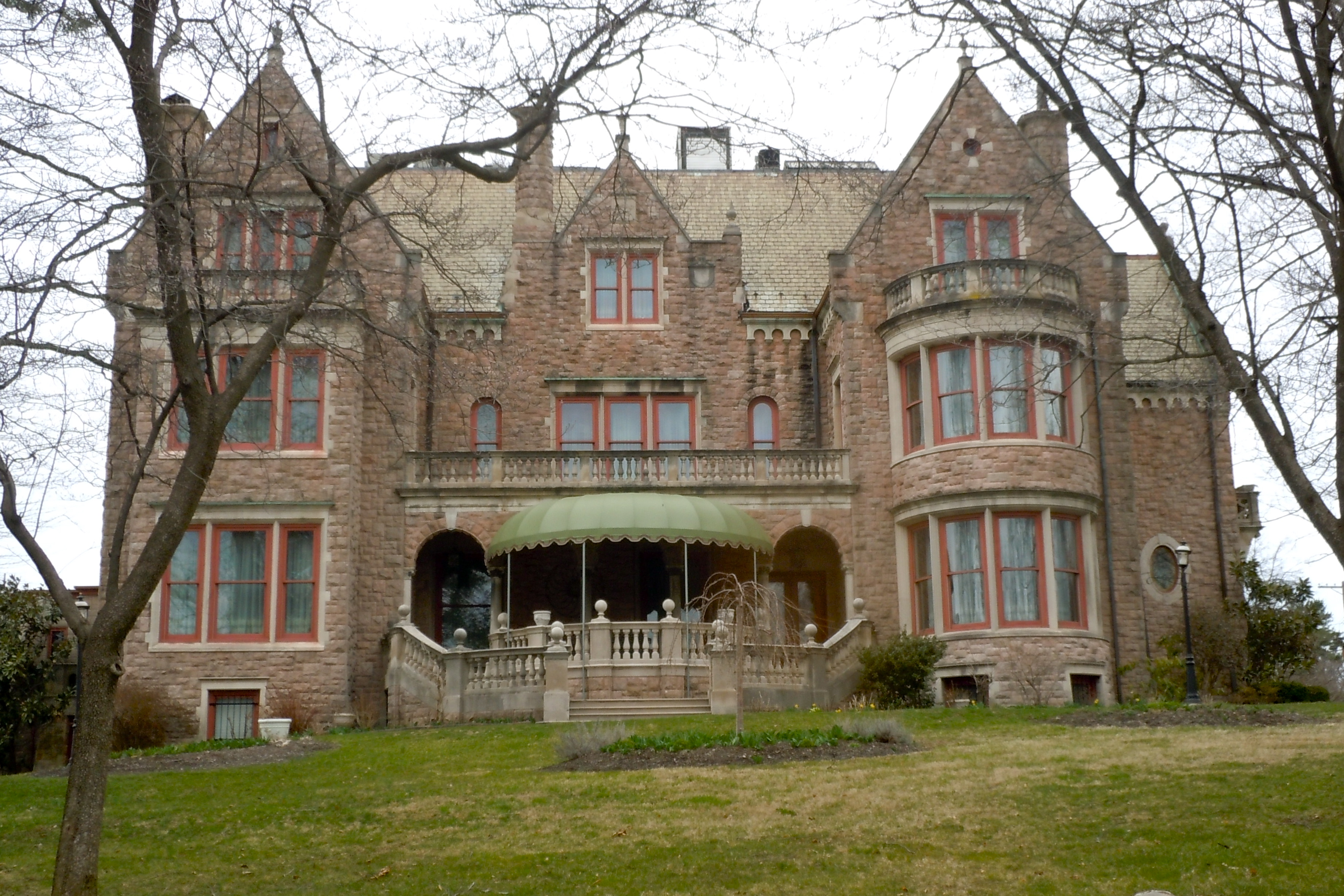
- Stirling, March 2011

- Location within Pennsylvania Location within the United States
- Location: 1120 Centre Ave., Reading, Pennsylvania
- Coordinates: 40°21′9″N 75°56′3″W
- Area: 0.5 acres (0.20 ha)
- Built: 1890-92
- Architect: Theophilus P. Chandler Jr.
- Architectural style: Late Victorian, Renaissance, Gothic Revival
- NRHP reference No.: 80003427
- Added to NRHP: April 17, 1980

Stirling is an historic mansion that is located at 1120 Centre Avenue in Reading, Berks County, Pennsylvania, United States.

It was listed on the National Register of Historic Places in 1980.

== History and architectural features ==
Built between 1890 and 1892, this historic residence is a three-story, twenty-four-room, Châteauesque-style dwelling that was designed by noted Philadelphia architect Theophilus Parsons Chandler Jr. (1845–1928).

Created for industrialist James Hervey Sternbergh (1834–1913), the owner of the American Steel & Iron Manufacturing Company, and his second wife, it was named after Stirling Castle in Scotland and was built using squared granite ashlar. Located at 1120 Centre Avenue in Reading, Pennsylvania, it features a number of eclectic decorative elements including tall chimneys with decorated caps, a balustraded verandah, steeply pitched gable roofs, and roof dormers.

During the 1930s, Stirling served as the setting for high teas, salons and other society events that were hosted by James Sternbergh's widow.

Following the death of James H. Sternbergh, ownership of the mansion and a significant portion of his wealth were transferred to his widow; following her death, the mansion and much of the family's remaining fortune were inherited by their youngest daughter, Gertrude Sternbergh (1899–1996). A classically trained concert pianist and graduate of the Juilliard School of Music, Gertrude Sternbergh also became one of the first women in Berks County, Pennsylvania to become a licensed airplane pilot and was a well-known patron of artists, authors and musicians across and beyond the Commonwealth of Pennsylvania. Among her beneficiaries and friends were American pianist Andre Watts and Metropolitan Opera star Jerome Hines. A soloist with the Reading Symphony Orchestra between 1924 and 1971, she frequently held fundraisers for the ensemble on the grounds of the estate. Through her support and the support of her friends, the ensemble was able to recruit a significant number of Philadelphia Orchestra members during the early phases of their careers to serve as the RSO's principal section chairs during the twentieth century, enabling the RSO to achieve prominence as an ensemble that was respected in its own right.

== Present day ==
Stirling is now operated as a bed and breakfast.
