= Trinity Episcopal Church (Wilmington, Delaware) =

Historic church in Delaware, United States

- U.S. National Register of Historic Places
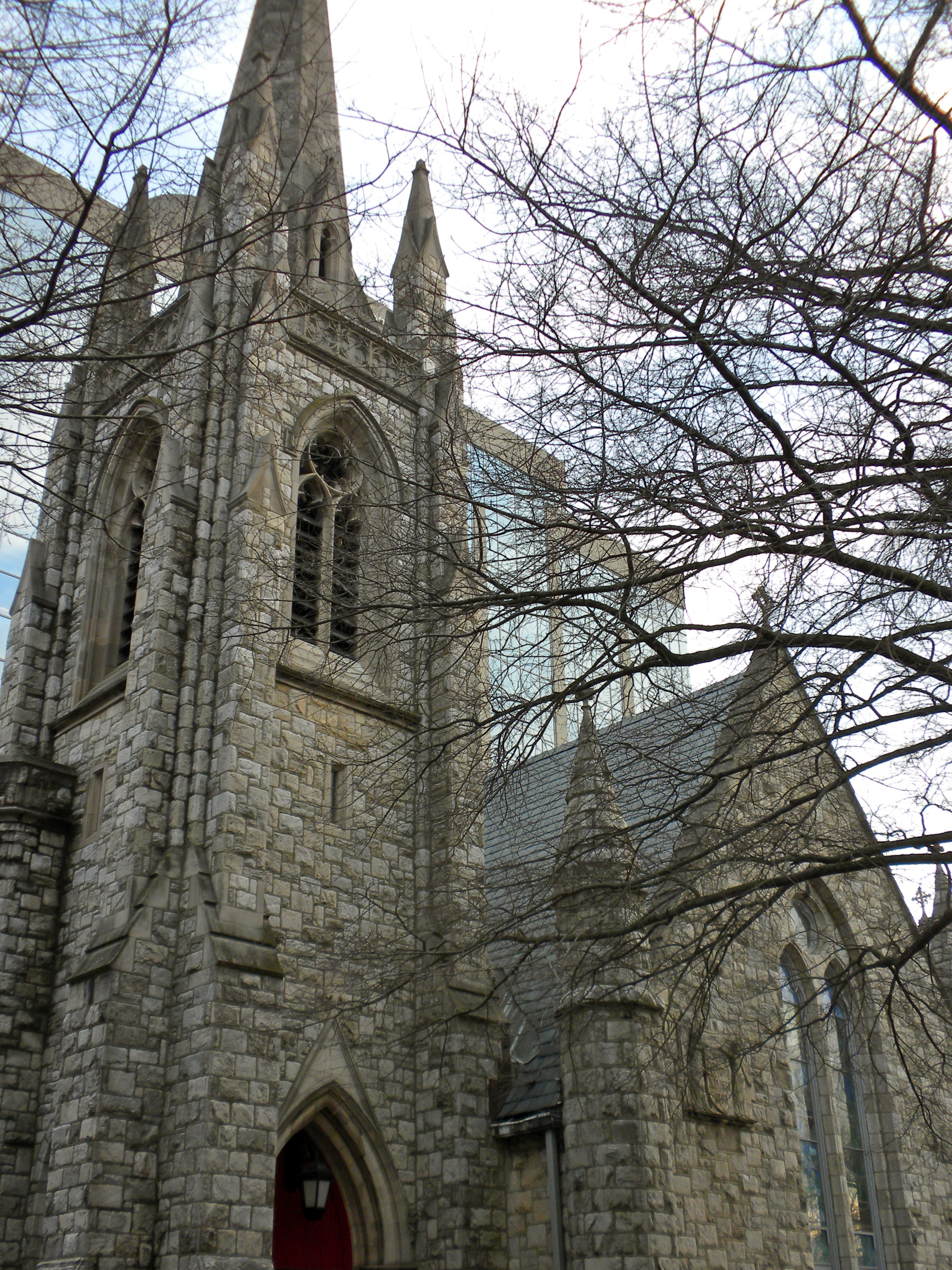
- Trinity Episcopal Church, January 2010

- Location within Delaware Location within the United States
- Location: 1108 N. Adams St., Wilmington, Delaware
- Coordinates: 39.750309°N 75.554691°W
- Area: 1 acre (0.40 ha)
- Built: 1890
- Architect: Theophilus P. Chandler (Church); Frank Miles Day (Parish House and Rectory)
- Architectural style: Gothic Revival
- NRHP reference No.: 84000855
- Added to NRHP: August 16, 1984

Trinity Episcopal Church is a historic Episcopal church located at 1108 N. Adams Street in Wilmington, New Castle County, Delaware. It was designed by architect Theophilus P. Chandler, and built in 1890. It is constructed of grayish white "Avondale" limestone laid in random coursed rock-faced ashlar blocks in the Gothic Revival style. It features pointed arch windows and doors, a high spire, the additional pinnacles on the side of the building, and buttresses. The parish house and rectory were added to the church in 1911 and the chapel was added in 1949. An adjacent brick three story rowhouse, known as Harris House, is attached to the complex by a second story walkway.

It was added to the National Register of Historic Places in 1984.

Trinity Parish operates two church buildings in Wilmington, both listed by the NRHP: the main building on North Adams, and Holy Trinity Church (Old Swedes), built in 1699, at East 7th and Church Streets.
