= Church of the New Jerusalem (Philadelphia) =

Swedenborgian church in Pennsylvania, US

Coordinates: 39.9527°N 75.1766°W

The Church of the New Jerusalem
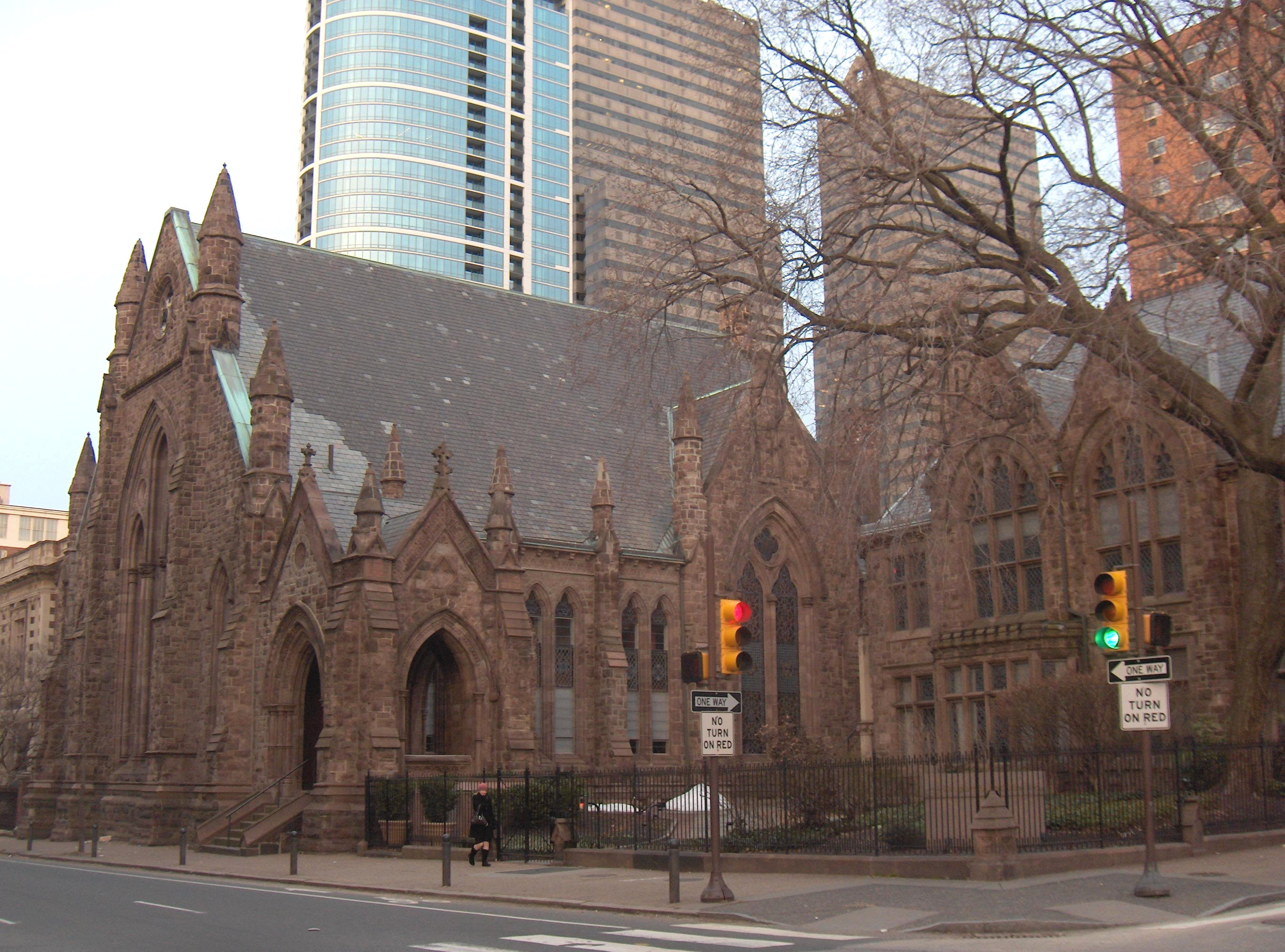
- View from South-West corner, 22nd and Chestnut Streets

General information
- Location: 2109 Chestnut St. Philadelphia, Pennsylvania, United States
- Completed: 1881
- Client: The New Church

Technical details
- Structural system: Masonry

Design and construction
- Architect: Theophilus Parsons Chandler

The Church of the New Jerusalem was a former nineteenth-century Swedenborgian church located in downtown Philadelphia, Pennsylvania, at 22nd and Chestnut Streets.

The church was erected in 1881 to designs by Theophilus Parsons Chandler. When the congregation diminished, the church closed in the mid-1980s, and the structure was reused in 1989 as office space. The National Trust for Historic Preservation profiled the structure as a good example of adaptive reuse: "The congregation worked closely with the buyer of the property, the Preservation Fund, and the Philadelphia Historical Commission to devise a design that would be sensitive to the historic fabric." The project "added two floors for office space and enclosed the interior space facing the chancel with a floor to- ceiling glass wall. Updated HVAC, electrical systems, and emergency equipment installed." "In an area of many churches, the successful conversion to office space was a welcome sight for many of the neighbors who had feared an abandoned church building."

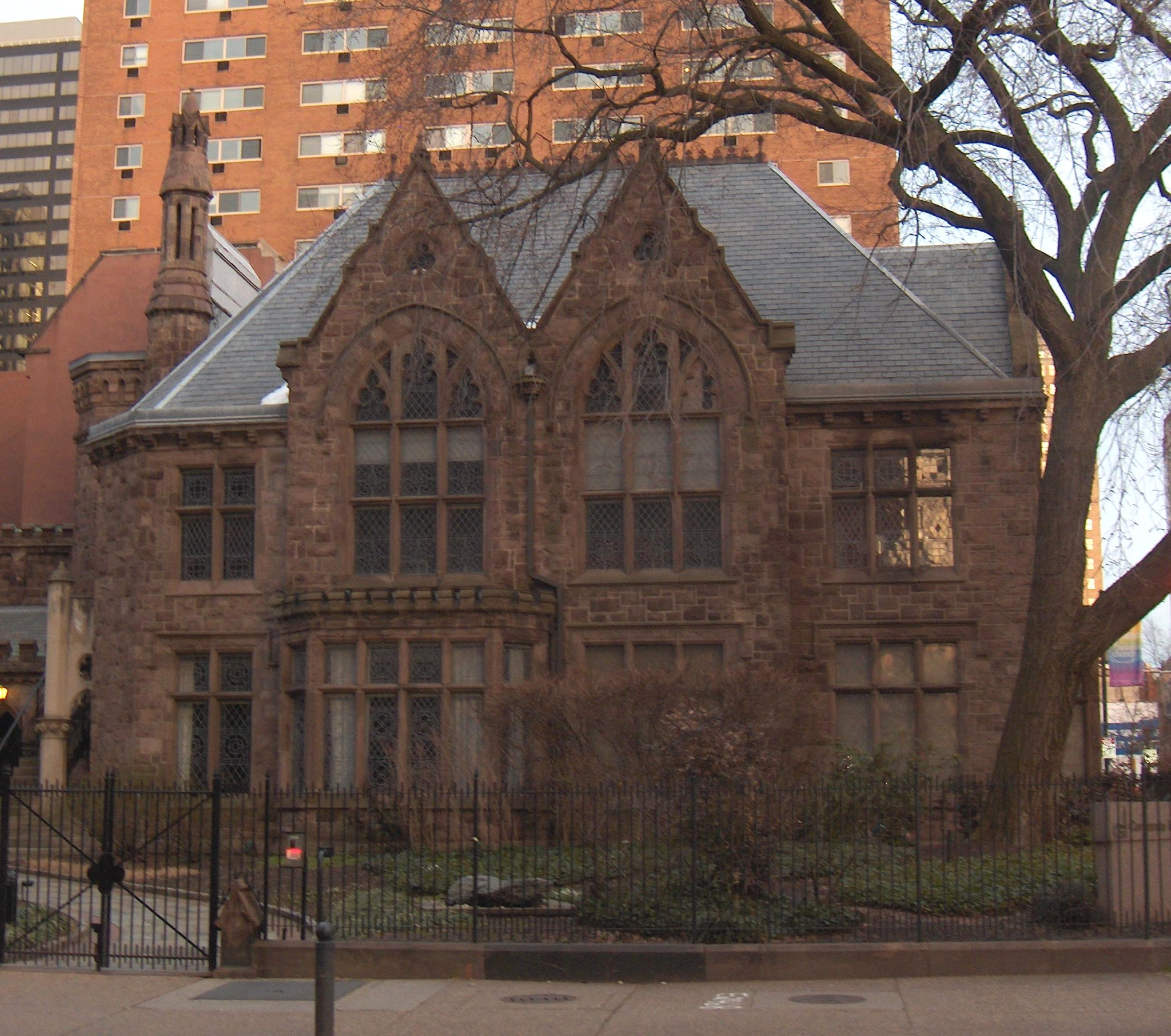
Church house on Chestnut Street

The 1990 conversion by Mark B. Thompson Associates into 24,000 square feet (2,200 m^{2}) of executive office space with room for expansion for Graduate Health System Corporate Headquarters, and later occupied by the advertising agency The Weightman Group, which is also gone. "Two balconies were added in four of the six bays, leaving the altar area an unchanged space for reception. A glass curtain wall was inserted in the interior to define the space and keep noise down. Additionally, a large spiral staircase and an elevator were placed to give access to all levels."

In 2005, the church was purchased by local Knoll office furniture dealer Corporate Facilities, Inc. to use as its headquarters. The company was located there until the pandemic shut down the city in March 2020.

The College of Physicians of Philadelphia bought the property in 2023 and announced in 2025 that it would expand into the building.
