= Bishop Mackay-Smith House =

Historic house in Pennsylvania, United States

- U.S. National Register of Historic Places
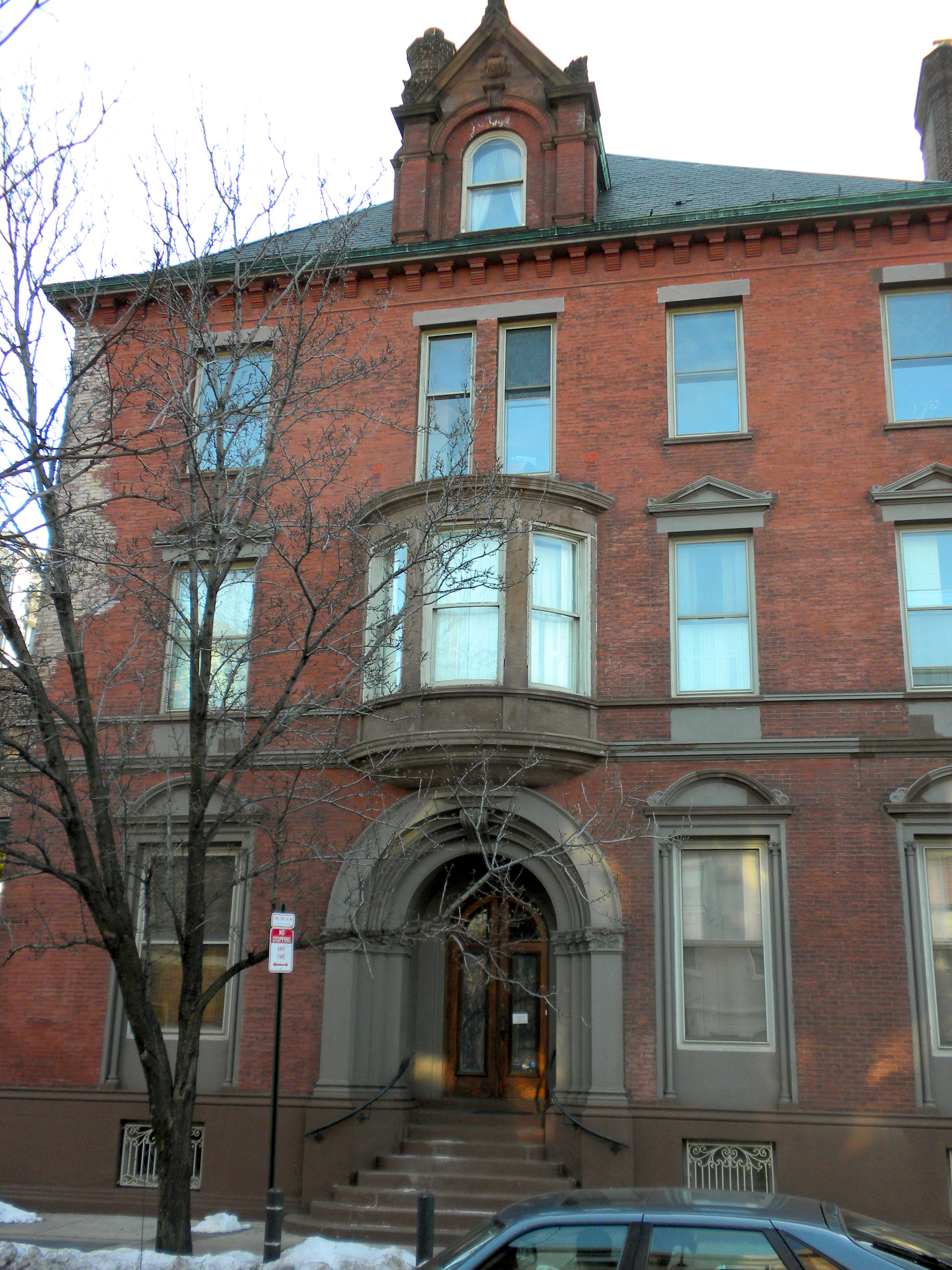
- Bishop Mackay-Smith House, February 2010

- Location within Philadelphia Location within Pennsylvania Location within the United States
- Location: 251 S. 22nd St., Philadelphia, Pennsylvania
- Coordinates: 39°56′57″N 75°10′40″W
- Area: 0.3 acres (0.12 ha)
- Built: 1903–1904
- Built by: Williams, Arthur H. & Sons
- Architect: Theophilus P. Chandler Jr.
- NRHP reference No.: 80003608
- Added to NRHP: January 25, 1980

Bishop Mackay-Smith House, also known as the Franklin School, is a historic residence located in the Rittenhouse Square West neighborhood of Philadelphia, Pennsylvania. It was built in 1903–1904, and is a 3 1/2-story, brick and brownstone building. It has a flat, square facade front with a deep entry porch. It was designed by noted Philadelphia architect Theophilus Parsons Chandler Jr. (1845–1928). It was built for Alexander Mackay-Smith, Bishop of Pennsylvania in 1911. He served as Coadjutor Bishop from 1902 to 1911.

The house was added to the National Register of Historic Places in 1980.
