= List of German-language newspapers published in the United States =

Illinois Staats-Zeitung's 1871 building in Chicago, one of the largest German language newspapers in the 19th century

In the period from the 1830s until the First World War, dozens of German-language newspapers were published in the United States. Although the first German immigrants had arrived by 1700, most German-language newspapers flourished during the era of mass immigration from Germany that began in the 1820s.

Germans were the first non-English speakers to publish newspapers in the U.S., and by 1890, over 1,000 German-language newspapers were being published in the United States. The first German language paper was Die Philadelphische Zeitung, published by Benjamin Franklin in Philadelphia beginning in 1732; it failed after a year. In 1739, Christopher Sauer established Der Hoch-Deutsche Pennsylvanische Geschicht-Schreiber, later known as Die Germantauner Zeitung. It was one of the most influential pre-Revolutionary weekly newspapers in the colonies. By 1802, Pennsylvanian Germans published newspapers not only in Philadelphia, but also in Lancaster, Reading, Easton, Harrisburg, York, and Norristown. The oldest German Catholic newspaper, the Cincinnati Archdiocese's Der Wahrheitsfreund, began publishing in 1837. By 1881, it was one of five German papers in the Cincinnati market.

The newspapers were hit by two rounds of closures due to sudden drops in advertising revenue. As the U.S. entered World War I, many advertisers stopped placing advertisements in German newspapers. Later, with the onset of Prohibition in 1920, the remaining newspapers faded, as older generations died and newer generations chose not to embrace a German-American identity, with Americanization. A few American newspapers in the German language remain extant today.

== Current ==
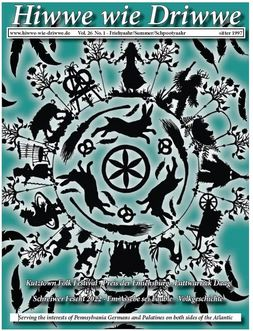
Hiwwe wie Driwwe

=== California ===
- Neue Presse USA, Hemet, 1986–present

=== Florida ===
- Florida Sun, Orlando

=== New York ===
- New Yorker Staats-Zeitung, New York, 1834–present

=== Pennsylvania ===
- Amerika Woche, Gladwyne, 1956–present
- Hiwwe wie Driwwe, Kutztown, 1997–present (written in the Pennsylvania German dialect)

== Defunct ==
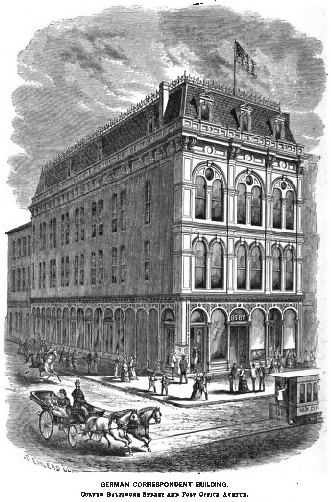
The building of Der Deutsche Correspondent in Baltimore

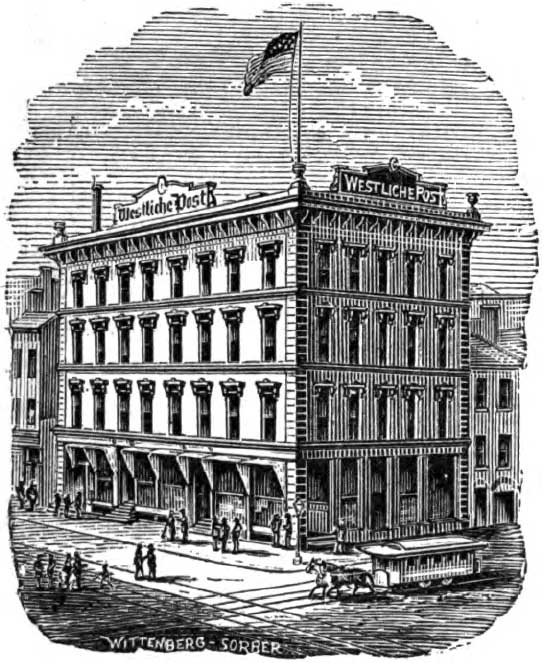
The 1874 building of the St. Louis Westliche Post

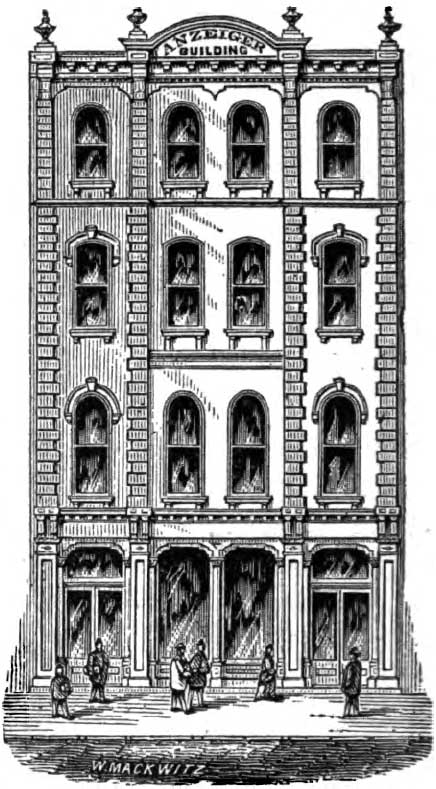
The building of the St. Louis Anzeiger des Westens in 1887

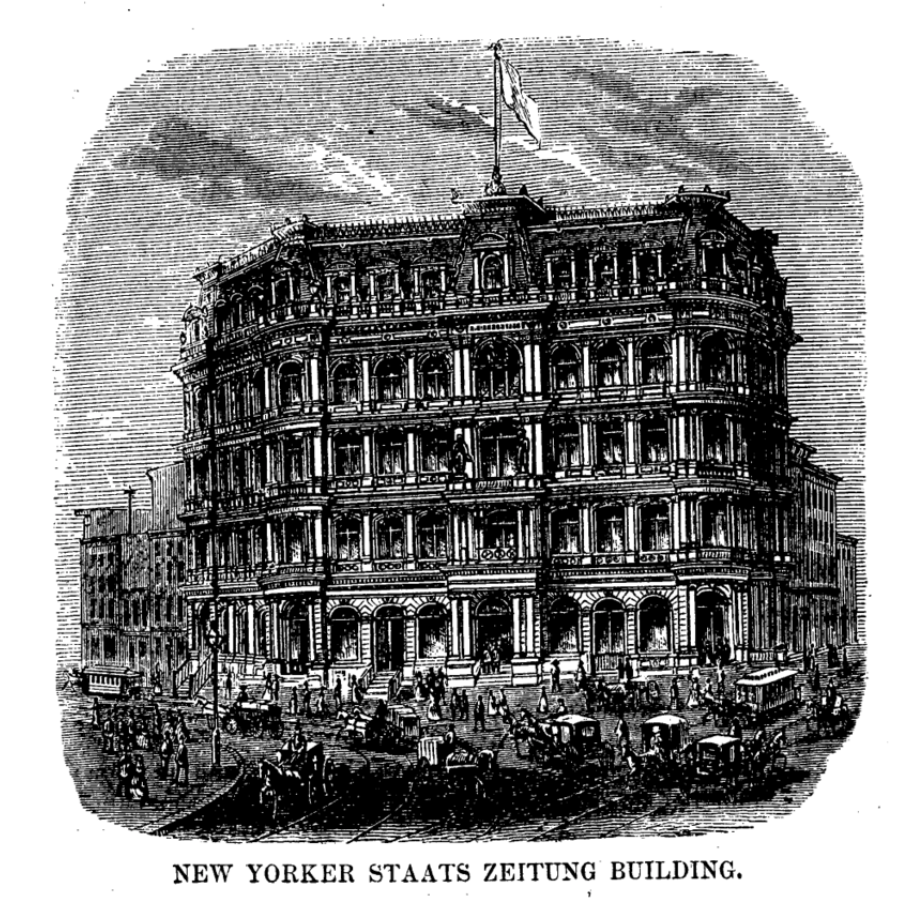
The New Yorker Staats-Zeitung's 1873 building

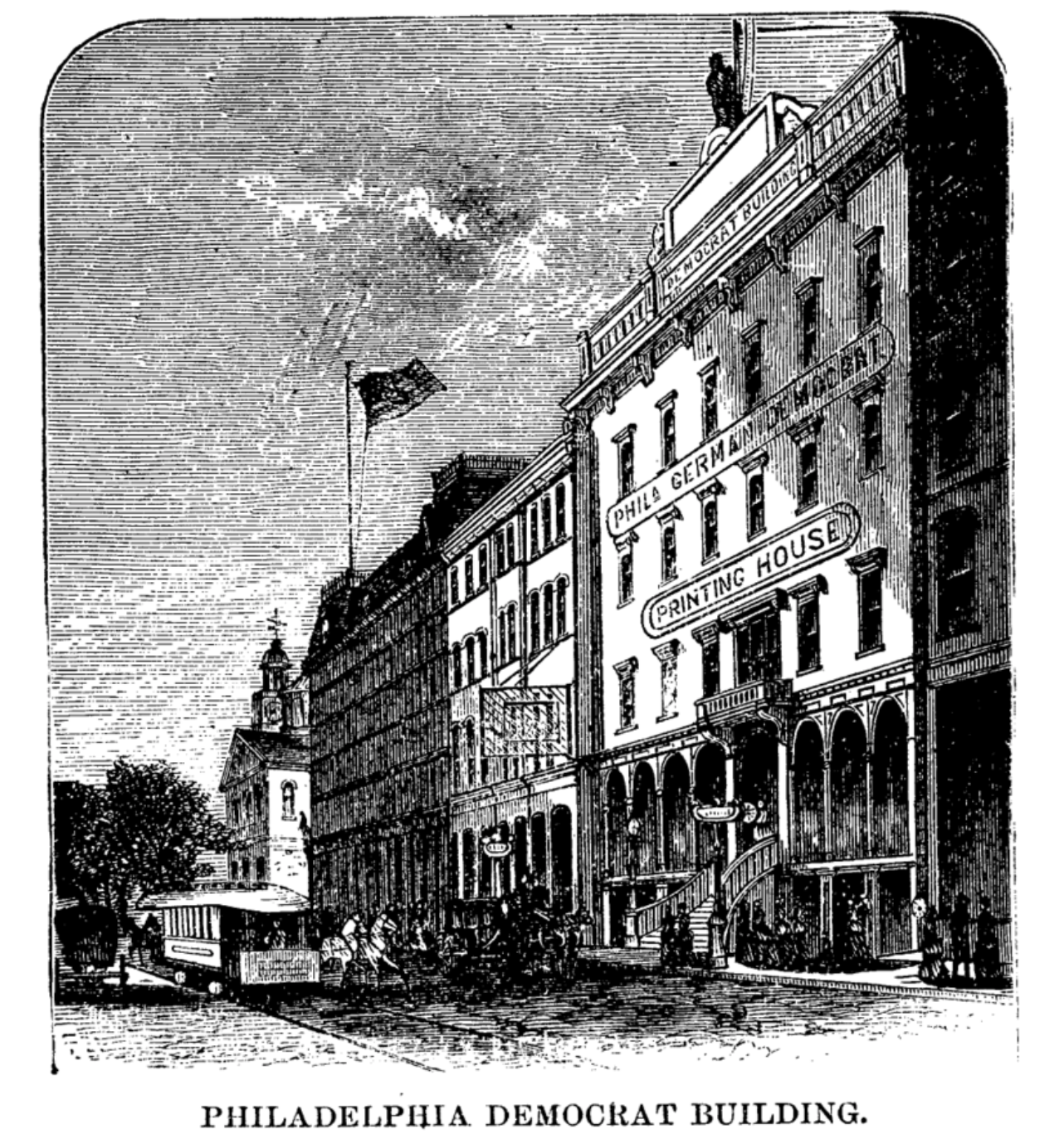
The 1868 building of the Philadelphia Demokrat

=== Arkansas ===
- Arkansas Freie Presse, Little Rock, 1874–1876
- Das Arkansas Echo, 1891–1932
- Stuttgart Germania, Stuttgart, 1895
- Die Arkansas Staatszeitung, 1869–1917

=== California ===
- California Staats-Zeitung, San Francisco, 1852–1918
- Republikaner, San Francisco, 1860
- San Francisco Abend Post, San Francisco, 1863–1864
- California Chronik, San Francisco, 1866
- Der Wecker, San Francisco, 1876–1878
- Süd-California Post, Los Angeles, 1887–1914
- San Francisco Tageblatt, San Francisco, 1898–1906

=== Colorado ===
- Die deutsche Presse des grossen Westens, Denver, 1870
- Die Deutsche Zeitung, Denver, 1871–1872
- Colorado Journal, Denver, 1872–1899
- Colorado Courier, Denver, 1873; 1882–1884
- Colorado Post, Denver, 1879–1880
- Sonntags Post, Denver, 1881–1883
- Colorado Staats-Zeitung, Denver, 1882–1885
- Fidibus-Herold, Denver, 1883–1897
- Denver Figaro, Denver, 1883–1886
- Denver Freie Presse, Denver, 1887–1888
- Denver Volksblatt, Denver, 1887–1888
- Volksblatt, Pueblo, 1887–1888
- Colorado Freie Presse, Denver, 1891–1892
- Neue Welt, Denver, 1892–1894
- Pueblo Anzeiger, Pueblo, 1892–1896
- Silber-Glocken, Denver, 1895–1896
- Denver Discuverer, Denver, 1896–1898
- Ordensblatt der Harugari, Denver, 1896–1899
- Bote, Denver, 1897–1899
- Pueblo Freie Presse, Pueblo, 1897–1899
- Denver Posten, Denver, 1898–1901
- Odensblatt und Vereins Zeitung, Denver, 1899–1903
- Nachrichten, Pueblo, 1900–1901
- Colorado Herold, Denver, 1902–1947
- Colorado Vorwarts, Denver, 1903–1914
- Volkszeitung Tribune, Denver, 1955–after 1963

=== Connecticut ===
- Connecticut Republikaner, New Haven, 1867–1901
- Connecticut Freie-Presse, New Haven, 1875–1907
- New England Anzeiger, New Haven, 1876–1884
- Bridgeporter Zeitung, Bridgeport, 1877–1878
- Connecticut Staats-Zeitung, Hartford, 1883–1942
- New Haven Anzeiger, 1891–1910
- Waterbury Beobachter, Waterbury, 1898–1917
- Westporter Herald, Westport, 1898–1951

=== Florida ===
- Florida Deutsches Echo, Miami, 1926–?

=== Illinois ===
- Illinois Staats-Zeitung, Chicago, 1848–1922
- Belleviller Zeitung, Belleville, 1849–1917
- Der Proletarier, Chicago, 1853
- Deutscher Anzeiger, Freeport, 1853–1917
- Illinois Staats Anzeiger, Springfield, 1859-1865
- Arbeiter-Zeitung, Chicago, 1877–1931
- Vorbote, Chicago, 1874–1924
- Bloomington Journal, Bloomington, 1877–1918
- Plattdeutsche Zeitung, Chicago, 1878–1881
- Die Fäckel, Chicago, 1879–1919
- Abendpost, Chicago, 1889–1950
- Abend Presse, Chicago, 1896–1913
- Eintracht, Chicago, 1922–2017

=== Iowa ===
- Iowa Tribüne, Burlington, 1861–1899
- Der Demokrat, Davenport, 1851–1918
- Ostfriesische Nachrichten, Dubuque, 1881–1971
- Le Mars Herold, Le Mars, 1884–1918

=== Kansas ===
- Kansas Staats-Anzeiger, Topeka, 1879–1915
- Kansas Telegraph, Atchison, 1880–1904
- Kansas Rundschau, La Crosse, 1897–1898
- Kingman County Telegraph, Kingman, 1906–1912

=== Louisiana ===
- Die Deutsche Zeitung, New Orleans, 1848–1907
- Die Glocke, New Orleans, 1848–1850
- Louisiana Zuschauer, Lafayette, 1849–?
- Louisiana Staatszeitung, New Orleans, 1850–1866, merged into Die Deutsche Zeitung
- Das Arbeiterblatt, New Orleans, 1850–1851
- Deutsche Courier No. 2, 1850–?
- Der Alligator, New Orleans, 1851–?
- Lafayetter Zeitung, Lafeyette, 1851–?
- Täglische New Orleans Journal, New Orleans, 1866–1867
- Täglische New Orleans Deutsche Presse, New Orleans, 1868–1869, merged into Die Deutsche Zeitung
- Der Familienfreund, 1869–1903
- Der Kinderfreund, 1872–1874
- Die Laterne, 1872–?
- Louisiana Deutsches Journal, 1876–1877
- Der Altenheimbote, 1892–1918
- Der Negerfreund, 1897–1947
- The Southern Lutheran, 1903–1917
- Neue Deutsche Zeitung, 1907–1917

=== Maryland ===
- Baltimore Wecker, Baltimore, 1851–1877
- Der Deutsche Correspondent, Baltimore, 1841–1918, merged into Baltimore Correspondent
- Bayrisches Wochenblatt, Baltimore, 1880–1919, merged into Baltimore Correspondent
- (Täglicher) Baltimore Correspondent, Baltimore, 1919–1976

=== Massachusetts ===
- Neu England Rundschau, Holyoke, 1884–1942
- New England Staaten Zeitung, Holyoke, 1875–1901

=== Michigan ===
- Nordamerikanische Wochenpost, Warren, 1854–2022

=== Minnesota ===
- Der Nordstern, St. Cloud, 1874–1931
- Minnesota Staats-Zeitung, St. Paul, 1858–1877
- Minnesota Volksblatt, St. Paul, 1861–1877
- Die Volkszeitung, St. Paul, 1877–1881
- Wöchentliche Volkszeitung, 1881–1921
- Tägliche Volkszeitung, 1881–1941

=== Missouri ===
- Anzeiger des Westens, St. Louis, 1835–1898
- Westliche Post, St. Louis, 1857–1938
- Mississippi Blätter, St. Louis, 1857–1932
- Hermanner Volksblatt, Hermann, c.1856–1928
- Kansas City Presse, Kansas City, 1883–1919
- Osage County Volksblatt, 1896–1917

=== Montana ===
- Montana Staats-Zeitung, 1886–1917

=== Nebraska ===
- Nebraska Staats-Zeitung, Nebraska City, 1861–1915
- Tägliche Omaha Tribüne, Omaha, 1879–1941
- Nebraska Staats-Anzeiger, Lincoln, 1880–1901
- Lincoln Freie Presse, Lincoln, 1884–1942

=== Nevada ===
- Nevada Staats-Zeitung, Virginia City, 1864–1875
- Nevada Pionier, 1864–1864
- Deutsche Union

=== New York ===
- Amerika Woche, New York City, 1999–present
- Buffalo Demokrat, Buffalo, 1848–1918
- Buffalo Freie Presse, Buffalo, 1860–1910
- Der Katholische Deutschamerikaner, 1910
- Neue Volks, New York City, 1932–1949
- Neue Volkszeitung, New York City, 1932–1949
- New-Yorker Abend-Zeitung, New York City, 1851–1874
- New Yorker Herold, New York City, 1880–1934
- New-Yorker Tages-Nachrichten, New York City, 1870–1896
- New Yorker Volkszeitung, New York City, 1878–1932
- Oneida Demokrat, Utica, 1855–1871
- Der Volksfreund, Buffalo, 1838–1943

=== North Dakota ===
- Der Staats Anzeiger, Bismarck, 1906–1945

=== Ohio ===
- Cincinnati Freie Presse, Cincinnati, 1872–1964
- (Tägliches) Cincinnati Volksblatt, Cincinnati, 1863–1919
- Cincinnati Volksfreund, Cincinnati, 1850–1908
- Hochwächter, Cincinnati, 1845–1849
- Der Wahrheitsfreund, Cincinnati, 1837–1907
- Ohio Waisenfreund
- Westliche Blätter, Cincinnati, 1865–1919
- Farm und Haus, Bluffton, 1902–1905

=== Pennsylvania ===
- Alte und neue Welt, Philadelphia, 1834–1844
- Die Germantauner Zeitung, 1739
- Philadelphia Demokrat, Philadelphia, 1838–1918
- Philadelphische Staatsbote, Philadelphia
- Die Philadelphische Zeitung, Philadelphia, 1732
- Die York Gazette, 1796
- Freiheits-Freund, Pittsburgh, 1834–1901
- Pittsburger Volksblatt, Pittsburgh, 1859–1901
- Volksblatt und Freiheits-Freund, Pittsburgh, 1901–1942

=== South Carolina ===
- Der Teutone, Charleston, 1844–?

=== South Dakota ===
- Dakota Freie Presse, Yankton, 1874–1954

=== Tennessee ===
- Die Stimme die Volk, Memphis, 1854–1860
- Die Anzeiger des Südens, Memphis, 1858–1876
- Die Neue Zeit, Memphis, 1862–187?
- Memphis Correspondent, Memphis, 1870-?
- Memphis Journal, Memphis, 1876–1878
- Nashviller Demokrat, Nashville, 1866–1871
- Tennessee Staatszeitung, Nashville, 1866–1869

=== Virginia ===
- Richmonder Anzeiger, Richmond, 1854-?
- Virginia Staats-Gazette, Richmond, 1870–1904

=== Washington DC ===
- Washington Journal, Washington DC, 1859–1999, merger with Amerika Woche

=== West Virginia ===
- Deutsche Zeitung, Wheeling, 1901–1916
- West Virginia patriot, Wheeling, 1916–191?
- West Virginische staats-zeitung, Wheeling, 1887–1901, formed by the merger of Deutsche zeitung (Wheeling, W. Va.: 1876) (non-extant), and Wheelinger volksblatt (non-extant).
- Wheelinger volksblatt, Wheeling, 1880–1887
- Virginische staats-zeitung / Virginia state gazette, Wheeling, 1848–1863, continued by West Virginia staats zeitung (non-extant)
- Der Arbeiter-Freund, Wheeling, 1865–1887, absorbed Patriot (Wheeling, W. Va.) (non-extant) and was continued by Deutsche Zeitung von West Virginien (non-extant).

=== Wisconsin ===
- Die Deutsche Frauen-Zeitung, Milwaukee, founded in 1852.
- Manitowoc Post, Manitowoc, 1881–1924
- Milwaukee Herold, Milwaukee, 1860–1931
- Nord Stern, La Crosse
- Der Nord-Westen, Manitowoc, 1860–1909
- Shawano County Wochenblatt, Shawano, 1885–1901
- Shawano County Volksbote-Wochenblatt, Shawano, 1897–1935
- Farm und Haus, Madison, 1898–1900

== National newspapers ==
- Amerika Woche, 1972–present
- Der Ruf, distributed to German POWs across the United States during World War II

== See also ==
- German American journalism
- German Americans
- List of German language newspapers of Ontario
