= Freie Presse =

Freie Presse (German for Free Press) is the name of several newspapers, including:

- Freie Presse (Saxony), published since 1963 in the Chemnitz region, Germany
- Freie Presse (Alsace), which existed from 1898 to 1960 in Alsace, France (a German region for some of that period)
- Neue Freie Presse, which existed from 1864 to 1939 in Vienna, Austria. It was a forerunner of today's Die Presse.
- Dakota Freie Presse, a German-language paper in North America, 1874–1954
- Cincinnatier Freie Presse, a German-language paper in Cincinnati, Ohio, 1874–1964
