= Der Wahrheitsfreund =

German-language Catholic newspaper

- Type: Weekly (Wednesdays)
- Format: 31 by 46 inches (79 cm × 117 cm)
- Owner: Roman Catholic Archdiocese of Cincinnati
- Publisher: Benziger Brothers
- Founded: 1837
- Language: German
- Ceased publication: 1907
- Headquarters: Cincinnati, Ohio, United States
- Circulation: 14,400 (1875)
- Sister newspapers: The Catholic Telegraph
- OCLC number: 631796295

Der Wahrheitsfreund or Der Wahrheits-Freund ("The Friend of Truth") was the first German language Catholic newspaper in the United States, and one of many German-language newspapers in Cincinnati, Ohio during the nineteenth century. It was published by the Roman Catholic Archdiocese of Cincinnati, and proceeds went to the St. Aloysius Orphan Society.

== History ==
At the time of the paper's first issue on July 20, 1837, the Diocese of Cincinnati covered the entirety of Ohio and its English-language weekly, The Catholic Telegraph, had circulated for several years. The Wahrheitsfreund's founder, vicar general John Henni, served as editor from its founding to his appointment as the first Bishop of Milwaukee in 1843. By 1875, the paper had 14,400 subscribers. In 1907, the Wahrheitsfreund merged with Rev. Joseph Jessing's Ohio Waisenfreund (Ohio Orphan's Friend).

== Notable people ==
=== Editors ===
- Most Rev. John Henni editor/publisher from 1837 to 1843
- John James Maximilian Oertel editor from 1844 to 1846
- Hermann Lehmann, publisher from 1846 to 1850
- Joseph A. Hemann publisher from September 1850 to December 1865
- H. Baumstark (c. 1877)

=== Writers ===
- Rev. Francis Xavier Pierz (1854–after 1862) – missionary to the Ottawa and Ojibwa

== See also ==
- Cincinnati Volksfreund
- Cincinnati Volksblatt
- Hochwächter, a Cincinnati newspaper critical of the Catholic church
- Cincinnatier Freie Presse
