= Der Volksfreund (disambiguation) =

Der Volksfreund (German for "The People's Friend") can refer to:

- Der Volksfreund, Buffalo, New York, United States
- Der Volksfreund, Luxembourg City, Luxembourg
- Trierischer Volksfreund, Trier, Germany
- Der Volksfreund, Brunn (now Brno), Austrian Empire
- Cincinnati Volksfreund, Cincinnati, Ohio, United States
- Süderländer Volksfreund, a publication of Lüdenscheider Nachrichten in Werdohl, Germany
- Der Volkfreund, a Yiddish weekly published by Joseph Selig Glick in Pittsburgh, Pennsylvania
