= Der Proletarier =

Der Proletarier may refer to:

- Der Proletarier (1853), a German language socialist weekly newspaper published from Chicago, United States
- Der Proletarier (1919), a weekly newspaper published in Luxembourg
