= Joseph A. Hemann House =

Historic house in Ohio, United States

- U.S. National Register of Historic Places
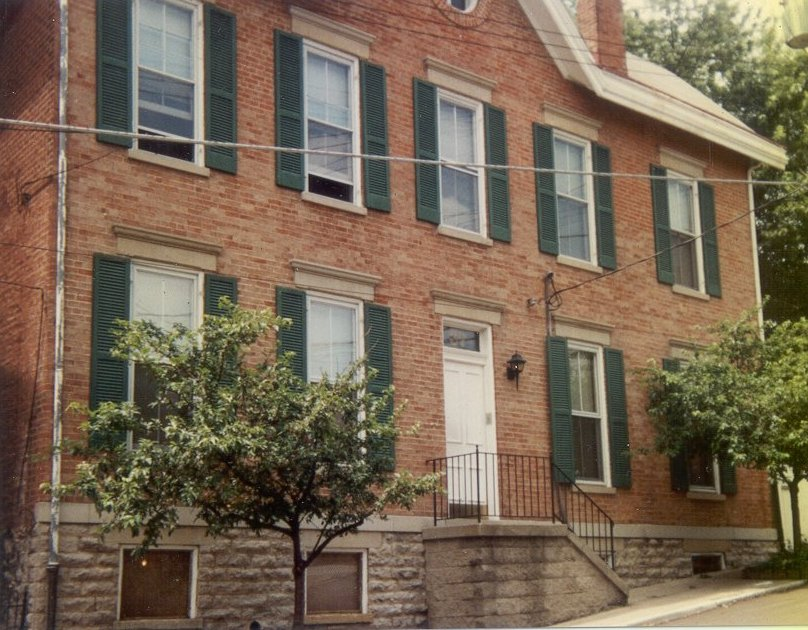
- Hemann House, 2004

- Location within Ohio Location within the United States
- Location: 49 W. McMillan St., Cincinnati, Ohio
- Coordinates: 39°7′38″N 84°30′51″W
- Area: less than one acre
- Built: 1870
- NRHP reference No.: 80003057
- Added to NRHP: April 16, 1980

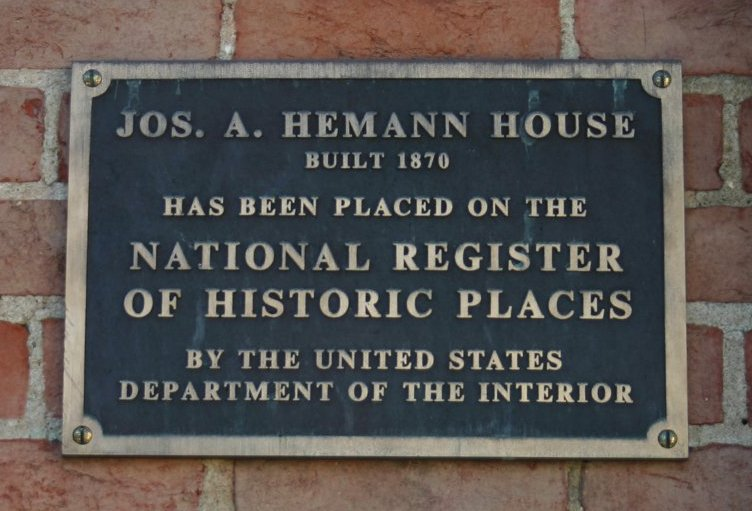
Hemann House Plaque

The Joseph A. Hemann House in Cincinnati, Ohio, was built in 1870 by Joseph A. Hemann (1816–1897) and served as his residence for about ten years. It is located in Hamilton County in the neighborhood of Clifton on the corner of West McMillan and Hollister. Mr. Hemann was the founder of the Cincinnati Volksfreund in 1850.

In April 1980, because the house represents a distinctive period in urban vernacular architecture, it was placed on the National Register of Historic Places (Listing Reference Number 80003057).
