= Nebraska Territory =

U.S. Territory (1854–1867)

Territory of Nebraska
- Organized incorporated territory of the United States
- 1854–1867
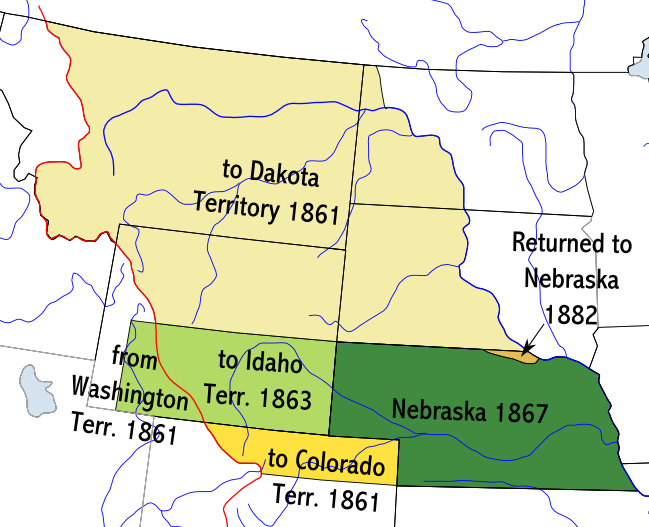
- Capital: Omaha
- Government
  - Type: Organized incorporated territory
- History
  - Kansas–Nebraska Act: May 30, 1854
  - Colorado Territory formed: February 28, 1861
  - Dakota Territory formed: March 2, 1861
  - Idaho Territory formed: March 3, 1863
  - Statehood: March 1, 1867
Preceded by
Unorganized territory
Washington Territory
Succeeded by
Colorado Territory
Dakota Territory
Idaho Territory
Nebraska

The Territory of Nebraska was an organized incorporated territory of the United States that existed from May 30, 1854, until March 1, 1867, when the final extent of the territory was admitted to the Union as the state of Nebraska. The Nebraska Territory was created by the Kansas–Nebraska Act of 1854. The territorial capital was Omaha. The territory encompassed areas of what is today Nebraska, Wyoming, South Dakota, North Dakota, Colorado, and Montana.

== History ==
Historical population
Year	Pop.	±%
1860	28,841	—
Source: 1860;

An enabling act was passed by the Congress of the United States in 1864. Delegates for a constitutional convention were elected; this convention did not produce a constitution. Two years later, in 1866, a constitution was drafted and voted upon. It was approved by 100 votes. However, a clause in this constitution that limited suffrage to "free white males" delayed Nebraska's entry into the Union for almost a year. The 1866 enabling act for the state was subject to a pocket veto by Democratic Party / War Democrat and new 17th President Andrew Johnson 1808–1875, served 1865–1869), When the Congress reconvened in 1867, it passed another bill to create the new 37th state of Nebraska, on the condition that Nebraska's new proposed first state constitution be amended to remove the suffrage clause. This bill was also vetoed by President Johnson. The then dominant Republican Party-controlled by Radical Republicans in the Congress, then overrode his veto, with the required two-thirds super majority..

=== Early settlement ===
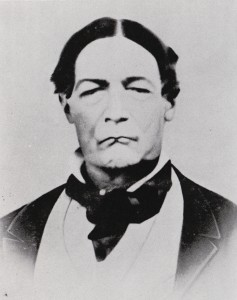
William Walker (1800–1874), a leader of the Wyandot people and a prominent citizen of early-day Kansas. Elected provisional Governor of the Nebraska Territory July 23, 1853.

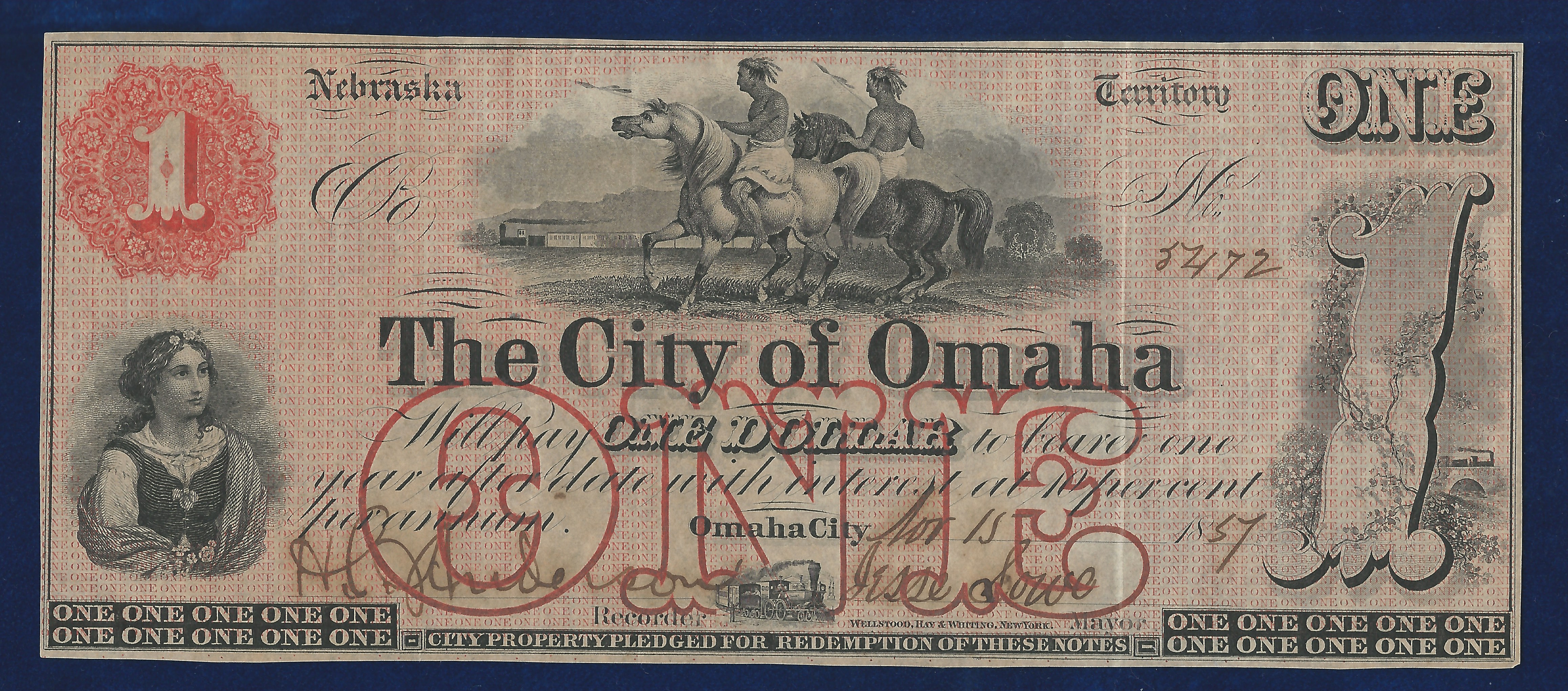
$1 City of Omaha 1857 uniface banknote. The note is signed by Jesse Lowe in his function as Mayor of Omaha City. It was issued as scrip in 1857 to help fund the erection of the territorial capitol building at Omaha.

Several trading posts, forts and towns were established in the previous area of the original Louisiana Purchase of 1803, and the organization of the subsequent Louisiana Territory (1804–1812) and the following Missouri Territory of 1812–1821 in the southeastern corner of the former larger territory. Later decades saw the new Western lands as temporarily unorganized federal territory between the Mississippi River in the east across the Great Plains to the far western Rocky Mountains. That status endured for 33 years from 1821 to the establishment of new official federal territories for Kansas Territory and the one further north in the Nebraska lands, both in 1854.

From the early 19th century through 1867, including Fontenelle's Post founded in the present-day site of Bellevue in 1806. It was first mentioned in fur trading records in 1823. Fort Lisa, founded by Manuel Lisa (1772–1820), (near present-day Dodge Park in North Omaha), was founded in 1812, although Lisa had earlier founded posts further up the upper Missouri River in future Dakota Territory (North Dakota) and Montana Territory (Montana). Fort Atkinson, was founded on the Council Bluff in 1819; in 1822 Cabanne's Trading Post was founded nearby on the Missouri River. Mormon (The Church of Jesus Christ of Latter-day Saints) settlers founded Cutler's Park in 1846, and the town of Bellevue was incorporated in 1853. Nearby Omaha City was founded in 1854, with Nebraska City and Kearney incorporated in 1855. The influential towns of Brownville and Fontanelle were founded that year as well. The early village of Lancaster, (later called and renamed Lincoln), was founded in 1856, along with the towns of Saratoga, South Nebraska City and Florence.

=== Early press ===
The first newspaper published in the terrain that would become Nebraska Territory and following 37th State of Nebraska, was a weekly military journal stationed at the United States Army post of Fort Atkinson that was published for five years, from 1822 to 1827, before the fort was closed. Thirty years later the Nebraska Territory was being settled and print media appeared serving the dual purposes of sharing the news and promoting the area for further settlement. In 1854, one of the first was the Nebraska Palladium (and Platte Valley Advocate). was the first newspaper to be printed / published in the territory; however, it would last less than a year. These territorial newspapers were efficient but rough and many of the papers folded under quickly changed owners, financial stability or consolidated with other publications. By 1860, the growing Nebraska Territory had twelve weekly publications, one biweekly and one monthly, with a combined circulation of 9,750. After statehood in 1867 the newspaper business expanded greatly.

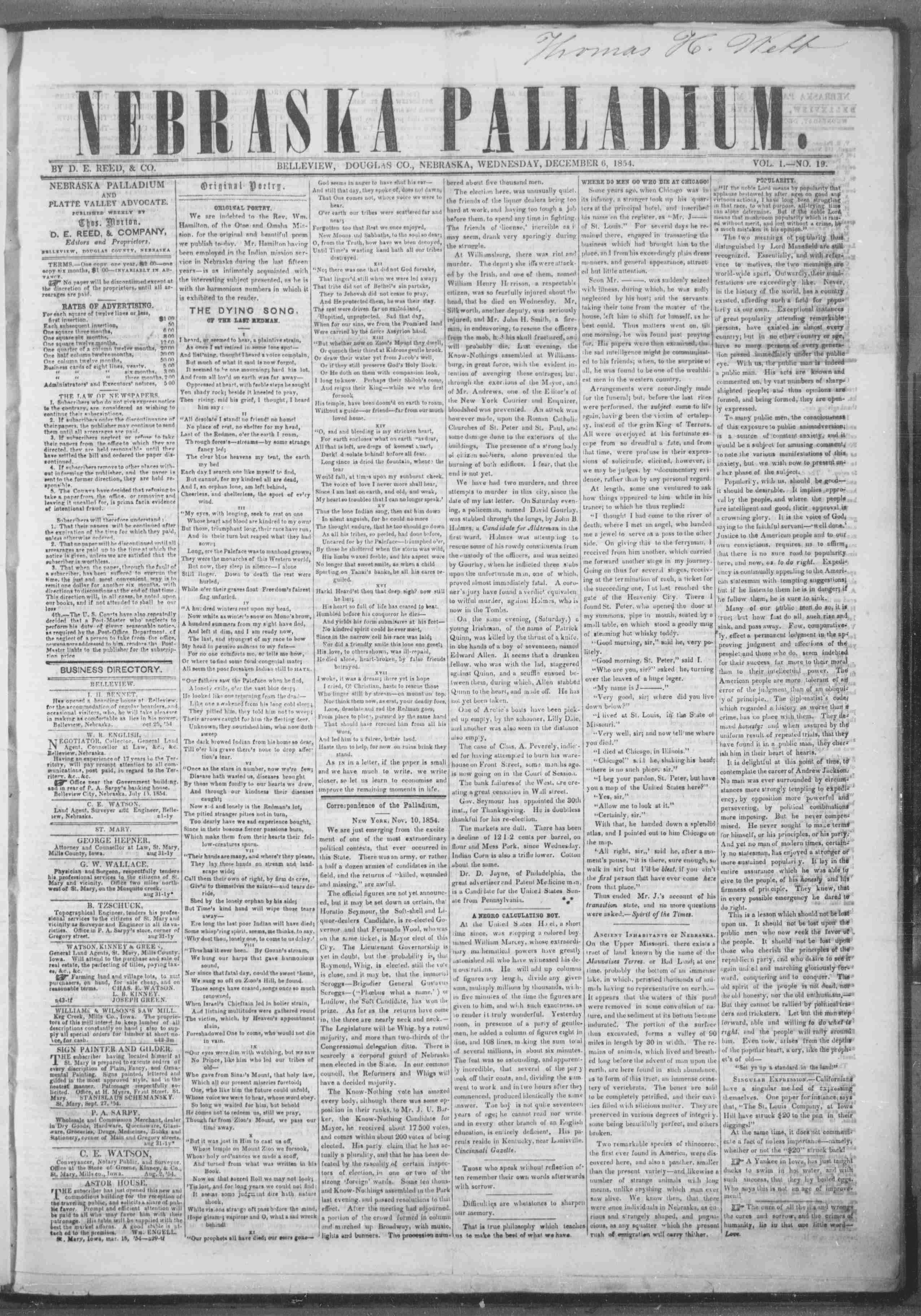
The front page of the December 6, 1854 issue of the Nebraska Palladium (and Platte Valley Advocate), the first newspaper to be published in the Nebraska Territory

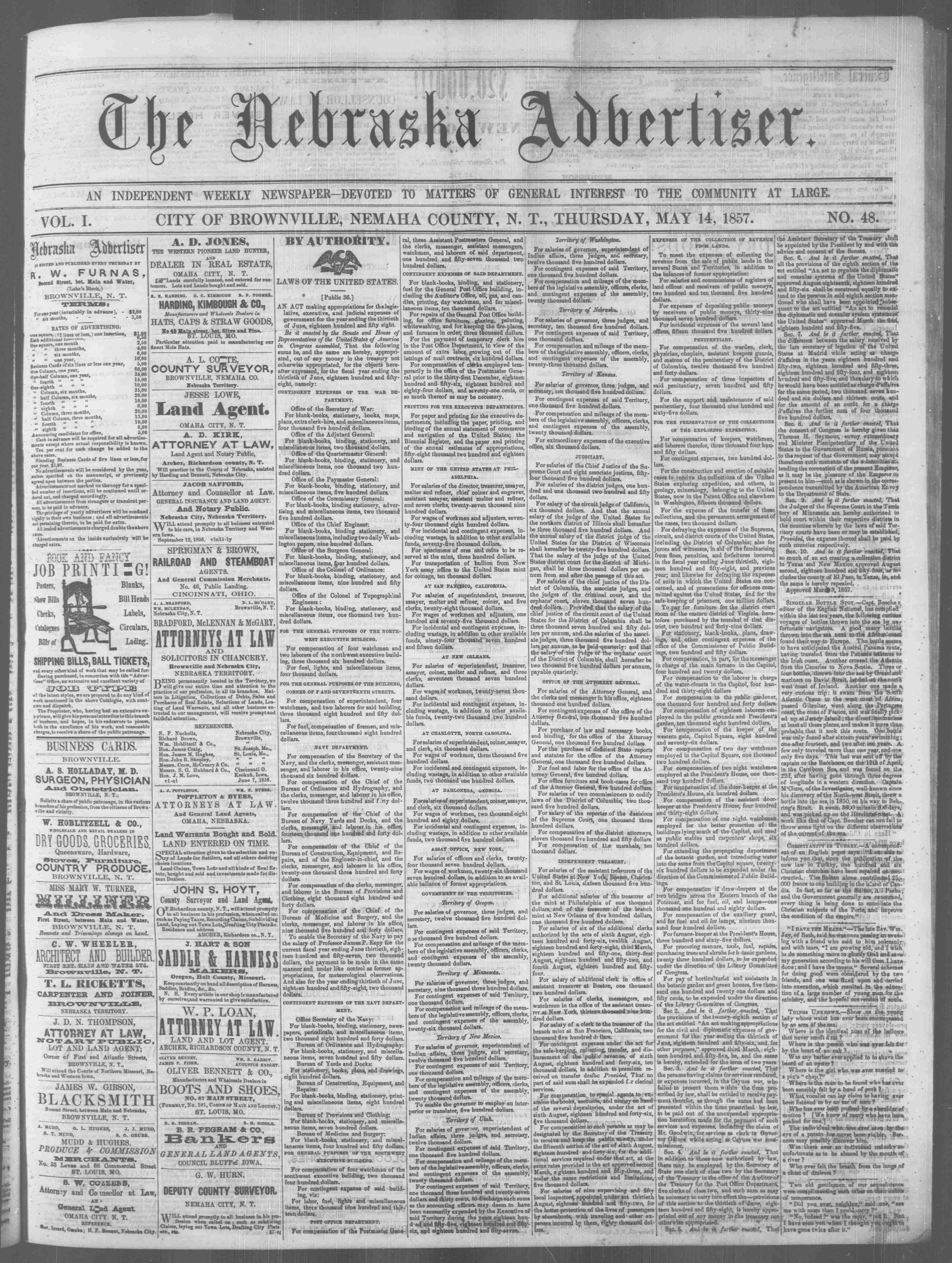
The front page of the May 4, 1857 issue of the Nebraska Advertiser founded by Robert Wilkinson Furnas, in Brownville, Nebraska Territory

Pioneer Print Media in the federal Nebraska Territory (1854–1867)
Name	Print period	Location	Notes
Nebraska Palladium and Platte Valley Advocate	July 15, 1854 –55	Bellevue, Nebraska Territory	Edited by Thomas Morton
Nebraskian	1854–64	Omaha, Nebraska Territory	
Bellevue gazette	October 23, 1856 – Oct. 1858	Bellevue, Nebraska Territory Douglas, Nebraska Territory	Published by S.A. Strickland & Co.
Dakota City Herald	July 15, 1857 –1860	Dakota City, Nebraska Territory	Published by John L. Dailey
Nebraska Advertiser	June 7, 1856 – July 16, 1909	Brownville, Nebraska Territory	Edited by Robert W. Furnas
Huntsman's Echo	1858–1861	Wood River, (Buffalo County), Nebraska Territory	Edited by Joseph E. Johnson, this paper was influential with Oregon Trail pioneers on wagon trains.
Nebraska Republican	1858	Omaha, Nebraska Territory	The first paper in the Territory to have mechanical presses, this was later succeeded by the Omaha Republican, and in 1871 absorbed the Omaha Tribune, (ancestor of the current Omaha World Herald).
Nebraska Farmer	1859	Brownville, Nebraska Territory	Edited by Robert W. Furnas the Farmer was the first agricultural publication in Nebraska Territory and continues to be one of the modern state's longest running journals
Peru Orchardist		Peru	
Daily Telegraph	1860	Omaha, Nebraska Territory	
Nebraska Deutsche Zeitung	1861	Nebraska City, Nebraska Territory	Published by Frank Renner, this German language paper was circulated nationally among German Americans and many copies even found their way back across the Atlantic Ocean to Europe in 19th century Germany with its various divided states in South Germany and the North German Confederation / Prussia. It is credited with bringing many European German settlers to the Territory.
Daily Herald	1865	Omaha, Nebraska Territory	Edited by George L. Miller, this paper was influential in bringing the transcontinental railroad of its eastern two-thirds of the line of the Union Pacific Railroad to Omaha for its eastern terminus . starting point in the 1860s. Another ancestor of the current major daily newspaper in the state's largest city and river port town, of the Omaha World Herald

=== Early military posts ===
With a variety of early fur trading posts, Fort Atkinson, founded in 1819, was the location of the first military post in what became the Nebraska Territory, as well as its first school. Other posts in the Nebraska Territory included Fort Kearny near present-day Kearney; Fort McPherson near present-day Maxwell; Fort Mitchell near present-day Scottsbluff; Fort Randall, in what is now South Dakota; and Fort Caspar, Fort Halleck, Fort Laramie, and Fort Sanders, in what is now Wyoming.

== Boundaries ==
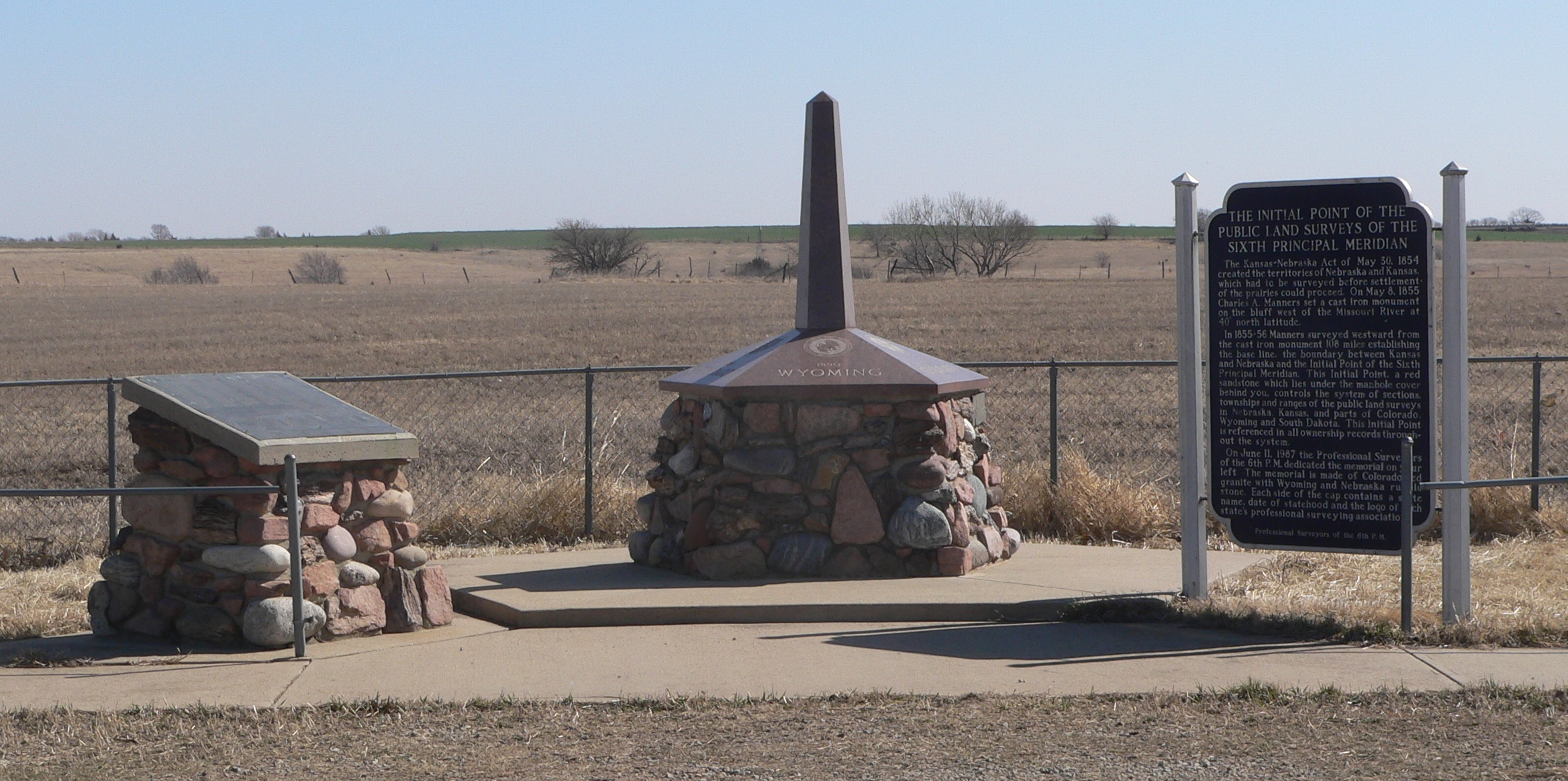
Site No. JF00-072: The Nebraska–Kansas state line at the intersection of Nebraska counties Thayer and Jefferson and Kansas counties Washington and Republic

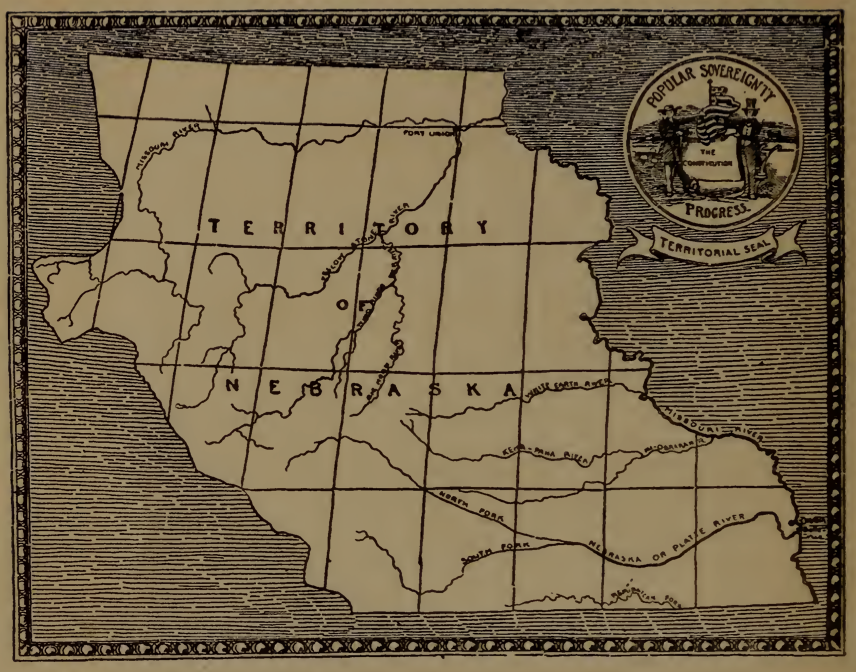
Map of the territory of Nebraska and seal of the Nebraska Territory

The Nebraska Territory's original boundaries (as specified by its Organic Act) included much of the original Louisiana Purchase; the territory's boundaries were:

- Southern: 40° N (the current Kansas–Nebraska border);
- Western: the Continental Divide between the Pacific and the Atlantic/Arctic Oceans;
- Northern: 49° N (the U.S.–British North America border);
- Eastern: the White Earth and Missouri rivers.

=== Subsequent territory creation ===
Upon creation, the territory encompassed most of the northern Great Plains, much of the upper Missouri River basin and the eastern portions of the northern Rocky Mountains. The Nebraska Territory gradually reduced in size as new territories were created in the 1860s.

The Colorado Territory was formed February 28, 1861 from portions of the territory south of 41° N and west of 102°03′ W (25° W of Washington, D.C.) (an area that includes present-day Fort Collins, Greeley and the portions of Boulder north of Baseline Road, in addition to portions of Kansas Territory, New Mexico Territory, and Utah Territory).

March 2, 1861, saw the creation of the Dakota Territory. It was made of all of the portions of Nebraska Territory north of 43° N (the present-day Nebraska–South Dakota border), along with the portion of present-day Nebraska between 43° N and the Keya Paha and Niobrara rivers (this land would be returned to Nebraska in 1882). The act creating the Dakota Territory also included provisions granting Nebraska small portions of Utah Territory and Washington Territory—present-day southwestern Wyoming bounded by 41° N, 110°03′ W (33° W of Washington, D.C.), 43° N, and the Continental Divide. These portions had not been part of the Louisiana Purchase; rather, they had been part of Oregon Country and became part of the United States in 1846.

On March 3, 1863, the Idaho Territory was formed of all the territory west of 104°03′ W (27° W of Washington, D.C.).

== See also ==
- Nebraska in the American Civil War
- California Trail
- First transcontinental railroad
- Historic regions of the United States
- History of Nebraska
- Landmarks of the Nebraska Territory
- Mormon Trail
- Oregon Trail
- Territorial evolution of the United States
- Timeline of Racial Tension in Omaha, Nebraska
