= Morwitz =

Morwitz is a German and Jewish surname. Notable people with the surname include:

- Edward Morwitz (1815–1893), German-American physician, inventor and newspaper publisher
- Ernst Morwitz (1887–1971), German-American poet, literary historian and judge
