= John James Maximilian Oertel =

German-American journalist (1811–1882)

John James Maximilian Oertel (born at Ansbach, Bavaria, 27 April 1811; died at Jamaica, New York, 21 August 1882) was a German-American journalist.

== Life ==
Born in Ansbach and raised as a Lutheran, Oertel studied theology at the Lutheran University of Erlangen, and five years later was ordained a minister. After his ordination, he accepted an invitation from the Evangelical Missionary Society of Barmen to preach irenic theology in the United States, and arrived in New York in October, 1837.

Frustrated by the theology of the New York Lutherans, Oertel left for Missouri in 1839, where he sought out Martin Stephan, a prominent Lutheran bishop. However, Oertel found himself no happier with the state of Lutheranism in Missouri, and shortly thereafter returned to New York.

In 1840, under the spiritual guidance of William Quarter, Oertel became a Roman Catholic. An account of his conversion in pamphlet form, published 25 March 1840 under the title "Reasons of John James Maximilian Oertel, late a Lutheran minister, for becoming a Catholic", had quite a vogue in the controversial literature of the day.

After his conversion, Oertel taught German at St. John's College, Fordham. Later he moved to Cincinnati, where he enjoyed the thriving German Catholic immigrant community. There he edited the "Wahrheitsfreund", a German Catholic weekly. In 1846, Oertel left for Baltimore where he founded the weekly "Kirchenzeitung". Under his editorial direction, it was the most prominent German Catholic publication in the United States. In 1851, he moved the paper to New York. In 1869 he published "Altes und Neues".

In 1875 Pope Pius IX made Oertel a Knight of St. Gregory in recognition of his service to the Church and Catholic literature.
