= Philadelphia Demokrat =

German-language morning paper in Philadelphia, Pennsylvania, 1838 to 1918

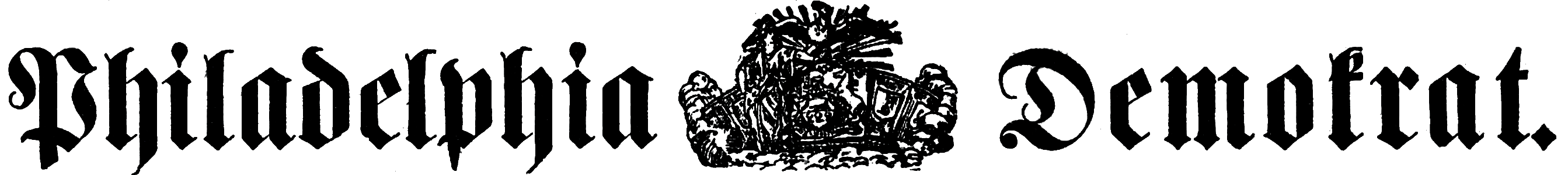

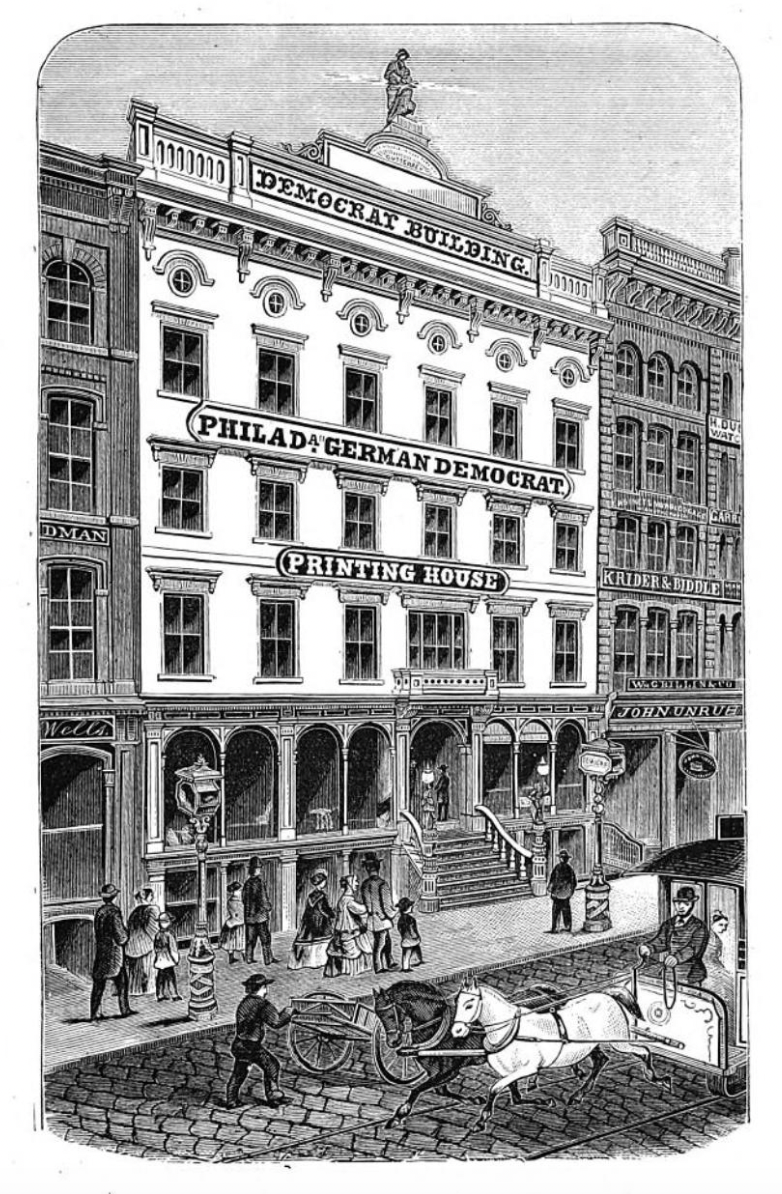
- The second Demokrat building, constructed in 1868
- Type: Daily
- Founded: 1838
- Ceased publication: 1918
- Political alignment: Democratic Party
- Language: German
- Headquarters: Philadelphia, Pennsylvania, US

The Philadelphia Demokrat was a German-language morning paper in Philadelphia, Pennsylvania, United States. Affiliated with the Democratic Party, it was published from 1838 to 1918.

== History ==
The Demokrat was founded in May 1838 by a number of German-speaking Democrats, for the purpose of supporting David R. Porter as a candidate for governor, against Joseph Ritner. It was the first journal of its kind in the United States. Its first number was issued on 27 August 1838. Burkhardt and Georg Rottenstein were the publishers, and No. 391 (old number) North Front Street, between Green and Coates Streets (now Fairmount Avenue), was the publication office. After Porter's election the Demokrat was, for a short time, issued weekly, but soon became a daily paper again.

In the second year of its existence, Ludwig August Wollenweber became the proprietor, and published it first at the corner of Old York Road and Callowhill Street, and afterward in Third Street, below Noble. In 1852, Wollenweber sold the paper to John S. Hoffman, and in September 1853, Hoffman sold the paper to Edward Morwitz. Hoffman however remained involved with the paper as an adviser, and the firm of Hoffman & Morwitz was established. This arrangement continued until the 9 July 1873 when Hoffman withdrew from the firm. Afterwards the publication of the Demokrat was continued by Morwitz under the firm of Morwitz & Co. In his conduct of the paper, Morwitz advocated measures for the improvement of the city, among them the consolidation of its different sections under a single mayor.

In November 1868, the office was moved to a new printing house, Nos. 612 and 614 Chestnut Street. The Demokrat at that time was a four-page paper, containing thirty-six columns. In the mid-1880s, its newspaper, publishing, and printing business was the largest and most extensive German establishment of its kind in the United States.

== See also ==
- List of German-language newspapers published in the United States
