= Joseph A. Hemann =

American journalist

Joseph Anton Hemann (1816-1897)

Joseph Anton Hemann (Dec 13, 1816, Oesede – Jun 28, 1897, Cincinnati) was a German-American educator, newspaper publisher, and banker.

== Biography ==
Joseph was born in Germany in the town of Oesede near Osnabrück, Kingdom of Hanover, and studied at the Gymnasium Carolinum in Osnabrück, one of the most celebrated colleges of Germany. He acquired a thorough knowledge of the Latin, Greek, French, and English languages, mathematics, and history. In the spring of 1837, at the age of 20, without his parents or other family members, he embarked at the harbor of Bremerhaven and sailed for the American shores. Two months later the ship Favorite entered the Chesapeake Bay and dropped anchor in the harbor of Baltimore.

Shortly after his arrival, young Hemann, who had brought with him prominent credentials, visited with Professor Beleké at Mount St. Mary's College near Emmitsburg, Maryland. The professor advised him to go to Cincinnati where he might complete his studies at the Athenæum, the Catholic seminary of the diocese. Having no further means, Mr. Hemann worked a month on the canal near Hagerstown, Maryland, to earn sufficient money to enable him to make the journey.

In the fall of 1837, he joined an emigrant train of large mountain wagons and in their company crossed the Alleghenies on the National Road to Wheeling. Being the only one in the company who could speak the English language, Mr. Hemann acted as interpreter for the rest, bought the provisions, and was held in high esteem by his companions. During the prolonged voyage the young traveler was able to study the romantic scenery and the people of the country. They landed safely in the port of the Queen City of the West on October 7, 1837.

The letters of credence from Professor Beleké were given to Dr. Joshua Young, the prefect at the Athenæum, who later became the Bishop of Erie. Hemann was welcomed at the seminary, where he continued his studies until he followed a call of Rev. Ferdinand Kühr, whose acquaintance he made at the Athenæum, and accepted a position as teacher at the Catholic parochial school in Canton, Ohio, where he remained about a year and a half.

It was during his stay in Canton when he met his wife. On January 28, 1839, in Stark County, Canton, Ohio, at St. John the Baptist Catholic Church, he married Anna Margaret, daughter of John Baptiste DeVille, who had emigrated in 1831 from the town of Hachy in the Province of Luxembourg, Belgium.

He then returned to Cincinnati and took charge of the new German Catholic school in the Over-the-Rhine area, which he opened from the large hall of the then Rising Sun tavern, on the corner of Main and Thirteenth streets. This school became the nucleus of the second German Catholic congregation of Cincinnati, which in the next year became St. Mary's Church, at the corner of Thirteenth and Clay streets.

In Cincinnati, at that time, the question of introducing the German language as a regular branch of instruction in the public schools was agitated with great vehemence, and after a severe struggle the Legislature of Ohio passed a law, making it the duty of the trustees of the common schools of Cincinnati to have the German language taught in the schools under their care. Accordingly, an examination for teachership was advertised, and Mr. Hemann was among the several candidates that passed successfully and received a certificate. He shortly afterwards received his appointment, and accordingly began the organization of the first public German-English school in America in 1840.

Differing, however, from the majority of the school trustees, who endeavored to squelch the efficiency of the whole system, he resigned in July, 1841, when the celebrated German-English school struggle ensued, which caused great commotion in the then quiet annals of the city. The Germans withdrew their children from the public schools, and organized schools of their own, and Hemann was appointed principal. There were differences of opinion between Mr. Hemann and the Germans on one side, and the school-trustees on the other. The Germans insisted upon a system of comparative education, whilst the board wanted separate instructions. The Germans kept up their own schools until the next year, when they induced the majority of the trustees to modify their system, and adopt that of comparative tuition. Mr. Hemann, however, quit the public schools, and went back again to the principalship of St. Mary's school. Here he remained for five or six years, during which period he also kept an evening school, in which class several of the most prominent citizens of Cincinnati, such as Uncle Joe Siefert, John H. Koehnken, and others, were then sitting to study English.

Mr. Hemann was also very active in the fostering of charitable and educational institutions of Cincinnati. In 1840, when German books were very scarce in the city, he was the first mover for the organization of a library society, the Schul- und Leseverein, which was in successful operation for many years, and laid the foundation for many of Cincinnati's best educated citizens. The founding of the Catholic Institute in Cincinnati was prominently the work of Mr. Hemann.

"We Germans," he said in an oration delivered July 4, 1844, "have learned in the land of our fathers only to obey. We had no power to decide our own good, our own welfare. For the love of freedom we left the land of our birth, friends, relatives, all that was dear to us, to gather here in a strange country, the fruits of liberty so magnanimously offered to the oppressed of all the world. It is our special duty to make ourselves acquainted with the language, the laws and the institutions of this our self-chosen new home."

Hemann became tired of the schoolmaster's baculus, and opened a dry-goods store on Main Street, opposite Twelfth Street. In 1848, he relocated the store to the corner of Linn and Laurel streets. Here he made the acquaintance of a prominent literary gentleman, who advised Mr. Hemann not to bury his talents in a dry-goods shelf, but to go into the literary pursuit. While on a journey to his native country in the summer of 1850, subject to his instruction by letter, the Wahrheitsfreund, the first German Catholic newspaper in the United States, was purchased for him. He then hastened home and took the publishing of the paper in his own hand; and on October 12, 1850, he began the publication of the Cincinnati Volksfreund, one of the principal German daily newspapers of the country. Originally neutral in politics, it afterwards, when the Demokratisches Tageblatt, one of the organs of the Democratic party, ceased to exist, and when the Volksblatt went over to the Republican party, became the leading German Democratic paper of Ohio.

Mr. Hemann was, however, very conservative in his views, and when, in 1863, the waves of political agitation ran high, which peaked with the nomination of Clement Vallandigham, then in exile in Canada, for governor of Ohio, he declined to advocate Vallandigham's election in his paper. This caused a spirit of opposition among his subscribers, which led Mr. Hemann to dispose of his interest in the Volksfreund, and to retire from a long and eventful literary career, in which he had been prominently successful. The Volksfreund however, continued to be published in Cincinnati until June 1908.

When John P. Walsh retired in January 1862, Hemann became the new publisher of The Catholic Telegraph newspaper in Cincinnati through December 1864. At the time it was ably edited by Rev. S. H. Rosecrans and the Very Rev. Edward Purcell.

In 1863 after he sold the Volksfreund to Mr. John B. Jeup, Hemann and his family moved from Cincinnati to Glendale, Ohio for a couple years. In 1865, Joseph embarked in the life of a banker and in 1868 established the Joseph A. Hemann and Co., a banking house located in downtown Cincinnati on the southwest corner of Third and Walnut Streets. The firm specialized in foreign exchange and in assisting immigrants until its demise in October 1878.

In June 1868, he was one of the first projectors of the German Pioneer Society and the first man to urge the publication of the historic monthly magazine, the Deutsche Pionier, published by this society, of which he edited the first volume.

In 1870, Joseph built the two-story red brick house in the Cincinnati neighborhood of Corryville on the corner of West McMillan and Hollister. Over a hundred years later, because the house represents a distinctive period in urban vernacular architecture, it was placed on the National Register of Historic Places in 1980 as the Joseph A. Hemann House.

In 1872, Hemann was appointed to the building committee for the new St. George Church in Clifton on Calhoun Street, a parish that both physically and spiritually attracted immigrant Germans to lower Corryville.

The marriage between Joseph and his wife Anna Margaret was blessed with eleven children, six sons and five daughters. In January 1876, there were seventeen grandchildren, five of their children being married. In 1879, at the age of 63, he and his wife returned to Canton, Ohio, where he established the weekly edition of the German newspaper Ohio Volks Zeitung.
