= Nevada Staats-Zeitung =

Defunct newspaper

- Type: Weekly German language newspaper
- Editor-in-chief: Herman Milton Bien
- Founded: October 28, 1864
- Political alignment: Republican
- Language: German
- Ceased publication: December 1875
- Headquarters: Virginia City

The Nevada Staats-Zeitung was a weekly German language newspaper in Virginia City, Nevada that was published from 1864 to 1875, during the Comstock silver rush. Editions were four pages and published on Saturdays. The editor of the newspaper was German Jewish journalist, rabbi, and politician Herman Milton Bien. The paper was politically Republican.

== See also ==
- List of German-language newspapers published in the United States
