= Carl Otto Reventlow =

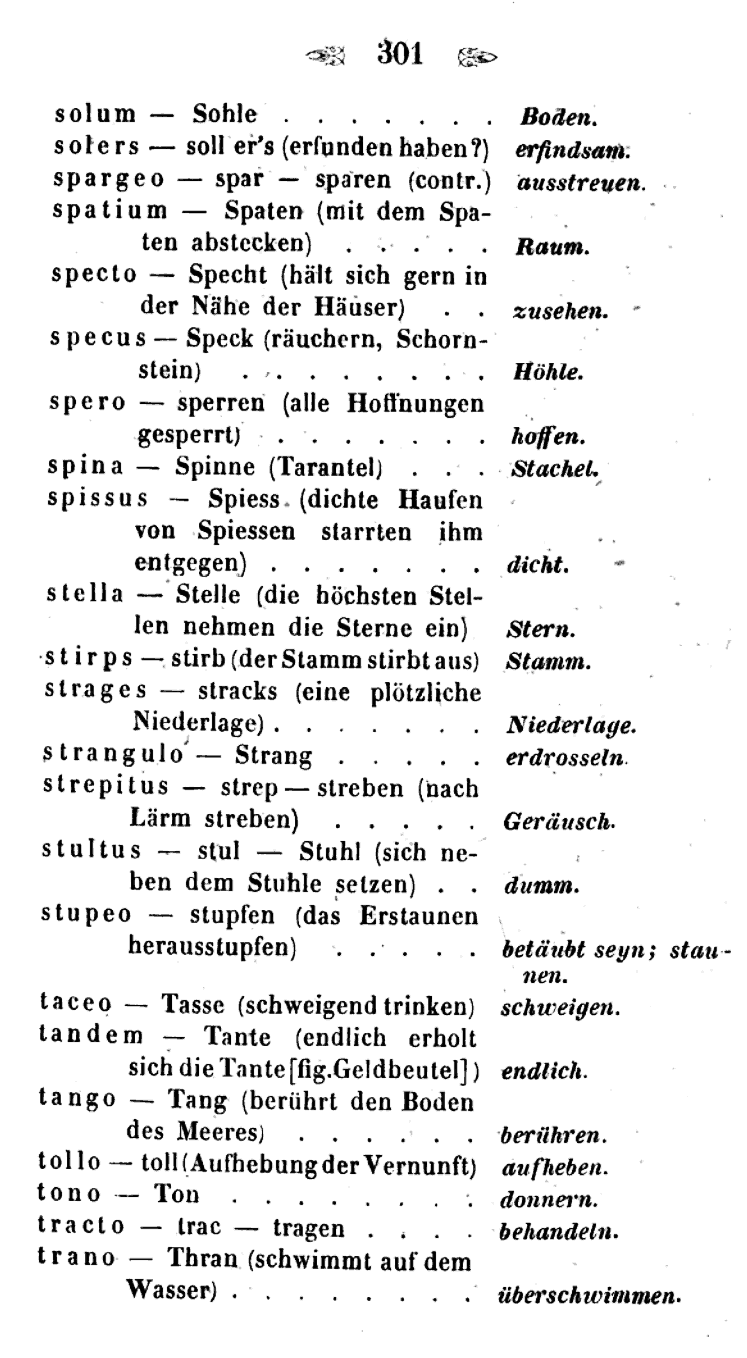
Carl Otto Reventlow: Praktisches Lehrbuch der Mnemotechnik, 1847, page 301 – Linkword method with Latin words, keywords with explanation and German translation

Carl Otto Reventlow (actually Karl [Carl] Christian Otto; 10 December 1817 in Store Heddinge – 19 April 1873) became notable as the developer of a mnemonic system. He took the nom de plume Reventlow to distinguish himself from journalists with the same family name. There is, despite a personal acquaintance to some members to the Reventlow family of old Holstein-Mecklenburg nobility through his studies at University of Kiel, no family relation.

== Biography ==
Otto took up studies in philology at the University of Copenhagen and the University of Kiel. There he became a member of the student fraternity Corps Saxonia and made contact to political circles and started first publications. Later he focused on the art of memory enhancement. After publishing a textbook on his mnemonic system in 1843, he travelled widely in Germany to popularize it. His most notable lectures were given in Leipzig, but also in Prague. A dictionary that substituted mnemonic terms for numbers and a guideline for the use of mnemotechnics in schools which listed some 3,000 mnemotechnically annotated facts from history and geography courses followed in 1844 and 1846, respectively.

The novelty of Otto's "substitution method" was disputed almost immediately, his opponents stating it to be just one more derivative of the method proposed by Aimé Paris. However, it received highly favorable reviews as well.

Otto subsequently involved himself in the revolutionary events of 1848, and came under police investigation in 1849. Apparently he was the Carl Otto-Reventlow who took over a Cincinnati radical, anti-monarchist periodical for German-speaking exiles, the Hochwächter, in 1857. He appears to have had some contact with Karl Marx, who referred to him in extremely derogatory terms in at least one of his letters.
