= Buffalo Demokrat =

American german-language newspaper

Der Buffalo Demokrat
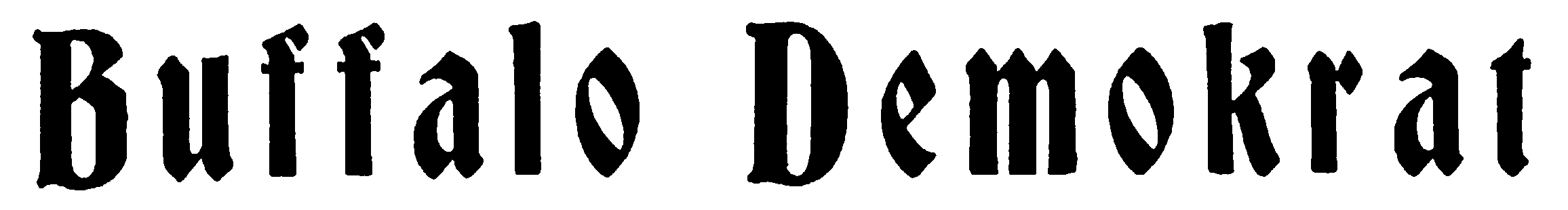
- Type: Daily German language newspaper
- Editor-in-chief: Jacob Knapp (1848-1850); Carl de Haas (1848-1851); Hermann Raster (1852-1853)
- Founded: 1848
- Ceased publication: 1918
- Political alignment: Free Soil Party, later Democratic
- Language: German
- Headquarters: Buffalo, New York

The Buffalo Demokrat was a daily German language newspaper from Buffalo, New York published from 1848 until 1918.

The Demokrat was founded as the Freie Demokrat but changed its name in 1850, when it came under new ownership. Initially the newspaper was an ardent supporter of the Free soil movement, and was affiliated with the party, though later became an organ for the Democratic Party.

Newly immigrated Forty-Eighter Hermann Raster became editor of the paper in 1851, but left soon after obtaining the post for another editorial job at the New-Yorker Abend-Zeitung.

The newspaper ceased publication in 1918.

== See also ==
- List of German-language newspapers published in the United States
