= Nashviller Demokrat =

German language newspaper in Nashville, Tennessee

- Type: Daily German language newspaper
- Editor-in-chief: Theodor Trauernicht (1866–1869); A.S. Jourdan (1869–1871)
- Founded: 1866
- Ceased publication: 1871
- Political alignment: Democratic
- Language: German
- Headquarters: Nashville
- Circulation: 1,000 (1870)

The Nashviller Demokrat was a daily German language newspaper in Nashville, Tennessee that was published from 1866 to 1871. Affiliated with the Democratic Party and vocally supportive of President Andrew Johnson, the paper was one of two major German language publications in the city alongside its rival Tennessee Staatszeitung, a Radical Republican newspaper. In 1869, the Staatszeitung was sold by its editor, John Ruhm, and was acquired by the Demokrat. The Nashviller Demokrat only survived two additional years, ceasing publication in 1871.

== See also ==
- List of German-language newspapers published in the United States
