= Der Hochwächter =

Newspaper in Cincinnati, Ohio

Der Hochwächter, literally "The High Guard", was a German-language newspaper published in Cincinnati, Ohio, United States. It was published from 1845 to 1849.

The paper was established by German Forty-Eighters - political activists who fled the German Confederation after the defeat of the revolutions of 1848. In its early years, the paper was intensely anti-monarchist, pro-republican, and virulently opposed to the Roman Catholic Church, which it viewed as having supported the ancien régime in 1848.

The paper was active in denouncing the role of the new Papal Nuncio, Cardinal Gaetano Bedini, in defeating the 1848 Revolutionaries in the Papal States right before his visit to Cincinnati. Der Hochwächter even called for the Nuncio's assassination, which resulted in the Cincinnati riot of 1853. Carl Otto Reventlow became editor in 1857.

== See also ==
- Cincinnati Volksfreund
- Der Wahrheitsfreund, a Catholic German newspaper in Cincinnati
- Cincinnati Volksblatt
