= Der Demokrat =

German language newspaper in Davenport, Iowa

- Type: Daily German language newspaper
- Publisher: Lischer Printing Co.
- Editor-in-chief: Theodor Johannes Hesdorf Gülich (1851–1856)
- Founded: 1851
- Ceased publication: September 8, 1918
- Political alignment: Republican (after 1856)
- Language: German
- Headquarters: Davenport, Iowa
- Circulation: 1,500 daily 4,200 weekly

Der Demokrat was a German language newspaper in Davenport, Iowa that was published from 1851 to 1918. As with many other German language publications in the United States, anti-German sentiment as a consequence of World War I resulted in the paper's dissolution in late 1918. The paper's founder and first editor, Theodor Gülich, was a socialist. Gülich sold the paper to Henry Lischer in 1856, after which the paper became politically Republican. The paper had a daily circulation of 1,500 and a weekly circulation of 4,200 in 1877.

== See also ==
- List of German-language newspapers published in the United States
