= New-Yorker Abend-Zeitung =

Defunct American newspaper

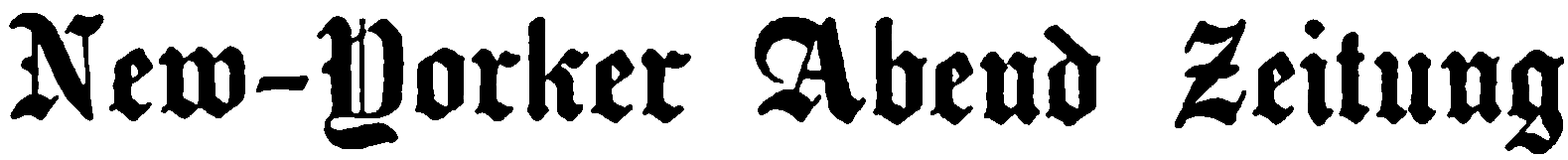
- Type: Daily German language newspaper
- Publisher: Friedrich Rauchfuss
- Editor-in-chief: Hermann Raster (1852–1867)
- Founded: 1851
- Ceased publication: 1874
- Political alignment: Republican Party
- Language: German
- Headquarters: New York City
- Circulation: 2,300 (1856)

The New-Yorker Abend-Zeitung was a daily evening German language newspaper in New York City published from 1851 to 1874 that directly competed with the Democratic New Yorker Staats-Zeitung.

== History ==
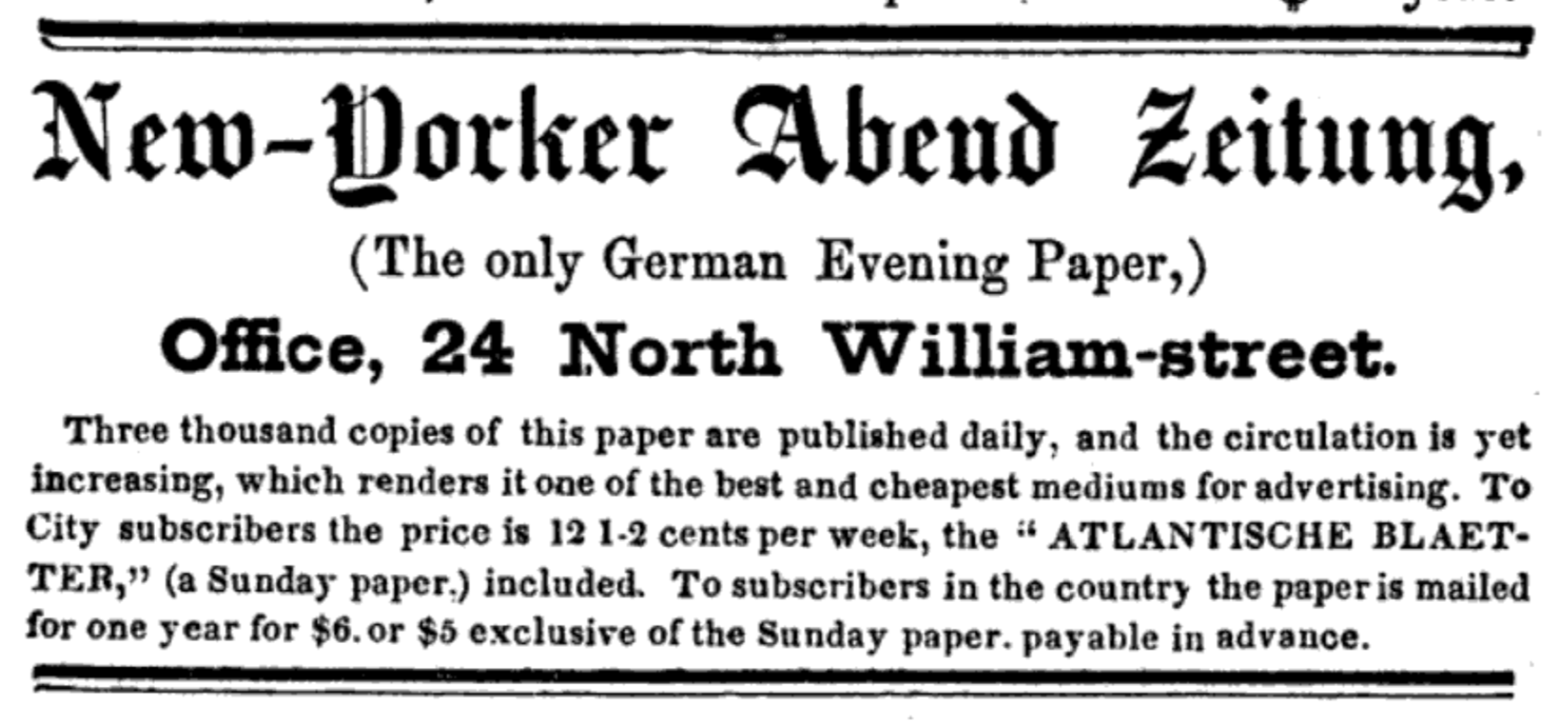
1856 advertisement for the New-Yorker Abend-Zeitung

Published by revolutionary émigré Forty Eighter Friedrich Rauchfuss, the newspaper was strongly anti-slavery and affiliated with the burgeoning Republican Party. Friedrich Kapp served as the first editor. In 1852, Rauchfuss hired journalist Hermann Raster as editor-in-chief, himself a fellow Forty Eighter from the Duchy of Anhalt who previously served as editor of the abolitionist newspaper the Buffalo Demokrat. In the events leading up to the American Civil War, the paper, which was considered radical at the time, expressed the view that John Brown's raid on Harpers Ferry was a revolutionary act of a European character, which Raster deemed atypical for the United States. During the war, the paper was staunchly pro-Union. In 1867, Raster left his position as editor-in-chief after fifteen years and relocated to Chicago to edit the Illinois Staats-Zeitung.

The separate Sunday edition of the paper was called the Atlantische Blätter.

== See also ==
- List of German-language newspapers published in the United States
