= Farm und Haus =

Defunct newspaper

- Type: Monthly German language agricultural newspaper
- Publisher: Farm und Haus Publishing Co.
- Editor-in-chief: John Horsch
- Founded: August 1898
- Ceased publication: 1905
- Language: German
- Headquarters: Elkhart, Indiana, Madison, Wisconsin (1898–1900); Berne, Indiana (1900-1902); Bluffton, Ohio (1902–1905)
- Circulation: 6,583 (1904)

Farm und Haus was a German language agricultural newspaper in the United States that was published from 1898 to 1905. Initially based in Elkhart, Indiana and Madison, Wisconsin, it moved to Berne, Indiana in 1900 and finally to Bluffton, Ohio in 1902. By 1904, the monthly circulation was 6,583. The paper's editor was Mennonite historian and writer John Horsch.

== See also ==
- List of German-language newspapers published in the United States
