= Montana Staats-Zeitung =

German language newspaper in Helena, Montana

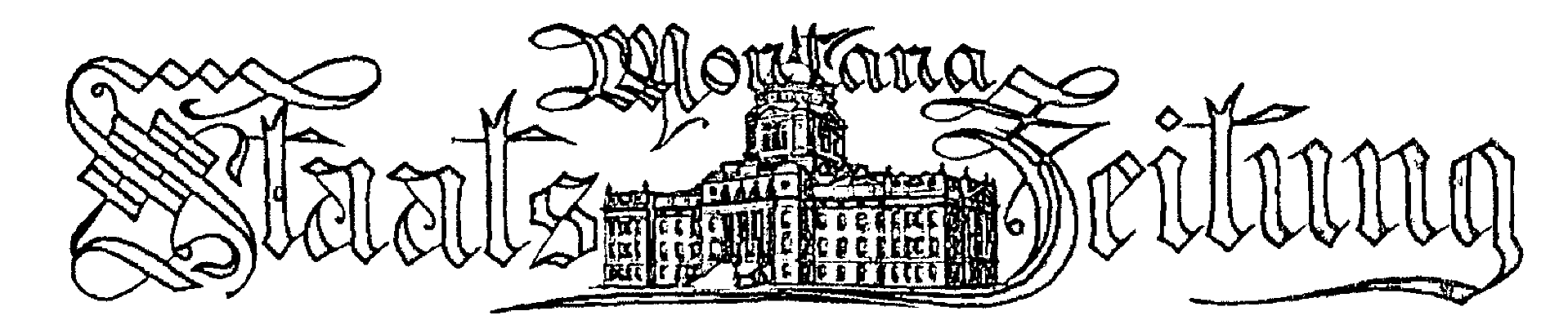
- Type: Daily German language newspaper
- Founded: 1886
- Political alignment: Independent
- Language: German
- Ceased publication: 1917
- Headquarters: Helena, Montana
- Circulation: 1,800 (1910)

The Montana Staats-Zeitung was a weekly German language newspaper in Helena, Montana that was published from 1886 to 1917. Initially founded under the name Montana Freie Presse, which was changed in 1889. It was the only major German-language newspaper in Montana and neighboring Idaho at the time and its readership primarily consisted of Germans, Austrians, and Swiss residing in the two territories/states. The paper had representatives in Berlin, Vienna, Zürich, New York City, and Chicago. The Montana Staats-Zeitung abruptly ceased publication in September 1917, citing rising costs, censorship of German-language material as a consequence of World War I, paper shortages, and the editor's absence (the editor at the time had not returned from Chicago in over five months) as reasons for its demise.

== See also ==
- List of German-language newspapers published in the United States
