= Virginia Staats-Gazette =

German language newspaper in Nashville, Tn

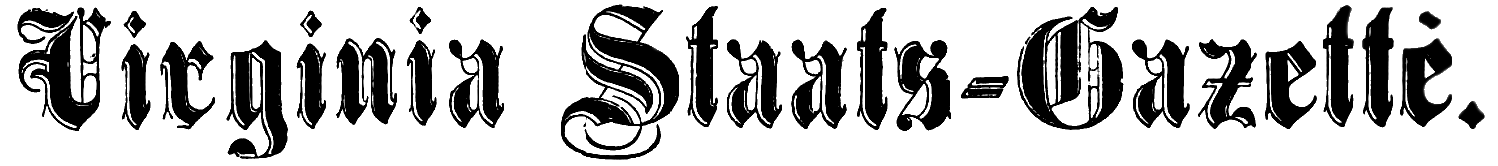
- Type: Daily German language newspaper
- Publisher: Moritz Friedrich Richter (1886–1904)
- Founded: 1870
- Political alignment: Independent
- Language: German
- Ceased publication: 1904
- Headquarters: Richmond, Virginia
- Circulation: 1,000 (1872)

The Virginia Staats-Gazette was a daily German language newspaper in Richmond, Virginia that was published from 1870 to 1904. The paper was the largest German language publication in the state of Virginia and its daily circulation peaked at 1,000 in 1872. The Staats-Gazette also published a Sunday edition from 1876.

== See also ==
- List of German-language newspapers published in the United States
