= Louis August Wollenweber =

American journalist

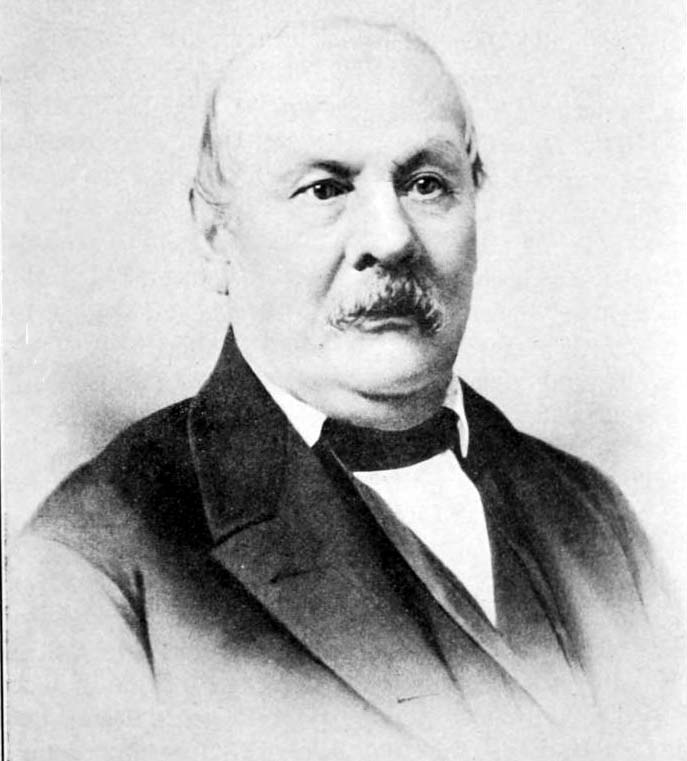
- "Der Alte vom Berge" (The old man from the mountain); photograph by F. Meynen
- Born: 5 December 1807; Ixheim (now Zweibrücken), Germany
- Died: 25 July 1888 (aged 80); Reading, Pennsylvania

Louis [or Ludwig] August Wollenweber (5 December 1807 – 25 July 1888) was a German-American German-language journalist and a writer of prose and poetry in Pennsylvania Dutch.

== Biography ==
=== Germany ===
As he was orphaned early in life, he was compelled to give up any hope for higher education. He was educated at Speyer for the trade of a printer. Upon the completion of his term of apprenticeship, he traveled through Germany as a journeyman worker, finally settling in Homburg and working for the Deutsche Tribüne. He was compelled to emigrate to the United States, via France and the Netherlands, in consequence of his being one of the agitators of the "Hambacher Volksfest." The journal he was working on was suppressed by the German Diet as well.

=== Pennsylvania ===
After his arrival in Philadelphia, he was first engaged on J. G. Wesselhöft's Schnellpost. He later founded a new German-language paper, Der Freimuethige (The Free-Thinker), which lasted only for a short time. He subsequently acquired possession of the Demokrat, the chief German-language newspaper in Philadelphia. In 1853 he sold the Demokrat to his brother-in-law, John S. Hoffman, and afterward resided in the Lebanon Valley and in Reading. Here he was a frequent correspondent of the German newspapers, and wrote much. He wrote chiefly in Hochdeutsch (literary or high German), but also did some pieces in Pennsylvania German dialect.

He was uncommon among 19th-century immigrants who deliberately wanted to be counted as a Pennsylvania German, and tried to speak and write, or thought he was speaking and writing, their idiom.

== Works ==
- Gemälde aus dem pennsylvanischen Volksleben (Sketches of Domestic Life in Pennsylvania), a collection of poems and sketches in the Pennsylvania German language. (Philadelphia, 1869)
- Treu bis in den Tod (Faithful onto death; 1875)
- Zwei treue Kameraden (Two loyal comrades; 1878)
- Gila, das Indianermädchen oder die wiedergefundenen deutschen Kinder unter den Indianern (Gila, the Indian maid or German children found again amidst the Indians), a play
- Freuden und Leiden in Amerika, oder die Lateiner am Schuylkill Canal (Joy and suffering in America or Classical scholars on the Schuylkill Canal), a play
- General Peter Mühlenberg, a tale of the revolutionary war
- Sprache, Sitten und Gebräuche der Deutsch-Pennsylvanier (Language, customs and habits of the Pennsylvania Germans)
- Aus Berks County schwerster Zeit (The worst times in Berks County), a tale of the pioneers of Berks County
- Die drei gräber auf dem Riethen Kirchhof (The three graves in Riethe graveyard)
- Die erste Mühle am Mühlbach (The first mill at Mühlbach)
