= Nebraska Palladium =

Newspaper in the Nebraska Territory

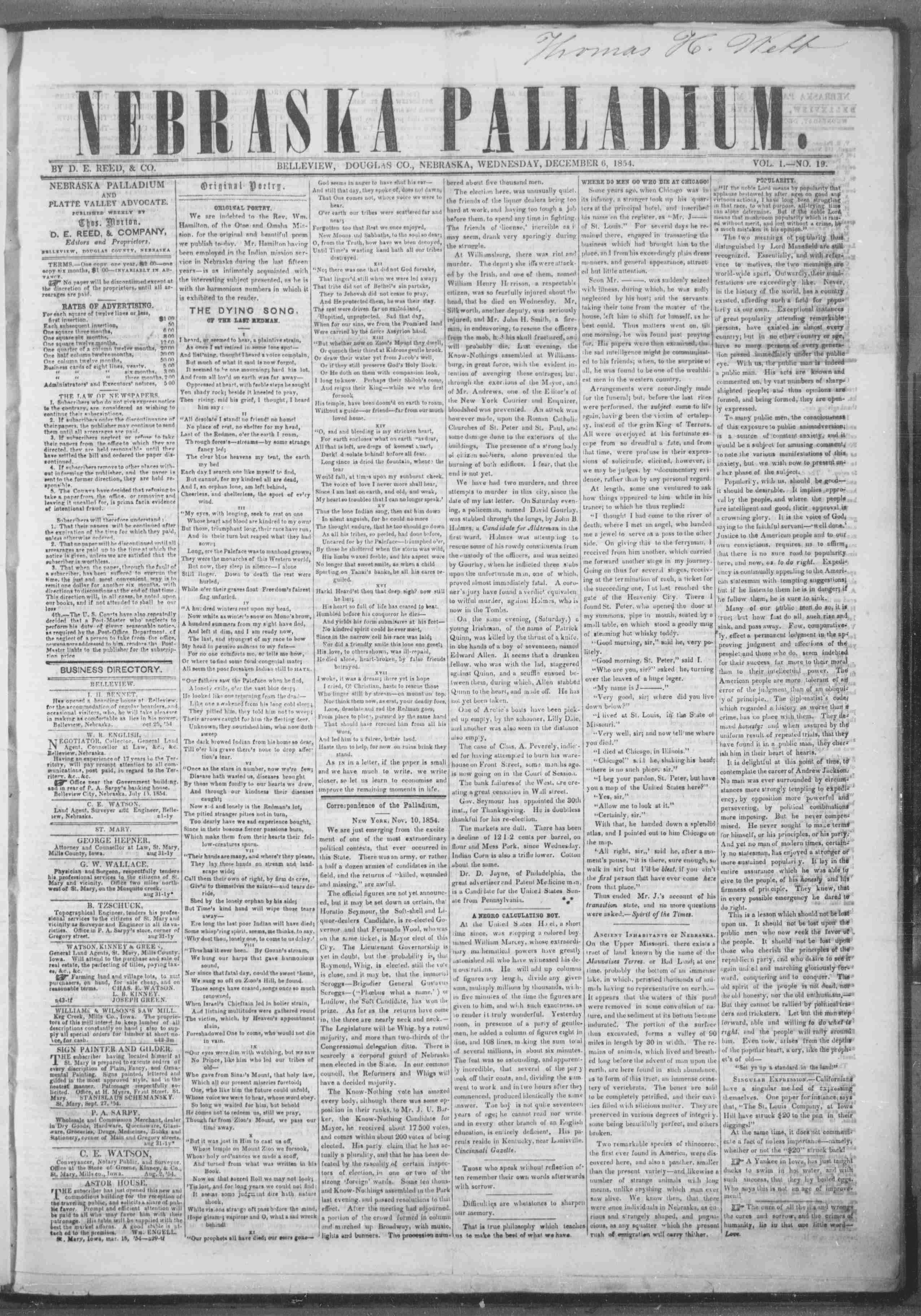
The front page of the 6 December 1854 issue of the Nebraska Palladium

The Nebraska Palladium and Platte Valley Advocate, also known simply as the Nebraska Palladium, was the first newspaper published in the Nebraska Territory. Over the course of its publication from 1854 to 1855, it sought to make Bellevue, Nebraska, the territorial capital.

== Publication ==
The full name of the paper was the Nebraska Palladium and Platte Valley Advocate; its name came from the palladium in classical antiquity, in which a xoanon of Athena was said to protect Troy. After Daniel E. Reed and his wife moved to the territory from New England, Along with Journalist Thomas Morton,they founded and published the paper in Bellevue, Nebraska, in 1854. (Note: Then known as "Belleview".) It was the first newspaper published in the Nebraska Territory, (Note: There was possibly a newspaper published at Fort Kearny in 1847, near present-day Nebraska City.) though some of its earliest issues were printed in St. Mary, Iowa. (Note: From July 15 to November 18, 1854.) The publication of the first issue was a momentous occasion for Nebraska politicians: Thomas B. Cuming, who was acting as the territorial governor, worked on the first proof sheet, and Fenner Ferguson, the chief justice of the territory's supreme court, was its reader. Reed declared that the event "may seem unimportant now" but "will form an epoch in history, which will be remembered ages after those present on this interesting occasion, are no more". (Note: Reed also gave a mythical reading of the paper's founding, saying that it arose out of "heathen darkness", and that as "the Indian disappears before the light of civilization, so may the darkness and error of the human mind flee before the light of the press in Nebraska".)

The paper published poetry, reports on the musical life of Nebraska, and it had a distinctive political perspective: It advocated for Bellevue to become the territorial capital over Omaha. It rivaled the Arrow, (Note: The Arrow was published just 13 days after the Nebraska Palladium had its first issue.) edited by Joseph E. Johnson, a Mormon, who sought to increase settlement in Omaha and make it the capital. After Johnson's Arrow collapsed, he created the Bugle, which continued his agitation to mark Omaha as the capital; ultimately, he succeeded, and the Nebraska Palladium blamed Johnson for its selection. The editors at the Nebraska Palladium printed a fake letter from Joseph Smith, the founder of Mormonism, to Johnson: The letter contained congratulations to Johnson for exercising "deceit in flattery", suggested that Johnson "let no lies stay you (I have no fears)", and announced that Omaha was a suitable city.

Its readership extended from the Nebraska Territory into Iowa, and it frequently received letters from Iowan readers.

== Demise ==
The final issue of the paper was published on April 11, 1855. In its final issue, it identified two main causes for its collapse: That there was not sufficient "town pride" to cover the costs of printing the paper, and separately, that it could not find advertisers to support the paper financially. They hoped to begin publication of the paper later, after "better auspices" had been located, but this never happened.

== Notes and references ==
=== Bibliography ===
- Dyer, Karen M. (1985). "Musical expression on the Great Plains: Nebraska, 1854–1904". American Music. 3 (2): 143–151.
- Fader, Garnet Nelson (1928). "The pioneer press". Prairie Schooner. 2 (4): 248–257.
- Grone, Elizabeth (1949). "Nebraska newspaper names". American Speech. 24 (3): 194–200.
- Hawley, Charles Arthur (1941). "Whittier and Nebraska". Bulletin of Friends Historical Association. 30 (1): 17–46. ISSN 0361-1957.
- Homer, Michael W. (1984). "After Winter Quarters and Council Bluffs: The Mormons in Nebraska Territory, 1854–1867" (PDF). Nebraska History. 65: 467–483.
- Olson, James C. (1950). "The literary tradition in pioneer Nebraska". Prairie Schooner. 24 (2): 161–168. ISSN 0032-6682.
