= Tennessee Staatszeitung =

Defunct newspaper

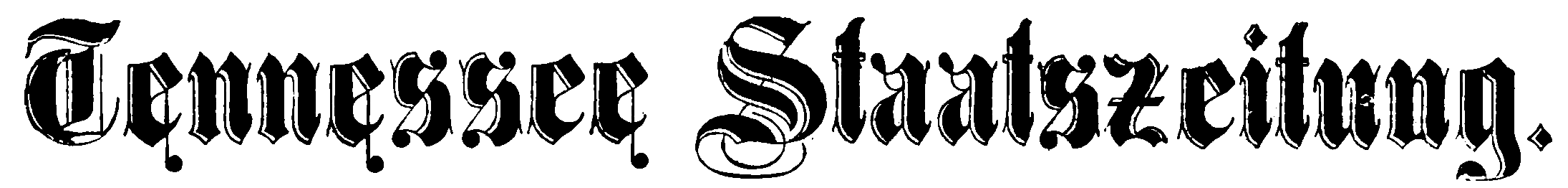
- Type: Daily German language newspaper
- Editor-in-chief: John Ruhm
- Founded: March 17, 1866
- Political alignment: Radical Republican
- Language: German
- Ceased publication: March 31, 1869
- Headquarters: Nashville
- Circulation: 1,000 (daily); 1,200 (weekly)

The Tennessee Staatszeitung was a daily German language newspaper in Nashville, Tennessee that was published from 1866 to 1869.

== History ==
The editor of the paper was German immigrant John Ruhm, a Union Army veteran and a staunch advocate for radical reconstruction in the postbellum American South. The paper was strongly against the policies of Andrew Johnson, going as far as to call him a traitor to the Union, and lent considerable support to the Radical Republicans of Tennessee and their leader, William G. Brownlow. Support from the Staatszeitung was so strong that it was designated the official government newspaper of its local congressional district.

In March 1869, following Democratic victory over the Radical Republicans in Tennessee, the paper, along with several other radical publications in the state, ceased publishing and was bought out by its rival German language newspaper in the area, the Nashviller Demokrat. Following this, Ruhm went on to practice law in Nashville and served on the Davidson County School Board.

== See also ==
- List of German-language newspapers published in the United States
