= Nebraska Staats-Zeitung =

Defunct newspaper

- Type: Weekly German language newspaper
- Founded: April 4, 1861
- Ceased publication: 1915
- Political alignment: Republican (until 1890)
- Language: German
- Headquarters: Nebraska City (1861–1871, 1873–1915); Lincoln (1871–1873)
- Circulation: 1,805 (1910)

The Nebraska Staats-Zeitung was a German language newspaper in Nebraska that was published in from 1861 to 1915. It was the first German-language newspaper in the state. It had a weekly circulation of 850 in 1872 and 1,805 in 1910.

== History ==
The Nebraska Deutsche Zeitung was founded in 1861 by a group of twenty German Americans in Nebraska City. Frederick Renner, a physician and military officer from Speyer, was chosen as the paper's first editor and secretary. Renner was elected to the Nebraska legislature and worked with the paper until 1892. The name of the newspaper was changed to the Nebraska Staats-Zeitung in 1867. The Staats-Zeitung was founded as a politically neutral publication, but became affiliated with the Republican Party upon the outbreak of the American Civil War. This affiliation remained until the paper broke with the party due to its stance on tariffs and prohibition in 1890. The Zeitung had around 150 regular subscribers in Europe, to which copies were mailed weekly from Nebraska City.

== See also ==
- List of German-language newspapers published in the United States
