= Der Proletarier (1919) =

Der Proletarier ('The Proletarian') was a weekly newspaper published in Luxembourg between July 1919 and 1940. It the central organ of the Trade Union Commission of Luxembourg. It replaced the previous newspapers Die Volksstimme and Der Gewerkschaftler.

After the Second World War, Der Proletarier was replaced by Arbecht.
