= Der Proletarier (1853) =

Der Proletarier ('The Proletarian') was a German language socialist weekly newspaper published from Chicago, the United States. It began publishing in mid-1853, and was the first German-language socialist organ in the city. The newspaper was an initiative of a small group of German socialists who had fled to the United States following the defeat of the 1848 revolution. Henry Rösch served as the editor of the Der Proletarier. J. Karlen was another of the key figures of the newspaper.

== See also ==
- German language newspapers in the United States
