= Washington Journal (newspaper) =

This article incorporates public domain material from websites or documents of the Library of Congress.

The Washington Journal was a German-language newspaper published in Washington, D.C.

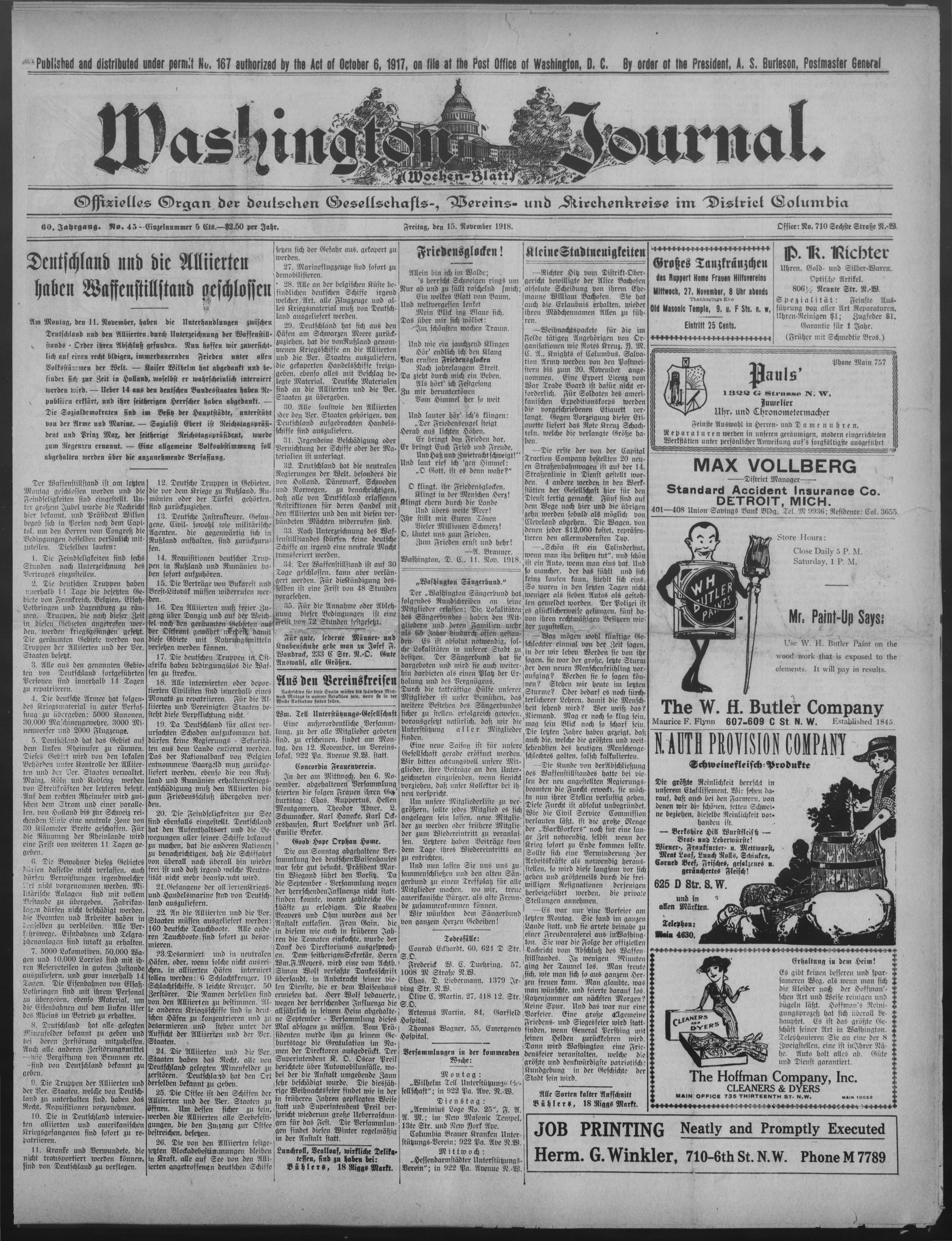
Front page of the first Washington Journal published after the German surrender in World War One, edition of November 15, 1918

In March 1871, Nehemiah H. Miller, Assistant District Attorney for the District Government, created a Republican German daily in Washington called Täglicher Washingtoner Anzeiger, a newspaper published daily except Sunday. Unlike Werner Koch's newspapers, which avoided politics and political parties, the Anzeiger was openly political. In 1873, the Anzeiger ran into financial difficulties before Miller decided to sell his newspaper to Koch. On March 31, 1873, Koch merged the Columbia and the Täglicher Washingtoner Anzeiger to become the Washingtoner Journal, published daily except Sunday.

The Journal promoted the social and cultural activities of German Americans. Because it openly opposed the Temperance Movement, the newspaper saw an increasing number of advertisements from Washington breweries, bars, and beer gardens, all of which provided income for the newspaper.

In April 1885, Koch reduced the publishing frequency of the Journal from six to three days a week. Two years later, the Washingtoner Journal (following German grammar) was renamed the Washington Journal and reduced to a weekly. In 1892, Christian Strack became editor, and the paper began including popular conservative serialized novels along with short stories, poems, and jingles produced by local talent.

On March 8, 1911, Werner Koch died from a lung tumor. In the March 11, 1911 issue of the Journal, Strack wrote a tribute to Koch. In that same issue, an advertisement was placed for the sale of the Washington Journal and its assets. The Journal was not profitable and was run at a loss for many years. The Journal ceased publishing March 25, 1911 when it could no longer pay the typesetters.

Without the Journal, there was no longer a German newspaper in Washington and over 30 German American societies felt this loss. Events and services for the German American community were not listed anywhere else and readers realized the impact on the community. Members of the National German-American Alliance came together to raise funds to save the Journal. On May 27, 1911, the Journal reappeared, eight weeks after it had shut down, with new management, the Washington Journal Co., under publisher Charles T. Schwegler, a leading German American businessperson in D.C. Unfortunately, Strack became ill and ended his tenure as editor in 1912. He later died on November 29, 1914. From 1912 to 1915, various members of the German American community and the Alliance took on the role of editor, including Max Hesselbach, Kurt Volkner, and Gustav Bender.

During World War I, the Alliance felt it was their duty to defend Germany's position in the war. Because of this, the Journal promoted the propaganda campaign created by the Alliance on behalf of the German cause. Many English articles from other publications such as the Fatherland, the official mouthpiece of the National German-American Alliance, and the Crucible, the statewide Alliance news bulletin for Virginia, were included in the Journal. Unfortunately, the Journal suddenly found itself denounced as “un-American” and “pro-Kaiser.”

In 1915, the Journal faced bankruptcy; however, Hermann G. Winkler, who was working as a printer for the Washington Journal, used all his savings to acquire the rights and assets of the Journal and take on the roles of publisher and editor, paralleling Koch's career with the newspaper.

Due to the Trading with the Enemy Act of October 1917, the Journal and other German-language newspapers in the United States had to provide exact English translations of all news and editorial matters related to the war to the local postmaster. Furthermore, public sentiment for German Americans was at an all-time low. Most advertisers withdrew because they feared being identified as un-American. Hate due to World War I eventually subsided, but many German-American societies had disbanded. To avoid a financial crisis, publishers of the Journal appealed to citizens for funding. Winkler also installed modern printing equipment, which enabled him to print and publish books. In 1923, Paul Gleis became editor.

At the onset of World War II, Winkler steered the Journal away from any involvement relating to the growing Nazi culture in Germany and the upcoming war. In its December 12, 1941 issue, published five days after the Japanese attack on Pearl Harbor, the newspaper took a clear stance with a front-page English- and German-language editorial titled “We are all Americans, standing united in the defense of our country” which stated: “[A]ll Americans, regardless of place of birth or former nationality, all American citizens of German blood, stand as one behind their Government in this crisis. The United States are our country, the land of our children and it is our highest duty to defend it.”

In 1953, Winkler handed over management of the Journal to his son Carl H. Winkler. In that same year, Paul Gleis retired and Klaus G. Wust succeeded him as editor. Winkler died on October 5, 1954, followed by longtime editor Gleis, who died eight months later on July 11, 1955.

The Washington Journal continued publication until 2002. In March 2002, it was bought by ONA Publishing Corporation under P.G. Lobl who merged the publication with Amerika Woche of Skokie, Illinois and New Jersey Freie Zeitung, which was bought by ONA in the 1990s. ONA named the newspaper Amerika Woche, sometimes titled Amerika Woche Freie Zeitung Washington Journal, a weekly newspaper still published today in Long Island City, New York.
