= Edward Morwitz =

American journalist

Edward Morwitz (12 June 1815 Danzig, Prussia – 13 December 1893 Philadelphia, Pennsylvania) was a physician and inventor in Germany and a newspaper publisher and physician in the United States.

== Biography ==
=== Germany ===
Morwitz was the son of a wealthy merchant. He studied Semitic languages, Oriental literature, philosophy, theology, and finally medicine at the universities of Halle-Wittenberg, Leipzig, and Berlin. In 1841, he received the degree of M.D. from Berlin and was made first assistant of the Hufeland Clinic there. In 1843, Morwitz made a tour of parts of Germany, France, and Switzerland. On returning to Prussia, he took up his residence in the town of Conitz, where he practised his profession and his specialty in the treatment of nervous and mental disorders. So successful he was at Conitz that he also started and supported a hospital there for the poor. He began writing his Geschichte der Medicin (English: History of Medicine).

His attention to medicine was interrupted by the Revolutions of 1848, when he favored the revolutionaries. His opinions were well known and won him friends, but also enemies. On a certain occasion his carriage was overturned by a group of royalists, and he met with severe injuries, from which, however, he gradually recovered. However, he felt obliged to emigrate.

He had invented a breech-loading gun. Finding no market for this patent in Germany, in 1850 he visited England and the United States, but without success. He soon returned to Europe, but having determined to settle in America, again returned to the United States and settled in Philadelphia in 1852.

=== Philadelphia ===
In 1853 he purchased the German-language newspaper Demokrat, which he went on to edit and published. In his conduct of this daily, Morwitz advocated measures for the improvement of the city, among them the consolidation of its different sections under a single mayor. In 1855, he began the publication of a political weekly called Vereinigte Staaten Zeitung (English: United States Journal), the influence of which was felt in the election of Richard Vaux as Mayor of Philadelphia in 1856. In the same year, Morwitz started a Sunday paper Die Neue Welt (English: The New World), which took the place of a Sunday edition of the Demokrat.

In politics Moritz was an active Democrat, and advocated the election of James Buchanan as President of the United States in 1856. For a few years, he freely ventilated his political views in a paper he had purchased, called the Pennsylvanian. This he sold in 1860, when he recognized dangers arising from the separate nominations of Stephen A. Douglas and John C. Breckinridge as candidates for the presidency. He confined his efforts to the Demokrat, which, thereafter, adopted a neutral policy. He also opened a German dispensary, which, for quite a period, continued its operations among the sick poor.

While, at first, he thought the Civil War might be averted, Morwitz remained loyal to the Union, and helped to organize and equip regiments sent to the field. In 1862 he was active in establishing the German Press Association of Pennsylvania. In 1870 he called a meeting to raise funds for assisting German soldiers during the Franco-Prussian War. About $600,000 was raised throughout the country and sent to Germany. In 1874, Morwitz purchased the Age, a daily newspaper of Philadelphia published in English; but in 1875 he sold it to the Times Publishing Company. He controlled many German- and English-language newspapers in several states, having under his management at one time as many as 300 papers, among them eight dailies.

== Works ==
Morwitz published numerous books, among them:

- History of Medicine (Leipzig, 1845)
- German-American Dictionary (Philadelphia, 1882) at Google Books
