= Der Staats Anzeiger =

Defunct American bilingual German-English newspaper

Der Staats Anzeiger (The State Gazette) was an American German-English language newspaper, first published in 1906. Initially published in Rugby, North Dakota, publication was moved to Devils Lake, North Dakota in 1911, and shortly after that moved to Bismarck, North Dakota, where publication continued until 1945.

The newspaper was successful in linking many of the Germans from Russia who settled in the Great Plains of the United States. The newspaper was also frequently sent abroad, including to Russia. Family members on opposite sides of the world were linked and remained in communication through letters published in Der Staats Anzeiger.

== See also ==
- Dakota Freie Presse
- German American journalism
