= Der Volksfreund =

German language newspaper published in New York

Der Volksfreund (the People's Friend) was a German language newspaper published in Buffalo, New York, on and off from 1868 to 2009. Its editorial tendencies were Roman Catholic and Democratic. The paper flourished chiefly during the last decade of the 19th century until World War I under its publisher Matthias Rohr. Originally a gymnasium professor of modern languages in the Rhenish Palatinate in Germany, Rohr emigrated to the United States and was active as a publisher and insurance agent.

The paper was still being published bilingually in Buffalo, New York, as of 2008. In 2009, Burt Erickson Nelson the paper's publisher since reviving it in 1994, died at age 81. Felice Nelson Krycia assumed the role of editor for the paper's final issue November/December 2009. In August 2012, a new publication, The German Citizen, was begun that became the successor of Der Volksfreund by retaining many of that paper's writers, readers, and maintaining most of the Der Volksfreund's archives.
