= Dakota Freie Presse =

- Type: Weekly newspaper
- Format: Broadsheet
- Founder: Bernhard Quinke
- Founded: April 1878
- Ceased publication: February 24, 1954
- Political alignment: Neutral
- Language: German; English
- Headquarters: Yankton, South Dakota; USA
- Circulation: About 14,000 weekly (as of 1920)
- OCLC number: 10316334

The Dakota Freie Presse or the Dakota Free Press, abbreviated as DFP, was a weekly German language newspaper printed in Yankton, Dakota Territory (now South Dakota). It circulated in the Dakotas and other states, Canada, and Europe, from 1874 to 1954. The newspaper was non-denominational and neutral in politics. The focus of the paper was on Germans from Russia; German settlers in Russian colonies around the Black Sea and, to a lesser degree, along the Volga River; and subsequent settlers in the Dakotas in the United States. The Dakota Freie Presse was published first only in German, but it later began publishing in English.

In 1920, the Der Auslanddeutsche 8 reported that "The Dakota Freie Presse was the recognized organ of the Russian-Germans in America and perhaps in the whole world. As such, it offered largely the private correspondence of its readers. Although these write-ups were superficial and rather insignificant as far as content is concerned, below the surface they had great importance because the identity and cohesion of the ethnic Germans who emigrated from Russia was thereby maintained for nearly fifty years." (Note: Der Auslanddeutsche 8, a bimonthly publication of the Institut für Auslandsbeziehungen (founded in 1917 and known until 1945 as the Deutsches Ausland-Institut) in Stuttgart, Germany, stated in 1920:)

== History ==
The Dakota Freie Presse was founded in April 1874 by Bernhard Quinke.

Johann Christian Wenzlaff took the paper over in 1885 or 1886 and acquired a building lot on Broadway, erecting a brick building to house the printing establishment and editorial room.

From its new base of operations in New Ulm, the DFP, following the Treaty of Versailles in 1919, operated its own relief program for the hungry children of Germany. Editor F. W. Sallet personally sought funds and materials which he shipped to Osterode, East Prussia, where the entire program was administered by the editor's older brother, Daniel Gottfried Sallet, the father of Dr. Richard Sallet who would one day succeed F. W. Sallet in the editor's chair.

Schmidt was listed in the editorial block of the DFP only until September 16, 1942. From March 11 to September 16, 1942, the names of L. Luedtke, A. Hochscheid, and Frau Grete (obviously a pen name) resided in Milwaukee and was responsible for the section, Für Hausfrau, Gattin, und Mutter (for the housekeeper, wife, and mother). After September 16, 1942, only John Brendel was consistently associated with the editorship in Bismarck until Joseph Gaeckle came into the picture for the first time on August 4, 1948.

The Dakota Freie Presse went out of print on February 24, 1954.

== Circulation ==
Initially, it had a very low and only local circulation (295 copies in 1875, 1,200 in 1880, 2,170 in 1890, and 3,400 in 1900), and not until after F. W. Sallet arrived did the paper take on its transregional nature and obtained a skyrocketing circulation (7,500 in 1905, 9,500 in 1910, and nearly 14,000 by 1920).

In 1924, the DFP became the first paper published in the United States to be allowed re-entry into the Soviet Union.

The DFP merged with the Dakota Rundschau in late 1932 or early 1933. However, the Rundschau itself derived from three previous mergers. These mergers were the Eureka Rundschau, a Black Sea German paper owned and published by Gustav Mauser and Otto H. Froh, which was located in Eureka, South Dakota and which began publishing on June 3, 1915; the Bismarck Nordlicht, which began publishing on February 1, 1885; and the Mandan Volkszeitung.

When the DFP disappeared as a visible organ in 1954, it did not entirely cease publication because it was consolidated with the America Herold Zeitung.

== Editors/Owners ==
1. 1874 to 1875: Bernhard Quinke
2. 1875 to 1876: Judge Charles F. Rossteuscher
3. 1876 to 1885: Gustav A. Wetter
4. 1885 or 1886: Johann Christian Wenzlaff
5. 1886 or 1887 to 1892: Salomon Wenzlaff
6. 1892 to 1901: Saloman Wenzlaff and Mr. Krause
7. 1901 to 1903: Krause, Ellerman, Kositzky, and Lusk
8. 1903 to 1932: Friedrich Wilhelm Sallet
9. 1906 to 1908: Gustav Kositzky Ellerman
10. 1931 to 1933: Richard Sallet and F.W. Sallet's three sons
11. 1930s to 1940s: John Brendel, Dr. H.E. Fritsch, and Felix Schmidt
12. 1954: Joseph Gaeckle

== See also ==
- Der Staats Anzeiger
