= Cincinnati Volksfreund =

German-language based in Ohio, US

- Cincinnati Weekly Volksfreund
- Type: Daily and weekly newspaper
- Owner(s): Various (see prose)
- Founder(s): Joseph A. Hemann
- Founded: 1850
- Political alignment: Democratic Party
- Language: German
- Ceased publication: 1908
- Headquarters: Cincinnati, Ohio, United States
- OCLC number: 9664107

The Cincinnati Volksfreund was a daily and weekly German-language newspaper that was based in Cincinnati, Ohio, and published between 1850 and 1908 with offices located on the southwest corner of Vine and Longworth Streets.

The paper was founded in October 1850 by Joseph A. Hemann and his editorials began appearing in March 1853 in the weekly edition, the Cincinnati Wöchentlicher Volksfreund. Originally neutral in politics, the newspaper later became the leading German Democratic newspaper of Ohio.

== Editors and owners ==
- 1850–1863 – Joseph Anton Hemann, founder, publisher, editor
- 1863–1869 – Johann B. Jeup & Co.
- 1870–1871 – Volksfreund Publishing Co.
- 1872–1873 – Limberg & Thilly
- 1873–1879 – Limberg & Heinrich Haacke
- 1880–1908 – Heinrich Haacke and Co.

== See also ==
- Der Wahrheitsfreund
- Hochwächter
