= Tägliches Cincinnatier Volksblatt =

Defunct newspaper

Tägliches Cincinnatier Volksblatt ("Daily Cincinnati People's Paper") was a German-language newspaper which was founded in 1836 and was printed in Cincinnati, Ohio. The paper served the German population of Cincinnati until it published its last issue on December 5, 1919. The newspaper lost support during the WWI period and lost the support of brewing advertisers due to Prohibition. The paper was absorbed by the other Cincinnati German language paper the Freie Presse.
