= Cincinnatier Freie Presse =

German-language newspaper

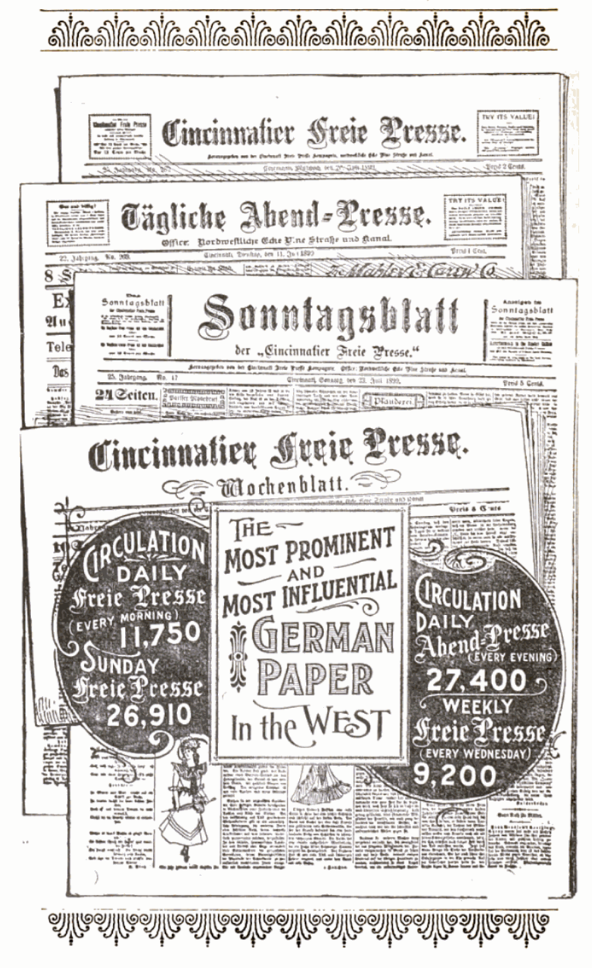
- A 1901 advertisement for the Cincinnatier Freie Presse featuring its different editions
- Type: Daily German language newspaper
- Founded: 1872
- Political alignment: Republican
- Language: German
- Ceased publication: 1964
- Headquarters: Cincinnati
- Circulation: 12,500 (Freie Press); 25,175 (Sonntagsblatt); 27,900 (Abend Presse); 10,250 (Wochenblatt)

Cincinnatier Freie Presse was a German-language newspaper based in Cincinnati, Ohio. It was founded in 1872 as the Cincinnati Courier, and in 1874 re-branded as the Cincinnati Freie Presse. Tägliches Cincinnatier Volksblatt was absorbed into this paper after December 1919. The paper became a weekly in 1941.

As of 1901, the paper published a separate evening edition (Abend Presse), Wednesday edition (Wochenblatt), and Sunday edition (Sonntagsblatt).

The paper's production ended in March, 1964.
