= Elmer Washburn =

Chief of the United States Secret Service (1874–1876)

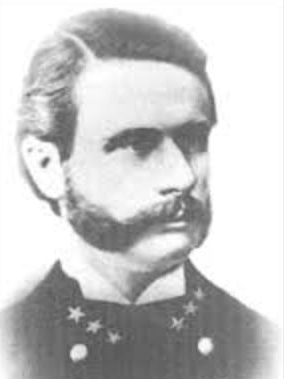

3rd Chief of the United States Secret Service
- In office October 1, 1874 – 1876
- President: Ulysses S. Grant
- Preceded by: Hiram C. Whitley
- Succeeded by: James Brooks

General Superintendent of the Chicago Police Department
- In office July 29, 1872 – December 29, 1873 (interim July 29 – August 12, 1872)
- Mayor: Joseph Medill; Lester L. Bond acting Harvey Doolittle Colvin
- Preceded by: William Wallace Kennedy
- Succeeded by: Jacob Rehm

Supervisor of Lake Township (Cook County)
- In office 1889–1887
- Succeeded by: township abolished

Personal details
- Born: December 25, 1834 East Bridgewater, Massachusetts, U.S.
- Died: November 23, 1918 (aged 83) Chicago, Illinois, U.S.
- Resting place: Oak Woods Cemetery, Chicago

Elmer Washburn (December 25, 1834 – November 23, 1918) was an American politician. He was the 3rd Chief of the United States Secret Service from 1874 through 1876. Before serving as chief of the United States Secret Service, Washburn had headed the Chicago Police Department from 1872 through 1873. He would later run unsuccessfully for mayor of Chicago in 1891.

Washburn was a member of the illustrious Washburn family.

== Early life and career ==
Washburn was born a member of the Washburn family. He was raised in Massachusetts, and in his younger years established a career as a construction engineer.

Washburn moved to Chicago, Illinois, and served as a vision superintendent for the Illinois Central Railroad. He later served as warden of the Joliet Penitentiary.

== General Superintendent of the Chicago Police Department ==
Mayor Joseph Medill had been persuaded by the city's Committee of Seventy, a citizen's group, to fire General Superintendent of Police William Wallace Kennedy and replace him with Washburn. Formally, on July 29, 1872, Kennedy resigned as Chicago's General Superintendent of Police, and the mayor appointed Washburn as interim General Superintendent of Police. On August 12, 1872, he was made permanent General Superintendent. While he had had no experience as either a police nor any experience working with the city of Chicago, he had strong support of the Committee of Seventy who had lobbied the Chicago City Council's Committee on Judiciary and Police hard to approve his appointment.

Washburn's tenure as head of the Chicago Police Department was primarily under the tenure of mayor Joseph Medill. However, he also served during the tenure of acting mayor Lester L. Bond, and in the early days of Harvey Doolittle Colvin's mayoralty.

On October 11, 1872, the police commissioners, under pressure from the Committee of Seventy to enforce blue laws, handed Washburn an order to enforce the blue laws, "as far as practicable".

In partnership with mayor Medill, Washburn cracked-down on gambling in the city.

Washburn made attempts to reform the city's police force, but this was met with resistance in the department, which weakened Washburn's practical authority. Washburn's first attempt at reform was to prohibit police from accepting fines or bail from those they arrested. This order was difficult to enforce, and was inconsistently enforced.

Washburn accused Captain Michael C. Hickey of releasing prisoners and holding recovered stolen goods, and Brought him before the Board of Police Commissioners on these charges. This proved unsuccessful for Washburn, as the case against Hickey fell apart after two days of testimony, and Hickey was restored to the lesser rank of sergeant. This further harmed Washburn's standing with the police force, since Hickey was a well-respected officer. This led to a power struggle in the police department.

During the power struggle within the department, police commissioners challenged Washburn's authority to change patrol duty and order raids on the city's gambling dens. They made an effort to force Washburn's resignation, but he retained enough backing from the Committee of Seventy and mayor Medill to retain his post.

In January 1873, the Chicago City Council passed an ordinance allowing anyone arrested to secure their release by posting a special bail double the amount of the highest fine they could incur. The ordinance allowed the money to be deposited with the officer in charge of the police station they had been taken to, despite this being a practice that Washburn had earlier attempted to stop.

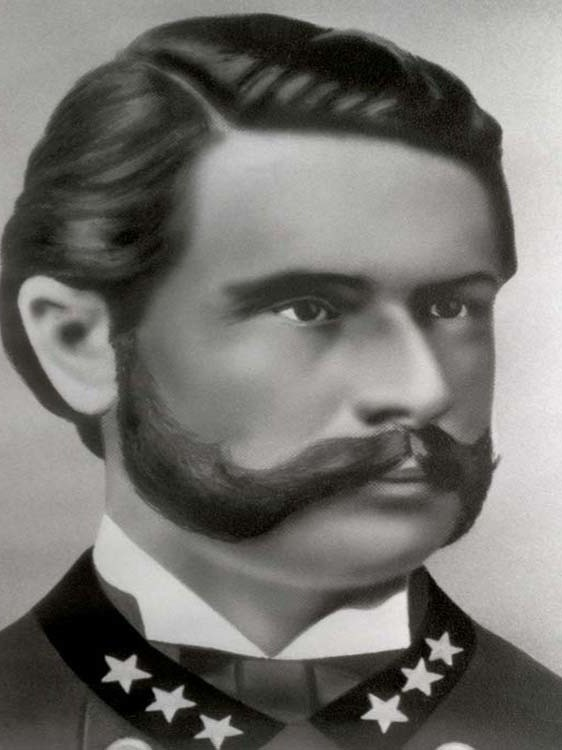
Illustration of Washburn

His association with mayor Medill further harmed Washburn's standing with the police force. Medill had originally vetoed a City Council Ordinance that would allow the City Council to refund the amounts that patrolmen had to pay the City Treasury for items necessary to their duty, such as belts and clubs. He only agreed to sign the ordinance after the City Council agreed to add an amendment that policemen would have to pay for these items if they did not return them in good condition. This episode had engendered resentment among many in the force towards Medill.

Owners of gambling establishments that had been raided by Washburn sued him for the return of gambling implements such as faro tables. The courts ultimately sided with the gambling establishments, finding that, while Washburn had the authority to restrict gambling and to arrest people for practicing it, he did not have the authority to seize property without due process.

=== Power struggle ===
Washburn created another dispute within the department when he made an attempt to require officers to work uninterrupted twelve-hour patrols. Officers submitted a petition to the city council signed by 450 officers and men. The City Council, lacking authority over police work rules, referred the petition to the Board of Police. The Board of Police cited the City Charter of 1866's Rules and Regulations for Patrol Duty, which established a rotation of six-hours shifts and stated that the authority to alter patrol duty laid solely with the board, reached a decision which overruled Washburn. However, Washburn refused to remind this order. In response, on January 27, 1873, the three police commissioners unanimously charged Washburn with "neglect of duty, incompetence, disobedience of the orders of the Board of police; violations of the rules and regulations of the Board by enforcing orders unauthorized by the Board of Police...and conduct unbecoming a police officer." They moved to suspend Washburn pending a trial on these charges, and appointed Police Secretary Ward as acting superintendent.

Washburn still found the strong support of mayor Medill after the commissioner had voted to suspend him and press him with charges. Medill and the city's Corporation Counsel both argued that the state law had given the mayor power to retain officers of the force against the wishes of the board, thus allowing Medill the power to block the board from suspending Washburn. The board objected to this. In response, on January 29, Medill ordered the removal of Commission Klokke. After Klokke argued that he had been elected in November and that the mayor lacked the authority to remove him, Medill responded by removing Commissioner Reno as well. Medill then ordered that officers and patrolmen of the city recognize Washburn as superintendent, and ordered that Washburn resume his duties. After they refused to declare obedience to Washburn, Captains Michael C. Hickey and Fred Gund were promptly dismissed by Medill from the police force. Medill appointed a new captain of the First District, Simon O'Donnell, to replace Hickey. But the sergeants of the First District refused to obey O'Donnell.

On February 4, amid the leadership strife, the Committee of Seventy arranged for a mass meeting to be held to support Medill and Washburn's authority over the police force. The meeting was well attended, and prominent speakers, including former mayor John Wentworth, spoke in support of Medill and Washburn. Ultimately, the department's officers relented to submit to Washburn's command. The City Council backed Medill and Washburn, and upheld Medill's appointment of new commissioners to replace Klokke and Reno. The newly comprised police board dismissed the charges against Washburn. The City Council also upheld the firing of Sergeants Jacob Rehm, Bishoff, Douglass, and Macauley that had followed the orders of the board of commissioners and their Acting Superintendent Ward over the orders of Medill and Washburn. Once they agreed to obey Washburn, Hickey and Gund were rehired.

After this power struggle was resolved, Washburn abandoned the idea of twelve-hour shifts.

=== Later tenure ===
In a 1873 scandal, Milwaukee newspapers accused Washburn of forcing a Wisconsin businessman named Wheeler to pay the police department $200 for the return of stolen goods. While he was eventually cleared of any criminal wrongdoing, a select committee of the Chicago City Council recommended he be censured.

== Chief of the Secret Service ==
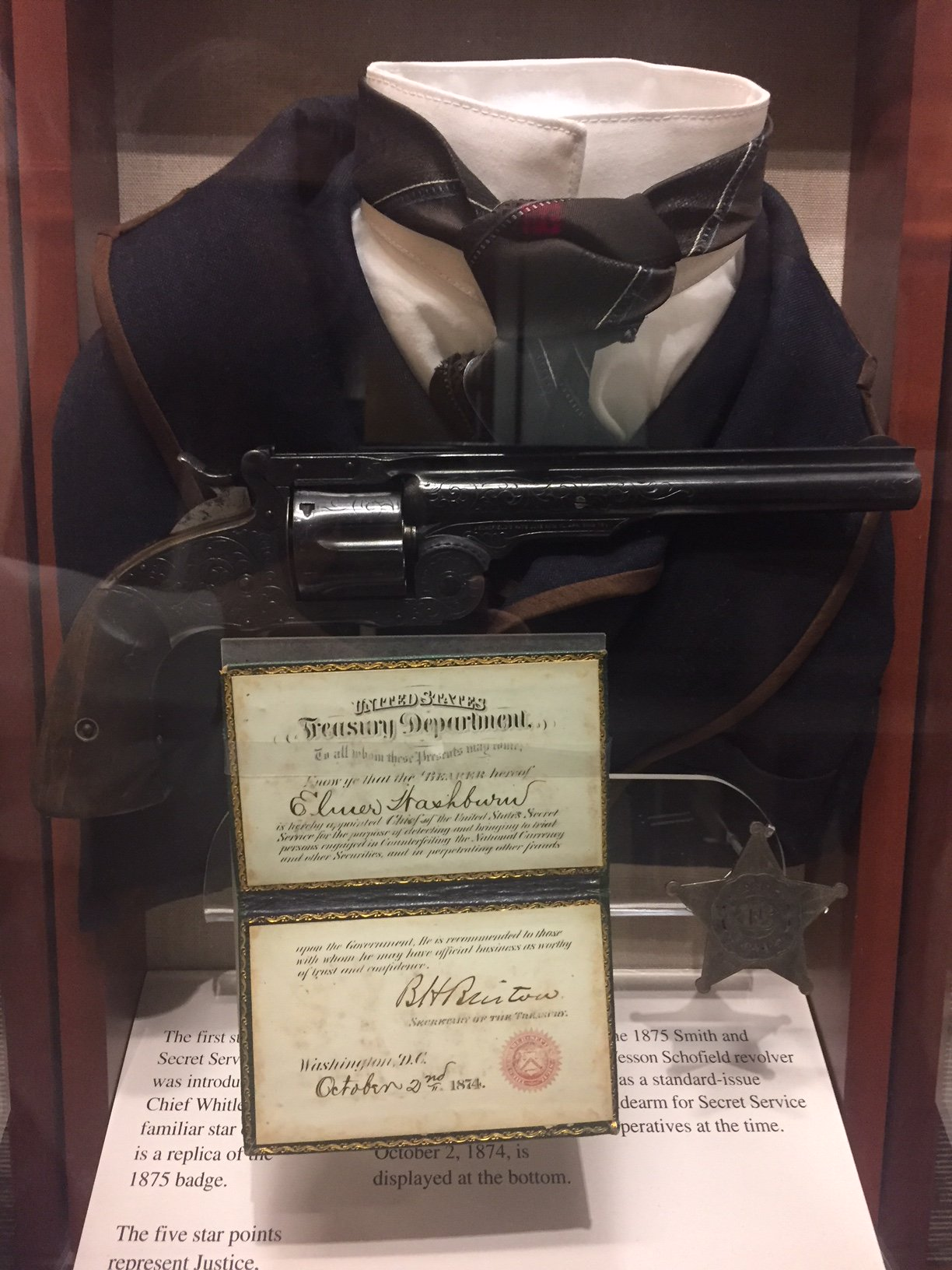
Washburn's 1874 Secret Service credentials on display at the Secret Service's headquarters

Washburn served as chief of the United States Secret Service under president Ulysses S. Grant from 1874 to 1876.

Washburn took office on October 1, 1874.

Washburn helped thwart the attempted theft of Abraham Lincoln's corpse. He also played a role in prosecution of Whiskey Ring members.

== Subsequent life and career ==
Washburn became involved in the Union Stock Yards, heading the Chicago Live Stock Exchange and serving as president of the Union Stock Yards National Bank for many years. He also served as head of Chicago's Live Stock Exchange.

In March 1884, Washburn lobbied the US Congress against the bill which created the Bureau of Animal Industry, and helped to weaken the agency's ultimate authority. However, by late 1886, he had been persuaded to now side in favor of having a more powerful agency operate in place of the Bureau of Animal Agency.

In 1887, Washburn was elected Supervisor (township executive) of Lake Township a then-suburban township in Cook County, Illinois. Washburn unsuccessfully ran in the 1891 Chicago mayoral election, in which he placed fourth and was defeated by his cousin once-removed Hempstead Washburne.

Washburn died in Chicago at the age of 84 on November 25, 1918.

== Electoral history ==
1887 Lake Township Supervisor election
Party	Candidate	Votes	%
City	Elmer Washburn	4,226	58.50
Union Labor	Peter McGurn (incumbent)	2,998	41.50
Total votes		7,224	100

1891 Chicago mayoral election
Party	Candidate	Votes	%
Republican	Hempstead Washburne	46,957	28.84
Democratic	DeWitt Clinton Cregier (incumbent)	46,558	28.59
Independent Democrat	Carter Harrison III	42,931	26.36
Citizens	Elmer Washburn	24,027	14.75
Socialist Labor	Thomas J. Morgan	2,376	1.46
Total votes		162,849	100
