= Michael Cassius McDonald =

American crime boss (1839–1907)

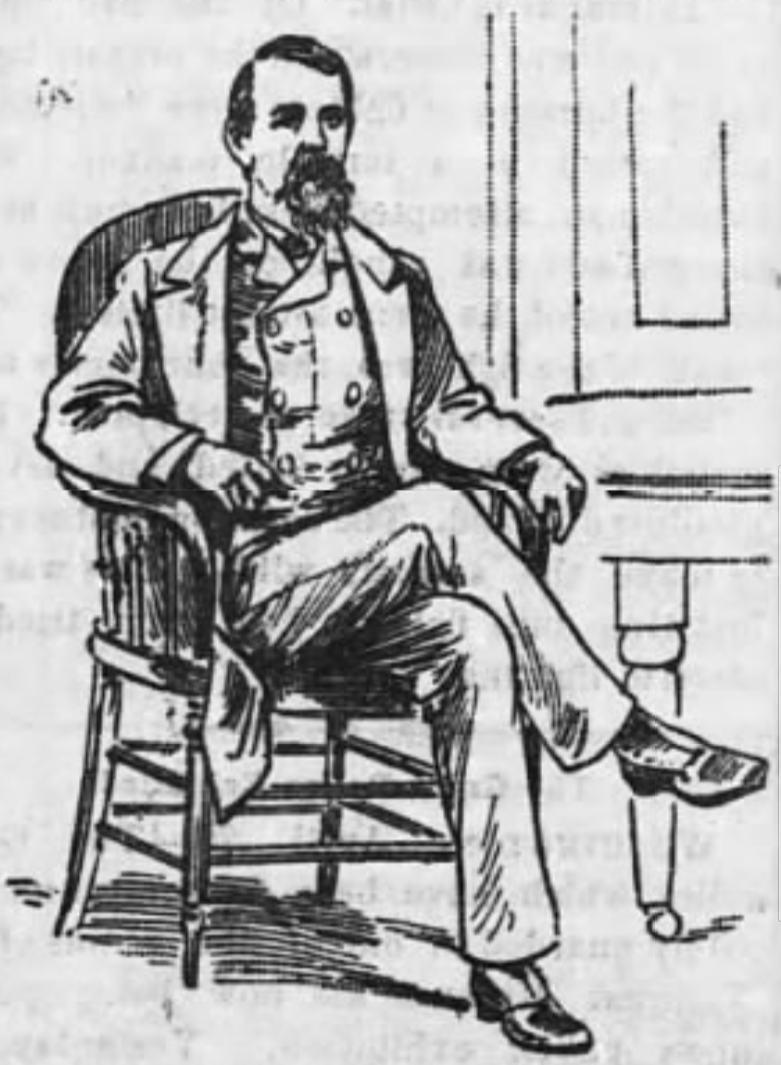
- sketch of McDonald, circa the 1880s
- Born: c. 1839; Niagara Falls, New York, US
- Died: August 9, 1907 (aged 67–68); Chicago, Illinois, US
- Burial place: Mount Olivet Cemetery
- Occupations: Crime boss, political boss, businessman
- Political party: Democratic
- Spouses: Mary Ann Noonan (m. 1871; div. 1889) Dora Barkley (m. 1895)
- Children: 3

Michael Cassius McDonald (c. 1839 – August 9, 1907) was a crime boss, political boss, and businessman based out of Chicago. He is considered to have introduced organized crime to the city, and to have also established its first political machine. At the height of his power, he had influence over politicians of all levels in the state of Illinois.

McDonald permanently settled in Chicago as an adult sometime after the American Civil War. McDonald ran gambling parlors in the city. As a crime boss, he developed a system in which he would guarantee the city's gambling dens and brothels protection from interference in exchange for payment. A Democrat, McDonald was involved in the city's politics, and, at his peak, wielded massive influence over it. McDonald was also involved in numerous business ventures. He was one of the principal figures behind the Lake Street Elevated Railroad Company, which built the Lake Street Elevated rapid transit line in Chicago.

In the mid-1890s, McDonald retired from the gambling business, and his gambling circuit deconsolidated under the leadership of several different crime bosses.

== Early life and family ==
McDonald was born in Niagara Falls, New York in 1839. McDonald and his family lived in an Irish enclave of Niagara County, New York.

McDonald father was Edward "Ed" McDonald. As a young man, Ed McDonald had immigrated to Canada from County Cork, Ireland as a stowaway. The elder McDonald then worked in Quebec as a laborer, before immigrating again into the United States, settling in Niagara County in 1837. Ed McDonald became a loyal member of the Democratic Party which was relatively new at the time.

McDonald's mother was born in Limerick, Ireland with the maiden name of Mary Guy. She was a religious woman. She wed Ed McDonald in Niagara, and had three children, Michael, Mary, and Edward Jr. Functionally illiterate, she would require her children to attend parochial school during the week and mass on Sundays.

McDonald's father was a strict disciplinarian who regularly administered corporal punishment to his children for misbehavior.

The younger McDonald, despite his father's urging, refused to pursue a job as a bootmaker's apprentice.

In the autumn of 1854, a fifteen year old McDonald traveled to Chicago on a two-week trip. He returned to Chicago two years later along with four friends from school. In Chicago he worked as a "train butcher", selling candy and goods to train passengers. He committed a number of swindles while working. In 1860, he quit train butchering, and moved to New Orleans. In New Orleans he took note of the gambling culture there.

During the American Civil War, he organized groups of fraudulent enlistees who enlisted under false aliases multiple times to collect the $500 bounties. In this scheme, he colluded with army deserters, who had agreed to turn themselves in, to then reenlist, and then split the commission which McDonald received for recruiting them.

== Return to Chicago ==
Sometime after the American Civil War he returned to Chicago. After having spent some time financing a traveling faro bank, in 1867, McDonald opened his first gambling establishment at 89 Dearborn street. In November 1868, the Chicago Tribune reported McDonald's arrest, along with national billiards champion John McDevitt and two other gamblers, for criminal conspiracy and the running of gambling dens after having apparently fleeced an intoxicated man out of more than $400 while playing faro. In 1869, he was arrested for allegedly stealing $30,000 from an assistant cashier of the Chicago Dock Company. The cashier had given the money to McDonald to finance his gambling operations. McDonald was unable to afford bail, and, consequentially, spent three months in prison prior to being acquitted at his trial. Because of the expense spent on his criminal trial, McDonald had trouble paying protection payments to the police, and, as a result, his gambling operation was frequently raided, and McDonald was repeatedly arrested and fined. This fostered McDonald's lifelong disdain for police.

McDonald had a common-law marriage, until his common-law wife ran away to join a convent in St. Louis.

In the 1871 Great Chicago Fire, McDonald lost the entirety of his real estate and businesses, which were uninsured. Within a few weeks of the fire, McDonald managed to raise enough funds to establish a saloon at State Street and Harrison Street, where illegal card games were featured.

On December 5, 1871, McDonald married Mary Ann Noonan, a divorcee with two children from her previous marriage.

== Criminal and political rule in Chicago ==
In the mid-1870s, McDonald would engage in a number of ventures which would make him a multi-millionaire by the mid-1880s.

In 1873, McDonald opened a gaming parlor named "The Store". It was a four-floor building located at the northwest corner of the intersection of North Clark Street and West Monroe Street. This was McDonald's first major business venture. "The Store" proved to be an instant success. The games were rigged, but it became a gambling mecca and a major attraction in the city. It contained a saloon, hotel, and a fine dining establishment in addition to its games. Some sources attribute the origin of the famous phrase "there's a sucker born every minute" to McDonald, who reportedly said it in response to concerns a crony voiced about whether the parlor could attract enough customers to fill the large number of gaming tables in the venue.

McDonald developed a system under which he was paid tribute by the city's gambling establishments and brothels, and, in exchange, would use his influence to ensure that they could operate without police interference.

McDonald's criminal activities in the 1870s and 1880s are considered to mark the beginning of organized crime in the city of Chicago. He is considered to have been Chicago's first mob boss. His crime syndicate would make him significant amounts of revenue. He would also receive regular critical press from many of the city's newspapers, contributing to his notoriety.

Another profitable venture which McDonald ran was a bail bond business. Through this business, he was also able to garner connections with many of the city's criminals.

McDonald became involved in Chicago's politics, forming a political organization that was dubbed the "gambler's trust". This is considered to have been Chicago's first political machine. Some consider his political activities to have laid the base upon which the city's modern Democratic Party was built. In 1873, by which time McDonald was well-established in the criminal underbelly of Chicago, he organized the successful mayoral campaign of his close friend Harvey Doolittle Colvin. Colvin's victory garnered McDonald great influence in the city. McDonald, thus, gained a friend in the mayor's office, as opposed to the previous anti-gambling mayor Joseph Medill, who had made many efforts at reform in the city. McDonald's political influence experienced a setback when Chicago elected reform mayor Monroe Heath in 1876. However, a McDonald-backed candidate would soon return to the mayor's office. Appreciating his liberal views on liquor consumption and gambling, McDonald supported Carter Harrison Sr. for mayor in the 1879 Chicago mayoral election, playing a major role in Harrison's election as mayor. McDonald would come to have many of the city's politicians under his influence. By the peak of his influence, he would receive the nickname "King Mike", and would brag that he "ran the town" and had the city's police department "under his thumb". McDonald established an alliance between the city's gambling interests and its politicians which saw some illegal gaming revenue used to fund Democratic Party political operations. As a political boss, he became so powerful in the city's Democratic Party, that, for some time, he held an effective veto over the selection of candidates to be the party's nominees for election in the city.

While mayor, Monroe Heath ordered raids on McDonald's gambling operations. On November 23, 1878, there was a police raid on McDonald's personal apartment, located on the third floor of "the Store". McDonald was not home, but his wife Mary was. Mary hated cops, and fired a gunshot from a pistol that pierced a police officer's coat, but missed him. She also dropped an iron bar down the stairs onto another policeman, injuring his back, but despite some later claims that she killed a cop during the raid, an article in the Chicago Tribune states otherwise. She was arrested and charged with assault with intent to kill, but on December 2 the judge dismissed the case because he said the police violated the law by raiding a private residence without a warrant. Amid these raids, he had his saloon license briefly revoked, but it was restored within a week.

After the shooting incident, McDonald moved his wife and two children out of "The Store" and into a mansion that was built for them on Ashland Avenue, near Mayor Harrison's own residence. However, months later, Mary McDonald left her husband to pursue a relationship with a notable minstrel singer in San Francisco. McDonald went to San Francisco to pursue them, and this was treated as an item of great amusement by Chicago's newspapers. Ultimately, he found his wife and her lover, and Mary asked McDonald to take her back. The two returned to Chicago.

In 1882, McDonald was indicted for running a gaming house, but was able to get off, in part due to bribed witnesses.

In 1882, McDonald bought the short-lived newspaper the Chicago Globe. He sought to utilize the newspaper to influence both elections and to persuade the passage of municipal ordinances that he favored.

At a private meeting held at the White House, McDonald was able to convince Chester A. Arthur to pardon a colleague of his who had been convicted in a pyramid scheme.

Around the year 1885, McDonald created a book-making syndicate which held control of gambling at racetracks in Chicago and Indiana. The most notable racetrack was Garfield Park Racetrack.

In 1885, McDonald claimed to be retiring from the gambling business. In early 1885, McDonald also said he was going to retire from politics. Both would prove not to be the case, and he would remain involved in politics until his death and would not retire from the gambling business until roughly a decade later.

In February 1885, a month before the 1885 Chicago mayoral election, a grand jury found McDonald's right-hand man Joseph Mackin and others with connections to Harrison guilty of election fraud in the 1884 elections, creating a scandal for Harrison ahead of being up for reelection. Despite the fact that no personal wrongdoing on Harrison's part was involved in these charges, the charges against Mackin and others compounded with the preexisting rumors relating to Harrison to foster a public sentiment that challenged Harrison's popularity. While he won a narrow reelection in 1885, the loss popularity from these scandals contributed to Harrison's decision to not seek reelection to a fifth term in the 1887 Chicago mayoral election.

Various contracting firms which McDonald owned would receive sweetheart deals from the city government, thanks to a number of alderman popularly dubbed "Mike McDonald's Democrats". Often, these services were never even rendered by the shell companies which McDonald owned. In the 1880s, McDonald and a business partner were awarded the contract to supply the stone for the new city hall structure being built to provide a permanent replacement to the courthouse and city hall annex which had been lost during the Great Chicago Fire. In 1887, McDonald successfully bribed the Chicago City Council and Cook County Board of Commissioners to give him a contract to paint the city's court house with a compound that, in actuality, was only chalk and water. He charged $128,250 for this work. Some went to prison for participation in this fraud, but the powerful McDonald did not even face any prosecution for his role. However, this created scandal after a newspaper investigation discovered this, and it tarnished McDonald's image, leaving him with the local title of "King of the Boodlers". In 1887, as a result of this scandal, former General Superintendent of the Chicago Police Department Wiliam J. McGargile was convicted of complicity in a Cook County graft ring, including bribes from McDonald. He escaped to Canada, and, two years later, would return to Chicago, exonerated of all 23 pending indictments following the payment of a token $1,000 fine. In the aftermath of the scandal, McDonald largely withdrew for a while, even selling "The Store". The tarnish of scandal in which McDonald had found himself in was another contributing factor to Carter Harrison's decision not to run in the 1887 mayoral election.

During the 1887 mayoral election, in which there was resultingly no Democratic nominee, McDonald supported Republican John A. Roche over the Socialist Labor Party's nominee Robert S. Nelson.

By the mid-1880s, McDonald had invested in the transit company of Charles Yerkes. In 1888, partnering with Yerkes and Colonel Alberger, McDonald began to push plans for the Lake Street Elevated, being involved in the Lake Street Elevated Railroad Company. While not one of the official incorporators of the company, he was a key figure in it. In December of that year, after McDonald bribed thirteen members of the Chicago City Council, it approved an ordinance allowing construction of the rapid transit line by approving a 25-year franchise. Construction began that same month. Regular passenger service began on the Lake Street Elevated on November 6, 1893. Gambling circles nicknamed the rapid transit line "Mike's Upstairs Railroad".

Since they reunited, McDonald had become distant from his wife Mary, being away on business much of the time. Mary busied herself with religion, even building an altar in their Ashland Avenue home and having a private priest hired to administer sacred rights and say mass. On August 9, 1889, McDonald's wife Mary departed to elope to Paris with Reverend John Moysant, the priest at Notre Dame de Chicago, who McDonald had hired to be Mary's personal chaplain. In the aftermath of this, McDonald would renounce his Catholic faith. On September 11, 1889, McDonald filed in Superior Court of Cook County for divorce from Mary. He requested full custody of their two children, arguing that Mary was "unfit". McDonald and his wife Mary had two children together, Guy Cassius and Cassius Michael, who were, respectively, the ages of 9 and 4 at the time the divorce was filed. In the divorce suit, A. S. Trude served as his solicitor and A.B. Jenks as his counsel.

In the 1891 Chicago mayoral election, ahead of the Democratic nominating convention, McDonald supported incumbent mayor DeWitt Clinton Cregier for re-nomination over Carter Harrison, the latter of whom was seeking to make a comeback and win a fifth nonconsecutive term as mayor. Cregier would win renomination, but would lose the general election after Harrison ran an independent campaign, helping to split the Democratic Party vote. In October 1892, McDonald came out in support of Benjamin Harrison for reelection as president.

By the time of the 1893 Chicago mayoral election, McDonald had a longstanding feud with Carter Harrison Sr., who was again seeking election to a fifth nonconsecutive term. In the Democratic mayoral primary, McDonald backed Washington Hesing against Harrison. Harrison won the Democratic nomination. In the general election, McDonald attempted to reconcile with Harrison, who refused McDonald's overtures. Despite this, during the election, rumors arose that Harrison had received McDonald's support in exchange for agreeing that, as mayor, he would provide McDonald a license to operate the Garfield Park Racetrack. Harrison won election, but was assassinated months later by a disgruntled office-seeker named Patrick Eugene Prendergast.

During the 1893 World's Columbian Exposition in Chicago, McDonald made the demand that pickpockets and hustlers avoid the area near to the world's fair in order to avoid tarnishing the city's image.

In the mid-1890s, McDonald retired from the gambling business. After he retired from gambling, the gambling circuit deconsolidated, and became divided between numerous bosses governing different territories.

== Later years ==
McDonald's last decade saw much family turmoil.

In the winter of 1895, McDonald's father Ed McDonald died.

Around New Year's 1895, McDonald married 25-year old Flora "Dora" Feldman McDonald. The daughter of a rabbi, she was burlesque dancer before marrying McDonald. McDonald had known her when she was a child, as she had been a schoolmate of his sons. Moreover, at the time McDonald began a public affair with her, she was married to professional baseball player Sam Barkley. So, McDonald gave Barkley $30,000 to help persuade him to agree to divorce her. McDonald and Dora wed in a Catholic church in Milwaukee, Wisconsin. However, McDonald, at Flora's urging, renounced his lifelong Catholic faith and converted to Judaism. They initially kept their marriage a secret until Chicago newspapers learned of it after they attended a show together at Hooley's Theatre. McDonald also adopted her son Harold Barkley.

There were disputes within McDonald's blended family. McDonald's sons did not appreciate that their childhood playmate had become their stepmother and that a complete stranger had been adopted as their stepbrother. At the age of 19, McDonald's son Guy, wanting to escape the drama-filled household, married his girlfriend over his father's objections and threats to disinherit him if he did. Additionally, McDonald's ex-wife Mary reentered the picture. Dora took Guy to court over improper letters she believed he had written her, but the court dropped the case when it was revealed that Mary was actually the author of these letters.

McDonald's wife Dora had begun began a sexual affair with a thirteen year old high school student (fifteen years her junior) named Webster Guerin. After a decade long affair with him, she suspected Guerin of seeing other women. On February 21, 1907, Dora Feldman McDonald went to Guerin's picture studio in Chicago Loop, where an argument broke out between the two. She fired a single gunshot into Guerin. When people, having heard the gunshot, arrived at the studio, she attempted to claim that he had shot himself. Guerin died from the gunshot. Five minutes after she shot Guerin, police officer Clifton Woodridge (one of Chicago's top detectives) arrived at the studio, having, unrelatedly, come to investigate reports of questionable business practices. Dora Feldman McDonald was arrested for murder. She admitted to police that she had murdered him, but told McDonald she had only done so because she was being blackmailed. He claimed she had told him the morning she shot Guerin that she was being blackmailed, and that she intended to resolve it. McDonald stood by his wife, and used his influence to delay the trial. The killing became international news. The trial was anticipated by some in the media to be even more sensationalized than the murder trial of Harry Kendall Thaw for the killing of Stanford White.

Dora Feldman McDonald's mental health condition worsened while she was in jail awaiting trial, and some close to her feared her to be suicidal. She had previously experienced frequent psychotic episodes in her youth. Her mental health was evaluated multiple times while in jail.

== Death ==
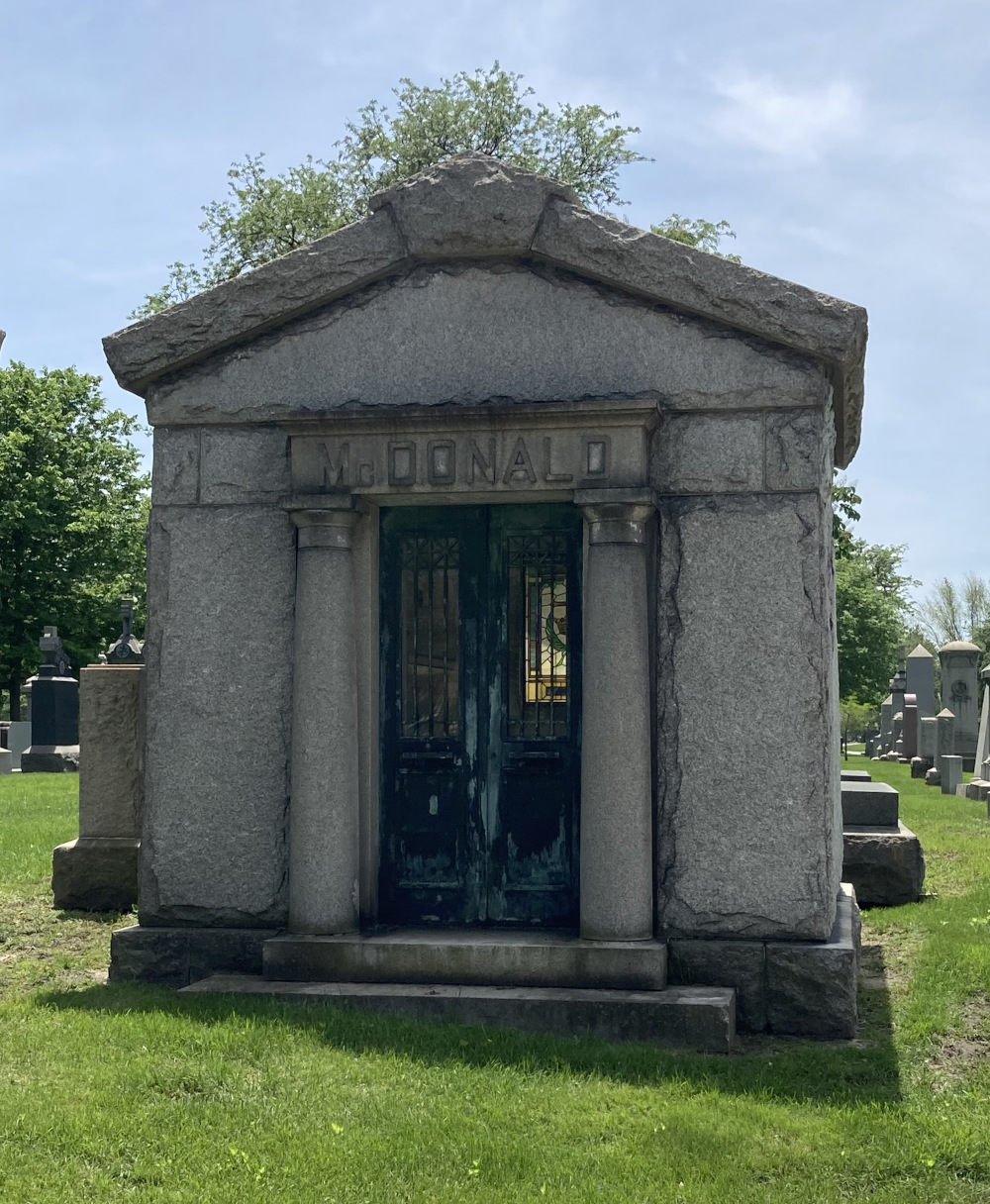
McDonald mausoleum at Mount Olivet Cemetery

McDonald died in Chicago on August 9, 1907. At his side when he died was his ex-wife Mary. He owned $2 million in assets at the time of his death. He had set up a $25,000 legal defense fund to pay for his widow Dora's legal defense, a significant amount of money in that day. This paid for a legal team with notable lawyers, led by A. S. Trude. Her lawyers argued that she had shot Guerin in self-defense. Ultimately, in January 1908, his widow would be acquitted after only five hours of deliberation by a jury.

Soon after his death, his ex-wife Mary attempted to contest Dora McDonald's inheritance. Mary McDonald asserted that she had still been legally married to McDonald at the time of his death, and that Dora McDonald's marriage to him was therefore invalid. This lawsuit was settled in favor of Dora McDonald in May 1908.

McDonald was interred in a mausoleum at Mount Olivet Cemetery in Chicago.

== Portrayal in pop culture ==
McDonald's elegant and flamboyant dress inspired the appearance of the character Gaylord Ravenal in Edna Ferber's 1926 book Show Boat. The book was quickly adapted into the musical of the same name, and the musical has seen several film, radio and television adaptions.
