= 1887 Chicago mayoral election =

- April 5, 1887
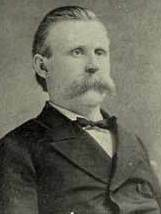

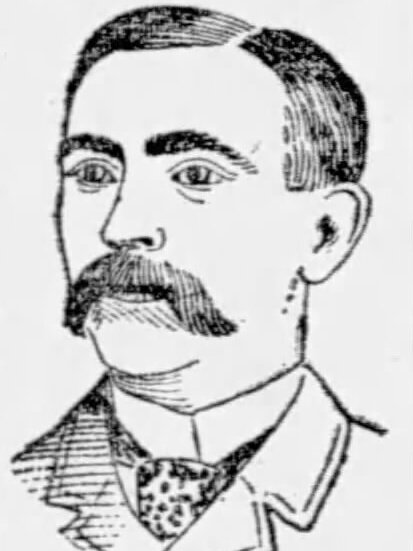
Nominee	John A. Roche	Robert S. Nelson
Party	Republican	United Labor
Popular vote	51,249	23,490
Percentage	68.23%	31.27%
Mayor before election
Carter Harrison III
Democratic
Elected mayor
John A. Roche
Republican

The Chicago mayoral election of 1887 saw Republican John A. Roche win by a landslide, receiving more than a two-thirds majority of the vote, defeating United Labor Party nominee Robert S. Nelson by more than 36 points (a margin of victory which was itself greater than Nelson's vote share), in a race where the Democratic Party had failed to field a candidate.

== Lack of Democratic nominee ==
Incumbent Democratic mayor Carter Harrison III had opted to retire from the mayoralty instead of seeking re-election to a fifth term. He did so recognizing that he had already lost the backing of his party, and would have difficulty securing re-nomination. The loss of Democratic backing for a prospective 1887 Harrison candidacy was in reaction to an decline in overall approval towards Harrison from voters. Harrison's public favor (and his support from his party) had been significantly hurt by dissatisfaction with his handling of the Haymarket Riot. Harrison's handling of the Haymarket Riot had also harmed his standing with conservative business groups. Furthermore, his decision not to seek reelection was influenced by a scandal involving criminal charges of election fraud against some of his supporters (for conduct during the previous mayoral election). Even though these charges had little to do with Harrison's own conduct, there was concern that public awareness of the scandal could provide a salient basis for Republicans to persuade voters into regarding Harrison as corrupt.

Before Harrison decided to retire, he had unsuccessfully attempted to persuade the United Labor Party to support him for re-election and to partner with the city Democratic Party to nominate a joint-slate. Harrison proposed a fusion nomination arrangement that would have seen the parties nominate identical tickets. Harrison's failure to persuade Chicago's United Labor Party to partner with city Democrats further harmed Harrison's support within the local Democratic party.

The Democratic Party initially nominated DeWitt Clinton Cregier to be its nominee for mayor. However, Cregier declined the nomination, refusing to run. After this (and despite his declared intent to retire) the party voted to re-nominate Harrison. Harrison initially accepted the nomination. However, before he could begin campaigning, his wife died. Experiencing great grief over his wife's passing, he withdrew from the election. The Democratic Party found itself unable to find a replacement nominee, and consequentially fielded no nominee.

The election was the first of only two elections between 1879 and early 1893 in which Carter Harrison III was not a candidate (the other being the 1889 election. It was also one of only two mayoral elections in the same timespan with a Republican victory, with 1891 being the only other instance.

== Campaign ==
Republican nominee John A. Roche ran as a fiscally conservative "law-and-order" candidate. Roche was regarded by many Democrats to be the lesser of two evils. The United Labor Party nominated Robert S. Nelson, who (in the absence of a Democratic nominee) was Roche's sole opponent in the election. During the campaign, the Republicans tried to deride Nelson and his party as "socialists". Behind-the-scenes, Roche received unlikely support from some Democrats such as Michael Cassius McDonald. Incumbent mayor Harrison, while formally not backing either candidate, dismissed many Democrats' worries about the prospect of a Nelson mayoralty, and also cautioned that a Roche election could spur the passage of additional blue laws. Harrison went as far as indicating that he leaned more in favor of Nelson among the two candidates, saying, "Nelson is a representative of the laboring men, and Roche tried to be. Nelson is not a socialist. A young party is on its good behavior, and if Nelson were elected he would do his very best for himself and his party." Some prominent Chicagoans such as John M. Smyth spoke with the impression that Harrison outright supported Nelson's candidacy.

== Results ==
Roche received a roughly 27,000-vote margin-of-victory, which at the time was the greatest number of votes that had ever separated a Chicago mayoral winner from an election's runner-up.

1887 Chicago mayoral election
Party	Candidate	Votes	%
Republican	John A. Roche	51,249	68.23
United Labor	Robert S. Nelson	23,490	31.27
Prohibition	Joseph L. Whitlock	372	0.50
Turnout		75,111	
