= An Open Secret: The Family Story of Robert and John Gregg Allerton =

Biographical book

An Open Secret: The Family Story of Robert and John Gregg Allerton is a biography of Robert Allerton and John Gregg. It focuses on the relationship of Allerton and Gregg.
