= Jacob Rehm =

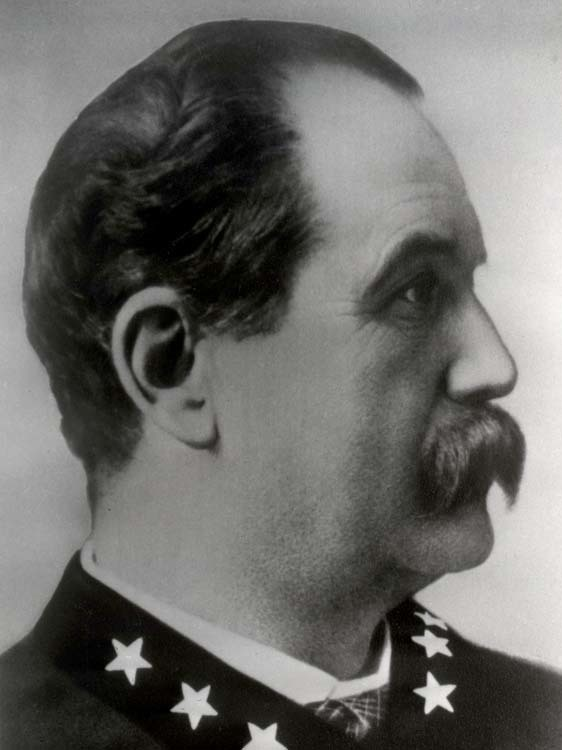

General Superintendent of the Chicago Police Department
- In office December 22, 1873 – October 4, 1875
- Mayor: Harvey D. Colvin
- Preceded by: Elmer Washburn
- Succeeded by: Michael C. Hickey
- In office January 13, 1866 – 1871
- Mayor: John B. Rice; Roswell B. Mason
- Succeeded by: William Wallace Kennedy
- Acting; November 1865–January 13, 1866
- Mayor: John B. Rice
- Preceded by: William Turtle
- In office February 20, 1863 – July 3, 1863
- Mayor: Francis C. Sherman
- Preceded by: Cyrus Parker Bradley
- Succeeded by: William Turtle; Cyrus Parker Bradley (interim)

Cook County Treasurer
- In office 1861–1865
- Preceded by: Augustus H. Boyden
- Succeeded by: Jesse M. Allen

City Marshall of Chicago
- In office March 1, 1859 – March 5, 1860
- Mayor: John C. Haines
- Preceded by: James M. Donnelly
- Succeeded by: Iver Lawson

Personal details
- Born: December 7, 1828 Gerstheim, France
- Died: April 6, 1915 (aged 86)

Jacob Rehm (December 7, 1828 – April 6, 1915) was a policeman, politician, and businessman served several tenures as the head of the Chicago Police Department. He also served as Cook County treasurer from 1861 through 1865.

He was also involved in crime schemes, being sentenced to six months of prison in 1876 for his role in Chicago's segment of the Whiskey Ring.

Rehm later was involved in building and operating streetcars on the city's North Side.

== Early life ==
Rehm was born December 7, 1828, in Gerstheim, located in the Alsace region of France.

In 1840, at the age of twelve, he immigrated with his parents to Chicago.

== First tenure in the police department (1855–1860) ==
In 1855, Rehm was appointed Chicago's street commissioner. That same year, Rehm was appointed the Chicago Police Department's first deputy superintendent in 1855. He also became the Police Captain of the North Side.

In 1857, Rehm briefly served as First Lieutenant.

In 1858, he became the City Hall Police Captain.

From March 1, 1859, through March 5, 1860, Rehm served as City Marshall, the head of the Chicago Police Department.

After resigning from the police force in 1860, he worked with a brewery.

== Tenure as county treasurer (1861–1865), and second tenure in the police department (1861–1863) ==
From 1861 through 1865, he served as Cook County treasurer

On March 27, 1861, Rehm was appointed by the newly-established police board as Deputy Superintendent of Police. This came after the department had ended the position of City Marshall, but before they had yet to appoint a General Superintendent of Police to be the new head of police. This put Rehm as a de facto head of the police force. On April 6, the board appointed Cyrus P. Bradley to assist Rehm in supervising the police force. They, effectively, jointly headed the police force until April 23, when the board appointed Bradley the General Superintendent of Police. Rehm worked with Bradley to create a more effective police force, aiming to create a professional force with a standardized image. Together, they introduced physical requirements for all men hired for the force. They also reintroduced police uniforms, creating uniforms copied after those of the New York City Metropolitan Police. They put into place rules about what facial hair policemen would be permitted to sport. Rehm and Bradley also acquired reputations for severely disciplining their men.

Rehm succeeded Bradley as the general superintendent of police, serving from February 20, 1863, until July 3, 1863. After this, he became involved with a brewery again, and founded his own brewery in 1865 which bore his name.

== Third tenure in the police department (1865–1872) ==
After William Turtle resigned as general superintendent of police in November 1865, and Rehm was appointed to the position again. He served until 1871. He served on an interim basis from November 1865 until January 13, 1866, after which point he was appointed permanently. In 1867, a major labor strike occurred in Chicago over demands for an eight-hour day, and Rehm was tasked with keeping the peace.

On February 8, 1869, he was appointed to additionally serve a five-year term as an inaugural commissioner of Lincoln Park.

Beginning in 1871, Rehm joined the Chicago Police Board. He retired from the board in May of the following year. He was replaced on the board by Ernest Klokke.

In the 1871 municipal elections, he was involved with the "Fireproof" ticket, which elected Joseph Medill in the mayoral race.

In 1872, Rehm (at the time a sergeant) was forced to resign from the police force after improperly releasing a prisoner.

== Fourth tenure in the police department ==
Rehem rejoined the police force as a sergeant, but was fired again in 1873 for obeying the police commissioners over embattled General Superintendent Elmer Washburn.

For the 1873 election cycle, Rehm was politically involved with the People's Party. The party's mayoral candidate that year, Harvey D. Colvin, was successful.

== Fifth tenure in the department (1875) ==
At the request of Michael C. McDonald, a crime boss influential in Chicago politics who was friendly with Rehm, newly-elected mayor Colvin appointed Rehm to again as general superintendent of police. Rehm was appointed after Elmer Washburn resigned. During this tenure, in exchange for $30,000, Rehm provided McDonald access to confidential police records.

=== Whiskey ring scandal, resignation, and conviction ===
McDonald and Rehm also collaborated as part of the Whiskey Ring, in which they would siphon federal tax dollars from alcohol tax and would funnel the money into Rehm's personal bank accounts, as well as bank accounts of Anton C. Hesing and other political allies of McDonald. Rehm resigned as general superintendent of police on October 4, 1875, embroiled in scandal. Rehm would ultimately serve six months of prison time and pay a $10,000 fine for his role in the Whiskey Ring. His sentencing came on July 7, 1876.

== Private sector career ==
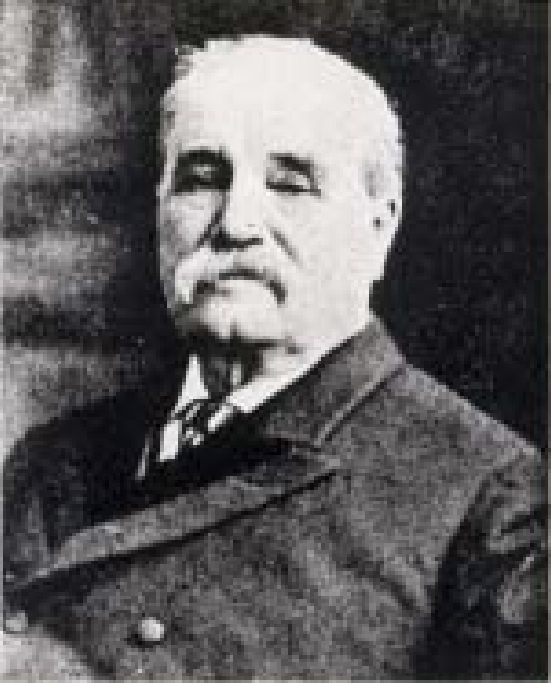
Late portrait of Rehm

Rehm was involved with the construction of the North Side streetcars. Among the streetcar companies he was invested in were the North Chicago City Railway and the North Division Railway Company. He was also involved in the leadership of such companies.

In 1891, Rehm built an August Fiedler-designed mansion in Chicago's Gold Coast neighborhood.

== Death ==
Rehm died March 6, 1915, of paralysis.

== See also ==
- Political corruption in Illinois
