= Samuel W. Allerton =

Samuel Waters Allerton
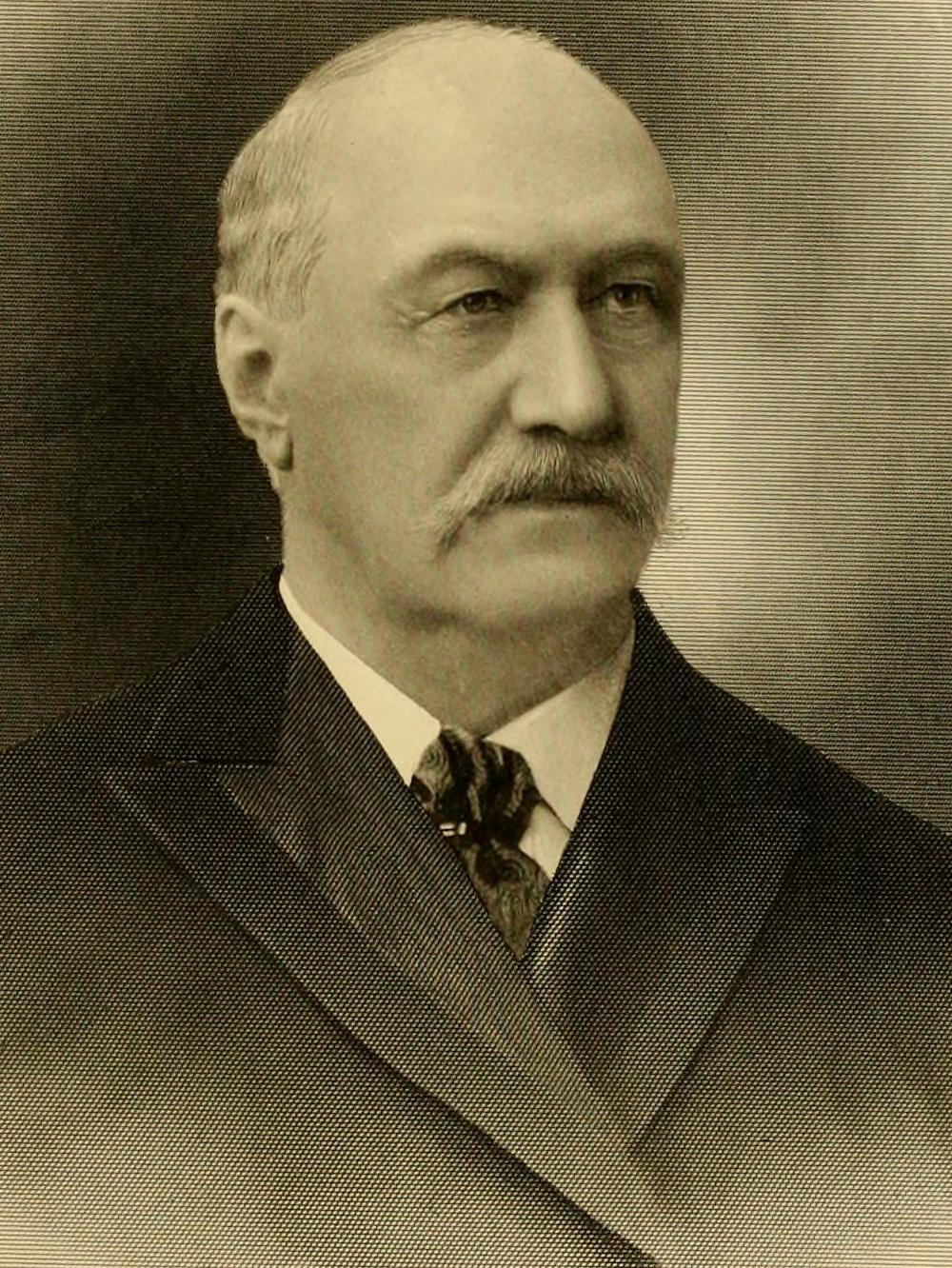
- Born: May 26, 1828; Amenia, New York
- Died: February 22, 1914 (aged 85); South Pasadena, California
- Burial place: Graceland Cemetery
- Occupation: Businessman
- Political party: Republican
- Spouses: Pamilla Wigdon Thompson (m. 1860; died 1880) Agnes C. Thompson (m. 1882)
- Children: 2 (including Robert)

Samuel Waters Allerton (1828-1914) was a businessman who amassed a substantial fortune, primarily through ventures in stockyards and livestock.

Allerton was the Republican Party's nominee for Chicago mayor in 1893, losing to Democratic nominee Carter Harrison Sr.

== Early life ==
Allerton was born May 26, 1828, in Amenia, New York, the youngest of nine children of Samuel Waters Allerton Sr., a tailor and woolen mill operator, and his wife, Hannah (née Hurd).

He was a descendant of Mayflower pilgrims Isaac Allerton and Elder William Brewster. Isaac Allerton married Brewster's daughter Fear, who became the mother of Samuel Allerton's ancestral line.

In 1835 when Allerton was seven, his father's woolen mill business failed financially, and the family property was auctioned off. This was reported to be a formative experience in Allerton's life. At the age of twelve, Allerton entered the workforce as a farm hand. The family experienced further financial difficulty as a result of the Panic of 1837 and some members moved as far west as Dubuque, Iowa, but ultimately they settled on a farm in Yates County, New York in 1842.

After six years Allerton had saved enough money to buy his parents a farm near Newark, New York, and they moved there.

== Adult life and career ==
With his oldest brother Henry, Allerton rented and purchased farms, netting profits from them, and became a small-time livestock trader. He increased his involvement in livestock and made money in a venture transporting livestock over land after a break occurred in the rail line between Erie, Pennsylvania and Dunkirk, New York.

Allerton then moved west, ending up in Fulton County, Illinois where he raised cattle for a year. He moved his livestock operations to Chicago in 1860, opening up Allerton Swine Yards at the terminus of the Hudson River Railroad.

On July 2, 1860 Allerton wed Pamilla Wigdon Thompson in Peoria, Illinois. She was the oldest daughter of wealthy cattle farmers Asler and Berintha Thompson who lived near Canton in Fulton County. The Allertons moved into the Orient House, a Chicago boardinghouse. They soon bought a house at 644 Michigan Avenue and lived there until 1879 when they moved to 1936 Prairie Avenue. The Prairie Avenue house had been built for Daniel M. Thompson in 1869, and the Allerton family owned it until it was demolished in 1915.

On June 10, 1863, their daughter Katharine ″Kate″ Reinette Allerton was born.

In 1863 Allerton was a co-founder of the First National Bank of Chicago. For many years, he served as the bank's director, and he continued to hold a financial interest his entire life.

In 1864, Allerton was a key partner in the founding of the Pittsburgh Joint Stock Yards and he was a leader in the push to consolidate Chicago's railroad stockyards into the Union Stock Yards in 1865. He led a group that invested $1 million to construct the St. Louis National Stockyards in 1871 and also invested in stockyards located in Baltimore, Jersey City, St. Joseph, Missouri, and Omaha.

On March 20, 1873, Allerton and his wife Pamilla had their second child, a son named Robert Allerton. A series of three oil paintings of the family by Henry H. Cross (1837−1918) in 1879 showed Samuel and Pamilla in a horse-drawn sleigh, Samuel and Robert in the sleigh, and Robert on his black pony.

Allerton was involved in the creation of the city's first cable car line.

Allerton was widowed on March 15, 1880, when Pamilla died of scarlet fever. On March 15, 1882, he married Pamilla's youngest sister, Agnes C. Thompson. Agnes was 24 at the time of their wedding, whilst Allerton was 53. While he and Agnes never had any children of their own, Agnes acted as a mother and mentor in the arts to Allerton's young son Robert, who was both her stepson and nephew.

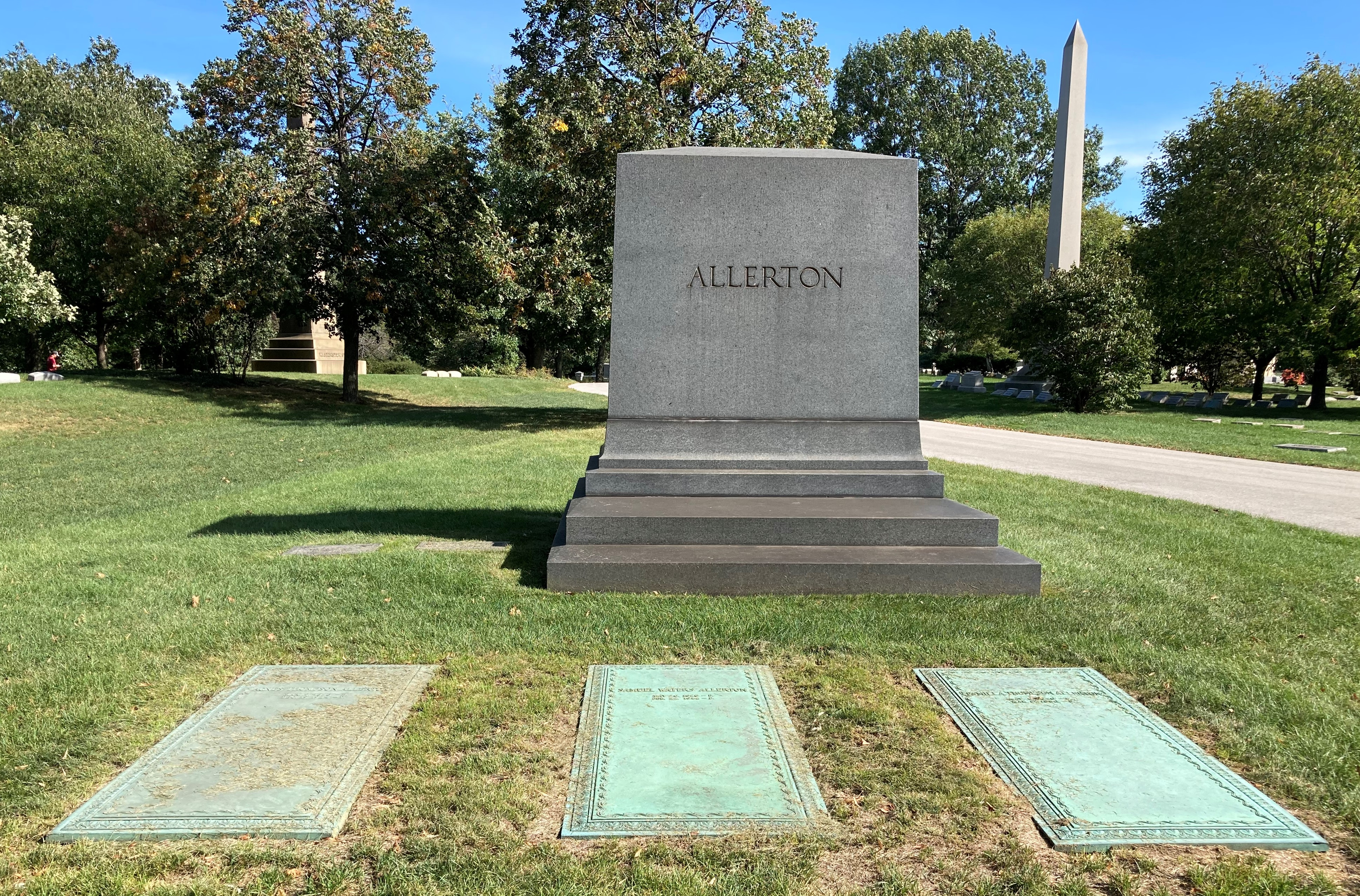
Allerton's grave at Graceland Cemetery

Politically, Allerton was a strong conservative Republican. In 1893 he was the Republican nominee for mayor of Chicago.

Allerton died on February 22, 1914, at the Allerton winter home in South Pasadena, California. Allerton's death was caused by diabetes from which he had long suffered. He is buried with his wives Pamilla and Agnes in Graceland Cemetery in Chicago.

== Wealth and property ==
By the turn of the twentieth century, Allerton was among Chicago's wealthiest men. At one point, he was ranked by the Chicago Tribune as the third-wealthiest man in Chicago, behind only Marshall Field and J. Ogden Armour. He was also a regular presence on Chicago's society pages.

Allerton owned a private Pullman railcar.

In addition to the residence on Chicago's prestigious Prairie Avenue the Allerton family maintained a summer home in Lake Geneva, Wisconsin called The Folly and a Mission style winter home in South Pasadena, California.

Allerton owned stockyards and farms throughout the Midwestern United States. He owned over 40,000 acres of farmland in Illinois, Iowa, and Ohio.

At one point, he was a well known breeder of horses for harness racing.

== Sources ==
- Bowman, David. ″Samuel W. Allerton (1828−1914)″ Proceedings of The Allerton Legacy Symposium. Robert Allerton Park, Monticello, Illinois May 22, 1981.
- Burgin, Martha and Maureen Holtz (2009) Robert Allerton, the Private Man and the Public Gifts. Champaign: The News−Gazette, Inc. ISBN 978-0-9798420-7-8
- Rotenstein, David S. "Hudson River Cowboys: The Origins of Modern Livestock Shipping". The Hudson Valley Regional Review. Poughkeepsie, New York. Volume 19, number 1.

Party political offices
Preceded by Hempstead Washburne	Republican nominee for Mayor of Chicago; 1893	Succeeded by George Bell Swift
