= Hempstead Washburne =

American politician

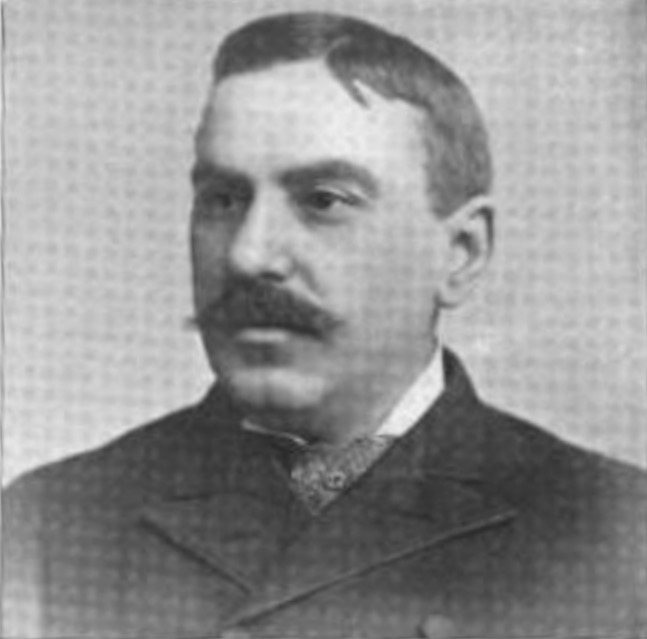

32nd Mayor of Chicago
- In office April 27, 1891 – April 17, 1893
- Preceded by: DeWitt Clinton Cregier
- Succeeded by: Carter Harrison Sr.

Personal details
- Born: November 11, 1851 Galena, Illinois, U.S.
- Died: April 13, 1918 (aged 66) Chicago, Illinois, U.S.
- Resting place: Graceland Cemetery, Chicago
- Party: Republican
- Spouse: Annie M. Clarke (m. 1883)
- Children: 4
- Parent: Elihu B. Washburne (father)
- Relatives: Israel Washburn IV (grandfather); Israel Washburn V (uncle); Cadwallader C. Washburn (uncle); Charles Ames Washburn (uncle); William D. Washburn (uncle); William Drew Washburn Jr. (cousin); Stanley Washburn (cousin)
- Education: University of Wisconsin Law School; Union College of Law
- Profession: Attorney
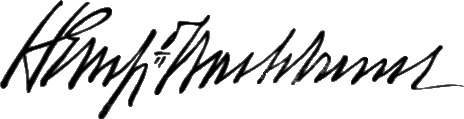
- Signature

Hempstead Washburne (November 11, 1851 – April 13, 1918) was an American attorney and Republican politician from Illinois. He served as the 32nd mayor of Chicago, from 1891 to 1893. He was a member of the Washburn family of Maine, and was the son of United States Secretary of State Elihu B. Washburne.

== Early life and career ==
Hempstead Washburne was born in Galena, Illinois on November 11, 1851, and attended Maine's Kents Hill School. He studied at the University of Bonn in Germany, and graduated from the University of Wisconsin Law School in 1874. In 1875, he completed supplemental legal education at Union College of Law (now Northwestern University Pritzker School of Law).

Washburne practiced law in Chicago. In 1880 he was appointed master in chancery for the Superior Court of Cook County. In 1885 he was elected Chicago city attorney. He was reelected in 1887, but declined to run again in 1889.

== Mayoralty ==
In 1891, Washburne was elected as mayor of Chicago, defeating Democratic incumbent DeWitt Cregier in a four-way race which also included former mayor Carter Harrison Sr. (running as an independent Democrat) and Washburne's own cousin once-removed Elmer Washburn. Washburne was sworn in as mayor on April 27, 1891. As mayor, he presided over development of the World's Columbian Exposition. He did not seek reelection 1893, and was succeeded as mayor by Democrat Carter Harrison Sr. on April 17, 1893.

Washburne's final act as mayor was to submit vetoes of two ordinances that the council had already passed, one which served the interests of the Midland Elevated Railway (which stockbroker James R. Keene held significant stake in) and another which would have granted the Hygeia Springs Company permission to supply water into the city. (which would have advanced controversial project by Wisconsin businessman James C. McElroy to pipe water from the famed springs in Waukesha, Wisconsin to the grounds of the world's fair). Similarly, Harrison immediately submitted his own vetoes of these ordinances immediately after delivering his inaugural address. All vetoes were sustained.

== Later life and career ==
After leaving the mayor's office, Washburne resumed practicing law, and became active in several business ventures. He also stayed active in government by serving on Chicago's civil service commission. He suffered a stroke and died in Chicago on April 13, 1918. He was buried at Graceland Cemetery.

== Family ==
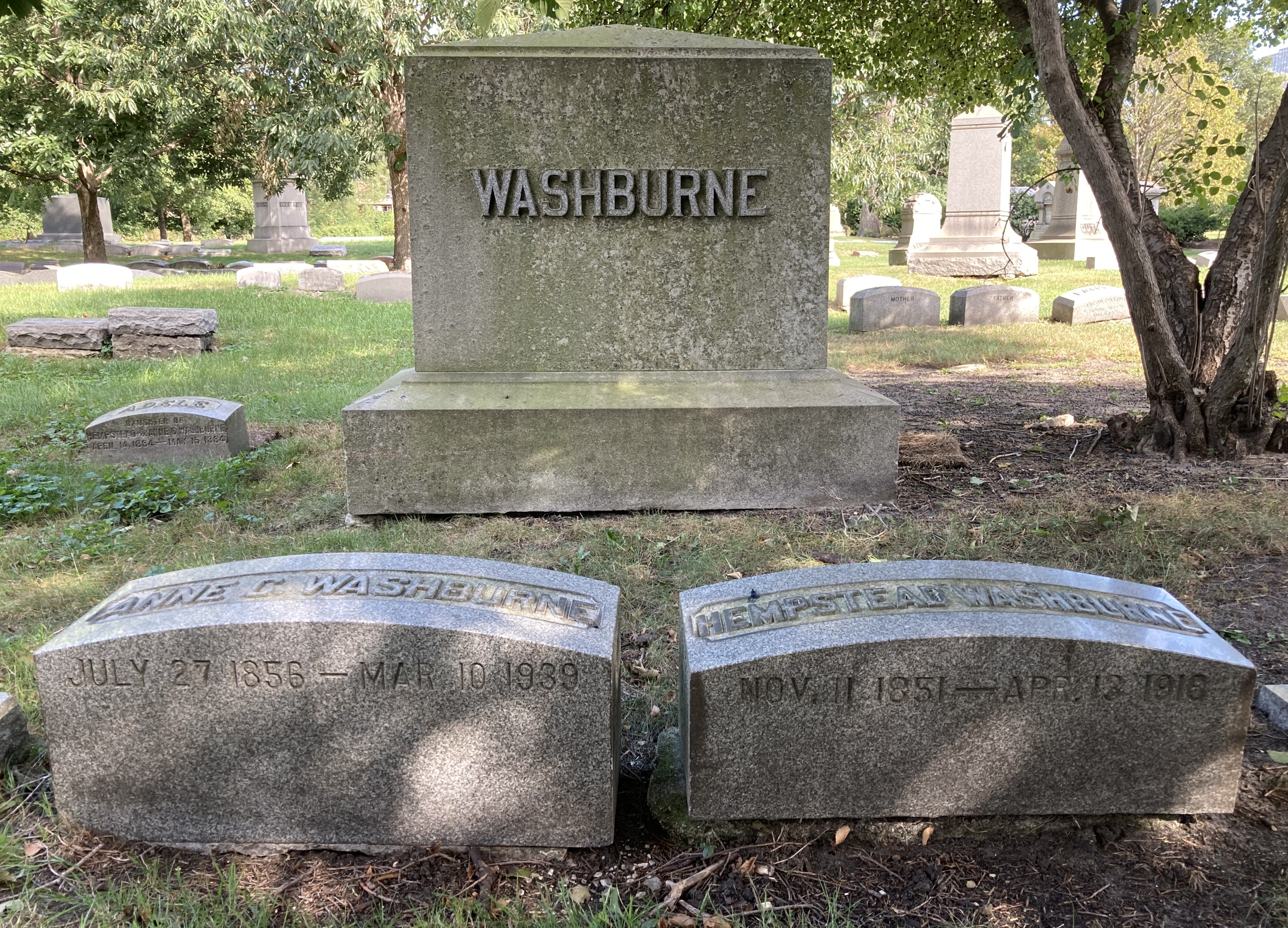
Graves of Anne and Hempstead Washburne at Graceland Cemetery

In 1883, Washburne married to Annie M. Clarke (1856-1939), a stage actress and the daughter of a prominent Chicago banker; they were the parents of four children.

Party political offices
Preceded by John A. Roche	Republican nominee for Mayor of Chicago; 1891	Succeeded by Samuel W. Allerton
