= 1889 Chicago mayoral election =

- April 2, 1889
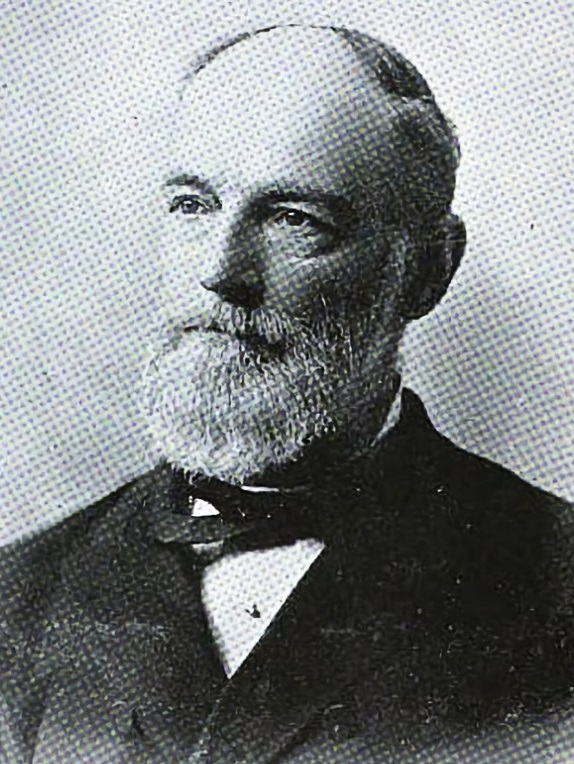

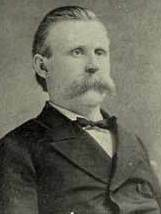
Nominee	DeWitt Clinton Cregier	John A. Roche
Party	Democratic	Republican
Popular vote	57,340	46,328
Percentage	54.93%	44.38%
Mayor before election
John A. Roche
Republican
Elected mayor
DeWitt Clinton Cregier
Democratic

In the Chicago mayoral election of 1889, Democrat DeWitt Clinton Cregier defeated incumbent Republican John A. Roche, winning a majority of the vote and a margin of victory in excess of ten percent.

The election was held on April 2, 1889.

== Campaign ==
Cregier was backed strongly by trade unions. John Peter Altgeld threw his backing behind Cregier's candidacy.

The election was the second of only two elections between 1879 and 1893 in which Carter Harrison III was not a candidate.

== Results ==
1889 Chicago mayoral election
Party	Candidate	Votes	%
Democratic	DeWitt Clinton Cregier	57,340	54.93
Republican	John A. Roche (incumbent)	46,328	44.38
Prohibition	Ira J. Mason	410	0.39
Socialist Labor	Charles Orchardson	303	0.29
Turnout		104,381	

Creiger received 76.86% of the Polish-American vote, while Roche received 23.07%.
