= Thomas J. Morgan =

American activist (1847–1912)

Tommy Morgan (1847–1912)

Thomas John "Tommy" Morgan, Jr. (October 27, 1847 – December 10, 1912) was an English-born American labor leader and socialist political activist. Morgan is best remembered as one of the pioneer English-speaking Socialists in the city of Chicago and a frequent candidate for public office of the Socialist Party of America. Morgan was also one of the founders and leading figures of the United Labor Party, an Illinois political party which elected 7 of its members to the Illinois State Assembly and another to the Illinois State Senate in the election of 1886. He was married to Elizabeth Chambers Morgan.

== Biography ==
=== Early years ===
Thomas John Morgan, known to his friends as "Tommy", was born in Birmingham, England on October 27, 1847. He was one of nine children born to Thomas John and Hannah Simcox Morgan. Thomas Senior, a former member of the Chartist movement, was a maker of nails, working long hours in an oftentimes futile effort to eke out a modest living.

As a boy Tommy Morgan attended a so-called "pauper's school" until the age of 9, at which time left school to take a job. Morgan worked as a nail maker, a printer, an iron molder, and a machinist, among other jobs, never managing to escape from poverty.

Morgan married the former Elizabeth Chambers in January 1868. The next year the pair decided to depart for a new life in the United States, settling in Chicago, Illinois.

=== American years ===
In America Morgan went to work for the Illinois Central Railroad. He remained for 20 years with this company, working in the railroad car repair shops. In this occupational context Morgan joined the International Machinists and Blacksmiths of North America in 1871, in which he served as the president of his local in 1874.

The economic depression of 1873 hit Morgan hard, resulting in 15 months of unemployment. This systemic economic failure made a particular impact upon Morgan, causing him to turn to the ideas of socialism in his effort to understand the crisis. Morgan joined the Social Democratic Workingmen's Party of North America in 1876 and continued membership in its successor organization, the Workingmen's Party of the United States, which had changed its name to the Socialist Labor Party of America before the decade was out.

In 1877 Morgan was instrumental in launching the Chicago Council of Trades and Labor Unions, a citywide union federation. In this capacity as a union official, Morgan guided a special committee of the Illinois State Legislature around various Chicago factories in 1879 and helped to draft city ordinances based on the English factory laws of the day. In that same year Morgan joined the Knights of Labor, a labor union making use of the structure and methods of a secret society.

Morgan made two runs for Chicago alderman, standing for election in 1879 and 1881.

Morgan ultimately left the Council of Trades and Labor Unions in 1884 to help form a more radical organization called the Chicago Central Labor Union.

=== After Haymarket ===
A large part of the Chicago organization turned to anarchism in subsequent years, culminating in the 1886 Haymarket bombing. Never an adherent of anarchist methods himself, the task fell upon Morgan and a handful of his co-thinkers to reestablish the Chicago socialist organization in the aftermath of the Haymarket Affair.

In August 1886, Morgan and others from the Chicago labor movement called a conference of area labor activists with a view to establishing a new electoral organization. About 250 delegates attended the conference, which elected Morgan to an executive committee of 21 members. This committee was charged with calling another convention in September to nominate a citywide slate of candidates for the fall elections under the banner of the United Labor Party.

Some 560 delegates, dominated by members of the Knights of Labor organization, attended the United Labor Party nominating convention in September. The meeting was not harmonious and following a spate of factional shenanigans a group of 26 conservative trade unionists were excluded from the gathering on the basis of their professed support for candidates of the Republican and Democratic Parties.

Although not himself a candidate, Morgan played a key role behind the scenes of the United Labor Party, chairing the important committee on platform and resolutions at the nominating convention, and helping to shape the final program of the organization.

The fledgling United Labor Party was surprisingly successful in the November 1886 elections, garnering about 25,000 out of 92,000 votes cast and electing 7 of its members to the Illinois Legislative Assembly and one other to the Illinois State Senate.

A similar nominating convention was held by the United Labor Party in February 1887, attended by more than 600 delegates. Morgan was once again the power behind the throne as head of the platform convention and chief among the movers and shakers of the organization, prompting the Chicago Tribune to opine that "Tommy Morgan...bossed the convention from first to last." The party's nominee for mayor of Chicago in the 1887 election was ultimately defeated by political fusion of the so-called "Old Parties" in which the Democrats (fielding no nominee of their own) largely supported the Republican nominee "to save city government from capture by the 'Reds.'"

Morgan was the Socialist Labor Party's nominee for Chicago mayor in 1891. That same year, he also helped to organize the International Association of Machinists, a successful union which survives into the 21st century. He served as the General Secretary of that organization in 1894 and 1895.

In 1893, while still occupied with union affairs, Morgan left work on the railroad to study law, ultimately graduating from Chicago Law College. He passed the exam of the Illinois State Bar in 1895.

Morgan was tapped as editor of the Socialist Alliance, official organ of the Socialist Trade and Labor Alliance, the trade union arm of the Socialist Labor Party, in 1896. He came to develop philosophical differences with SLP leaders over trade union policy, however, so he exited to join the Social Democratic Party of America in 1900. That year, he was the party's nominee for Cook County state's attorney. In the summer of 1901 that organization, headed by Eugene V. Debs and Victor L. Berger, merged with a rival political group to establish the Socialist Party of America (SPA). Morgan was a delegate to the founding convention of that organization in Indianapolis, Indiana.

Morgan was a frequent candidate of the SPA, running for Chicago city attorney in 1903, for Cook County Superior Court judge in 1903 and 1907, and for U.S. Senate in 1909. He also attended three of the party's conventions as an elected delegate: the Chicago conventions of 1904, 1908, and the so-called "Congress" of 1910.

Morgan turned to journalism in 1909, editing and publishing a Socialist newspaper called The Provoker until shortly before time of his death in 1912.

In 1910 Morgan was enlisted by veteran trade union activist "Mother" Mary Harris Jones to collect a 5-year old $250 debt from the Socialist Party's National Secretary, J. Mahlon Barnes. The tangled dispute over whether Barnes did or did not repay led to charges of dishonesty being preferred against Barnes before the Socialist Party, which were dismissed as "frivolous" by the governing National Executive Committee. Morgan and Jones persisted, however, and a special investigating committee was established to hear the charges. In February 1911 the committee affirmed that "the charge was indeed a most frivolous one, whose action could have no other motive except a desire to embarrass, harass, and annoy the National Secretary."

The investigating committee also weighed in on Morgan's newspaper, calling The Provoker, "a publication largely for the dissemination of malice, slander, falsification, and misinformation." The committee sought to turn the results of its inquiry over to Morgan's party branch for possible disciplinary action.

=== Death and legacy ===
While headed for retirement in California, Morgan was killed in a train wreck at Williams, Arizona on December 10, 1912. He was 65 years old at the time of his death.

Morgan's papers are held by the Illinois Historical Survey Library of University of Illinois in Urbana. Additional material, including 26 issues of Morgan's The Provoker, is held in the Special Collections department of the library at the University of Chicago.

== Works ==
- "Walter Thomas Mills: His Record," The Socialist [Seattle], whole no. 350 (Nov. 2, 1907), pg. 3.
- Who's Who and What's What in the Socialist Party. Chicago: Morgan, 1911.
