= Elizabeth Chambers Morgan =

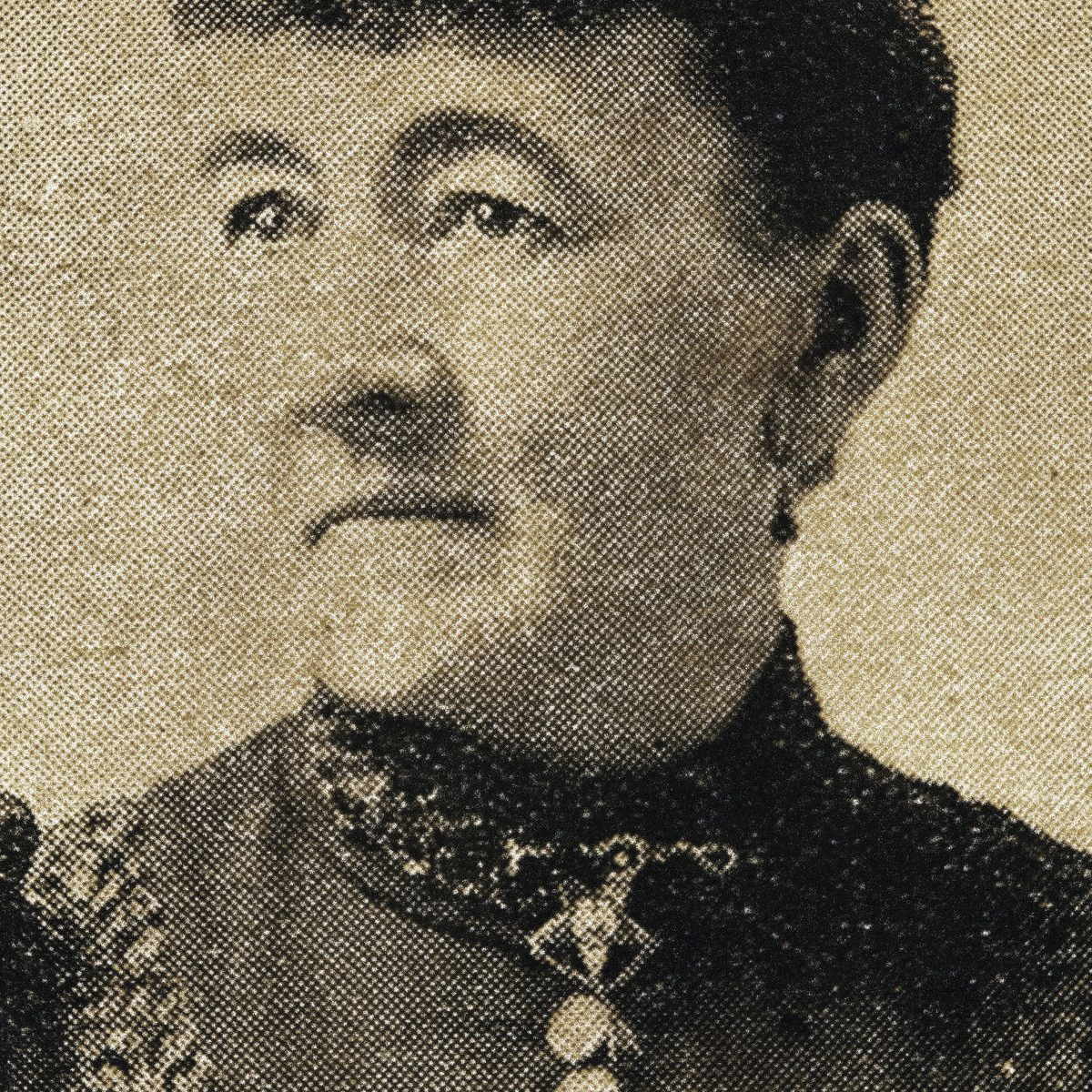
- Morgan in 1895
- Born: Elizabeth Chambers; June 16, 1850; Birmingham, England
- Died: February 11, 1944 (aged 93) near San Diego, California
- Citizenship: American
- Occupation: Labor organizer
- Known for: Reports on sweatshop practices in Chicago, labor laws protecting women and children
- Spouse: Thomas J. Morgan
- Children: 2

Elizabeth Chambers Morgan (June 16, 1850 – February 11, 1944) was an American labor organizer, social reformer, and socialist agitator based in Chicago, Illinois. She immigrated to the United States from England with her husband Thomas J. Morgan in 1869. She is known for exposing sweatshop conditions in Chicago. From 1888 to 1895 she was the leading woman in the Chicago labor movement.

== Early life ==
Morgan was born to Thomas and Sarah Chambers on June 16, 1850, in Birmingham, England. Her parents were factory workers. She had nine siblings and received little formal education. At age eleven she started working at a mill. She worked ten to sixteen hours per day. In January 1868 she married Thomas J. Morgan, a machinist. In 1869 the couple immigrated to the United States to seek better opportunities. They settled in Chicago where Thomas found work as a brass finisher and machinist, and she took care of their children, Thomas S. and Annie.

During the Panic of 1873, Thomas Morgan was out of work for fifteen weeks. The family experienced poverty and hunger. This motivated the Morgans to become labor activists and socialists. The couple had an egalitarian relationship which made it easier for Elizabeth Morgan to become a labor leader in her own right.

== Labor organizing ==
Morgan was a charter member of the Sovereigns of Industry from its establishment in 1874. She became a member of the Knights of Labor in 1881 and the master workman of local chapter 1789. She was the local 1789's delegate at the Chicago Trade and Labor Assembly, a trade union association. According to Ralph Scharnau, from 1888 to 1895 Morgan was the top woman in the Chicago labor movement. In June 1888 she led the effort to established the Ladies' Federal Labor Union No. 2703. She served as the secretary of the Union and was its delegate at the Chicago Trade and Labor Assembly. In four years the Ladies' Federal Labor Union started twenty-three new craft unions for women, all chartered by the American Federation of Labor (AFL).

In 1894 she was the only female delegate at the AFL convention and represented the Ladies' Federal Union No. 2703. At the convention she was nominated for the position of First Vice President, the first woman to run for a top AFL position. Although Morgan lost by a vote of 226 to 1865, the support she received showed that AFL members held her in high regard.

== Illinois Woman's Alliance ==
In 1888 the Chicago Times published several articles on the "horrendous conditions" of sweatshops and factories around the city. Morgan used the articles to gather and unite female socialists, settlement house workers, and trade unionists. Subsequently the coalition founded the Illinois Woman's Alliance. The stated mission of the Alliance was to "prevent the moral, mental, and physical degradation of women and children . . . employed as wage workers." The Alliance collaborated with other women's groups and fostered cross-class cooperation. Morgan's work brought her in contact with Florence Kelley and Mary Kenney O'Sullivan, as well as the Cook County Suffrage Association.

The Illinois Woman's Alliance determined that 50,000 children between age seven and fourteen worked in sweatshops or roamed the streets during the day. To combat this, the Alliance pushed the Chicago City Council and Chicago Board of Education to appoint additional truant officers, build more schools, and establish funds to help needy children attend school. The Alliance pushed for lowering school age from eight to six and increasing the mandatory number of school weeks from twelve to forty. On July 1, 1889, the Illinois General Assembly voted into law a Compulsory Education Act lowering school age to seven and extending the number of school weeks to sixteen. The Illinois Woman's Alliance continued to push for reform. Subsequently the Board of Education appointed additional truant officers, three female and one male. The Alliance was behind the Commissioner of Health's appointment of five female factory inspectors, as well as a successful campaign to build more schools. The Alliance sponsored a clothing drive for needy children and succeeded in getting an Alliance woman on the Chicago Board of Education.

== Social welfare activism ==
According to Ellen M. Ritter, up until 1891 Morgan had a confrontational style and used vituperation as a tool to push for social reform. She denounced government officials, state legislatures, mayors, major retailers, clergy and judges for failing to protect children, terrible working conditions, and the exclusion of women from school boards. The sweating system had become increasingly entrenched. Over time Morgan realized that denouncing public officials wasn't sufficient to bring about change.

=== Sweatshops ===
Morgan brought the grievances of Chicago cloakmakers to the attention of the Chicago Trade and Labor Assembly and advocated for reforming sweatshop practices. In response, the Assembly appointed Morgan and two others to investigate abusive practices and to report under a newly formed Committee on Abuses. Morgan led the efforts, and the newly formed committee published its findings in a report titled The New Slavery: Investigation Into the Sweating System on September 6, 1891. The report described the inhumane conditions in which women and children worked ten to fourteen-hour days. It described the crowded tenements and low wages of sweatshop workers. Morgan revised her confrontational style and used evidence and statistics to convince officials to take action. The Chicago Trade and Labor Assembly printed and distributed 10,000 copies of The New Slavery. The report was influential and on April 5, 1892, Morgan testified against sweatshop practices before a committee of the United States Congress. Morgan used the report, her testimonies, and her advocacy to convince legislators to improve labor laws, to persuade public officials to enforce existing laws, and to mobilize the middle-class to fight the sweating system.

In June 1893, the Factory and Workshop Inspection Act, also known as the Sweatshop Act, was passed by the Illinois General Assembly. This was a result of work done by Morgan and Florence Kelley, aided by progressive governor John Peter Altgeld. Section five of the Sweatshop Act restricted employers from working female employees more than eight hours per day, six days per week. Soon after, The Illinois Manufacturers Association was formed with the objective of challenging the Act, especially section five. The Association sponsored lawsuits and on March 15, 1895, in the case William E. Ritchie v. The People, the Illinois Supreme Court ruled that section five of the Act was unconstitutional.

=== Public institutions ===
Through her involvement with the Illinois Woman's Alliance, Morgan convinced the Chicago City Council to appropriate $25,000 for free public baths. As a committee member of the Chicago Trade and Labor Assembly, she investigated prison labor practices at a penitentiary in Joliet, Illinois. She inspected many public institutions, including the county poorhouse, asylum, and hospital. She also investigated harassment allegations and mistreatment of citizens by the Chicago area police.

== Post-activism ==
In the mid-1890s a rift developed in the Illinois Woman's Alliance between working-class and middle-class delegates. According to Ralph Scharnau, Morgan and the working-class delegates wanted to fix the system through additional paid inspectors, strikes, and political action; whereas the middle-class delegates wanted to rely on charitable works and found strikes "too confrontational". The combination of the Panic of 1893, the Pullman Strike of 1894, and the internal conflicts of the alliance caused the Illinois Woman's Alliance to fall apart. Morgan tried to form a new coalition to take the Alliance's place, but she could not unite the trade unionists and the socialists of Chicago's activist community.

Morgan began to study law when her husband started doing so at the Chicago College of Law in 1893. He opened a law office in the mid-1890s, and she worked at the office as bookkeeper, secretary and notary. For over fifteen years the Morgans used their law practice to protect workers and promote socialism. In early 1910s the couple decided to retire and move to California. On December 10, 1912, their San Diego-bound train crashed at Williams, Arizona, killing Thomas Morgan. Elizabeth Morgan, her daughter Annie, and Annie's children were not seriously injured.

Morgan settled outside San Diego, where she lived until her death on February 11, 1944.
