= 1891 Chicago mayoral election =

- April 7, 1891
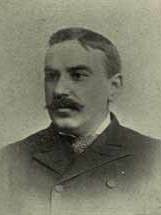

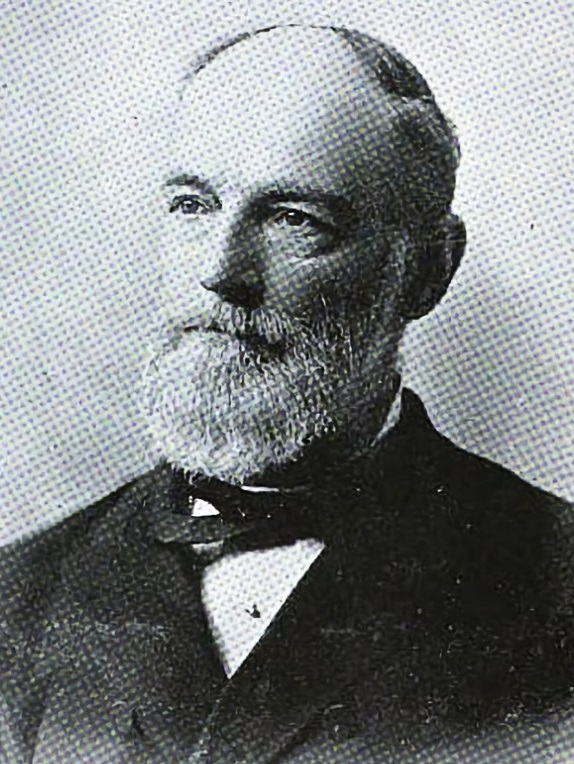

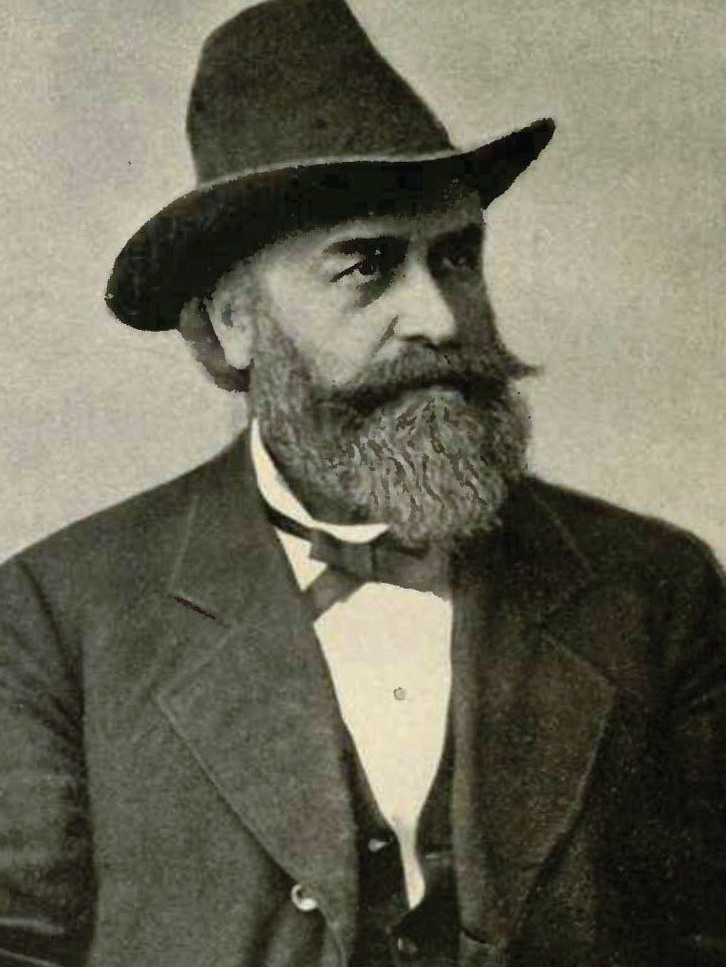

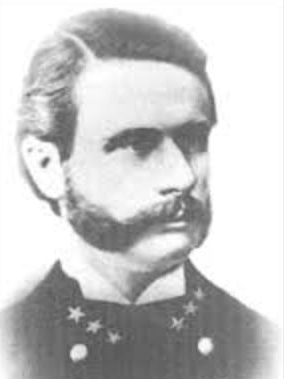
Nominee	Hempstead Washburne	DeWitt Clinton Cregier
Party	Republican	Democratic
Popular vote	46,957	46,558
Percentage	28.83%	28.59%
Nominee	Carter Harrison III	Elmer Washburn
Party	Independent Democrat	Citizens
Popular vote	42,931	24,027
Percentage	26.36%	14.75%
Mayor before election
DeWitt Clinton Cregier
Democratic
Elected mayor
Hempstead Washburne
Republican

The Chicago mayoral election of 1891 saw "Reform" candidate Hempstead Washburne narrowly win a four-way race against incumbent Democrat DeWitt Clinton Cregier, former mayor Carter Harrison III, and Citizens Party nominee Elmer Washburn. Also running was Socialist Labor candidate Thomas J. Morgan. Due to the four-way split in popular support, Washburne won with merely a 28.83% vote share; less than a quarter-of-a-percent margin of victory over second-place finisher Cregier and only 2.47% ahead of third-place finisher Harrison.

Before running in the general election as an independent Democrat, former mayor Harrison challenged Mayor Cregier for the Democratic Party's nomination. A primary was held to select the delegates to the city's Democratic Party convention. Cregier prevailed in getting more delegates supporting his renomination elected than delegates supporting Harrison for mayor. As a result, Cregier won the party's nomination at the convention.

The Citizens Party that nominated Elmer Washburn (former chief of the U.S. Secret Service, former head the Chicago Police Department, and former Supervisor of Lake Township) was backed by the city's old elite through the Union League Club of Chicago. Its goal was to reestablish the old elite's power in the city's politics

== Nominations ==
=== Democratic nomination ===
In 1891, incumbent Dewitt Clinton Cregier sought reelection.

Cregier's term as mayor had been regarded as decent. However, many Democrats were displeased with Cregier's favoritism of the city's Irish population over other groups. Additionally, followers of former mayor Carter Harrison III felt that Cregier had been disregarding them when making political appointments. A number of scandals had also tainted his administration.

Cregier was challenged by former mayor Harrison, who had sensed voter dissatisfaction with Cregier. Harrison also desired to oversee the city's hosting of the World's Columbian Exposition (which the city had hosted the right to host by the United States government in 1890, after a successful bid effort in which Cregier had been involved). Wishing to stage a political comeback, Harrison had come out of his retirement to run again for mayor. Both Cregier and Harrison were populist Democrats.

The race for the Democratic nomination was contentious and rancorous. Each candidate ran fierce campaigns. Harrison's campaign was managed by Adolf Kraus. The most influential backer of Harrison's candidacy was considered to be Frank Lawler. Lawler and Harrison each made speeches before large and excited crowds across the city in support of Harrison's candidacy. The local Democratic establishment (i.e. party leadership) largely stood in support of Cregier's candidacy, and the city's Democratic Executive Committee formally endorsed Cregeir's his candidacy. Cregier also received the backing of political organizations such as the Wah-na-ton Club and the Iroquois Club, as well as prominent Chicagoans such as John M. Palmer and Clarence Darrow.

The primary to elect delegates to the city nominating convention was held on March 20, and showed a clear victory for Cregier. However Harrison's supporters alleged that electoral fraud had taken place.

At the convention, an effort successfully prevented Harrison from being allowed to enter the convention hall. In protest of this, 47 of Harrison's 99 pledged delegates withdrew their places. In the end, Cregier was renominated at the convention by a vote of 331 to 52.

=== Republican nomination ===
The Republican Party nominated Hempstead Washburne.

=== Carter Harrison III's independent candidacy ===
While Cregier had managed to fend-off Harrison's challenge for the Democratic nomination, Harrison opted to challenge him in the general election as an independent.

=== Citizen's Party nomination ===
The Citizen's Party, which was operated through the Union League Club of Chicago and organized by notable businessmen such as Potter Palmer, Marshall Field, and Philip Danforth Armour, nominated Elmer Washburn.

The Citizen's Party and Washburn's candidacy was a well-funded attempt by the old elite of the city to retake control of local politics for the claimed purposes of bringing cleaner and more efficient governance and lower taxes.

Franklin MacVeagh, the original candidate sought by the (largely Republican) reformers behind the party, declined to run. It was after this that Washburn would enter the race.

=== Socialist Labor nomination ===
The Socialist Labor Party nominated Thomas J. Morgan.

== General election ==
In their platform Democrats, who nominated Cregier, supported an eight hour work day, affirmed that the streets were the property of the citizens, supported legislation for the masses, demanded that the city undertake its own construction work rather than relying on contractors, urged the enforcement of factory and tenement laws, urged a fixed salary to be paid to the city treasurer, and for the interest on deposits to belong to the city treasury.

The Democratic electorate was split between Cregier and Harrison. Union support was also split between the two candidates.

Harrison received the backing of congressman Frank Lawler.

Republican candidate Hempstead Washburne and Citizens candidate Elmer Washburn (former chief of the United States Secret Service and former Chicago Police chief) were both members of the Washburn family. Elmer Washburn was cousins with Hempstead Washburne's father Elihu B. Washburne.

In addition to being nominated by the Citizens committee, Elmer Washburn was also backed/nominated by the Prohibition Party. Elmer Washburn was criticized by some as "puritanical". Advancing a Sabbatarian agenda, the Citizens ticket he headed supported the closing of saloons, parks, and streetcar service on the Sabbath. His campaign was well-funded and well-publicized.

The race was intense, with all candidates engaging in vitriol, including slander. Harrison focused most of his attacks at Cregier. Cregier focused most of his attacks towards Harrison. Washburn focused his attacks on both Cregier and Harrison. Washburn divided his attacks among all three of the other main candidates.

Harrison's forces tried to paint Cregier as incompetent and as having unscrupulous connections. Creiger's forces, in turn, tried to claim that, through Frank Lawler, Harrison was connected to widely unpopular streetcar magnate Charles Yerkes.

The election was heated, resulting in physical confrontations. On one occasion during the campaign, Harrison literally had mud slung at him. On the day of the election and after the election results were counted, fights took place between supporters of rival candidates. This saw several serious injuries. James Scott, a black man who served as a ticket peddler for the Republican Party, was shot to death during a fight outside of a polling place.

=== Results ===
The election had a very close result, with Republican Hempstead Washburne prevailing. The coinciding Chicago City Council elections resulted in the Democrats having a majority on the City Council. The election marked only the second Republican mayoral victory in Chicago since 1877 (with the only other Republican victory having come in 1887, when the Democratic Party had run no nominee).

Despite the election being a victory for him, Cregier's 28.84% vote share was (at the time) the lowest any Republican nominee had received for mayor of Chicago (significantly worse than previous Republican low of 35.33% in 1879.

1891 Chicago mayoral election
Party	Candidate	Votes	%
Republican	Hempstead Washburne	46,957	28.84
Democratic	DeWitt Clinton Cregier (incumbent)	46,558	28.59
Independent Democrat	Carter Harrison III	42,931	26.36
Citizens	Elmer Washburn	24,027	14.75
Socialist Labor	Thomas J. Morgan	2,376	1.46
Turnout		162,849	

Creiger received 77.92% of the Polish-American vote, while Harrison received 10.42% and Washburne received 7.83%.

=== Allegations of irregularities misconduct ===
After the election, some factions of the Democratic party vocally issued allegations that there had been election irregularities and misconduct. It was alleged that strong-arm tactics being used by lieutenants of Creiger in seven wards.

== Aftermath ==
The divide between the Cregier's and Harrison's supporters would endure into the fall, when they held separate caucuses and sat separately at the Democratic Party convention. However, they ultimately united behind the party at this convention, supporting the Democratic ticket for the fall elections.

Complaints of election irregularities and misconduct strengthened the push for the adoption of a secret ballot in Chicago.
