= John A. Roche =

American politician

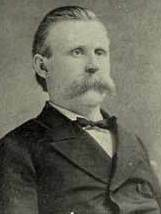

30th Mayor of Chicago
- In office April 18, 1887 – April 15, 1889
- Preceded by: Carter Harrison III
- Succeeded by: DeWitt Clinton Cregier

Member of the Illinois House of Representatives
- In office 1876–1878
- Constituency: Cook County

Personal details
- Born: August 12, 1844 Utica, New York, United States
- Died: February 10, 1904 (aged 59) Kenwood, Chicago, Illinois, United States
- Party: Republican
- Spouse: Emma H. Howard (m. 1871)

John A. Roche (August 12, 1844 – February 10, 1904) was an American politician from Illinois who served as Mayor of Chicago from 1887 to 1889. He was the 30th mayor of the city.

== Biography ==
=== Early years ===
John A. Roche was born in Utica, New York on August 12, 1844. He served as an apprentice to his brother for three years. He stayed in business for a long time, and had but a high school education. He was a firm believer in education and mentions this in his inaugural address.

=== Move to Chicago ===
In 1867, he moved to Chicago to do business. He married Emma H. Howard in 1871.

He represented Cook County in the Illinois House of Representatives for one term in 1876.

In 1887, he was the Republican nominee for mayor. He won against the Socialist candidate, Robert L. Nelson in a race that lacked a Democratic Party nominee. People admired him for his assertive and straightforward nature and history of business.

He was sworn in as mayor on April 18, 1887.

As a mayor, he was prominent for the drainage and water supply commission and being appointed to suppress gambling in saloons as well as closing disreputable ones.

In 1889, he lost his bid for reelection, being defeated by Democratic Party nominee DeWitt Clinton Cregier.

His tenure as mayor ended on April 15, 1889.

=== Retirement ===
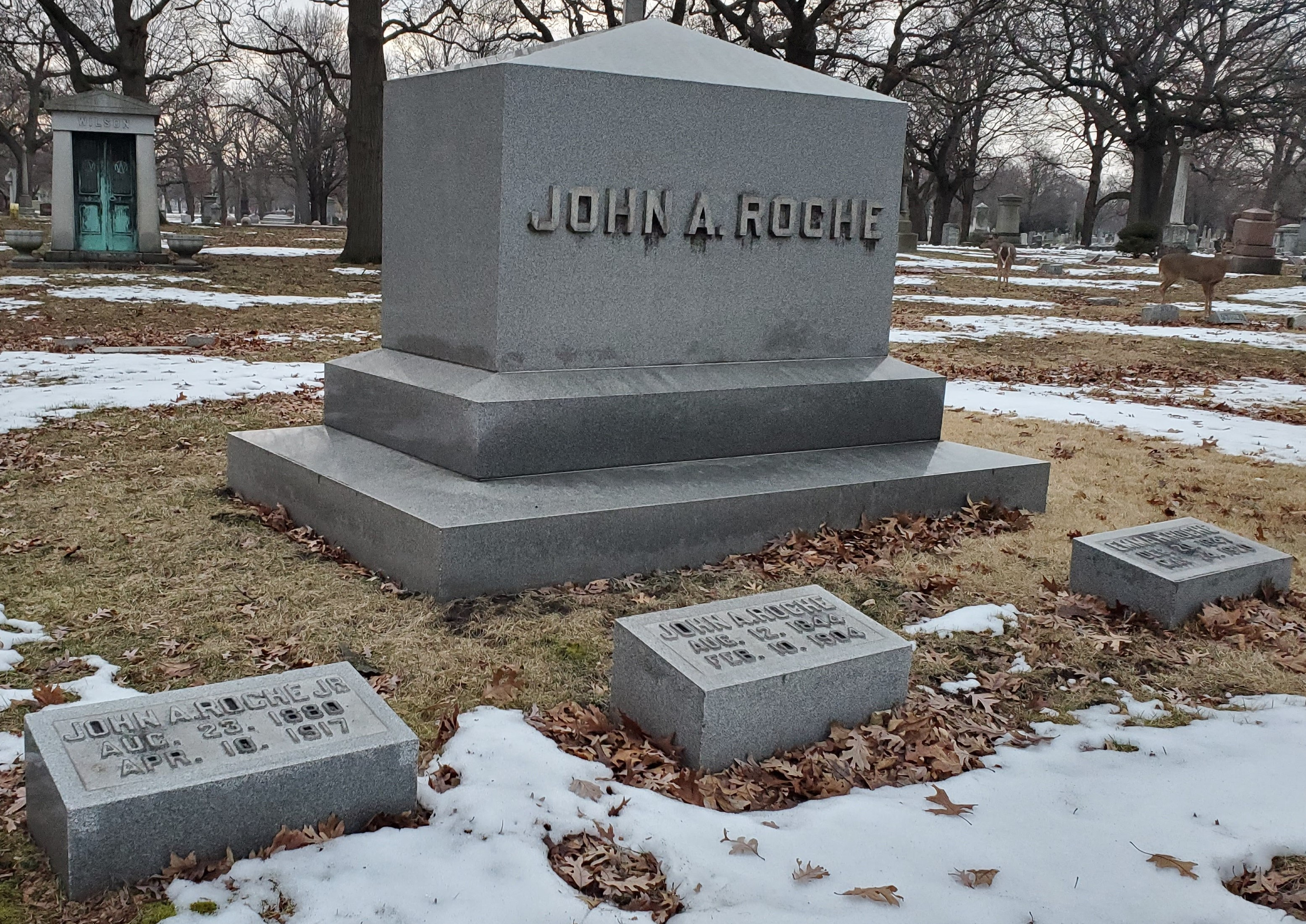
Roche's grave at Rosehill Cemetery

After retiring, he focused his attention once again on business, and became manager and vice president of the Crane Elevator Company. In 1893 he was elected president of the Lake Street Elevated Railroad Company. He then died on February 10, 1904, one hour after a meeting, from uremic poisoning. He was buried in Rosehill Cemetery in Chicago.

== Works ==
- "Mayor John A. Roche Inaugural Address, April 18, 1887", Chicago Public Library.

== Footnotes ==
Party political offices
| Preceded by Sidney Smith | Republican nominee for Mayor of Chicago; 1887, 1889 | Succeeded by Hempstead Washburne |
