= Robert Allerton =

American philanthropist (1873–1964)

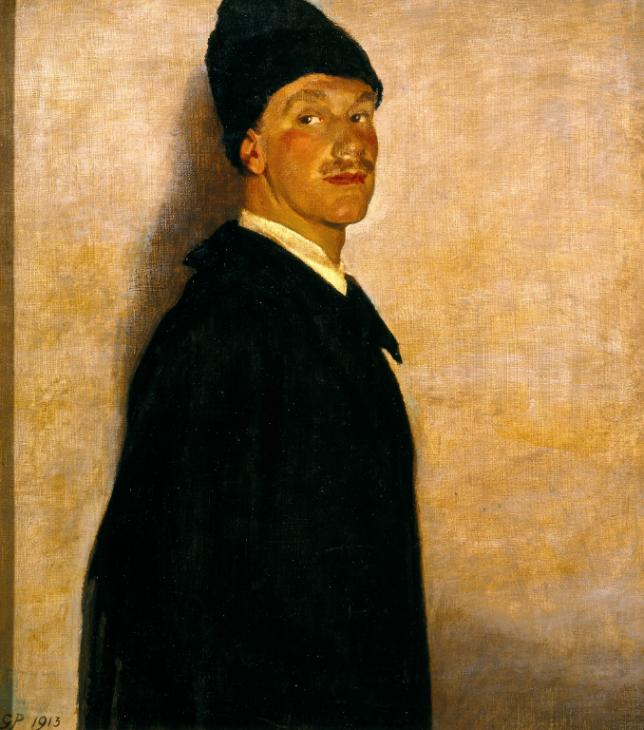
- The Man in Black (Robert Henry Allerton), 1913, by Glyn Philpot
- Born: March 20, 1873; Chicago, Illinois
- Died: December 22, 1964 (aged 91)
- Occupation: Philanthropist
- Known for: Donating thousands of artworks, trustee for Honolulu Academy of Art
- Parents: Samuel Waters Allerton (father); Pamilla Thompson Allerton (mother)

Robert Henry Allerton (March 20, 1873 – December 22, 1964), born in Chicago, Illinois, United States, was the son and heir of First National Bank of Chicago co-founder Samuel Allerton. He was a philanthropist who served as a trustee and honorary president for the Art Institute of Chicago, becoming one of its benefactors by donating thousands of artworks. He also became a trustee for the Honolulu Academy of Art, leaving a trust that funds the Academy to this day.

Robert Allerton traveled around the world buying statues and other works of art. Many were placed on his estate ″The Farms″ in Piatt County, Illinois. In 1946, Allerton donated the estate, which was renamed the Robert Allerton Park to the University of Illinois. More than 100 statues as well as many other artworks can be found there. He was instrumental in the founding of the National Tropical Botanical Garden, which now includes Allerton Garden, his former property on the island of Kauaʻi in the state of Hawaii.

== Early life ==
Robert Henry Allerton was born on March 20, 1873, as the second child and only son to Samuel Waters Allerton (1828–1914) and Pamilla Thompson Allerton (1840–1880). Through an entirely paternal line, Robert Henry Allerton was descended from Isaac Allerton, an English Puritan who came to America on the Mayflower in 1620. His father was a self-made man who made his millions in land, livestock, banking, and other commercial enterprises. Robert’s mother died in 1880, five days before his seventh birthday. Two years later, his father married Agnes Thompson, his mother’s younger sister. Agnes Thompson Allerton (1858–1924) became a mother, friend, and cultural mentor for her stepson/nephew. She kindled his interests in literature, music, gardening, and above all, visual arts.

The Allertons lived on Prairie Avenue in Chicago, which was the most fashionable residential street in that city in the late 1800s. The Allertons were neighbors of Marshall Field, the Pullmans, Kimballs, and Armours. Robert attended Allen Academy and Harvard School in Chicago, after which he and friend Frederic Clay Bartlett (1873−1953), were sent east to St. Paul's School, a prestigious college prep school in Concord, New Hampshire. The young Chicagoans decided not to go on to college, but rather to study art in Europe.

From 1894 to 1896 they studied at the Bayerische Akademie der Schönen Künste (Royal Bavarian Academy of Art) in Munich, Germany and the Académie Julian in Paris. After several years of study in Europe Allerton became dissatisfied with his abilities as an artist, burned his paintings and returned home to Illinois. Frederic Bartlett went on to become a professional artist.

In 1922 Allerton met John Gregg (1899–1986), an orphan and aspiring architect who worked for the society architect David Adler in Chicago during the 1920s. After the stock market crash of 1929 Adler′s work diminished and Gregg came to live at Allerton′s estate as landscape architect and business manager, a salaried position. Allerton and Gregg became lifelong companions. After a change in Illinois law in 1959, Allerton legally adopted Gregg as his son although Gregg didn′t adopt the Allerton surname until after Robert′s death in 1964. Following Robert Allerton′s death on December 22, 1964, according to his wishes John scattered his ashes on Lawai Bay, Kauai, Hawaii. When John died on May 1, 1986 his ashes were also scattered on the bay. It is believed that Allerton and Gregg were involved in a same-sex relationship. During their lifetimes, the United States practiced social and legal discrimination against homosexuals, and many homosexuals remained closeted (as it is believed Allerton and Gregg were). Same-sex adult adoption had been used a method of legally establishing relationships by homosexual couples prior the legalization of same-sex marriages and unions.

== "The Farms" ==
His estate began in 1897 when Allerton decided to become a farmer. By 1914 his "farm" had grown to over 12,000 acres (4,900 ha) and became known as "The Farms". Now called Robert Allerton Park, it is owned and operated by the University of Illinois near Monticello, Illinois. The botanical journal Allertonia and the two estate parks are named after Robert Allerton. The main building of the Art Institute of Chicago, where he served as the honorary president and trustee, was renamed the Allerton Building in his honor in 1968.

== Hawaiʻi ==
The former Hawaiian Royal tropical estate, located on the island of Kauaʻi in Hawaiʻi, is now called the Allerton Garden. After John Gregg Allerton's death it became part of the National Tropical Botanical Garden, with public tours.

== See also ==
- Robert Allerton Park ("The Farms," Illinois)
- Allerton Garden (Kaua'i, Hawaii)
