= DeWitt Clinton Cregier =

American politician

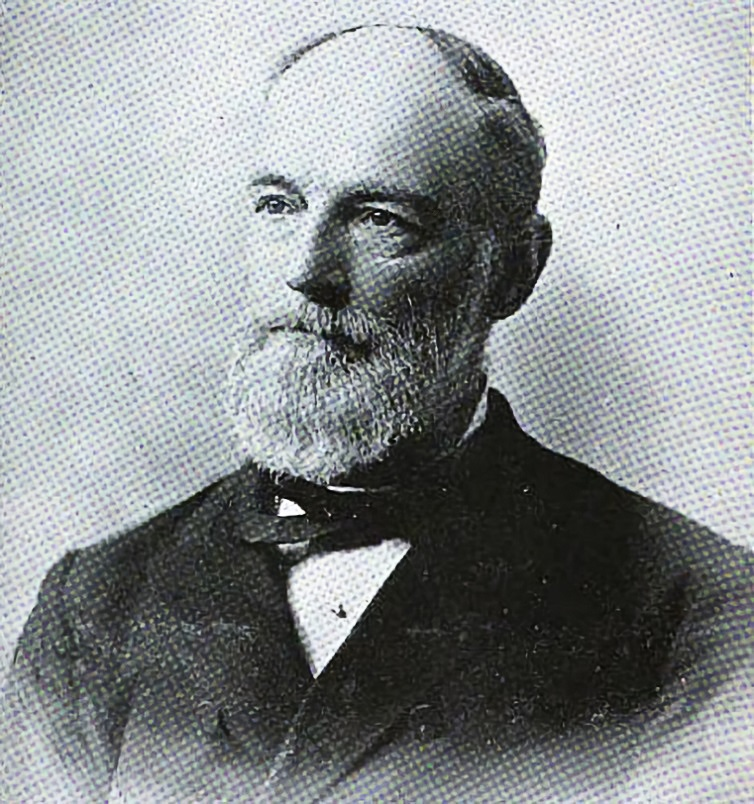

31st Mayor of Chicago
- In office April 15, 1889 – April 27, 1891
- Preceded by: John A. Roche
- Succeeded by: Hempstead Washburne

Personal details
- Born: June 1, 1829 New York City
- Died: November 9, 1898 (aged 69) Chicago, Illinois, United States
- Resting place: Rosehill Cemetery
- Party: Democrat
- Height: 5 ft 7 in (170 cm)
- Spouse: Mary Sophia Foggin
- Children: Ten (2 daughters, 8 sons)
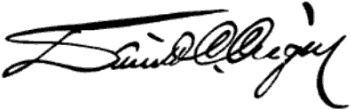
- Signature

DeWitt Clinton Cregier (June 1, 1829 - November 9, 1898) was an American engineer and politician. He served as Mayor of Chicago, Illinois (1889–1891) for the Democratic Party.

== Early career ==
Cregier worked as an engineer with the City of Chicago, and was awarded, in 1875, U.S. patent 164,149 and in 1876, U.S. patent 173,768, both for fire hydrants. The latter was a combination drinking fountain, fire hydrant, and watering basin for animals. The Cregier hydrant is widely seen in old photographs of Chicago.

Cregier was also Master Mason, presided as Worshipful Master of Blaney Lodge No. 271, A.F. & A.M. of Illinois for eight years, and served as Grand Master of Illinois in 1870–1871. D.C. Cregier Lodge No. 81 in Wheeling, Illinois, is named after him. He was a fifth great-grandson of Martin Cregier, first Burgomaster of New Amsterdam.

Cregier served as the chief engineer of the Chicago water system, and subsequently as Chicago's Commissioner of Public Works during the first mayoralty of Carter Harrison Sr. Cregier came into conflict with Harrison when Cregier's own ambition to someday become mayor became apparent.

== Political career ==
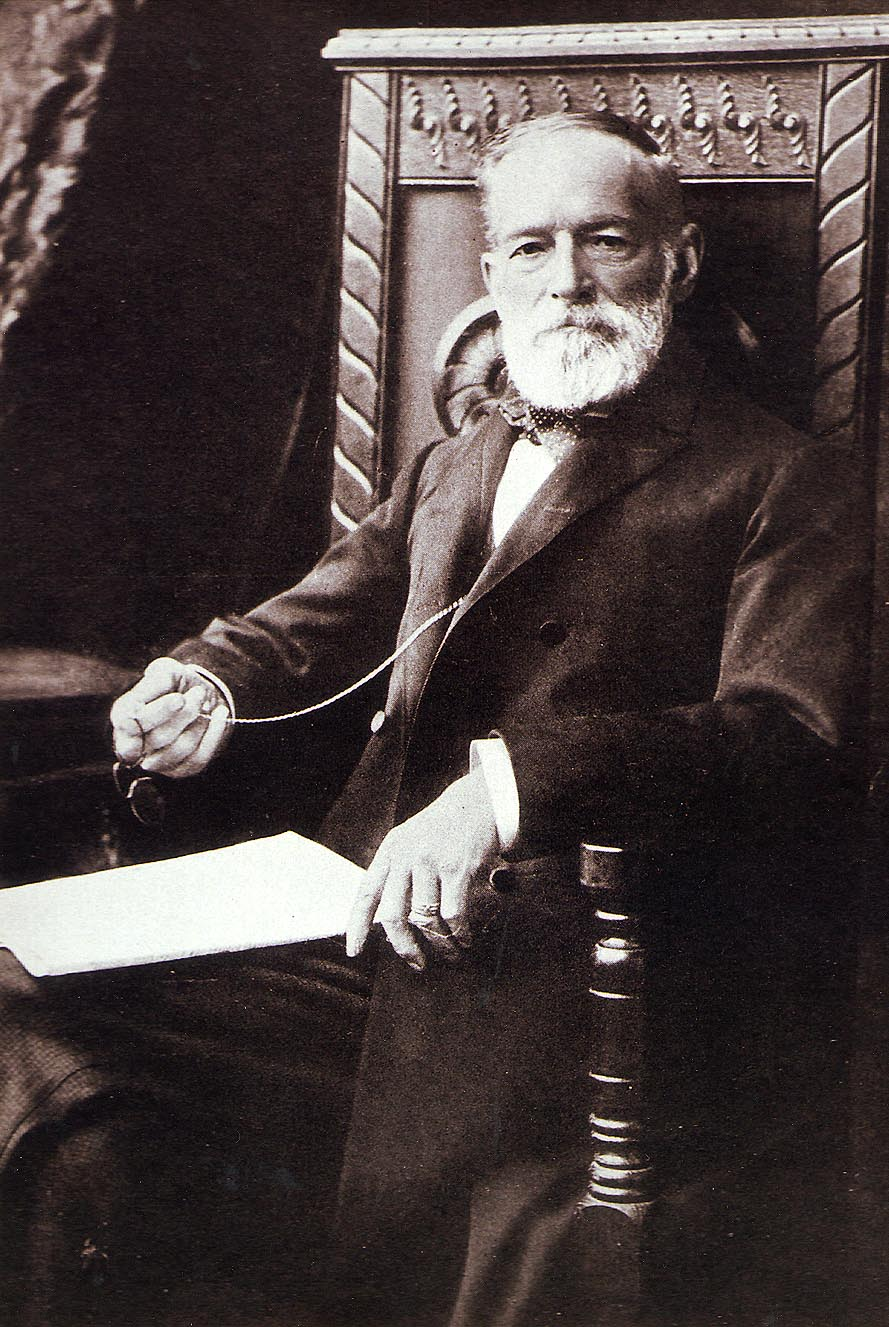
DeWitt Cregier as mayor of Chicago

In the 1887 Chicago mayoral election, the city's Democratic Party tried nominating him, but he declined their nomination. Ultimately, no Democrat would run in the election.

Cregier won the 1889 Chicago mayoral election as the Democratic Party nominee, defeating incumbent Republican mayor John A. Roche. Cregier was sworn in as mayor on April 15, 1889.

As mayor, Cregier, alongside former Illinois Central Railroad president Edward Turner Jeffery and businessman Thomas Barbour Bryan, delivered the presentation for Chicago's successful bid to the fifteen member United States Senate committee that decided what location would be awarded the World's Columbian Exposition.

Cregier lost his bid for reelection in the 1891 Chicago mayoral election. He had first seen Carter Harrison Sr. challenge him for the Democratic nomination. Cregier was able to win renomination over Harrison, as the local Democratic political machines had supported Cregier as they found him to be even more accommodating to them than Harrison had been. However, he lost the election in a four-way race, featuring Carter Harrison Sr. as an independent Democrat, Hempstead Washburne as the Republican nominee, and Elmer Washburn as the "Citizens" nominee. Cregier placed second, losing to Republican nominee Hempstead Washburne.

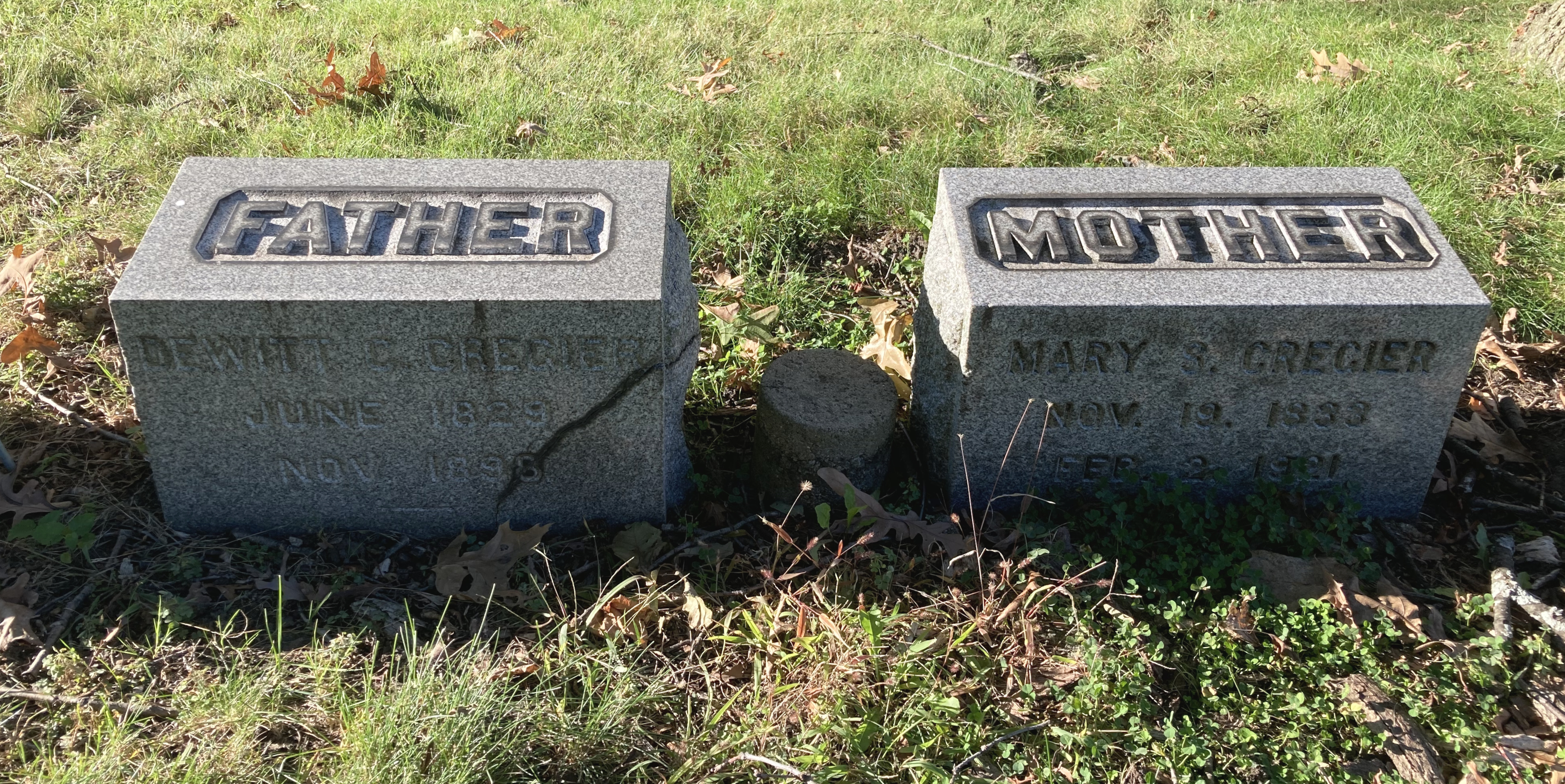
Graves of DeWitt Clinton and Mary Sophia Cregier at Rosehill Cemetery

Cregier's tenure as mayor ended on April 27, 1891.

In the 1893 Chicago mayoral election, Cregier ran as the nominee of the new "Citizens Party", but received little support.

He died at his home in Chicago on November 9, 1898, and was buried at Rosehill Cemetery.

== Legacy ==
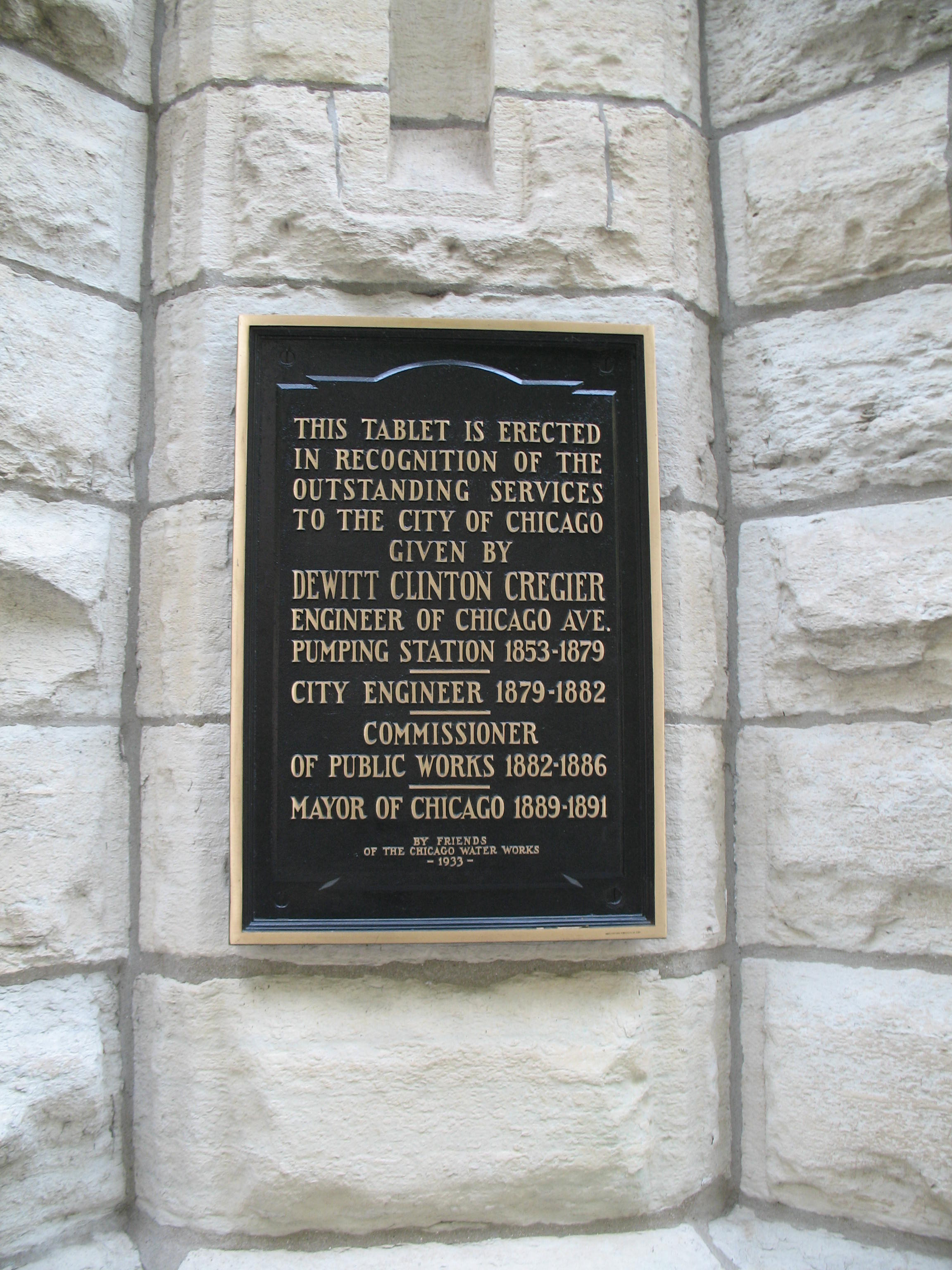
Plaque on west facade of the Chicago Water Tower, mounted in 1933 in honor of Cregier's services

In October 2011, a biography of Cregier entitled: The New York Orphan Who Built Chicago subtitled: The Story of DeWitt Clinton Cregier A 19th-Century American Engineering Genius was published, written Gloria Cregier Emma, one of Cregier's last surviving two grandchildren.
