= Lake Township, Cook County, Illinois =

Former township in Cook County, Illinois

Lake Township
- Former Township
- Interactive map of Lake Township
- Coordinates: 41°46′3″N 87°40′47″W
- Country: United States
- State: Illinois
- County: Cook
- Annexed: 1889

Lake Township, also known as the Town of Lake, was a 42-square-mile (109 km^{2}) former civil township in Cook County, Illinois, which now forms the south-west portion of Chicago. It was bounded by present-day Pershing Road (3900 South) on the north, State Street (0 East/West) on the east, 87th Street (8700 South) on the south, and Crawford Avenue (4000 West) on the west (although some sources state the current Chicago City boundaries as former south and west boundaries). The Union Stock Yards were developed as an economic anchor of the township.

The township was annexed into the city of Chicago in 1889, and its functions fell into abeyance. Townships in Chicago were abolished in 1902; however, they, including Lake Township, are still used for property assessment purposes. The former township hub became the Englewood neighborhood.
