= 1893 Chicago mayoral election =

- April 4, 1893
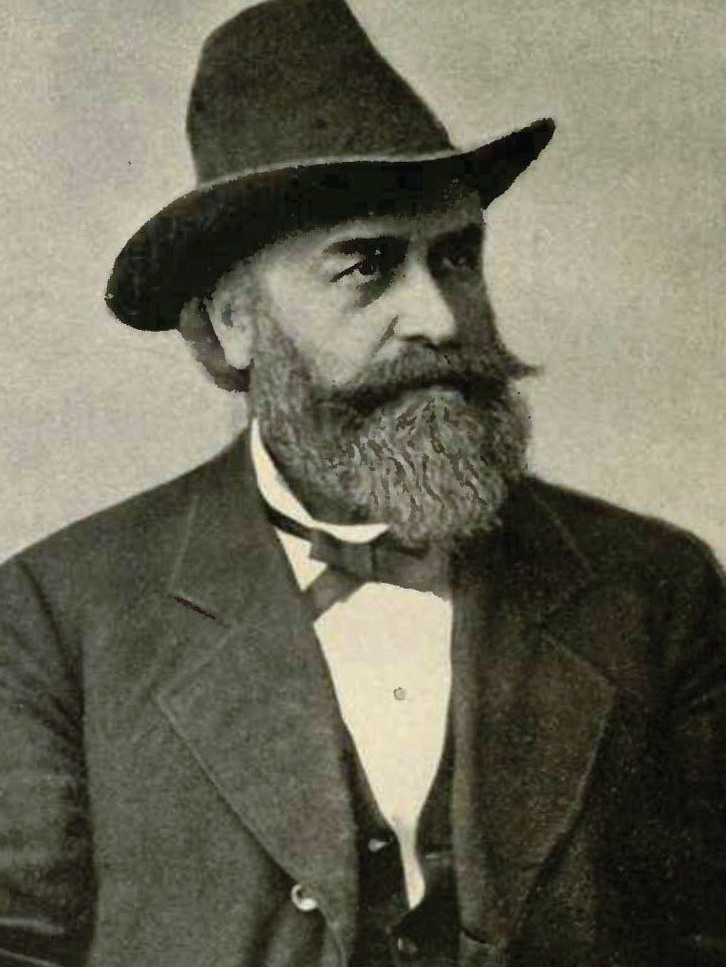

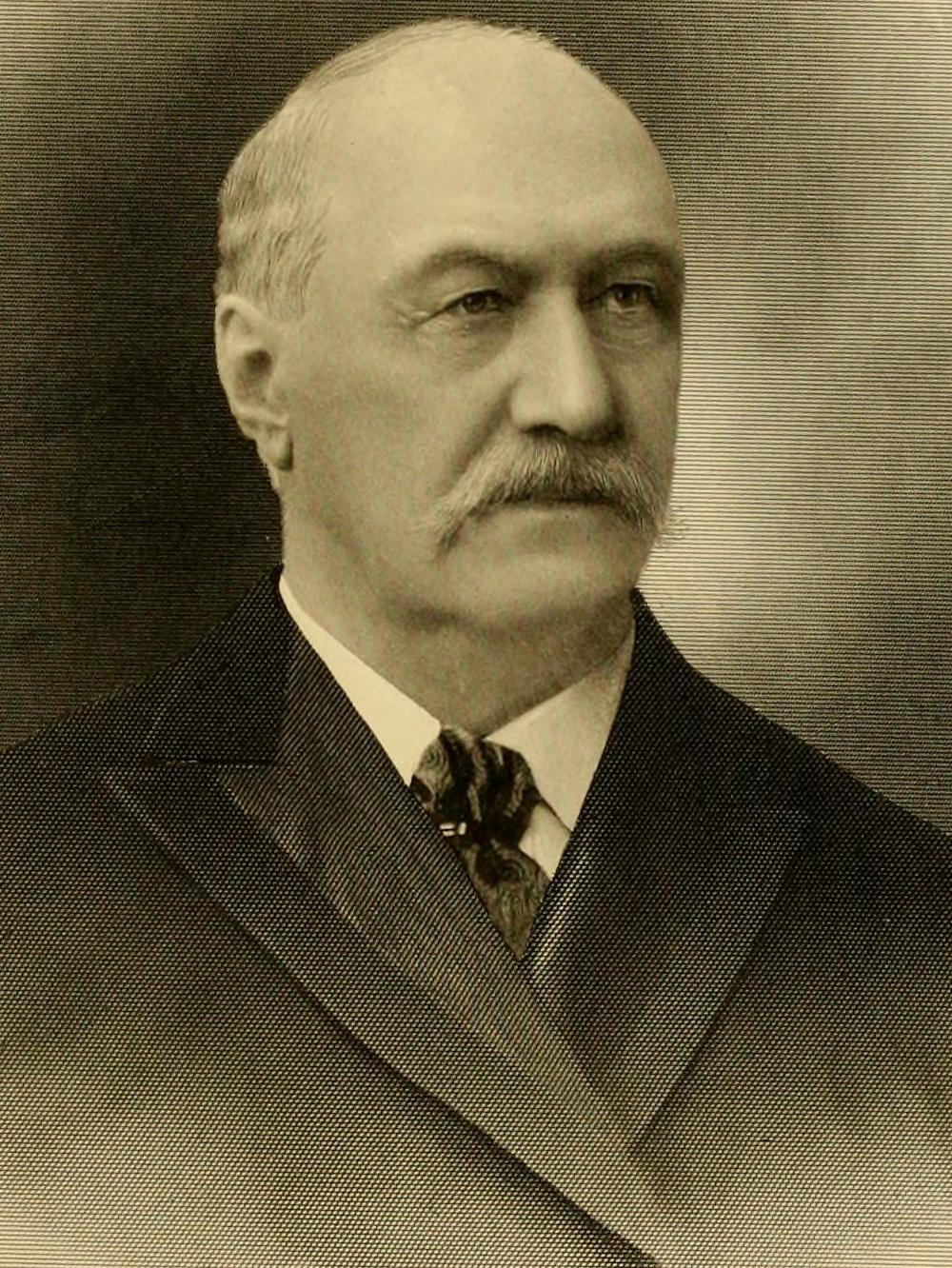
| Nominee | Carter Harrison III | Samuel W. Allerton |
| Party | Democratic | Republican |
| Popular vote | 114,237 | 93,148 |
| Percentage | 54.03% | 44.06% |
Mayor before election
Hempstead Washburne
Republican
Elected mayor
Carter Harrison III
Democratic

In the Chicago mayoral election of 1893, Democrat Carter Harrison III won election, returning him the mayor's office for a (then-record) fifth non-consecutive term as mayor of Chicago. Harrison won a majority of the vote, defeating the Republican nominee, businessman Samuel W. Allerton, by a ten-point margin. He also defeated two third-party candidates: United Citizens nominee DeWitt Clinton Cregier (a previous Democrat mayor) and Socialist Labor Party nominee Henry Ehrenpreis, neither of whom received strong support.

Ahead of the general election, Harrison had faced opposition in his race to receive the Democratic Party's nomination. Both former mayor Cregier and Illinois Staats-Zeitung newspaper editor and former Cook County deputy sheriff Washington Hesing also sought the Democratic nomination at the party's convention.

== Background ==
The election took place against the backdrop of the city's preparations for the World's Columbian Exposition, to be held later that year.

Carter Harrison III had previously served as Mayor of Chicago for four terms, from 1879 through 1887. In 1891, Harrison came out of political retirement and ran unsuccessfully as a third-party candidate for mayor of Chicago, after having first unsuccessfully challenged then-incumbent DeWitt Clinton Cregier for the Democratic nomination.

In the time since the 1891 election, Harrison had made peace again with the Democratic Party, supporting its 1892 presidential nominee Grover Cleveland. However, Harrison never had a particularly strong relation with Cleveland, and by the time of the 1893 election, the two had drawn a rift over Harrison's disagreement with Cleveland's stance on the silver issue. In addition, Harrison had a longstanding feud with Michael C. McDonald, then an influential figure in Chicago Democratic politics.

Cleveland's 35,000 vote plurality in the city in November 1892 indicated to Harrison the possibility for a strong Democratic performance in the 1893 mayoral election, influencing him to run.

Harrison had made a number of moves that would assist him in his 1893 mayoral campaign. First, he purchased the Chicago Times, which he used to promote his political agenda and would also use to support his political ambitions. He also founded the Carter H. Harrison Democratic Association. This organization was presented as an endeavor to encourage good governance, but it was instead the start of a political organization that would become a formal faction of the city's Democratic Party, rivaling the more informal organization headed by Roger Charles Sullivan and John Patrick Hopkins.

== Democratic nomination ==
=== Campaigning ===
Ahead of its nominating convention, Democratic Party faced one of the most contentious races for its mayoral nomination in the history of the city. There was great interest since the mayor elected in 1893 would be poised to represent the city to visiting dignitaries at the world's fair. Three individuals suggested themselves to Democrats as potential contenders: former mayor DeWitt Clinton Cregier, and Washington Hesing.

By early 1893, Carter Harrison III's campaign was full-fledged. His campaign manager was Adolf Kraus, who had also managed Harrison's 1891 campaign. The Harrison campaign made an effort to ignite ward level excitement for Harrison by utilizing local branches of the Harrison Democratic Association. Harrison indicated that he intended to run in the general election, regardless of whether he received the party's nomination; and that he was confident that he could win the general election with or without it. He entered the race without having the support of significant organized groups or newspapers (other than the Chicago Times, which he owned). Nevertheless, his campaign quickly gained momentum. This troubled many establishment Democrats, such as Roger Charles Sullivan and John Patrick Hopkins, who were concerned that the charismatic Harrison would come to dominate the party if he was successful at winning the mayoralty.

Since Grover Cleveland (the then-president-elect of the United States) and Harrison had fallen-out over the issue of silver –and since John Patrick Hopkins was considered to be the leader of the Cleveland wing of the local Democratic Party, Hopkins took charge in seeking to block Harrison's pursuit of the mayoralty. Hopkins and his political partner Roger Charles Sullivan looked at several prospective candidates to challenge Harrison for the nomination. Dewitt Clinton Cregier had been talking about potentially running again, but he was not seen as likely to win. Ultimately, Hopkins settled on Illinois Staats-Zeitung editor and former Cook County deputy sheriff Washington Hesing. Hopkins served as Hesing's campaign manager, while Sullivan helped Hesing organize at the ward level. Hesing was also backed by Michael C. McDonald and John Coughlin.

Despite efforts to stop Harrison, he continued to pick up momentum. He had garnered the backing of many of the city's influential Democratic figures, including John Powers and James H. Farrell. He received support from a vast array of ward clubs and sub-factions of the city's Democratic electorate.

Hesing accused Harrison of being supported by "corrupt use of money", accusing him of accepting $30,000 from the railroads in return for pledging not to enforce then-pending City Council ordinances that would require the railroads to undertake the expensive step of elevating their tracks to eliminate level crossings. However, Hesing's candidacy suffered from the fact that many voters, including nativists and including many Irish American voters, held resentments against Germans, viewing them as anarchists and socialists and associating them negatively with incumbent governor Atgeld. While Hesing ran a tough campaign, Harrison took a strong lead.

=== Election of Democratic delegates ===
The primary to elect delegates to the city nominating convention was held on February 27. In the primary, Harrison won a strong victory, winning at least three-quarters of the delegates. Hesing lodged accusations of voter fraud against Harrisonites. Harrison had used many means to get loyal delegates elected, and entered the convention with roughly 500 of the convention's 600 delegates. Hessings allies had considered challenging these results during the convention, but abandoned this in recognition that Harrison would be able to exercise control over the convention vote on such a challenge.

=== Democratic convention ===
At the convention, held March 1 at the Central Music Hall, three candidates had their names put forth for the nomination: Harrison, Hesing, and Cregier. The convention was one of the largest city local party conventions in Cook County, Illinois history. The John Powers-led wing of the party had packed the convention with loud Harrison supporters, and the convention had seen fistfights break out across the room. The Chicago Tribune had dubbed it the, "most disorderly and riotous" convention in the city's history. Hesing, who was heckled during his address, stormed out of the hall. Harrison won the nomination on the first ballot, receiving 531 delegate votes to Cregier's 93 and Hesing's 57.

1893 Democratic city convention mayoral nominating convention balloting (simple-majority needed for nomination)
| Candidate | Formal ballot votes |
|---|---|
| Carter Harrison | 531 |
| DeWitt Clinton Cregier | 93 |
| Washington Hesing | 57 |
| Total | 681 |

== Republican nomination ==
The Republicans had sought to recruit a highly prominent capitalist figure of the city to face Harrison in the general election, but had failed in their attempts to persuade Philip Danforth Armour or Lyman J. Gage to run. The party nominated ultimately nominated Samuel W. Allerton.

== United Citizens nomination ==
The United Citizens party nominated former mayor DeWitt Clinton Cregier. United Citizens was a party that had been founded by Chicago Daily News publisher Victor Lawson. Cregier, who still harbored resentment over the 1891 campaign, ran in hopes of preventing a Harrison victory.

While he ultimately received just over 3,000 votes, there was some belief that he would be a much larger factor in the election result. A prediction was made by Chicago reporters of The New York Times shortly before the election that, while Harrison would likely win, "Cregier will [likely] poll 10,000 or 20,000 votes; enough to be a disturbing element, but not to [win]."

== Socialist Labor Party nomination ==
The Socialist Labor Party nominated Henry Ehrenpreis.

== General election ==
=== Campaign ===
The race was considered to have been one of the most rancorous in Chicago's history. Willis J. Abbot wrote that, "the bitterness and acrimony of the campaign exceeded anything ever known in Chicago politics." There was such great interest in the election, and 20,000 voters newly registered in advance of election.

Harrison was regarded to be an underdog in the race. The city elite largely considered Harrison to be too liberal and believed that he allowed himself to be surrounded by corrupt associates. Thus, Allerton, a conservative Republican, received broad backing from the city elite and nearly all of the city's newspapers. The sole paper to back Harrison was the Chicago Times, which Harrison was the owner of.

Michael C. McDonald attempted to reconcile with Harrison, offering Harrison his support. Harrison rejected his offer. Despite this, rumors persisted that Harrison had received McDonald's support in exchange for agreeing that, as mayor, he would provide McDonald a license to operate the Garfield Park racetrack.

Harrison reportedly spent $500,000 in his campaign effort. He benefited from a well-run campaign operation.

Many voters believed that the charismatic Harrison was the best choice to be the "face" of the city during the World's Fair, thinking that he was the best option to serve as the city's ambassador to the world during the course of the exposition. Others, however, believed that Harrison's leadership style was better adapted to the past, when Chicago was a burgeoning metropolis. They believed that hosting the World's Fair indicated that the city had reached a stage of maturity in its development and that Harrison was ill-suited to lead the city at such a stage.

Allerton was seen as a reluctant candidate. He was seen as lacking in moxie as a candidate. He campaigned by portraying himself as a businessman rather than a politician, promising that he would run Chicago like a business. He pledged to bring clean government and clean streets. He also stated that only professional and business leaders of the "highest standing" would be appointed to office. Allerton argued that the administration of the upcoming World's Fair presented a model for the business-style governance Chicago should adopt. His platform advocated civil service reform, improved city services, and lower taxes. However, much of his platform was indistinguishable the urban reform which Harrison had backed during his mayoral tenure.Additionally, Allerton's campaign was more focused on attacking Harrison than it was on extolling the virtues of Allerton's own platform.

Allerton received backing from the elites that were organizing the World's Fair. This included the support city business elite such as Philip Danforth Armour, Lyman J. Gage, Harry Gordon Selfridge, Charles L. Hutchison, Franklin MacVeigh, Harlow Higinbotham, and Turlington Harvey. Deriding Harrison's backers as representing "all the immorality of the city", and contrasting that with his own backing from leading figures of the city, Allerton framed the race as a choice between "the slums" and the men who built modern Chicago.

Harrison, who pledged that he would run an honest campaign against Allerton, was the target of slander from opponents throughout the campaign. Republicans placed blame for all of the city's ills on Harrison. Some Christian evangelists even tied blame for the Haymarket affair bombing with Harrison's support for allowing saloons to remain open on Sundays. Both Allerton and Cregier made an effort to paint Harrison as corrupt.

Harrison effectively responded to criticisms about his previous record as mayor by stating that he had done the best he could when he was mayor to work around state-imposed limitations on the city's taxation powers. He campaigned on a platform which included plans to reform the city's tax assessment system.

Republicans advocated for an unrealistic combination of lower taxes and expanded municipal services, unconvincingly telling voters that needed money could be saved if the city decreased its number of civil servants by having professional appointees fill positions traditionally held by patronage appointees. In the city's ethnic newspapers, Republicans' contention that the city needed to lower, rather than equalize, the taxes, was criticized as being upper-class men looking out for their own economic interests. Harrison used this line of attack. Harrison also claimed that the Republicans' campaign of "moral uplift" and "good government" was a lightly disguised attempt to refuse the city's non-Protestant immigrant ethnic groups the right to govern until such a tie as they conformed with the Republicans' views of "proper values". While Chicago Protestant commercial establishment abhorred Harrison's willingness to work with even seedy elements of the city, this willingness to give a voice in government to the concerns of "the great unwashed" earned him great admiration in the city's ethnic neighborhoods.

During the campaign, Cregier's third-party candidacy received little regard. He was not seen as being in a position to win, though there was some view he might garner a somewhat sizable vote share.

In the past fourteen years (dating back to Harrison's first mayoral victory in 1879), Republicans had only won two mayoral elections. However, in this era, mayoral races in Chicago were still typically closely contested, and Republicans usually carried the city in national elections. The city's newspapers confidently predicted that the election would herald an Allerton victory. The day of the election, each party felt assured of their chances. On their part, Republicans hoped for an overwhelming victory. The Republican-aligned Chicago Tribune newspaper predicted that such a victory would be facilitated by a strong Republican vote in the city's German ward (where Hesing had been popular), expecting massive defections from the Democratic Party to Republican party by voters in those wards of voters (which typically leaned Democratic). This was because the bitter Democratic nomination race Harrison had faced against Hesing had turned many German voters away from supporting Harrison in the general election.

=== Results ===
Harrison won, becoming the first mayor in Chicago history to be elected to a fifth term. His victory was considered a landslide, and his roughly 21,000 vote margin of victory was the greatest of any of Harrison's mayoral victories.

The election result was considered to be a surprise, as most newspapers had predicted Allerton to have been the strong favorite to win the election.

1893 Chicago mayoral election
| Party | Candidate | Votes | % |
|---|---|---|---|
| Democratic | Carter Harrison III | 114,237 | 54.03 |
| Republican | Samuel W. Allerton | 93,148 | 44.06 |
| United Citizens | DeWitt Clinton Cregier | 3,033 | 1.44 |
| Socialist Labor | Henry Ehrenpreis | 1,000 | 0.47 |
| Turnout | | 211,418 | |

Harrison received 87.87% of the Polish-American vote, while Allerton received only 11.20%.
