= John F. Stafford =

Irish-American businessman and conservationist

John F. Stafford (August 12, 1820–December 20, 1898) was an Irish-born American businessman best-known for his ventures in Chicago and for his advocacy for the preservation of Chicago's Lake Michigan shoreline as open parkland. Stafford was born into a well-off family in Dublin, Ireland. Orphaned as a teenager, he started a career as a sailor, publishing worker, and later a businessman. After moving to Chicago in 1852, he launched several business ventures and made numerous acquisitions that amassed him a sizable fortune.

== Early life and education ==
Stafford was born in Dublin, Ireland, on August 12, 1820. He was the son of the elder John Stafford, a wealthy merchant and packer. In 1828, his family (Stafford, his parents, and his brother) moved to North America, settling in the Canadian community of Port Hope, Ontario. One year after this move, Stafford's father died. Stafford's widowed mother soon moved with her two sons to the United States city of Rochester, New York, where Stafford was raised and received the majority of his formal education.

When Stafford was sixteen years old, his mother gave him the choice of pursuing one of three professions: law, ministry, or medicine. Stafford opted to pursue medicine, studying on Dr. Elwood and Dr. Tobey of Rochester. He studied for one year, before his mother died (leaving him an orphan while still in his late-teens).

== Early career ==
After his mother's death, Stafford abandoned his studies of medicine, and instead became a sailor. He initially worked as a utility boy on the schooner Brown, calling at ports on Lake Ontario. After one year as a sailor, he became an apprentice to a carpenter in Ogdensburg, New York. After finding carpentry a poor fit, he returned to Rochester, where he learned his brother had moved to Buffalo, New York. He moved to join his brother in Buffalo, and found work at a newspaper office in the job of "printer's devil".

In 1837, Stafford returned to working was a sailor. During this time, he visited Chicago for the first time aboard a vessel. From 1837 to 1841, he spent his summers sailing, and his winters working in a printing office.

In 1841, Stafford purchased coffee and spice mills in Buffalo, which he ran until 1848 when he sold his ownership and purchased the brig Uncle Sam. However, the Uncle Sam was wrecked on its first voyage. He next purchased the vessel City of Buffalo, which also was wrecked. For the next several years after that, he work in the grain trade in various parts of the Southern United States, before returning to Buffalo.

== Career in Chicago ==
Stafford settled in the city of Chicago, Illinois in 1852, where he ultimately grew a sizable personal fortune. He was regarded to be a pioneer, having arrived in Chicago's earlier decades and remained a resident for nearly fifty years thereafter. In his later years, Stafford was regarded to have been one of Chicago's longest residents alive.

=== Business career ===
Upon arriving in Chicago, Stafford established a grocery store on South Water Street. He invested money from his surplus business funds into lake boats, at one point amassing a fleet of ten lake vessels.

Stafford bought a half interest in J. J. Sands' Brewery. This business secured a government contract to secure 100 barrels of high-quality ale per day to hospitals. He soon opened a wholesale liquor sale house under the name Bennett Peters & Co, with Bennnett Peters (Stafford's bookkeeper) serving as head of this successful venture.

Stafford retired from business in 1869, having amassed a great personal fortune.

=== Civic involvement and politics ===
Stafford was a member of the Republican Party. For seven months, he served as Chicago's coal oil inspector under Mayor Monroe Heath.

Stafford was a member of the committee sent by the city government to Washington, D.C. to secure funding for a public library in Dearborn Park. This effort failed to secure funding, but set the groundwork for a successful later effort to establish a public library there.

Stafford was well-involved in activism seeking to challenge the Illinois Central Railroad's ownership of much of the land of what is now Grant Park. Stafford was a member of the Lakefront Committee which led this activism. The committee had been founded at a meeting at the Tremont House, with Stafford, J. Young Scammon, and Thomas Hoyne being appointed its members. It launched a legal battle against the railroad's ownership of Lake Michigan shoreland that ultimately resulted in the Illinois Central Railroad Co. v. Illinois case decided by the United States Supreme Court. For his advocacy to preserve Chicago's lakefront as open parkland, Stafford was popularly dubbed "the watchdog of the lakefront".

As a civic booster, Stafford promoted the arts in Chicago. He was a supporter of the Chicago Academy of Design. After the Great Chicago Fire, he served as the custodian and disburser of an $8,000 fund that New York artists had established to provide relief to Chicago artists impacted by the fire. Stafford also led an effort that amassed an impressive fine arts collection for display at one of the city's early expositions. A painted portrait of Stafford was created by Thomas Le Clear for display at the 1875 Chicago Interstate Industrial Exposition.

== Personal life and death ==
In 1854, Stafford married the former Elizabeth Cadwallader of Buffalo, New York. They had two daughters together, Juniata and Minna. Eight years into their marriage, Stafford was widowed.

Stafford was a member of the Episcopal Church, and was a vestryman of Chicago's Trinity Church.

Stafford died on December 20, 1898 at the age of 78, after suffering a fall on icy pavement the previous day.
