= 1877 Chicago mayoral election =

- April 3, 1877
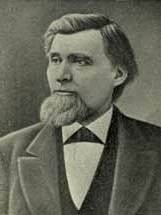

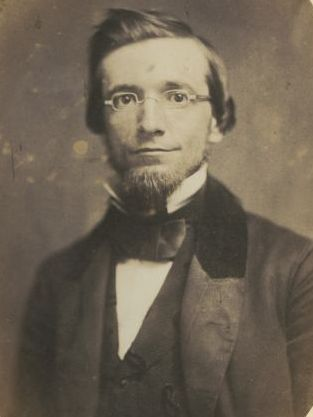
| Nominee | Monroe Heath | Perry H. Smith |
| Party | Republican | Democratic |
| Popular vote | 30,881 | 19,449 |
| Percentage | 61.36% | 38.64% |
Mayor before election
Monroe Heath
Republican
Elected mayor
Monroe Heath
Republican

In the Chicago mayoral election of 1877, Republican Monroe Heath was reelected, defeating Democrat Perry H. Smith by a more than twenty point margin.

On April 23, 1875, Chicago had voted to operate under the Cities and Villages Act of 1872. This moved its mayoral elections from November to April. The 1877 election was the first Chicago mayoral election to be scheduled in accordance with this change (the disputed April 1876 election was nullified because it had not been officially scheduled). As a result, the election took place on April 3.

== Results ==
Heath won reelection by a large majority. Republicans managed to sweep all citywide offices in the municipal elections.

1877 Chicago mayoral election
| Party | Candidate | Votes | % |
|---|---|---|---|
| Republican | Monroe Heath (incumbent) | 30,881 | 61.36 |
| Democratic | Perry H. Smith | 19,449 | 38.64 |
| Turnout | | 50,330 | |
