= J. Young Scammon =

American politician (1812–1890)

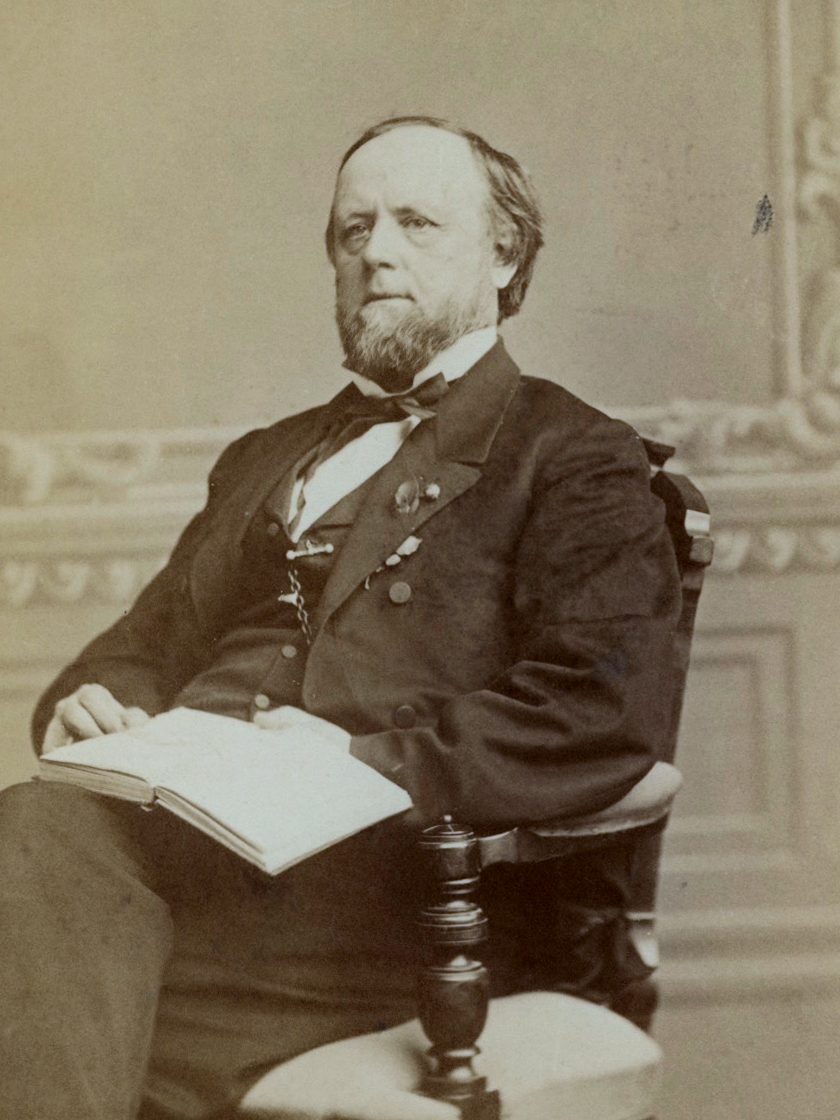
- Scammon, circa 1868

Member of the Illinois Senate from the 56th district
- In office 1861–1863

Chicago Alderman from the 1st ward
- In office 1845–1846 Serving with Thomas Church
- Preceded by: John P. Chapin and Asher Rossiter
- Succeeded by: Levi Boone and George Manierre

Chairman of the Chicago Board of School Inspectors
- In office 1843–1845
- Preceded by: William Jones
- Succeeded by: William Jones

Personal details
- Born: Jonathan Young Scammon; June 27, 1812 Whitefield, Maine
- Died: March 17, 1890 (aged 77) Chicago, Illinois
- Resting place: Oak Woods Cemetery
- Party: Whig; Free Soil; Republican
- Spouses: Mary Ann Haven Dearborn (m. 1837; died 1858) Maria Gardner Wright (m. 1867)
- Children: 4
- Education: Waterville College
- Occupation: Lawyer, banker, publisher

Jonathan Young Scammon (July 27, 1812 – March 17, 1890) was an early settler in Chicago, Illinois, arriving in the city in 1835. He went on to become politically important as a lawyer, banker, and newspaper publisher. His first wife was Mary Ann Haven Dearborn, a niece of General Henry Dearborn, with whom he had four children. His second wife was Maria Gardner Wright.

== Early life and education ==
Scammon was born in Whitefield, Maine, on July 27, 1812. His father was Eliakim Scammon, who spent stints serving in both the Maine State House and Maine Senate. Scammon was brothers with Eliakim P. Scammon and Charles Melville Scammon.

Scammon attended Maine Wesleyen Seminary and Lincoln Academy. In 1831, Scammon graduated from Waterville College. Scammon read law in Hallowell, Maine, and would practice law throughout his life. In 1835 he was admitted to the bar in Kennebec County, Maine.

== Career ==
In 1835, after being admitted to the bar in Maine, Scammon traveled across several states, and arriving in Chicago in 1835, where he stayed to wait out poor weather. Before he could leave, however, Henry Moore, who was the incumbent deputy clerk of the Circuit Court of Cook County, told Scammon that he would be unable to finish his term as clerk, and asked Scammon to fill the office. Scammon accepted, serving as deputy clerk of the Circuit Court of Cook County from 1835 through 1836, working under Richard J. Hamilton (the clerk at the time). He, therefore, became an early settler of Chicago.

In 1836, Scammon entered a legal partnership with Buckner Stith Morris, who himself had recently arrived to the city from Kentucky. Their partnership lasted only eighteen months, with Morris leaving the practice. A year later, he began partnering with Norman B. Judd. In approximately 1845, Scammon and Judd created a formal law partnership together, which ended in 1847.

Scammon advocated for a free public school system to be established in Chicago. In 1837, Scammon created the charter for the Chicago Public School System.

In approximately 1837, Scammon would join a business venture. Along with Chicago's inaugural mayor William Butler Ogden, he built the Galena and Chicago Union Railroad, which began service in 1848 and was the first railroad from Chicago. Ogden's grandnephew would later marry Scammon's sister-in-law. When Eastern financiers refused to support the railroad, Ogden and Scammon raised the money by riding on horseback along the proposed route and taking donations from the farmers he passed. He, for a time, served as the railroad's director.

In 1837, Scammon became an attorney for the State Bank of Illinois. Scammon served as the court reporter for the Illinois Supreme Court from 1839 through 1845. He wrote volumes of reports that became the first ever published in the state, and which were considered to be of high-quality. In 1839, Scammon was appointed to the Chicago Board of School Inspectors. From 1843 through 1845, Scammon served as chairman of the Chicago Board of School Inspectors, the city's school board. Scammon served as a Chicago alderman (city councilor) from 1845 through 1846. As an alderman, Scammon advocated for public schools, and helped to secure the construction of new schools in the city.

In 1844, Scammon founded the Chicago Daily Journal, a Whig-leaning newspaper that eventually became a Republican newspaper.

Politically, Scammon was a member of the Whig Party, until the party's collapse. Scammon was an opponent of slavery. He supported Whig nominees Henry Clay in the 1844 presidential election and Zachary Taylor in the 1848 United States presidential election (supporting the later despite having already joined the Free Soil Party by the time of the 1848 election). He would frequently be approached about running for office throughout his life, but only accepted offers to be nominated three times (for alderman in 1845, for United States Congress in 1848, and for Illinois Senate in 1860).

Scammon played a key role in getting the Michigan Central Railroad extended into Chicago.

In 1848, Scammon was nominated for United States Congress by the Whig party. He lost his election by more than 1,000 votes. The district he ran in was overwhelmingly Democratic. However, Scammon did manage to lead the vote in the portions of the district which lied within the city limits of Chicago.

By the 1850s, Scammon had amassed a sizeable fortune.

Scammon would serve as president and director for a number of banks and insurance companies in Chicago. Scammon became a large stockholder in the Chicago Marine Bank in 1849. In 1851, Scammon refounded the bank and served its president. He would later found the Mechanics National Bank in 1865, and would also found the Chicago Fire and Marine Insurance Company, also serving as the president of these two ventures.

Scammon was a booster of Chicago, giving money to fund improvement projects in the city.

For a time, Scammon was a member of the Free Soil Party. He was a strong critic of the Know Nothing Party. Scammon became an early member of the Republican Party. Scammon was a delegate to the Republican National Conventions in 1864 and 1872.

He helped create Oak Woods Cemetery in 1854 and was the cemetery's first president. Scammon was involved in the founding of the Chicago Historical Society, which was created in 1856 at a group of men meeting held in Scammon's law offices. Scammon was also involved in the founding of both the Chicago Academy of Sciences and the original University of Chicago. He was an officer of in the leadership of the Chicago Academy of Sciences for a number of years. He served as a trustee of the University of Illinois, and vice president the board of trustees for a time. He also endowed a professorship at the university.

From 1857 through 1860, Scammon traveled throughout Europe with his family.

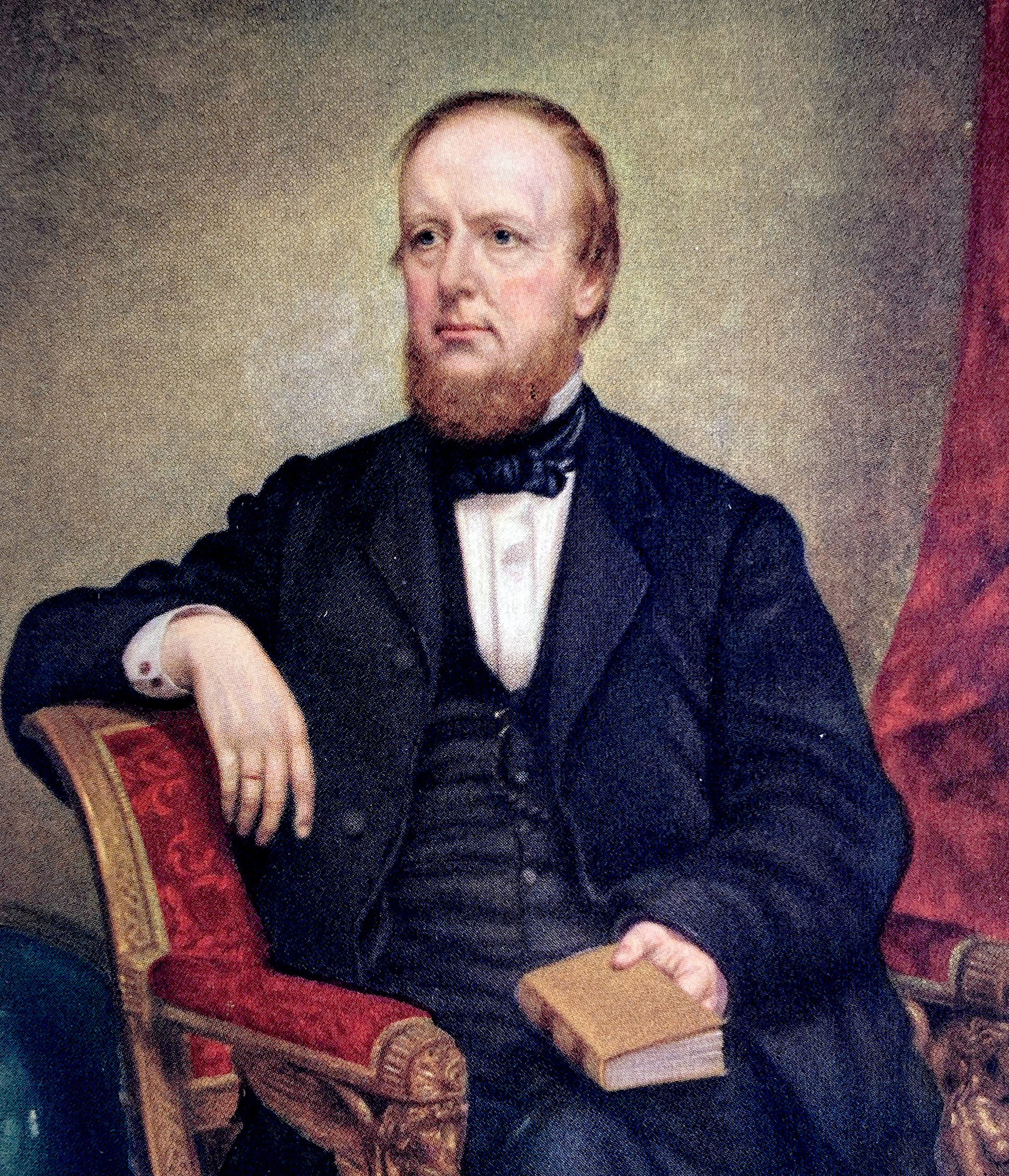
painting of Scammon

Scammon was a friend of Abraham Lincoln, and, at one point invited the Springfield lawyer to join him in his practice in his Lake Street, Chicago, office (Lincoln declined). Scammon was a supporter of Lincoln's presidential candidacy. Abraham Lincoln's son Robert would study under Scammon in his law offices.

In 1860, Scammond founded the Chicago Republican newspaper.

Scammon became a member of the Illinois Senate in January 1861, serving through 1863. He was elected as a Republican in 1860 to one of the two seats of the senate's 56th district.

Scammon was apparently active in the Underground Railroad, although he never publicly admitted as such. When he was accused of working to help slaves escape from law officers, he was asked what he would do if called upon to be part of a posse to capture fugitive slaves. Scammon replied, "I would certainly obey the summons, but I should probably stub my toe and fall down before I reached him."

Scammon wrote pieces on his view about economics and religion, and was a frequent contributor to newspapers.

In 1861, Scammon sued the Democratic-leaning newspaper Chicago Democrat for libel after publisher John Wentworth published a cartoon which depicted Scammon as a wildcat banker. Scammon dropped the quarter million dollar suit only after Wentworth closed his paper, giving the subscription list to the Chicago Tribune.

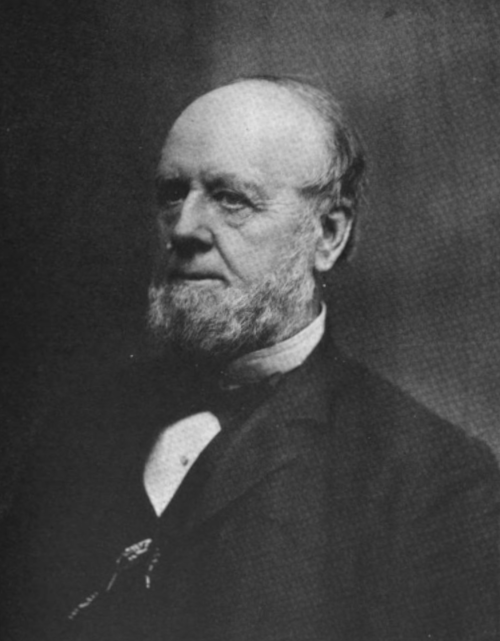
Scammon, circa 1884

Scammon was a founder of the Chicago Astronomical Society, and served as its first president from its founding until 1882. Scammon also funded the construction of the Dearborn Observatory, named for his deceased wife's maiden name. In 1863, when the Chicago Astronomical Society sought to build an observatory affiliated with the University of Chicago, Scammon offered to pay for the construction of the observatory tower and dome, provided that the observatory was named for wife, Mary Ann Haven Dearborn, an offer which the organization accepted. Scammon also paid the director's salary until financial difficulties arose following the Great Chicago Fire in 1871.

Scammon was involved in the creation of the Illinois Humane Society.

In the 1870s, Scammon began suffering financial difficulties from which he never recovered. He lost a significant amount of property in the Great Chicago Fire.

Scammonfi was a member of the Lakefront Committee, which led activism to oppose the Illinois Central Railroad's ownership of the lakefront land along Lake Michigan that is today the site of Chicago. The committee had been founded at a meeting at the Tremont House, with Scammon, John F. Stafford, Thomas Hoyne being appointed its members. The committee launched a legal battle against the railroad's ownership of shoreline land that ultimately resulted in the Illinois Central Railroad Co. v. Illinois case decided by the United States Supreme Court

Scammon was involved in the founding of Chicago's Hahnemann Hospital, and served on its board of trustees for many years, up until his death. In 1870, he donated the land and buildings for the hospital, which was originally named Scammon Hospital, but was soon renamed Hahnemann Hospital following the Great Chicago Fire. He would serve as a trustee of the hospital.

In 1872, Scammon founded the Chicago Inter Ocean newspaper, which replaced the Chicago Republican (which had gone defunct after the Great Chicago Fire) as the owner of an Associated Press franchise. He served as the newspaper's editor for a number of years. He left the newspaper after its corporate reorganization in 1875.

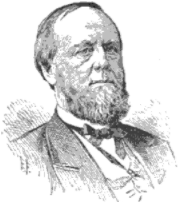
Illustration of Scammon

Scammon was involved in the Swedenborgian Church, building the first such church in Chicago, creating the Illinois Society of the Swedenborgian Church, and serving as vice-president of the United States general convention of the church for ten years. Scammon also introduced homeopathy to Chicagoans.

Scammon had a large portrait painted of him by the famous portrait painter George Healy.

Scammon died March 17, 1890, in Chicago. His death had been preceded by five weeks of illness.

== Personal life ==
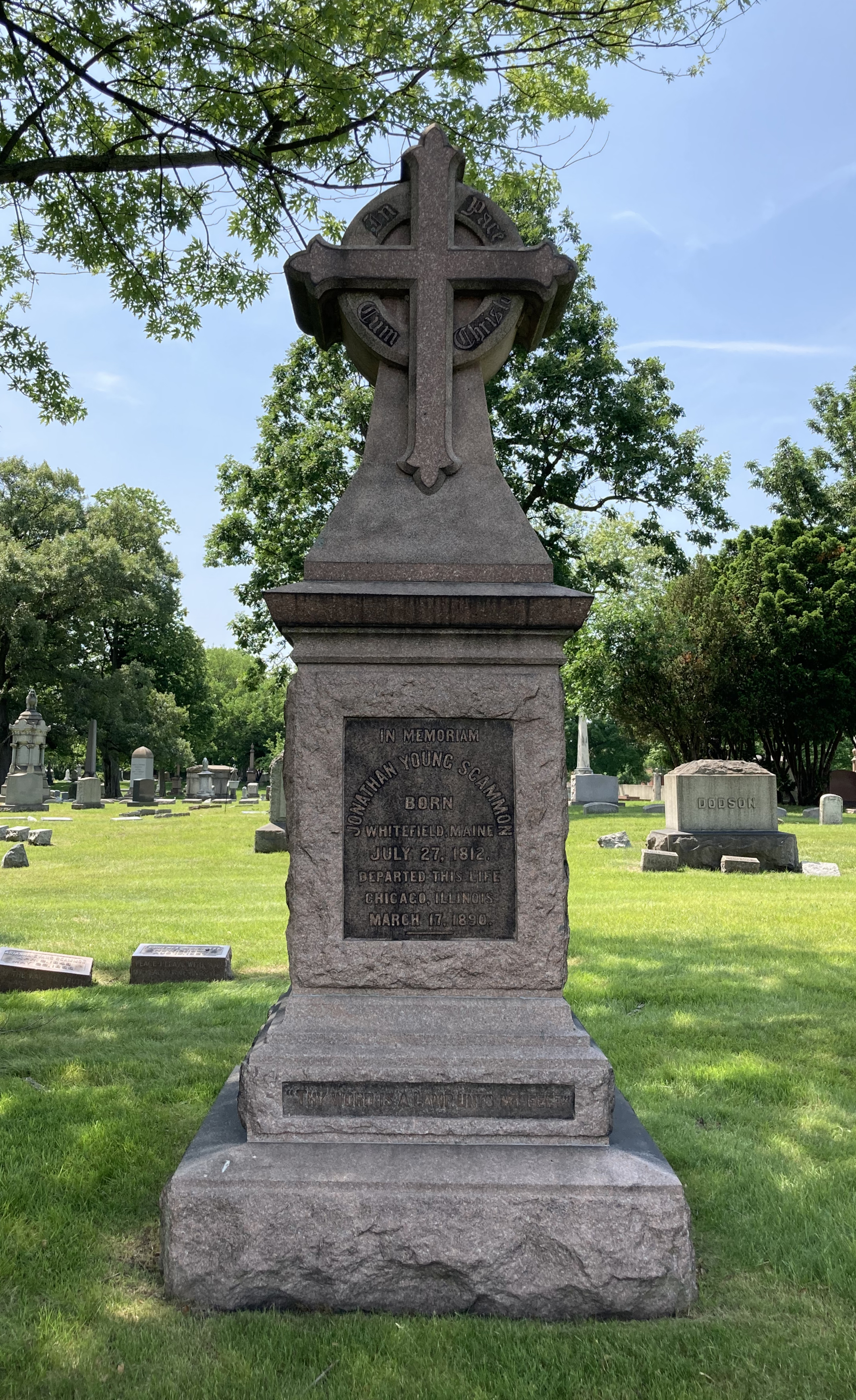
Scammon's grave at Oak Woods Cemetery

Scammon married Mary Ann Haven Dearborn in 1837, and they had four children. She died in 1858. In 1867, he remarried to Maria Gardner Wright.

He died at his home in Chicago on March 17, 1890, and was buried at Oak Woods Cemetery.

He was the brother of Eliakim P. Scammon, who was a career officer in the United States Army and Brigadier General in the Union Army. He was also the brother of Charles Melville Scammon who is a 19th-century whaleman, naturalist and author of Marine Mammals of the Northwestern Coast (1874).

Scammon's son Charles T. Scammon, at one point, was the legal partner of Robert Lincoln. Charles died young in 1876.

== Honors and tributes ==
Scammon received honorary Legum Doctors from the University of Chicago in 1862 and from Waterville College in 1869.

The Jonathan Y. Scammon Chicago Public School - Level 1+, a neighborhood school in Chicago was named after Scammon.
