= 1873 Chicago mayoral election =

- November 4, 1873
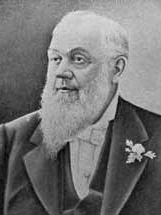

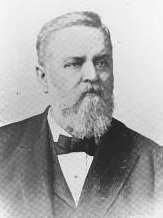
Nominee	Harvey Doolittle Colvin	Lester Legrant Bond
Party	People's Party	Citizen's Union
Popular vote	28,791	18,540
Percentage	60.83%	39.17%
Mayor before election
Joseph Medill/Lester L. Bond
Fireproof /Citizen's Union
Elected mayor
Harvey Doolittle Colvin
People's Party

The Chicago mayoral election of 1873 saw People's Party (campaigning under the label "Democratic People's Union") candidate Harvey Doolittle Colvin defeated Citizen's Union (campaigning under the label "Law and Order") candidate Lester Legrant Bond by a landslide nearly 34-point margin. Bond was the incumbent acting mayor, having taken office due to the extended absence of Joseph Medill.

The election took place on November 7.

== Campaign ==
A key issue in the election was the "beer question", regarding whether Chicago should enforce blue laws banning the sale of alcohol on Sundays. The People's Party opposed the enforcement of blue laws, a stance which the Chicago Tribune would opine led to the People Party's victory in the city's elections. The People's Party was effectively the stand-in in the elections for the national Republican Party. However, thousands of the city's Republicans instead voted for the People's Party because they too opposed blue laws.

In the election, Bond was endorsed by all of the city's major newspapers, with the exception of the Chicago Times.

The defeat of Bond led to the dissolution of the Chicago-based Citizen's Union Party.

== Results ==
1873 Chicago mayoral election
Party	Candidate	Votes	%
People's Party	Harvey Doolittle Colvin	28,791	60.83
Citizen's Union Party	Lester Legrant Bond (incumbent)	18,540	39.17
Turnout		47,331	
