= M. C. Mehta v. Kamal Nath =

1996 Supreme Court of India environmental law case

M.C.Mehta v. Kamal Nath
- Court: Supreme Court of India
- Full case name: M.C.Mehta v. Kamal Nath and Ors.
- Decided: 13 December 1996
- Citation: (1997) 1 SCC 388

Court membership
- Judges sitting: Kuldip Singh, S. Saghnr Ahma

Case opinions
- The public trust doctrine, as discussed by the Court in this judgment was a part of the law of the land
- Decision by: Kuldip Singh

M. C. Mehta v. Kamal Nath was a landmark case in Indian environmental law. In the case, the Supreme Court of India held that the public trust doctrine applied in India.

== Facts of the case ==
The Indian Express published an article reporting that Span Motels Private Limited, which owns Span Resorts, had floated another ambitious venture, Span Club. The family of Indian politician Kamal Nath has direct links with this company. The club was built after encroaching upon 27.12 bighas (16.95 acres) of land, including substantial forestland, in 1990. The land was later regularised and leased out to the company on 11 April 1994.

The regularisation was done when Nath was Minister of Environment and Forests. This encroachment led to the swelling of the Beas River, and the swollen river changed its course and engulfed the Span Club and the adjoining lawns, washing it away. For almost five months now, the Span Resorts management has been moving bulldozers and earth movers to turn the course of the Beas for a second time.

A worrying thought was that of the river eating into the mountains, leading to landslides which were an occasional occurrence in that area. In September, these caused floods in the Beas and property estimated to be worth Rs. 105 crore was destroyed. The Government of India, Ministry of Environment and Forests by the letter dated 24.11.1993, addressed to the Secretary, Forest, Government of Himachal Pradesh, Shimla conveyed its prior approval in terms of Section 2 of the Forest (Conservation) Act, 1980 for leasing to the Motel 27 bighas and 12 biswas of forest land adjoining to the land already on lease with the Motel. An expert committee formed to assess the situation of the area arrived at the following conclusion;

"The river is presently in a highly unstable regime after the extraordinary floods of 1995, and it is difficult to predict its behaviour if another high flood occur in the near future. A long-term planning for flood control in the Kullu Valley needs to be taken up immediately with the advice of an organisation having expertise in the field, and permanent measures shall be taken to protect the area so that recurrence of such a heavy flood is mitigated permanently".

== Arguments for the defendants ==
- Whatever construction activity was done by the motel on the land under its possession and on the area around, if any, was done with a view to protect the lease-hold land from floods.
- Divisional Forest Officer permitted the motel to carry out the necessary works subject to the conditions that the department would not be liable to pay any amount incurred for the said purpose by the motel.

However, it could be easily ascertained from the facts that the Motel had made various constructions on the surrounding area and on the banks of the river.

== Judgment of the court ==
The forest lands which have been given on lease to the Motel by the State Governments are situated at the bank of the river Beas. Beas is a young and dynamic river. The river is fast-flowing, carrying large boulders, at the time of flood. When water velocity is not sufficient to carry the boulders, these are deposited in the channel often blocking the flow of water. Under such circumstances the river stream changes its course, remaining within the valley but swinging from one bank to the other. The right bank of the river Beas where the motel is located mostly comes under forest, the left bank consists of plateaus, having steep banks facing the river, where fruit orchards and cereal cultivation are predominant. The area being ecologically fragile and full of scenic beauty should not have been permitted to be converted into private ownership and for commercial gains.

=== Doctrine of Public trust under Roman Law ===
The notion that the public has a right to expect certain lands and natural areas to retain their natural characteristic is finding its way into the law of the land. The ancient Roman Empire developed a legal theory known as the "Doctrine of the Public Trust". It was founded on the ideas that certain common properties such as rivers, sea-shore, forests and the air were held by Government in trusteeship for the free and unimpeded use of the general public. Under the Roman Law these resources were either owned by no one (Res Nullious) or by everyone in common (Res Communious).

=== Doctrine of Public trust under English common Law ===
Under the English common law, however, the Sovereign could own these resources but the ownership was limited in nature, the Crown could not grant these properties to private owners if the effect was to interfere with the public interests in navigation of fishing. Resources that were suitable for these uses were deemed to be held in trust by the Crown for the benefit of the public. The Public Trust Doctrine primarily rests on the principle that certain resources like air, sea, waters and the forests have such a great importance to the people as a whole that it would be wholly unjustified to make them a subject of private ownership. The said resources being a gift of nature. They should be made freely available to everyone irrespective of the status in life. The doctrine enjoins upon the Government to protect the resources for the enjoyment of the general public rather than to permit their use for private ownership or commercial purposes. Three types of restrictions on governmental authority are often thought to be imposed by the public trust: first, the property subject to the trust must not only be used for a public purpose, but it must be held available for use by the general public; second, the property may not be sold, even for a fair cash equivalent; and third, the property must be maintained for particular types of uses.

=== Lake Mono Case ===
Supreme Court of California said in the Mono Lake case, "….the public trust is more than an affirmation of state power to use public property for public purposes. It is an affirmation of the duty of the state to protect the people's common heritage of streams, lakes, marshlands and tidelands, surrendering that right of protection only in rare cases when the abandonment of that right is consistent with the purposes of the trust...." Our legal system-based on English Common Law - includes the public trust doctrine as part of its jurisprudence. The State is the trustee of all natural resources which are by nature meant for public use and enjoyment. The State as a trustee is under a legal duty to protect the natural resources. These resources meant for public use cannot be converted into private ownership.

The esthetic use and the pristine glory of the natural resources, the environment and the eco-systems of our country cannot be permitted to be eroded for private, commercial or any other use unless the courts find it necessary in good faith, for the public good and in public interest to encroach upon the said resources.

The Court said that they had no hesitation in holding that the Himachal Pradesh Government committed patent breach of public trust by leasing the ecologically fragile land to the Motel management. Both the lease - transactions are in patent breach of the trust held by the State Government. The second lease granted in the year 1994 was virtually of the land which is a part of riverbed. Even the board in its report has recommended stopping the lease of the area.

== Orders of the Court ==
The public trust doctrine, as discussed by the Court in this judgment was a part of the law of the land. The prior approval granted by the Government of India, Ministry of Environment and Forest and the lease-deed dated 11.04.1994 in favour of the Motel were quashed. The lease granted to the Motel by the said lease-deed in respect of 27 bighas and 12 biswas of area, is cancelled and set aside. The Himachal Pradesh Government shall take over the area and restore it to its original-natural conditions. The Motel shall pay compensation by way of cost for the restitution of the environment and ecology of the area. The pollution caused by various constitutions made by the Motel in the riverbed and the banks on the river Beas have to be removed and reversed.
