= Thomas Hoyne =

American politician

His Honor the Mayor Thomas Hoyne
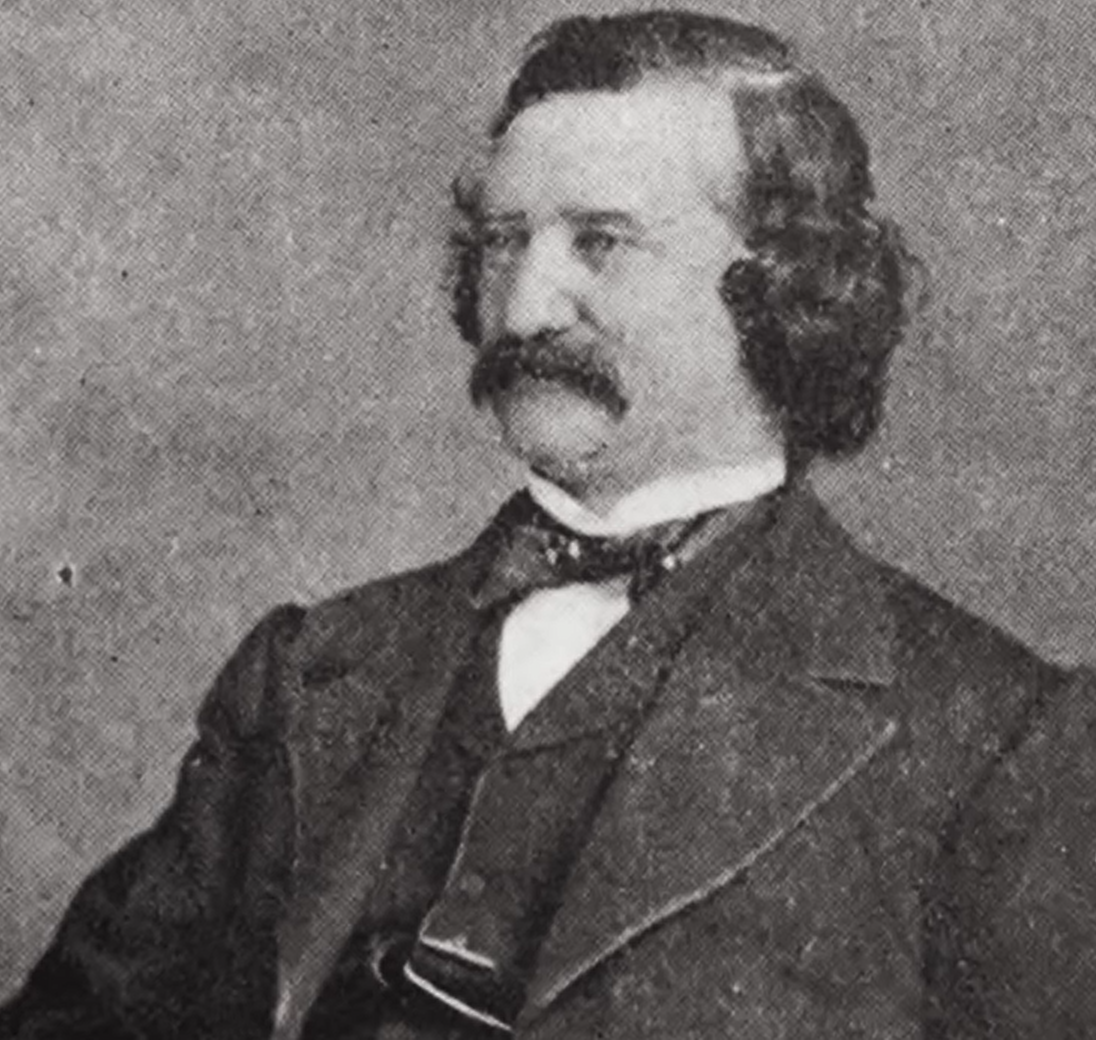

Mayor of Chicago (disputed)
- In office March 1876 (not allowed to take office)
- Preceded by: Harvey Doolittle Colvin
- Succeeded by: Harvey Doolittle Colvin

United States Marshal for the Northern District of Illinois
- In office 1860–1861
- Preceded by: Charles U. Pine
- Succeeded by: Joseph Russell Jones

United States District Attorney for the Northern District of Illinois
- In office 1855–1857
- Preceded by: position established
- Succeeded by: A.M. Herrington

United States District Attorney for Illinois
- In office 1853–1855
- Succeeded by: position abolished

Cook County Probate Justice of the Peace
- In office 1845–1848
- Succeeded by: position abolished

City Clerk of Chicago
- In office 1840–1842
- Preceded by: William H. Brackett
- Succeeded by: James Curtiss

Personal details
- Born: February 11, 1817 New York City, US
- Died: July 27, 1883 (aged 66) Carlton, New York, US
- Resting place: Rosehill Cemetery
- Party: Independent
- Spouse: Leonora Maria Temple (m. 1840)
- Children: 7, including Frank G. Hoyne
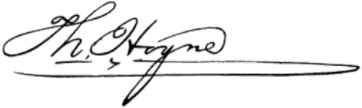
- Signature

Thomas Hoyne (February 11, 1817 – July 27, 1883) was elected Mayor of Chicago in 1876, but his election was later declared null and void by a Circuit Court. Prior to 1876, Hoyne had led a political career in which he had occupied numerous state and municipal offices.

== Life and career ==
Hoyne moved to Chicago in 1837, where he turned his back on the mercantile life he had been leading and studied law, being admitted to the bar in 1839. He was elected Chicago City Clerk in 1840. In 1853, he was appointed United States District Attorney for Illinois. Six years later, he became a US marshal for the Northern District of Illinois.

In 1863, Hoyne traveled to New York and then to Boston to acquire a lens for a telescope for the University of Chicago. In Boston, he met with Alvan Clark and purchased an 18½-inch lens and mounting for the Dearborn Observatory, at the time, the largest refracting telescope ever built. By 1866, he became one of the founding members of the Chicago Astronomical Society and served as the organization's secretary.

Following the Great Chicago Fire of 1871, Hoyne presided at the meeting that established a free library in Chicago and sat on its board of directors, eventually writing the first history of the Chicago library system. He served as president of the board.

Hoyne was a member of the Lakefront Committee, which led activism to oppose the Illinois Central Railroad's ownership of the lakefront land along Lake Michigan that is today the site of Chicago. The committee had been founded at a meeting at the Tremont House, with Hoyne, John F. Stafford, J. Young Scammon being appointed its members. The committee launched a legal battle against the railroad's ownership of Lake Michigan shoreline land that ultimately resulted in the Illinois Central Railroad Co. v. Illinois case decided by the United States Supreme Court

=== Mayoral race ===
In 1875, the city of Chicago adopted the Cities and Villages Act of 1872, which called for municipal elections to be held in April, instead of November. Harvey Doolittle Colvin, the current mayor, was informed by his attorneys that his term should be considered extended to the new elections. While the charter did not explicitly extend his term, it also failed to include the office of mayor in a call for special elections to fill the period from November to May.

In April 1876, neither the Republicans nor the Democrats nominated anyone for mayor, with both parties believing that no election for that office needed to be held until the following year. Hoyne ran as an independent, being listed on tickets. Hoyne received 33,064 of the 40,000 votes cast for mayor. He and his supporters argued that he had been elected mayor. Colvin refused to relinquish the office, insisting that his term had not expired. Colvin's continued claim to the mayoralty was supported by the city comptroller. Although Hoyne presided over council meetings and gave an inaugural address, the Cook County Circuit Court declared his claim to the mayoralty null and void. After this decision, Colvin continued to serve as mayor until the courts called for a special election on July 12, 1876.

=== Death and legacy ===
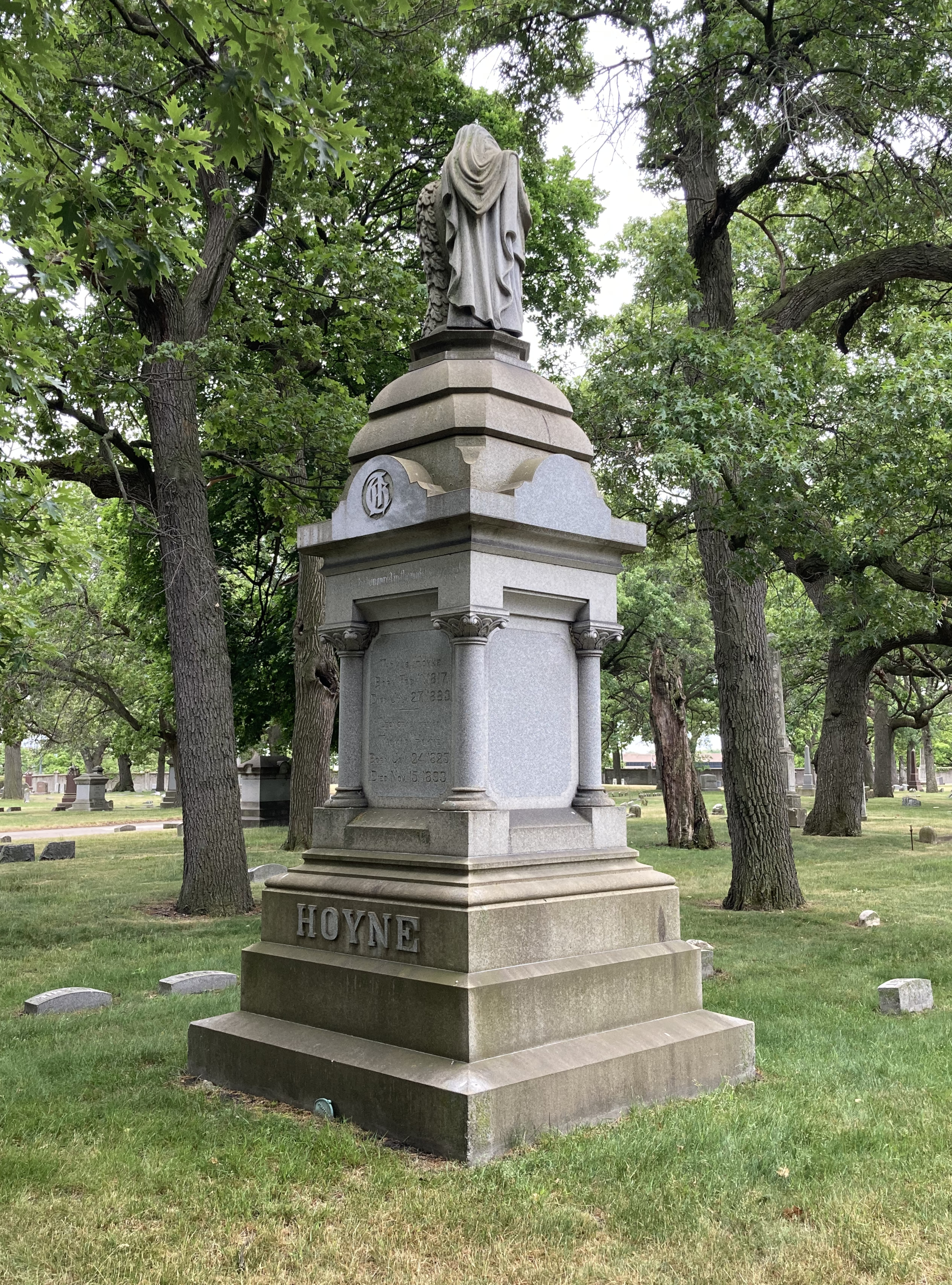
Hoyne's grave at Rosehill Cemetery

Hoyne was killed in a July 27, 1883 railroad collision on the Rome, Watertown and Ogdensburg railroad near Carlton Station. He was buried at Rosehill Cemetery in Chicago.

He is the namesake of Hoyne Elementary School in Chicago. Hoyne Avenue in Chicago is also named in his honor.

== Personal life ==
On September 17, 1840 he wed Leonora Temple.

Hoyne's younger brother Philip Augustus Hoyne served as Clerk of the Recorder's Court of Chicago and (from 1853 until 1858) United States Commissioner for the District of Illinois. He also served on the Chicago Board of Education, serving two consecutive terms as its president.
