= Public trust doctrine =

Principle regarding sovereign use of private property

The public trust doctrine is the principle that the sovereign holds in trust for public use some resources such as shoreline between the high and low tide lines, regardless of private property ownership.

== Origins ==
=== Roman law ===
Ancient Roman law set aside res communes omnium (things held in common by all) as not subject to ownership. The juristic Digest specified things which "by natural law are the common property of all" as air, flowing water, the sea, and the seashore. Things common to all human beings could not be privately owned, but they also were not seen as owned collectively by the state as res publicae, public property as the opposite of res privatae, private property. Ownership by the Roman people is expressed by publicum and includes human constructs such as marketplaces, harbors, and theatres as well as public lands.

Practical distinctions were made within the categories of res communes. Breathable air could not be owned, but "air" was distinguished from "sky": aerial space over private property could not be obstructed by someone else in a way that interfered with the owner's use. "Flowing water" was held in common by all (communis), but the water itself was distinguished from the use of the river as a whole. A navigable river was public (publicum) rather than common, meaning that it had to kept accessible for public use and might be regulated and maintained by the state, while the riverbanks and even the riverbed could be privately owned, as long as ownership did not impede the public's use of the river. Disputes over questionable diversions of commonly held water from public waterways for private use could lead to lawsuits over water rights.

In general, the right to sail and fish on the sea could not be infringed, though the sale of private seaside property might involve the voluntary contractual surrender of the right to fish in waters off the coast. The seashore, defined by the reach of the highest winter tide, was held in common and could not be owned. Private structures could be built within the high tide line, but anyone was free to walk on the beach, and if such a structure was destroyed the builder had no more title to rebuild there than anyone else.

=== England ===
This principle became the law in England as well. Centuries later, Magna Carta further strengthened public rights. At the insistence of English nobles, fishing weirs which obstructed free navigation were to be removed from rivers.

All fish-weirs are in future to be entirely removed from the Thames and the Medway, and throughout the whole of England, except on the sea-coast.

=== United States ===
These rights were further strengthened by later laws in England and subsequently became part of the common law of the United States. The Supreme Court first accepted the public trust doctrine in Martin v. Waddell’s Lessee in 1842, confirming it several decades later in Illinois Central Railroad v. Illinois, 146 U.S. 387 (1892). In the latter case the Illinois Legislature had granted an enormous portion of the Chicago harbor to the Illinois Central Railroad. A subsequent legislature sought to revoke the grant, claiming that original grant should not have been permitted in the first place. The court held that common law public trust doctrine prevented the government from alienating the public right to the lands under navigable waters (except in the case of very small portions of land which would have no effect on free access or navigation).

The public trust applies to both waters influenced by the tides and waters that are navigable in fact. The public trust also applies to the natural resources (mineral or animal) contained in the soil and water over those public trust lands.

== Application ==
This doctrine has been primarily significant in two areas: land access and use, and natural resource law.

=== Access to ocean and ponds ===
The doctrine is most often invoked in connection with access to the seashore. In the United States, the law differs among the fifty states but in general limits the rights of ocean-front property owners to exclude the public below the mean high tide line.

Massachusetts and Maine (which share a common legal heritage) recognize private property ownership to the mean low tide line—but allow public access to the seashore between the low and high tide lines for "fishing, fowling and navigation," traditional rights going back to the Colonial Ordinance of 1647. Maine's Supreme Court in 2011 expanded the public trust doctrine by concluding fishing, fowling and navigation are not an exclusive list; the court allowed the general public to cross private shoreline for scuba diving.

The public trust doctrine also finds expression in the Great Pond law, a traditional right codified in case law and statutes in Massachusetts, Maine, and New Hampshire. The state is said to own the land below the low water mark under great ponds (ponds over ten acres), and the public retains in effect an access easement over unimproved private property for uses such as fishing, cutting ice, and hunting.

In New Jersey, the Supreme Court confirmed the doctrine in "Matthews v. Bay Head Imp. Ass'n. 95 N.J. 306 (1984)".

In Oregon, a 1967 "Beach Bill" affirmed the state's public trust doctrine, and the right of the public to have access to the seashore virtually everywhere between the low and high tide marks. In California the situation is more complicated: private landowners often try to block traditional public beach access, which can result in protracted litigation. Freshwater use rights have also been subject to litigation in California, under the public trust doctrine.

In England and Wales, there is no general public right to access the foreshore. Most land between the high and low water marks is owned by the Crown Estate, who permit access for recreation, but the courts confirmed in 1821 in the case of Blundell v Catterall that there is no right of access such as the public trust doctrine. The only public right over the foreshore is to pass over it, on water in a boat, for the purposes of fishing.

=== Natural resources ===
The doctrine has also been used to provide public access across and provide for continued public interest in those areas where land beneath tidally influenced waters has been filled. In some cases, the uses of that land have been limited (to transportation, for instance) and in others, there has been provision for public access across them.

The doctrine has been employed to assert public interest in oil resources discovered on tidally influenced lands (Mississippi, California) and has also been used to prevent the private ownership of fish stocks and crustacean beds.

In most states in the United States, lakes and navigable-in-fact streams are maintained for drinking and recreation purposes under a public-trust doctrine.

In some countries, the public trust doctrine has been applied to provide environmental protection to natural resources in order to uphold human rights. A recent study also demonstrated that public trust doctrines are transnationalizing, expanding protections of public resources to a global scale.

== See also ==
- Prescriptive easement
- Equal Protection Clause
- Freedom to roam
- Illinois Central Railroad Co. v. Illinois
- Juliana v. United States
- M. C. Mehta v. Kamal Nath
- National Audubon Society v. Superior Court
- Public trust
- Public good
- Public space
- Public property
- Right of way (disambiguation)
  - Right of way (transit) (Right to cross on foot, horseback, cycle or rowboat)
  - Right of way (property access) Public highways, railways, canals etc.
- Thoroughfare
