= SS Joseph M. Medill =

Liberty ship of WWII

History

nowrap
- Name: Joseph M. Medill
- Namesake: Joseph M. Medill
- Owner: War Shipping Administration (WSA)
- Operator: Moore-McCormack Lines, Inc.
- Ordered: as type (EC2-S-C1) hull, MC hull 1523
- Builder: J.A. Jones Construction, Panama City, Florida
- Cost: $1,886,400,
- Yard number: 5
- Way number: 5
- Laid down: 28 September 1942
- Launched: 3 May 1943
- Sponsored by: Mrs. Ellen Pearson
- Completed: 31 May 1943
- Identification: Call Signal: KLHP
- Fate: Laid up in the National Defense Reserve Fleet, Wilmington, North Carolina, 20 January 1948; Sold for scrapping, 21 April 1960

General characteristics
- Class & type: Liberty ship; type EC2-S-C1, standard
- Tonnage: 10,865 LT DWT; 7,176 GRT
- Displacement: 3,380 long tons (3,434 t) (light); 14,245 long tons (14,474 t) (max)
- Length: 441 feet 6 inches (135 m) oa; 416 feet (127 m) pp; 427 feet (130 m) lwl
- Beam: 57 feet (17 m)
- Draft: 27 ft 9.25 in (8.4646 m)
- Installed power: 2 × Oil fired 450 °F (232 °C) boilers, operating at 220 psi (1,500 kPa); 2,500 hp (1,900 kW)
- Propulsion: 1 × triple-expansion steam engine, (manufactured by General Machinery Corp., Hamilton, Ohio); 1 × screw propeller
- Speed: 11.5 knots (21.3 km/h; 13.2 mph)
- Capacity: 562,608 cubic feet (15,931 m^{3}) (grain); 499,573 cubic feet (14,146 m^{3}) (bale)
- Complement: 38–62 USMM; 21–40 USNAG
- Armament: Varied by ship; Bow-mounted 3-inch (76 mm)/50-caliber gun; Stern-mounted 4-inch (102 mm)/50-caliber gun; 2–8 × single 20-millimeter (0.79 in) Oerlikon anti-aircraft (AA) cannons and/or, 2–8 × 37-millimeter (1.46 in) M1 AA guns

SS Joseph M. Medill was a Liberty ship built in the United States during World War II. She was named after Joseph M. Medill, the co-owner and managing editor of the Chicago Tribune, and Mayor of Chicago after the great fire of 1871.

== Construction ==
Joseph M. Medill was laid down on 28 September 1942, under a United States Maritime Commission (MARCOM) contract, MC hull 1523, by J.A. Jones Construction, Panama City, Florida; sponsored by Mrs. Ellen Pearson, the great-granddaughter of the namesake, she was launched on 3 May 1943.

== History ==
She was allocated to the Moore-McCormack Lines, Inc., on 31 May 1943. On 20 January 1948, she was laid up in the National Defense Reserve Fleet, in Wilmington, North Carolina. On 19 February 1960, she was sold for $70,161, to Bethlehem Steel, for scrapping. She was removed from the fleet on 21 April 1960.

== Bibliography ==
- "Jones Construction, Panama City FL". ShipbuildingHistory.com. 13 October 2010.
- Maritime Administration. "Joseph M. Medill". Ship History Database Vessel Status Card. U.S. Department of Transportation, Maritime Administration.
- Davies, James (May 2004). "Specifications (As-Built)" (PDF). p. 23.
- "SS Joseph M. Medill".
