= Public trust =

Concept in politics

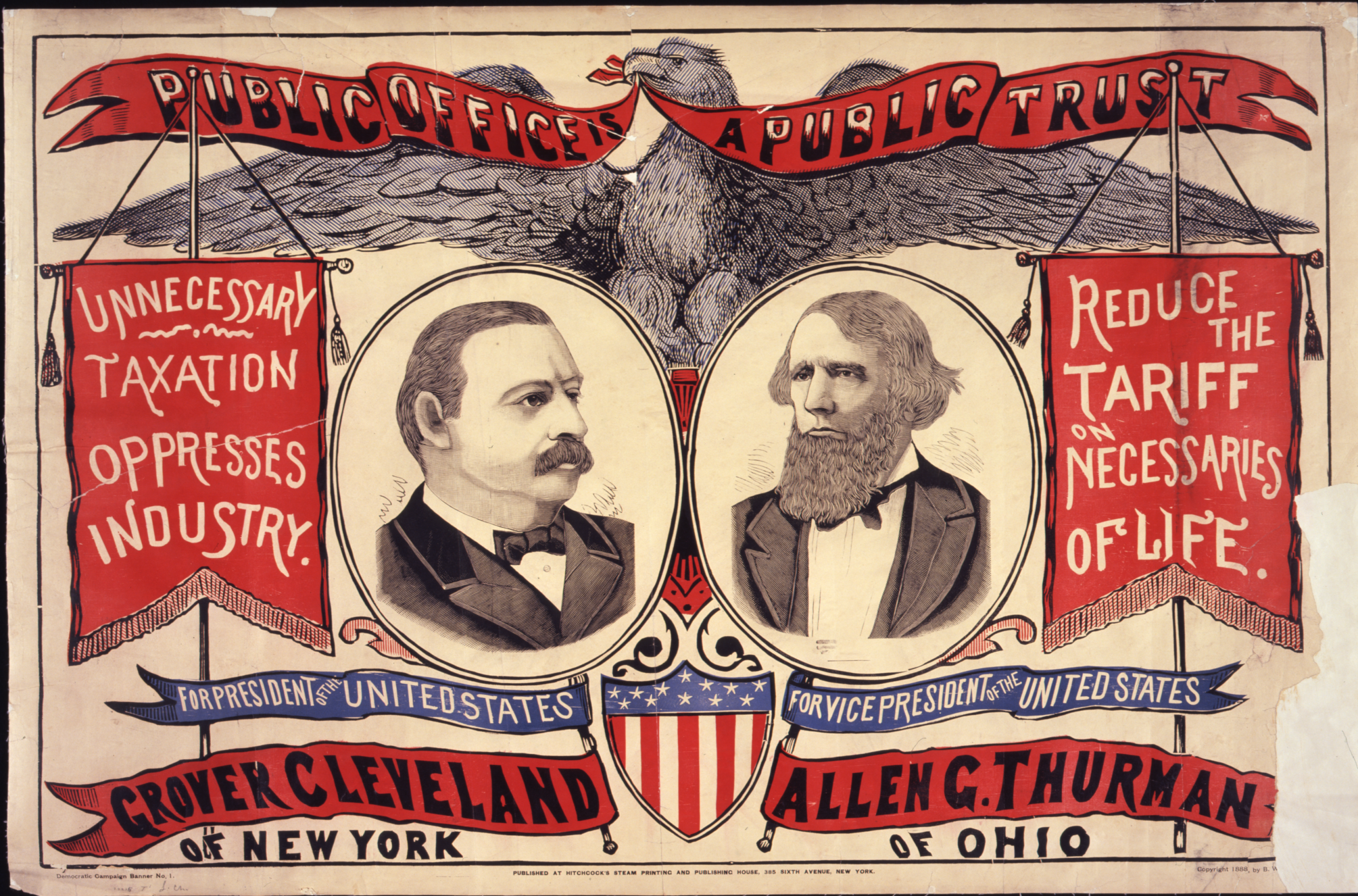
Public office is a public trust

The concept of public trust relates back to the origins of democratic government and its seminal idea that within the public lies the true power and future of a society; therefore, whatever trust citizens place in its officials must be respected. One of the reasons that bribery is regarded as a notorious evil is that it contributes to a culture of political corruption in which public trust is eroded. Other issues related to political corruption or betrayal of public trust are lobbying, special interest groups and the public cartel.

== United States ==
In the United States "Public Trust" is a term of art referring to any public property which belongs to the whole of the people. Initially it was used within the formation of the government to refer to politicians who achieve power by election. In the United States Constitution, all members of Congress as well as the President, and Vice President are elected seats therein. The first state constitution drafted in the United States was the Maryland Constitution of 1776, which expressed that all persons vested with the legislative and executive powers of government are public trustees.

The Constitution of Maryland, Art. IV, V

IV. That all persons invested with the legislative or executive powers of government are the trustees of the public, and, as such, accountable for their conduct; wherefore, whenever the ends of government are perverted, and public liberty manifestly endangered, and all other means of redress are ineffectual, the people may, and of right ought, to reform the old or establish a new government. The doctrine of non-resistance, against arbitrary power and oppression, is absurd, slavish, and destructive of the good and happiness of mankind.

V. That the right in the people to participate in the Legislature is the best security of liberty, and the foundation of all free government; for this purpose, elections ought to be free and frequent, and every man, having property in, a common interest with, and an attachment to the community, ought to have a right of suffrage.

=== Members of the Legislature ===
In The Federalist Papers #57, Alexander Hamilton defended the concept of a House of Representatives within the new Constitution by referring to those elected representatives as holding a public trust, obtained through election, and held accountable to the people through term limits.

THE THIRD charge against the House of Representatives is, that it will be taken from that class of citizens which will have least sympathy with the mass of the people.... Whilst the objection itself is levelled against a pretended oligarchy, the principle of it strikes at the very root of republican government. The aim of every political constitution is, or ought to be, first to obtain for rulers men who possess most wisdom to discern, and most virtue to pursue, the common good of the society; and in the next place, to take the most effectual precautions for keeping them virtuous whilst they continue to hold their public trust. The elective mode of obtaining rulers is the characteristic policy of republican government. The means relied on in this form of government for preventing their degeneracy are numerous and various. The most effectual one, is such a limitation of the term of appointments as will maintain a proper responsibility to the people.

=== The Executive ===
In The Federalist Papers #70 Alexander Hamilton addresses the Presidency in a discussion over having more than one executive, referring to the "magistry" being an elective office, as a public trust:

But one of the weightiest objections to a plurality in the Executive, and which lies as much against the last as the first plan, is, that it tends to conceal faults and destroy responsibility. Responsibility is of two kinds to censure and to punishment. The first is the more important of the two, especially in an elective office. Man, in public trust, will much oftener act in such a manner as to render him unworthy of being any longer trusted, than in such a manner as to make him obnoxious to legal punishment.

George Washington opened his farewell address in 1796 inviting the people to elect a new executive to his "important trust:"

The period for a new election of a citizen to administer the executive government of the United States being not far distant, and the time actually arrived when your thoughts must be employed in designating the person who is to be clothed with that important trust

=== The Constitution ===
A Public Trust is the term used when referring to elected officials in the United States Constitution, to differentiate them from civil officers. For example, the No Religious Test clause of Article VI includes both civil officers (commissioned either by the President

or the Constitution) and elected officials directly:

...but no religious test shall ever be required as a qualification to any office or public trust under the United States.

Founding Father Thomas Jefferson is popularly cited for his statement in a letter to Baron von Humboldt:

When a man assumes a public trust, he should consider himself as public property.

Public trust is different from an office of trust, which is an officer. The descriptive term public is referring to public ownership of the trust.

In 1892 the United States Supreme Court found in Illinois Central Railroad Co. v. Illinois that states have public ownership of all submerged land in navigable waters, determining that states manage these lands in trust for the citizens and that no state legislature can abdicate its authority as the trustee of these resources. This added natural resources to the concept of public trust. Certain cultural resources were later also added as a public trust.

== Use in the Philippines ==
In the Philippines, "betrayal of public trust" is one of the impeachable offenses. In Francisco, Jr. vs. Nagmamalasakit na mga Manananggol ng mga Manggagawang Pilipino, Inc., the Supreme Court of the Philippines ruled that the definition of "betrayal of public trust" is "a non-justiciable political question which is beyond the scope of its judicial power" under the Constitution. It did not prescribe which branch of government has the power to define it, but implies that Congress, which handles impeachment cases, has the power to do so.

== See also ==
- Political efficacy – Citizens' trust in their ability to influence politics
- Public trust doctrine
- Institutional trust
