= Perry H. Smith =

19th century American politician

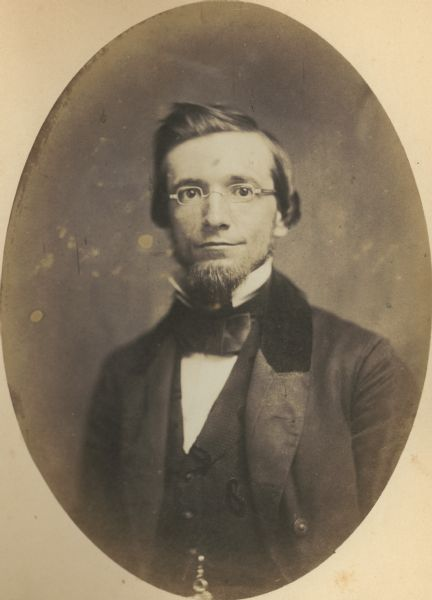
- 1858 photo by John Fuller

Member of the Wisconsin Senate from the 2nd district
- In office January 7, 1856 – January 4, 1858
- Preceded by: Joseph F. Loy
- Succeeded by: Morgan Lewis Martin

Member of the Wisconsin State Assembly from the Outagamie district
- In office January 4, 1858 – January 2, 1860
- Preceded by: Theodore Conkey
- Succeeded by: Daniel C. Jenus

Member of the Wisconsin State Assembly from the Oconto–Outagamie–Waupaca district
- In office January 1, 1855 – January 7, 1856
- Preceded by: David Scott
- Succeeded by: Louis Bostedo

Personal details
- Born: Perry H. Smith; March 18, 1828 Augusta, New York, U.S.
- Died: March 29, 1885 (aged 57) Chicago, Illinois, U.S.
- Resting place: Graceland Cemetery, Chicago
- Spouses: Emma A. Smith; (m. 1851; died 1915)
- Children: Perry H Smith, Jr.^{(b. 1854; died 1914)}; Ernest Smith; Emma K. (Sawyer)^{(b. 1858; died 1918)}; Dunlap Smith^{(b. 1863; died 1901)}
- Parents: Timothy Smith (father); Lucy Avery Smith (mother)
- Education: Hamilton College
- Occupation: 1877, Candidate for mayor of Chicago; Vice president of the Chicago and North Western Railroad; Vice president of the Chicago, St. Paul and Fond du Lac Railroad; County judge for Outagamie County, Wisconsin

Perry H. Smith, Sr., (March 18, 1828 – March 29, 1885) was an American judge, politician, and railroad executive. He served two years in the Wisconsin State Senate (1856–1857) and three years in the State Assembly (1855, 1858, 1859), representing Outagamie County. He was an unsuccessful candidate for mayor of Chicago in 1877.

== Biography ==
Born in Augusta, New York, to Timothy Smith and Lucy Avery Smith, Smith graduated from Hamilton College second in his class and at the age of 18. He then studied law and was admitted to the New York Bar. In 1845, he moved to Kenosha, Wisconsin, and then to Milwaukee and Appleton, Wisconsin. At the age of 23, he was elected the first county judge for Outagamie County, Wisconsin. He served in the Wisconsin State Assembly 1855, 1858–1859 and the Wisconsin State Senate 1856–1857 as a Democrat.

In 1851, Smith married Emma (maiden name not known). They had four children, Perry H. Smith, Jr., Ernest Fitz Smith, Emma Keeney Smith, and Dunlap Smith.

In 1857, Smith became vice president of the Chicago, St. Paul and Fond du Lac Railroad. The assets of that railroad were purchased in June 1859 by the new Chicago and North Western Railroad, and Perry was named as vice-president of that. A locomotive of the new line was named in his honor, but it was wrecked in an accident on November 1, 1859 when an ox ran onto the track.

In 1860, he moved to Chicago, Illinois. He became a director of Crystal Lake Ice Company, formed to bring ice from Crystal Lake in McHenry County to Chicago via the Chicago and North Western Railroad. In 1866, Perry donated half of the $25,000 cost for a new library building at his alma mater, Hamilton College, Clinton, NY, and participated in the laying of the cornerstone on July 18. The building was completed and opened in 1872 as the Perry Hiram Smith Library. In 1924, it underwent its first renovation to become the Knox Infirmary. In about 1964 it was transformed into Minor Theater. In 2015, it became a residence hall and was renamed Morris House.

In January 1869, Smith became a charter member of the new Chicago Club, a private social club.

In 1869, he left the railroad and went into private business. He organized an excursion party from June 22 to July 29, 1869, over the newly completed transcontinental Union and Central Pacific Railroad lines to California for 28 leading businessmen, statesmen, judges, lawyers and railroad executives. Among the notables on that trip were William B. Ogden, who had been first mayor of Chicago and later was the first president of the Union Pacific railroad, and John Insley Blair.

In October 1869, he took his family on an extended trip through Europe, based in Brussels and parts of Asia and Africa. He returned to the U.S. in November for business and to visit his father, and rejoined his family in December. They were in Moscow when the Franco-Prussian War began, and in August 1871 the family returned to the U.S.

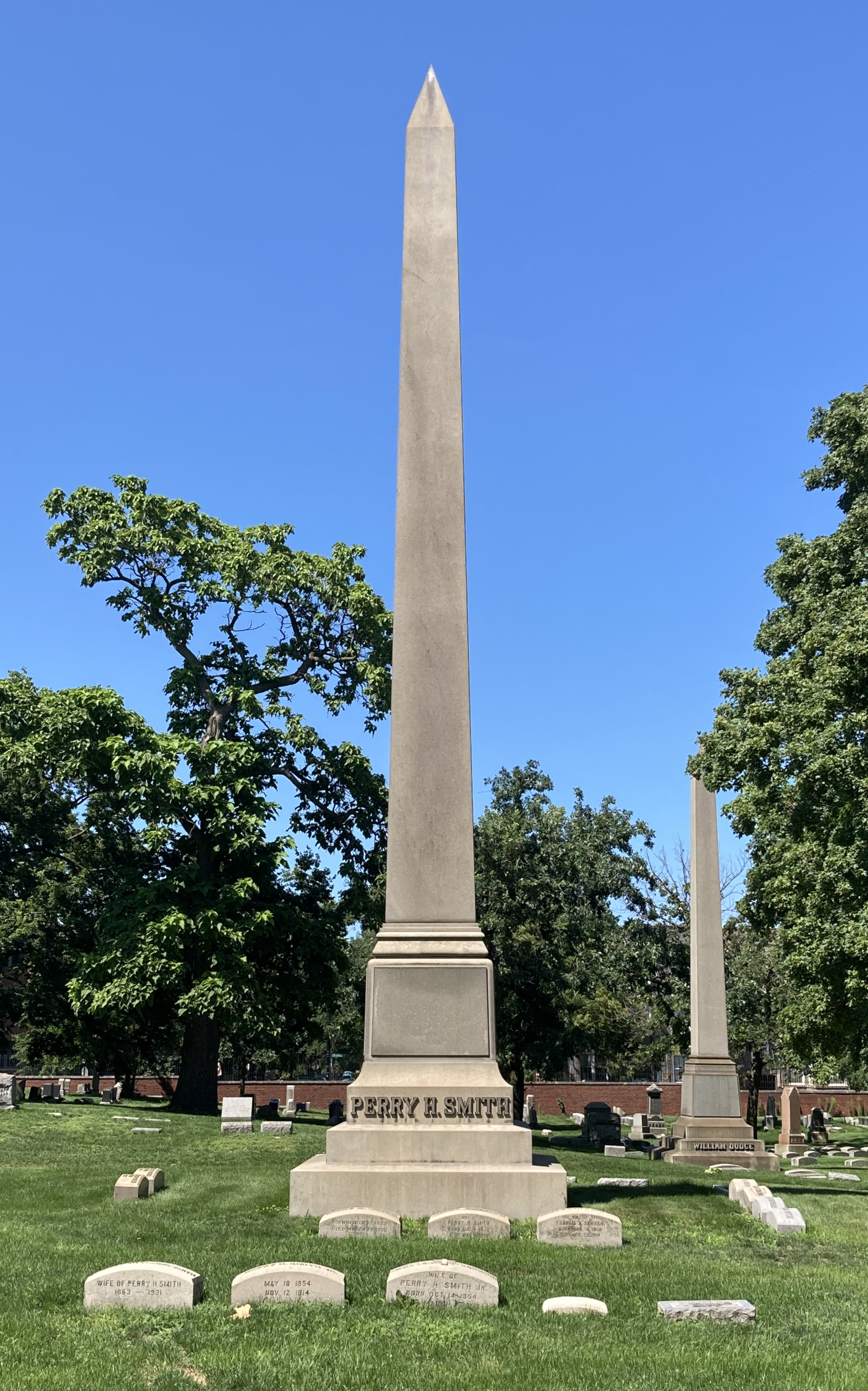
Smith's grave at Graceland Cemetery

After the Great Chicago Fire of 1871, he built a home at the corner of Pine (now Michigan Avenue) and Huron at a cost of some $200,000. One author wrote that "Perry Smith ... made his home in one of the gaudiest town houses created by Cudell and Blumenthal. Its three stories of Joliet marble, its stairway of ebony enriched with gold, and its dining room with carved panels portraying rabbits, ducks, squirrels, and prairie chicken were famous throughout the Middle West." Like many business leaders of the day, at his home Smith hosted lavish occasions, including (for example) a party for Cyrus McCormick's son's coming-of-age. That home was torn down around 1918 to make way for the widening of Michigan Avenue. Perry Smith's son, Perry H. Smith, Jr., later built a mansion in 1886 at 1400 N. Astor St. which sold most recently in 2017 for $4 million.

In 1877, Smith ran for Mayor of Chicago and lost the election to Monroe Heath. Later that year he was a delegate to the Democratic National Convention, where he worked for the nomination of his personal friend, Samuel J. Tilden.

Perry's health declined following a trip to Europe in 1882, with his mental condition deteriorating. He was committed to a sanitarium in Wisconsin in 1883. He died of congestion of the liver in Chicago, Illinois on March 29, 1885, and was buried in a family plot at Graceland Cemetery, Chicago. His estate, including the home, was variously valued at $5 million and from $750,000 to $1 million. His will was filed in April 1885 and set the value at $600,000, half of that in real estate.

== Notes ==
Party political offices
Preceded by Mark Kimball	Democratic nominee for Mayor of Chicago; 1877	Succeeded by Carter Harrison III
