= Harvey Doolittle Colvin =

American politician

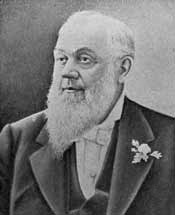

27th Mayor of Chicago
- In office December 1, 1873 – July 24, 1876
- Preceded by: Joseph Medill, (Lester L. Bond)
- Succeeded by: (Thomas Hoyne), Monroe Heath

Personal details
- Born: December 18, 1815 Herkimer County, New York, US
- Died: April 16, 1892 (aged 76) Jacksonville, Florida, US
- Resting place: Rosehill Cemetery
- Party: People's Party

Harvey Doolittle Colvin (December 18, 1815 – April 16, 1892) was an American politician. Colvin is best remembered for his stint as mayor of Chicago, Illinois from 1873 to 1875 as a member of the People's Party, a pro-liquor factional offshoot of the Republican Party centered in that city.

== Early life ==
Harvey Doolittle Colvin was born December 18, 1815, in Herkimer County, New York.

== Political career ==
Immediately prior to serving as Chicago's mayor, Colvin served as the city's treasurer. In the 1873 Chicago mayoral election, he ran against acting mayor Lester L. Bond and won with 60% of the vote. Colvin was sworn as mayor on December 1, 1873. His campaign was supported by political boss Michael Cassius McDonald. One month after taking office as mayor, Colvin was met with a mass demonstration at City Hall when more than 12,000 unemployed workers marched for jobs and relief. The crowd dispersed after being promised the city would provide relief when an alderman offered to buy them food throughout the winter if the city would reimburse him.

Colvin's administration repealed a Sunday ban on liquor sales which his predecessor, Joseph Medill and Bond supported. In 1874, Colvin's administration was rocked by allegations of patronage and a scandal in the city treasurer's office. The Chicago Fire of 1874 destroyed 812 buildings and was so destructive that the Chicago Board of Underwriters refused to issue insurance policies unless Chicago reformed its fire department. A settlement was reached in which the city would require more construction using brick or stone, increase the size of the water mains, and move the lumberyards outside the city.

David Allen Gage, the City Treasurer of Chicago, was $507,704 short in the city's accounts. He was indicted, but was acquitted. When Monroe Heath assumed the mayoralty after Colvin he discovered that the city had $5.5 million in uncollected taxes.

When the city council called for elections following the adoption of the Cities and Villages Act of 1872 in 1875, they left the office of mayor off the list of offices for the election. Despite this, Thomas Hoyne ran for the office and was elected. Colvin, however, refused to vacate the office and retained the title and position of mayor despite Hoyne's inauguration, partly due to the support of the city comptroller.

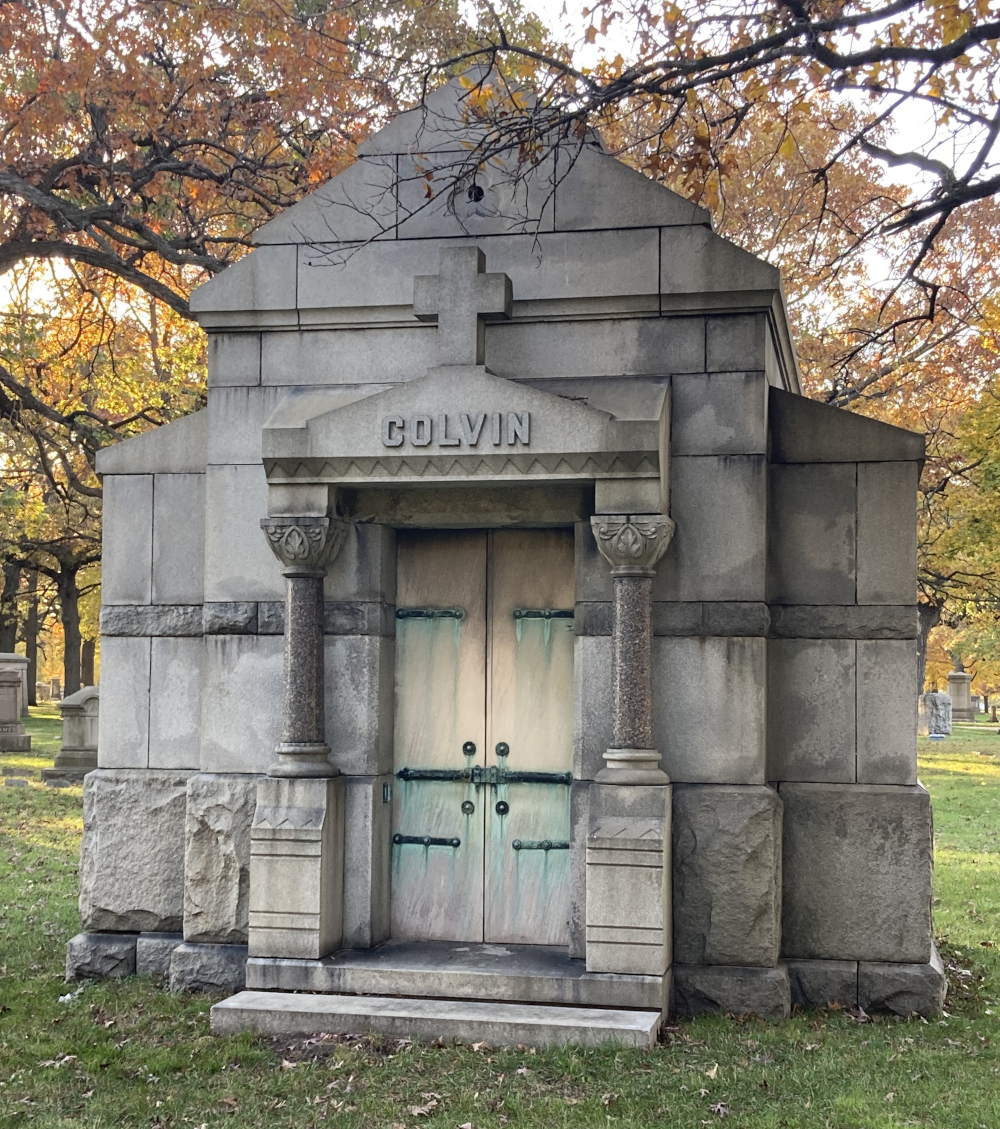
Colvin mausoleum at Rosehill Cemetery

In 1876, a state judge ordered a special election be held later in the year. Monroe Heath, the Republican candidate beat his two rivals, James J. McGrath of the Democratic Party, and Mark Kimball of Colvin's now discredited People's Party. Heath was sworn in as Colvin's successor on July 24, 1876.

== Death and legacy ==
Colvin died in Jacksonville, Florida on April 16, 1892. His body was buried in Rosehill Cemetery in Chicago.

== Works cited ==
- Merriner, James (2004). Grafters and Goo Goos: Corruption and Reform in Chicago, 1833-2003. Southern Illinois University Press. ISBN 0809325713.
