= Monroe Heath =

American politician

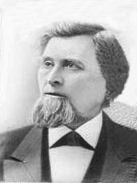

28th Mayor of Chicago
- In office July 24, 1876 – April 28, 1879
- Preceded by: Harvey Colvin
- Succeeded by: Carter Harrison III

Chicago Alderman from the 12th ward
- In office 1871–1875 Serving with Arba N. Waterman
- Preceded by: Samuel McCotter
- Succeeded by: S.H. McCrea

Personal details
- Born: March 27, 1827 Grafton, New Hampshire
- Died: October 21, 1894 (aged 67) Asheville, North Carolina, United States
- Party: Republican

Monroe Heath (March 27, 1827 – October 21, 1894) was a U.S. politician. He served as Mayor of Chicago, Illinois (1876–1879) elected as a member of the Republican Party, after winning the 1876 election. He was re-elected the following year, defeating Perry H. Smith.

== Early life and career ==
Born in Grafton, New Hampshire, he took part in the California Gold Rush in 1849. In 1851, he founded the Heath & Milligan Manufacturing Company in Chicago. Illinois.

== Chicago City Council ==
Heath served as an alderman on the Chicago City Council from 1871 through 1876, representing the twelfth ward. For his first term on the council, he had been elected on the "Fireproof" ticket in 1871 (on which Joseph Medill was elected mayor in the coinciding mayoral election).

== Mayoralty ==
After winning the 1876 election, Heath was sworn in as Mayor of Chicago on July 24, 1876. He was re-elected the following year (defeating Perry H. Smith) and was sworn in for his second term on April 30, 1877. His tenure as mayor ended on April 28, 1879.

== Post-mayoralty ==
He died in Asheville, North Carolina. He is buried in Oak Woods Cemetery.

Party political offices
Preceded by n/a	Republican nominee for Mayor of Chicago; 1876 (sp.), 1877	Succeeded by Abner Wright
