= 1876 Chicago mayoral elections =

The Chicago mayoral elections of 1876 is one of only two instances in which a Chicago mayoral election was declared invalid (the other being in 1844).

After an election was held in April under disputed circumstances, and was subsequently nullified by the courts, a special election was held in July.

Republican Monroe Heath won the special election in July, thus becoming mayor of Chicago.

These are the last Chicago mayoral elections (including special elections) to take place in an even-numbered year. They are also the only elections since 1862 to have been held in an even-numbered year.

== Disputed April election ==
April 1876 Chicago mayoral election
- April 16, 1876
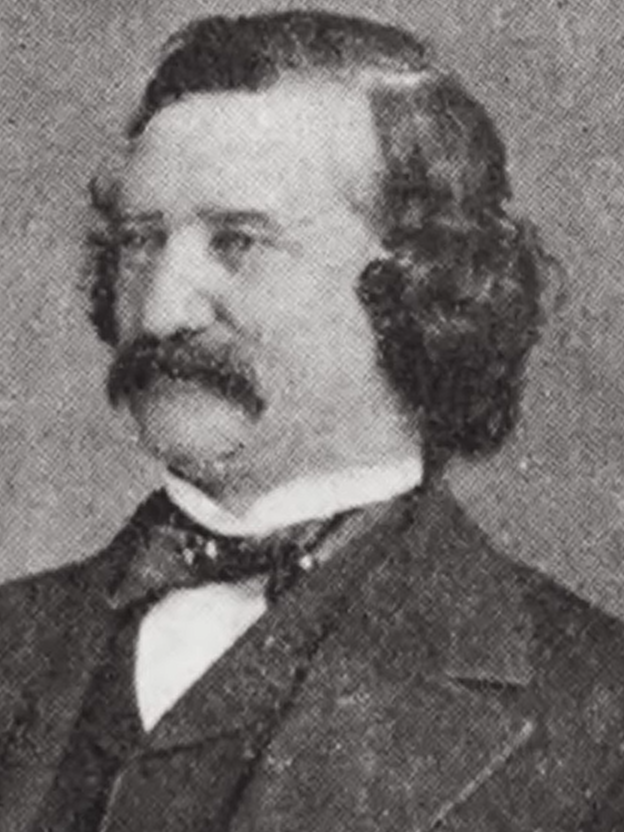
| Nominee | Thomas Hoyne |
| Party | Independent Democrat |
| Popular vote | 33,064 |
| Percentage | 97.59% |
Mayor before election
Harvey Doolittle Colvin
People's Party
Elected mayor
Disputed

The disputed Chicago mayoral election of April 1876 was won by Thomas Hoyne. However, its result was ultimately nullified by the courts.

=== Background ===
Illinois' Cities and Villages Act of 1872 had moved municipal elections from November to April and had extended mayoral terms to two years. It went into effect in July 1872. On April 23, 1875, the city of Chicago had voted to operate under the Act, as opposed to operating under the rules outlined by its city charter.

Since the act mandated mayoral elections to be held in April of odd-numbered years, incumbent mayor Harvey Doolittle Colvin believed that his term had been extended and that no elections were to be held in November 1875 or April 1876. He believed that a mayoral election would not be held until April 1877.

=== Election ===
Recognizing that Colvin would be unseated if a mayoral election were held, Chicago's city council (which was, at the time, composed of many members that were friendly towards the mayor) left the office of mayor off its list of offices for election. Thus, neither the Republican nor Democratic Parties believed they needed to put forth mayoral candidates, assuming that this meant that no mayoral election was scheduled to be held.

Despite this Thomas Hoyne, at the time president of the Chicago Public Library's board of directors, opted to run for mayor. He was nominated at a mass meeting. Thousands voted for Hoyne by including his name on their ballots. Both the Democratic and Republican parties ultimately put him on their tickets. He won nearly all of the votes cast for mayor in the municipal election held on April 16, 1876. However, a mayoral election had not been formally called for by the City Council or the mayor's office.

=== Results ===
Despite there being no authorization for such a count to be taken, a popular vote count of mayoral votes was taken when ballots were counted in Chicago's municipal elections. However, the city council ignored this count when it canvassed and made official the election results.

April 1876 Chicago mayoral election
| Party | Candidate | Votes | % |
|---|---|---|---|
| Independent Democrat | Thomas Hoyne write-in | 33,064 | 97.59 |
| Scattering | Scattering | 819 | 2.42 |
| Turnout | | 33,883 | |

== Legal dispute ==
The city council which had been elected in a (non-disputed) April election (in which many Colvin allies lost their seats) took office on April 8. On its first day the new city council declared that Hoyne was the city's mayor, that the vote that had been taken for mayor was actually binding. Hoyne took an oath of office on May 9 and attempted to assume the office of mayor. However, Colvin disputed Hoyne's claim to the office, arguing that the election had been illegitimate and that he was still entitled to serve an additional year as mayor.

The City Council and most departments of the municipal government supported Hoyne's claim to the mayoral office. However, the city's comptroller and police department rejected Hoyne's claim, and supported Colvin in the resulting standoff.

During the city standoff, the police blocked Hoyne from going inside the mayor's office at city hall. Meanwhile, with the support of the City Council, Hoyne fired supporters of Colvin from municipal jobs. Both men offered to possibly resign, but neither actually acted on their offers.

=== Outcome ===
Ultimately, after a 28-day conflict, the dispute was resolved by the courts. At a June 5 meeting of the Circuit Court of Cook County, William K. McAllister ruled that the April election had been illegitimate. This meant that Hoyne's "tenure" as mayor had been annulled. Colvin was permitted to extend his mayoral term until a special election would be held. A special election was ultimately held on July 12, electing Monroe Heath as mayor.

Subsequently, in August, it was requested for city attorney to issue an opinion on whether or not Hoyne and the municipal apartment heads he had appointed should receive any remuneration. It was opined that, while Hoyne had not been mayor de jure, he had served as mayor de facto, thus he and his appointees should be awarded payment for the time they acted in their positions.

== July special election ==
1876 Chicago mayoral special election
- July 12, 1876
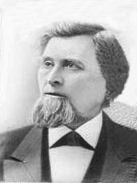

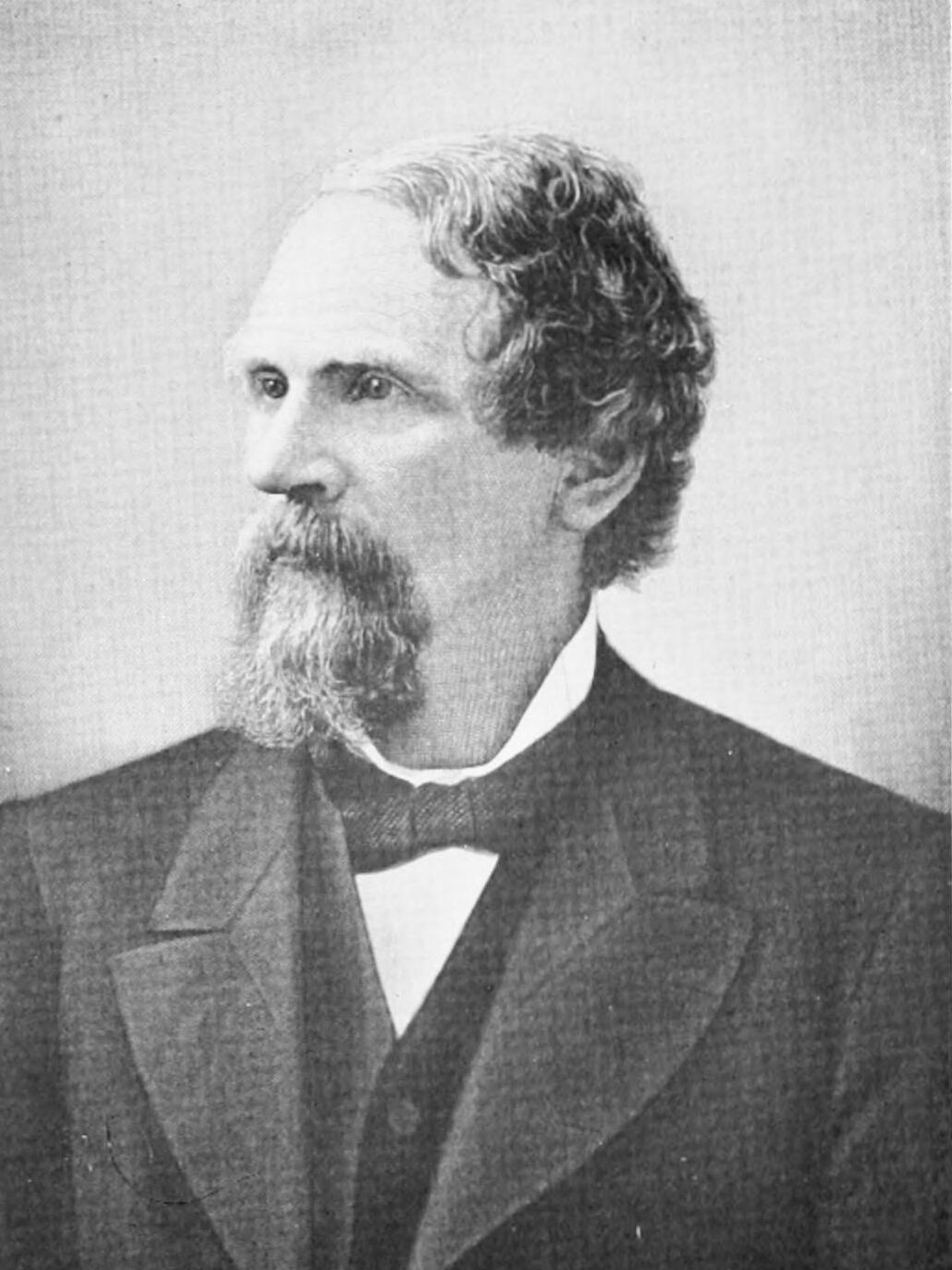

| Nominee | Monroe Heath | Mark Kimball | James J. McGrath |
| Party | Republican | Democratic | Independent Democrat |
| Popular vote | 19,248 | 7,509 | 3,363 |
| Percentage | 63.90% | 24.93% | 11.17% |
Mayor before election
Harvey Doolittle Colvin
People's Party
Elected mayor
Monroe Heath
Republican

In the Chicago mayoral special election of 1876, Monroe Heath defeated Democrat Mark Kimball and independent James J. McGrath by a landslide 39-point margin.

The election was held on July 12, 1876, and had been called for as part of the Circuit Court of Cook County ruling that had been issued to resolve the dispute over the legitimacy of the disputed election that had been held in April.

At a July 1 convention, the Republican party, which had supported (Democratic-leaning) Thomas Hoyne in the dispute over the 1876 election, opted to nominate their own candidate for the special election. They believed that the April 1876 aldermanic elections, which had seen a Republican landslide, indicated strong prospects of a Republican candidate winning the special mayoral election. Thus, they nominated Monroe Heath for mayor. Heath was a "Reform" Republican.

Mark Kimball was nominated by the Democratic Party. Kimball was a successful businessman, as well as the South Town tax collector. He had first made a name for himself in the insurance business, serving separate tenures as director, secretary, and assignee for the Mutual Security Insurance company as well as tenures as the president and manager of the Citizens Insurance Company of Chicago. He had also led a successful career in banking and other business.

James J. McGrath (a former member of the Chicago City council) ran as a Democratic-leaning independent aligned with Colvin's politics. The Chicago Tribune reported than Alderman Mark Sheridan and State Senator Miles Kehoe had encouraged McGrath to wirthdraw his candidacies, warning him that he lacked chances at election.

The Chicago Tribune (a Republican paper) warned Chicagoans that it believed that if McGrath were elected,

Vice would flourish ten times more luxuriently in our city than it does today, and Chicago might as well as shut up shop, for McGrath is in favor of making offices for his friends, raising our indebtedness, and doing anything that will tend to ruin this city.

=== Endorsements ===
Monroe Heath
- James L. Campbell, former alderman
- S.T. Gunderson, former alderman

=== Results ===
Chicago voters, rebuking Colvin, elected Republican Monroe Heath in a landslide. His margin of victory was roughly 39 points, a percentage which itself was significantly greater than either of his opponents' vote shares.

1876 Chicago mayoral special election
| Party | Candidate | Votes | % |
|---|---|---|---|
| Republican | Monroe Heath | 19,248 | 63.90 |
| Democratic | Mark Kimball | 7,509 | 24.93 |
| Independent Democrat | James J. McGrath | 3,363 | 11.17 |
| Turnout | | 30,120 | |
