= Lester L. Bond =

American politician

Lester Bond
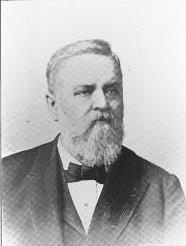

Acting Mayor of Chicago
- In office August 22, 1873 – December 1, 1873
- Preceded by: Joseph Medill
- Succeeded by: Harvey Doolittle Colvin

Chicago Alderman
- In office 1871–1873 Serving with Charles C. P. Holden (1871–1872); David W. Clark Jr. (1872–1873)
- Preceded by: Thomas Wilco
- Succeeded by: Charles L. Woodman
- Constituency: 10th ward
- In office 1863–1866 Serving with George Von Hollen (1863–1865); S.I. Russell (1865–1866)
- Preceded by: constituency established
- Succeeded by: Henry Ackoff
- Constituency: 11th Ward

Member of the Illinois House of Representatives from the 59th district
- In office 1867–1871 Serving with Joseph S. Reynolds (1867–71), Horace M. Singer (1867–68), and Henry B. Miller (1869–71)
- Preceded by: Ansell B. Cook, Nathan W. Huntley, and William Jackson
- Succeeded by: legislature reapportioned after enactment of 1870 state constitution

Personal details
- Born: October 27, 1829 Ravenna, Ohio, U.S.
- Died: April 15, 1903 (aged 73) Chicago, Illinois, U.S.
- Resting place: Rosehill Cemetery
- Party: Republican
- Spouse: Mary Aspenwall
- Children: Laura Bond Jackson

Lester Legrant Bond (October 27, 1829 – April 15, 1903) was an American lawyer and politician who served as a member of the Illinois state House of Representatives and a member of the Chicago City Council (at the time known as the "Common Council"). He served several months of 1873 as the acting mayor of Chicago, having been appointed by Mayor Joseph Medill in 1873 to assume this role while Medill traveled through Europe.

== Early life and education, ==
Bond was born to Jonas and Elizabeth Bond. and grew up on his father's farm in Ravenna, Ohio.

In Ravenna, studied law, initially under Francis W. Tappen. He later studied under other Ohio attorneies. He was admitted to the bar in October 1853, and traveled to Chicago the following year.

== Law and business careers ==
In 1854, he formed a legal partnership with A.S. Seaton. By 1858, he had partnered with E.A. West.

In 1859, Bond began representing patent law cases. In 1860, he focused himself on patent law. He would ultimately establish himself as one of the most skilled patent attorneys in the United States. In 1864, he formed the legal partnership West, Bond, & Driscoll. After Driscoll withdrew in 1865 to become Chicago city attorney, the firm became West & Bond. With the firm, Bond had many corporate clients, and represented clients in hundreds of cases in federal circuit courts, particularly defending agriculture-related corporate clients. The law firm would remain in operation until 1891.

== Political career ==
Inspired by his father having been a member of the Free Soil Party member in 1844, bond served as a town delegate to the party's 1852 convention in Pittsburgh. Later, Bond became a staunch Republican, being one of the founders of the Republican organization in Chicago.

=== Chicago alderman (1863-1866) ===
In 1862 and 1864, Bond was elected a Chicago alderman representing the 11th Ward on the Chicago Common Council (city council). His first term was for a single year, while his second was for two years. He declined to seek a third term, citing a desire to focus on his business.

=== Illinois House of Representatives (1867–71) ===
In 1867, he became a member of the Illinois House of Representatives. He was re-elected in 1869, and served until 1871. Dujring his first term, he was a member of the Committee on Internal Improvements, where he involved himself in the adoption of an act pertaining to improvements along the Illinois River. During his second term, he served on the Judiciary, which was considered the most important committee in the body.

=== Chicago Board of Education ===
Bond also served on the Chicago Board of Education.

=== Chicago City Council (1871–73) ===
Bond rejoined the Chicago Common Council in 1871, being elected in the 1871 election to represent the 10th ward despite his wishes not to have been a candidate. He served through 1873.

In 1872, he served as an Illinois presidential elector representing the state's 2nd congressional district.

==== 1873 acting mayoralty and mayoral campaign ====
Before Chicago Mayor Joseph Medill traveled to Europe in 1873, on August 18 he named Bond to serve as acting mayor of Chicago in his absence. Bond assumed the office on August 22. With Medill's term set to expire that same year, Bond ran for mayor as an independent on a law and order platform, supporting laws which would ban the sale of liquor on Sundays. He was defeated by Harvey Colvin, who won with 60% of the voted despite Bond receiving the endorsements of all Chicago newspapers except the Times.

== Personal life and death ==
On October 12, 1856 Bond married Annie Scott Aspinwall, the daughter of Reverend Nathaniel W. Aspinwall of Vermont. They had one daughter, Laura, who was born in 1867.

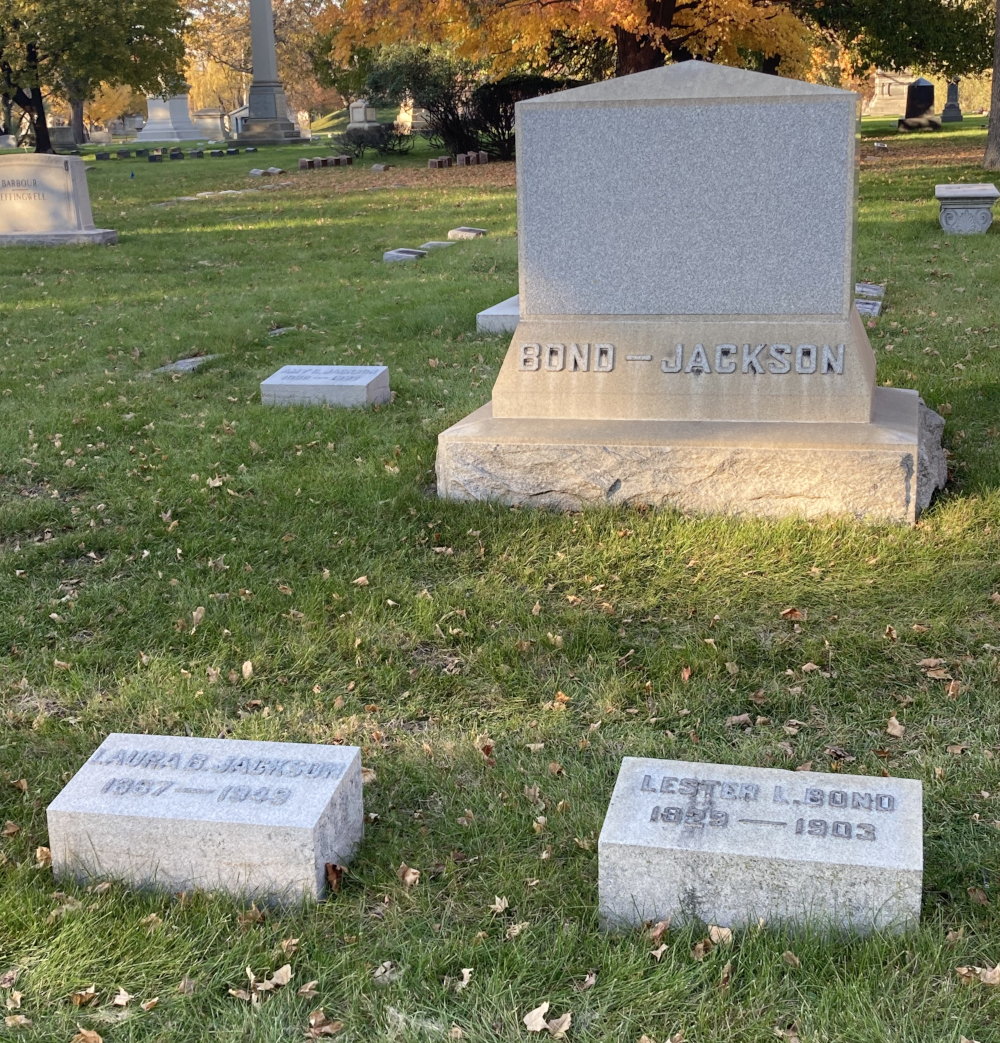
Bond's grave at Rosehill Cemetery

Bond died due to stroke at his home in Chicago on April 15, 1903, and was buried at Rosehill Cemetery.
