= Teenager (word) =

Word used to describe a young person who is 13 to 19 years old

Teenager (shortened to teen) is a numeric term for a person from the ages of 13 to 19 years. People aged 9 to 12 years old are placed in the category of preteen, also called tween.

Although teenager is primarily a numeric term, it is commonly used to describe humans in the process of transitioning from childhood to adulthood (primarily 13 to 19 years old) who are experiencing the physical changes of puberty, and is conflated with adolescent. However, the developmental changes of adolescence, such as puberty (particularly in females) and the transition from primary to secondary school, typically begin around the preteens, while cognitive and physical maturation continue into the 20s. Thus, the teenage years only provide a very approximate age range of adolescence.

Despite its commonality in everyday usage, teenager is a relatively modern introduction to the English language, which debuted in print around the 1910s, and did not become popular until around the late 1940s and early 1950s as a marketing neologism.

== Etymology ==
Teenager is derived from the adjective teenage, which is named after the suffix -teen appearing in the numbers representing ages 13 to 19 and forming the name of said numerals.

Not all languages include a morpheme in their spelling of numbers 13–19, so they may not have a numeric equivalent to teenager and may use the same word for adolescent in their translation for teenager. For example, teenager in Spanish translates to adolescente the same way adolescent does, since the Spanish language does not include a morpheme in its version of numbers 13–19. Meanwhile, people in these foreign cultures may just be considered children or young adults with no recognized intermediate stage.

== History ==
The earliest recorded usage of the word teenager in print was in 1913 in a Wilmington, Delaware newspaper called Every Evening Commercial, Wilmington Daily, where it was capitalized and treated as two separate words (Teen Ager) and used in an article about county Sunday schools. The text read, "Some of the best practical workers among 'Teen Agers' will be present and speak." However, during this time it was treated as a slang term and not recognized by the public due to its exclusive use in local newspaper articles. The word continued to be spelled this way or hyphenated in print until around 1941, where the Popular Science magazine was credited for the first usage of teenager as a singular conjoined term.

Before this, the adjective teenage gained its first recorded usage in an Evening Tribune newspaper from Albert Lea, Minnesota in 1912, where it was also treated as two separate words (teen age), similar to the later teenager. It was used in the sentence, "Margaret Slattery [...] will deliver six lectures on the development of teen age boys and girls". Much like teenager, the adjective did not see the treatment of a singular word until the early 1940s.

Even earlier, the prototype to the noun was attested teener and coined in 1894.

The noun teen in reference to a person aged 13 to 19 years dates back to 1597 in William Shakespeare's tragedy play Romeo and Juliet, said by the Nurse in reference to 13-year-old Juliet.

I’ll lay fourteen of my teeth (and yet, to my teen be it spoken, I have but four) she’s not fourteen.

— William Shakespeare, Romeo and Juliet, Scene 3

Nevertheless, the earliest age-related terminology based on the suffix is teens, referring to the life stage. The earliest recorded usage of teens in this sense dates to the 1590s. Although, it was spelled as Teenes, and did not gain its modern spelling until 1664 when The Cheats was published by John Wilson.

== Public recognition and marketing ==
During the 1930s and '40s, teenager gained traction as a term used by marketers to emphasize on the spending powers of American high school students. After World War II, a new stage of life was being recognized due to the generation gap many youths experienced between their parents as a result of being brought up in a war generation. Marketers wanted to recognize this emerging phenomenon as a period involving rebellion and experimentation with youth subcultures, also taking note of America's compulsory schooling extension into high school after the 1938 ban on child labor. As such, the term teenager rose to popularity throughout advertising, with several companies catering to the fashion, music, transportation, film, literature and magazine preferences of high schoolers; several different subcultures were catered to.

One of the earliest mentions of the word ‘teenager’ in the British Newspaper Archive was in a fashion-related magazine article from The Sketch in 1945, called ‘Teen-age Triumphs.’ Another early usage comes from an advert for Nestlé's Milo in the West London Observer called 'Trouble With a Teen-Ager', published March 1950. The cartoon depicts a teenage girl and her mother, the latter of whom remarks ‘Sally’s so difficult these days.’ Her friend advises that like all teenagers, Sally simply ‘needs building up’ – naturally, with the help of Milo, a cup of which is sure to ‘bring a smile-o.’

In his short book The Teenage Consumer published in July 1959, the British market research pioneer Mark Abrams identified the emergence of a new economic group of people aged 13–25. Compared to children, people in this age range had more money, more discretion on how they chose to spend it, and greater mobility through the advent of the motor car. Compared to adults, people in this age range had fewer responsibilities and therefore made different choices on how to spend their money. These unique characteristics of this new economic group presented challenges and opportunities to advertisers. Mark Abrams rose the term to widespread use to describe this group of consumers.

== Criticism ==
Thomas Hine expressed in a 1999 American Heritage article called The Rise and Decline of the Teenager that he thought of the term as little more than a lazy way of describing young people and has connotations of ageism and infantilization. He wrote, "The term encompasses a contradictory grab bag of beliefs, prejudices, and expectations. It can allow us to build a wall around an age group and to assume that its members’ problems can safely be ignored." Hine wrote in the same article under The Teenage Mystique chapter that the word embodies extreme ambivalence about the people it describes with a wide range of stereotypes that contradict society's expectations for them.

Rebecca Grant of The Guardian criticized the term for how many negative connotations it has for a word that is merely intended to describe the numeric order of an age group, bringing attention to the many prejudices older people exhibit to youth and stereotypes of irrational and dangerous behavior. She wrote of being more in favor of "young people" or any other label that acknowledges them as human beings rather than discrediting them based solely on their age.

Dr. Michael Platt wrote in issue #2 of Practical Homeschooling in a 1993 article called "Myth of the Teenager" that he thought of the term as a label that encourages young people to shun responsibility and delay their entry into adulthood.

Richard Fisher wrote in a 2022 BBC Family Tree article that he thinks a new word describing young people between childhood and adulthood should be coined due to the outdated connotations associated with teenager and the evolution in youth culture from the last 100 years.

The Psychology Today article 'A 20-Second Experiment in Racial Stereotypes' points out that attributes of delinquency, emotional volatility, sex and rebellion immediately come to mind when describing teenagers without knowing anything about them on a case-by-case basis.
