= Joseph Medill =

American newspaper editor, publisher, and politician (1823–1899)

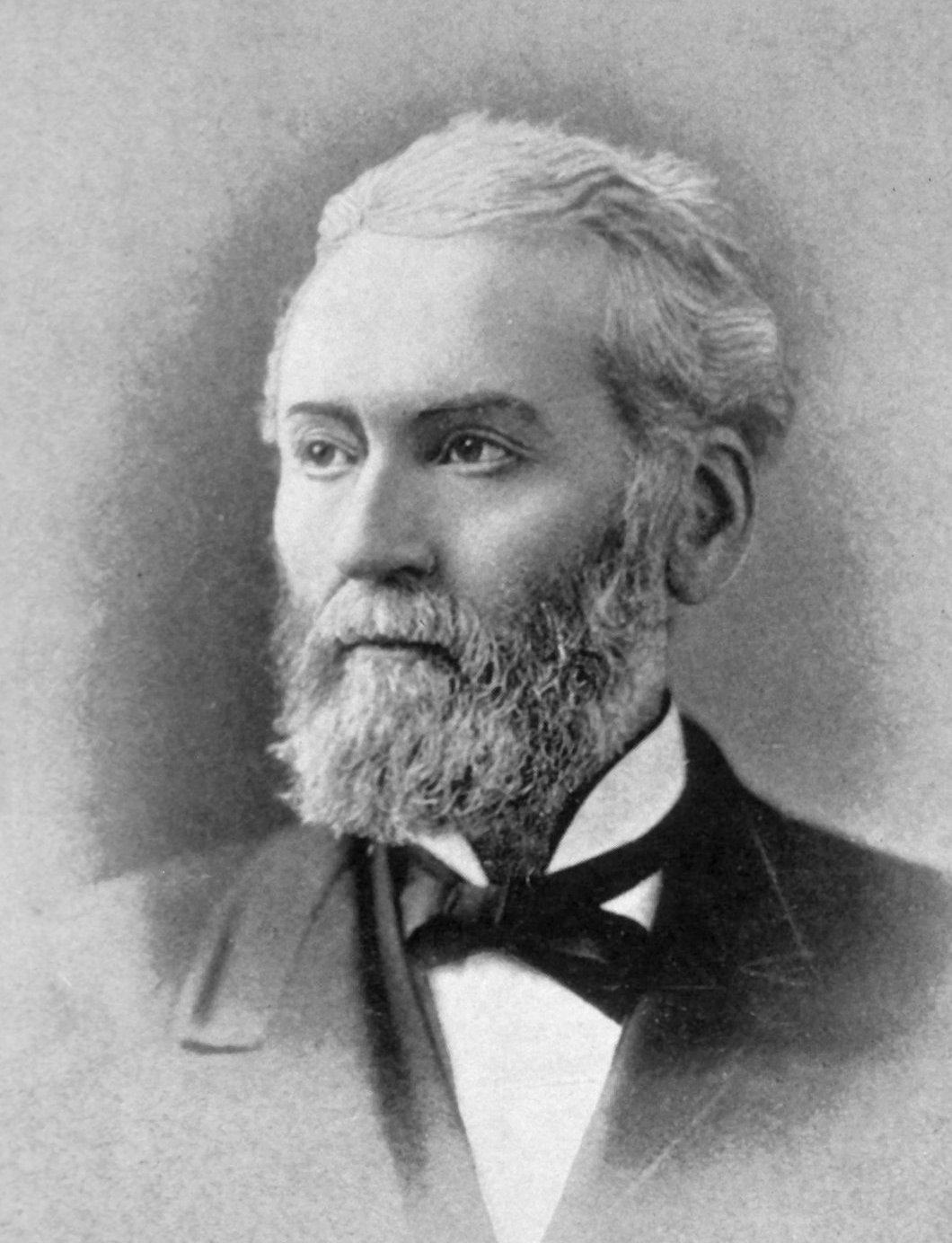

26th Mayor of Chicago
- In office 1871–1873
- Preceded by: Roswell B. Mason
- Succeeded by: (Lester L. Bond), Harvey Doolittle Colvin

Personal details
- Born: April 6, 1823 Saint John, New Brunswick, British North America
- Died: March 16, 1899 (aged 75) San Antonio, Texas, U.S.
- Resting place: Graceland Cemetery
- Party: Free Soil, Whig, Republican
- Spouse: Katherine "Kitty" Patrick (m. 1852)
- Children: 3
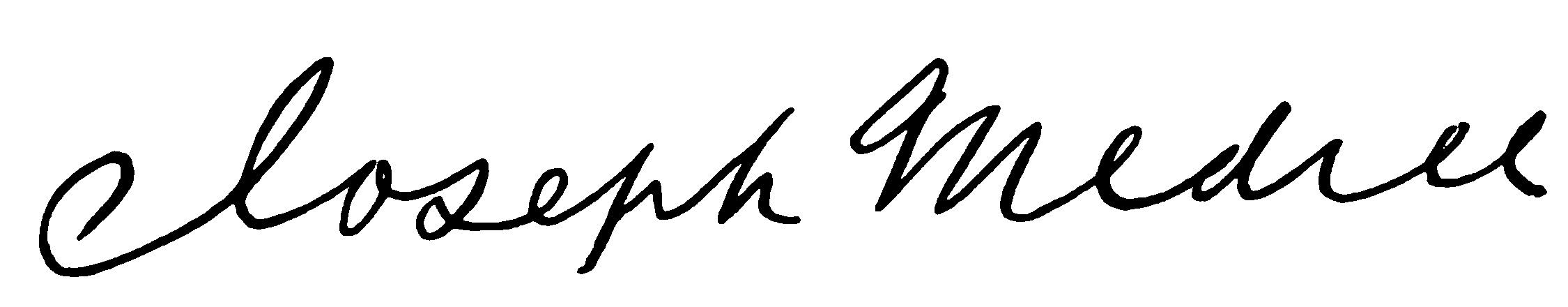
- Signature

Joseph Medill (April 6, 1823 – March 16, 1899) was a Canadian-American newspaper editor, publisher, and Republican Party politician. He was co-owner and managing editor of the Chicago Tribune, and he was Mayor of Chicago from after the Great Chicago Fire of 1871 until 1873.

== Early life ==
Joseph Medill was born April 6, 1823, in Saint John, New Brunswick, British North America, to Margaret and William Medill. His parents were Scots-Irish. In 1832, the family moved to Massillon, Ohio. He grew up on a farm and was taught English grammar, Latin, logic and philosophy from Reverend Hawkins, a clergyman of the Methodist Episcopal Church in Canton. He graduated from the Massillon Academy in 1843. He read law under Hiram Griswold and was admitted to the Ohio Bar in 1846.

== Early career ==
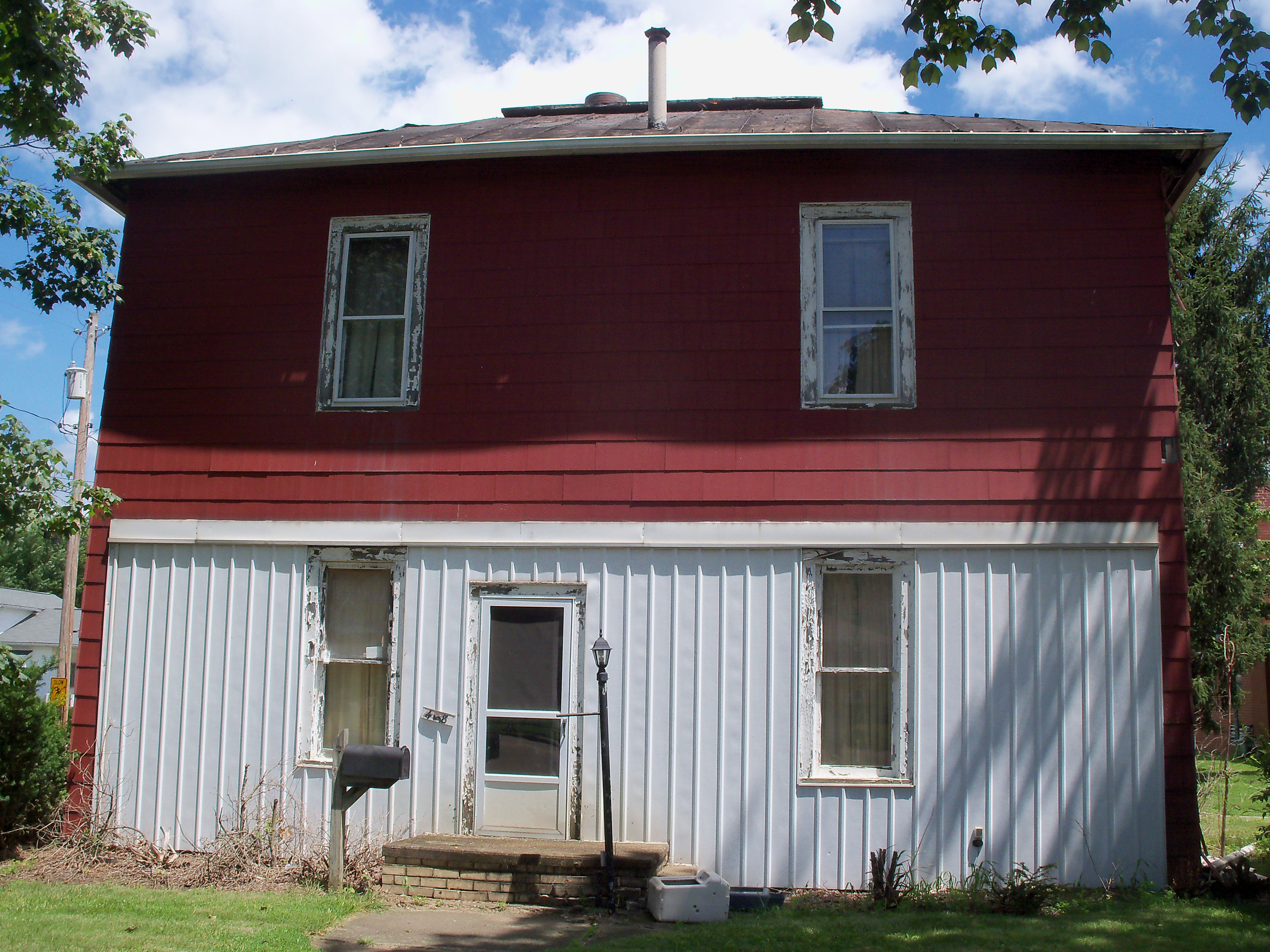
Medill taught at this school in Navarre, Ohio, in the 1840s.

After joining the bar, he started a law practice with George W. McIlvaine. They dissolved their practice after three years.

== Publishing career ==
In 1859 Medill purchased the Coshocton Democratic Whig then renamed the paper as the Democratic Whig. In 1853, Medill and Edwin Cowles started the Leader, a newspaper in Cleveland, Ohio. (It was later absorbed by The Plain Dealer.) In 1854, the Tribune's part-owner, Captain J. D. Webster, asked Medill to become the paper's managing editor. Medill was further encouraged to come to Chicago by Dr. Charles H. Ray of Galena, Illinois, and editor Horace Greeley of the New York Tribune.

In 1855, Medill sold his interest in the Leader to Cowles and bought the Tribune in partnership with Dr. Ray and Alfred Cowles (Edwin's brother).

Under Medill's management, the Tribune flourished, becoming one of the largest newspapers in Chicago. Medill served as its managing editor until 1864, when Horace White became editor-in-chief. At that time Medill left day-to-day operations of the Tribune for political activities.

But White clashed with Medill over the presidential election of 1872. So, in 1873 Medill bought additional equity from Cowles and from White, becoming majority owner. In 1874, he replaced White as editor-in-chief. Medill served as editor-in-chief until his death.

== Political activity ==
Medill was a leading Republican in Chicago. Under Medill, the Tribune became the leading Republican newspaper in Chicago. Medill was strongly anti-slavery, supporting both the Free-Soil cause and Abolitionism. Medill was a major supporter of Abraham Lincoln in the 1850s. Medill and the Tribune were instrumental in Lincoln's presidential nomination, and were equally supportive of the Union cause during the American Civil War. The Tribune's chief adversary through this period was the Chicago Times, which supported the Democrats.

Medill was among Chicago's Protestant elites (see, WASP). His rabid anti-Irish sentiment was published daily in The Chicago Tribune. He regularly dismissed the Irish as lazy and shiftless. “Who does not know that the most depraved, debased, worthless and irredeemable drunkards and sots which curse the community are Irish Catholics?” This came even as Irish laborers worked feverishly to complete Chicago's stately St. Patrick's church at Adams and Desplaines Streets in the mid-1850s.

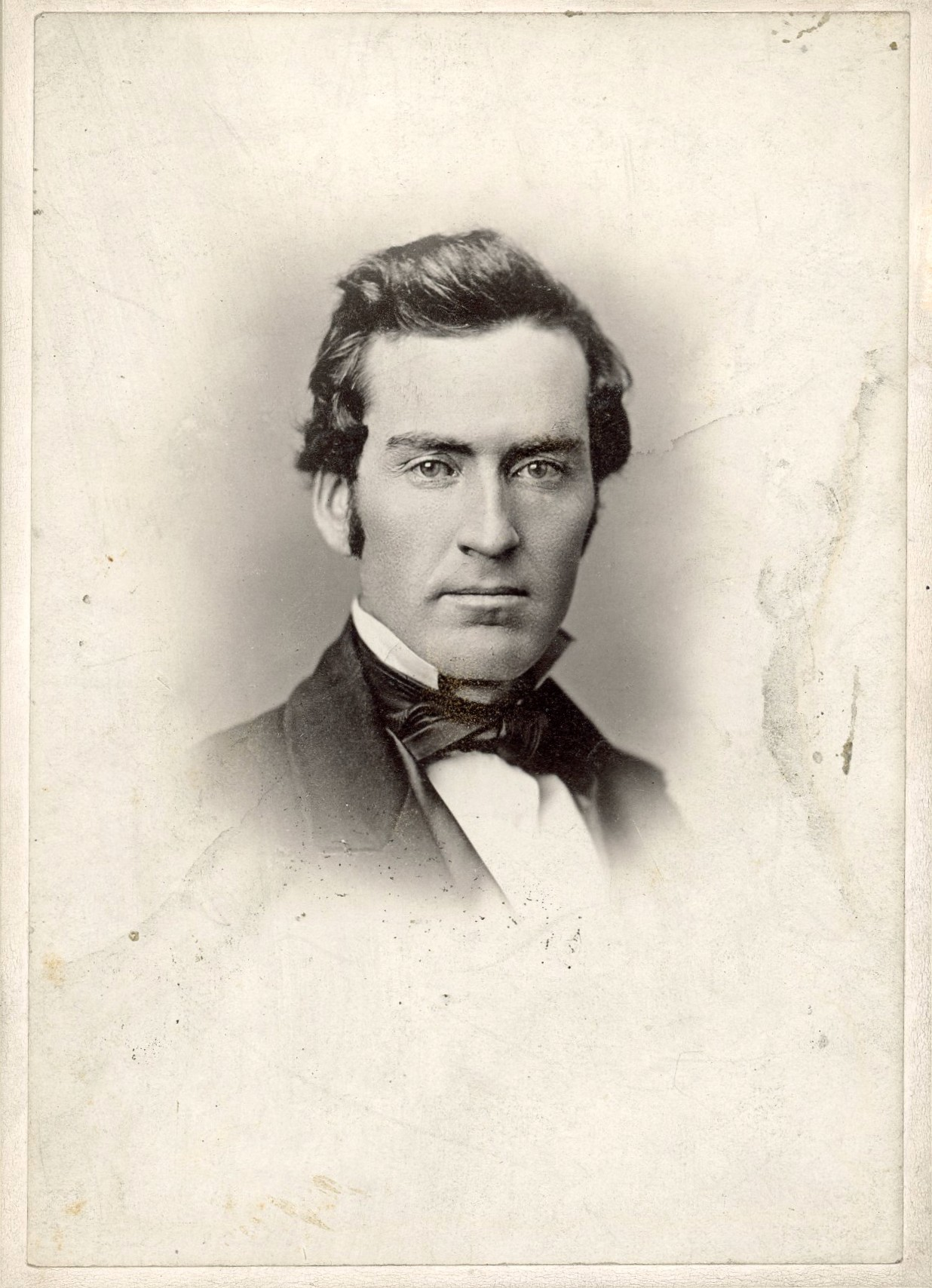
Joseph Medill daguerreotype, circa 1852

In 1864, Medill left the Tribune editorship for political activity, which occupied him for the next ten years. He was appointed by President Grant to the first Civil Service Commission. In 1870, he was elected as a delegate to the Illinois Constitutional convention.

Medill joined with Samuel Snowden Hayes and Rosell Hough (prominent Chicago Democrats) in order to oppose conditions of military draft laws during the American Civil War, feeling that the government was demanding too many troops to be drafted out of Cook County. On February 23, 1865, they met with President Lincoln. On February 27, they had a meeting with both Lincoln and Secretary of War Edwin Stanton. Stanton rejected their concerns. Lincoln castigated them, particularly chewing-out Medill. Lincoln argued that Chicagoans and Medill's newspaper had been most uncompromising in their opposition to the south's stance on slavery, and therefore should muster the men demanded of them to supply the Union with troops.

=== Mayoralty ===
In 1871, after the Great Chicago Fire, Medill was elected mayor of Chicago as the candidate of the emergency fusion "Union Fireproof" party, defeating Charles C. P. Holden, and served as mayor for two years.

Medill was sworn in as mayor on December 4, 1871.

As mayor, Medill gained more power for the mayor's office, created Chicago's first public library, enforced blue laws, and reformed the police and fire departments.

During his mayoralty, Medill worked successfully to have the Illinois General Assembly modify the city charter to increase mayoral authority. As mayor-elect, on December 4, 1871, he tapped Judge Murray F. Tuley to draft a "Mayor's Bill" to be submitted to the General Assembly in its next session. After successful lobbying by Medill and Tuley, the bill passed on March 9, 1872. It went into effect July 1, 1872, and provided the mayor with the new authority to,

- Serve as presiding officer of the Chicago Common Council (city council); to appoint all unelected city officials with the advice and consent of the Common Council
- Remove all unelected city officials, with only the requirement that they provide the City Council with reasons for such a removal
- Appoint the standing committees of the Common Council and serve as an ex officio member of those committees
- Veto any ordinance, including all or part of an appropriations ordinance, with a two-thirds vote of the Common Council required to override such as veto
- Exercise special police powers

In his first year as mayor, Medill received very little legislative resistance from the Chicago Common Council. While he vetoed what was an unprecedented eleven Common Council ordinances that year, most narrowly were involved with specific financial practices considered wasteful and none of the vetoes were overridden. He used his new powers to appoint the members of the newly constituted Chicago Board of Education and the commissioners of its constituted public library. His appointments were approved unanimously by the Common Council.

Medill sought funding for the recovery of Chicago. Medill had strongly lobbied on behalf of the city to receive state financial aid, taking advantage of his connections with state legislators in the state capitol of Springfield, Illinois. While, at the time, state law prohibited the direct appropriation of state funds to the city, Medill was able to get the legislature to pass a special act reimbursing the city for $2.9 million the city had expended on the state-owned Illinois and Michigan Canal. Medill also sought federal financial help. Medill took advantage of his connections in Washington, D.C., to seek such aid. In his third month in office, he wrote Vice President Schuyler Colfax to urge the passage of a tariff rebate that would help increase the supply of inexpensive material for the reconstruction of the city. Despite strong opposition from lumber interests, the legislation succeeded in passing. Medill also convinced President Grant to give a personal $1,000 contribution to aid the city's reconstruction. More than $5 million in gifts and loans were collected from people and cities across the world.

Taking Medill's lead, on February 12, 1872, the Common Council approved 26-6 an ordinance that prohibited the construction of wood frame buildings in city limits.

Medill was a strong Republican loyalist who supported President Grant for re-election in 1872. This caused a breach with Tribune editor, Horace White after White supported the breakaway Liberal Republicans, reformists who nominated Horace Greeley for president.

In his second year as mayor, tensions arose as he began to further utilize the new powers given to the mayor. At the first 1873 meeting of the Common Council, Medill announced that he would be using the power to select the chairmen of members of the council committees. He appointed his loyalists to lead most important committees, while aldermen of wards consisting of immigrant populations received lesser consideration for appointments. In the first three months of 1873 alone, Medill practiced his veto power on five Common Council ordinances.

Medill and his police superintendent Elmer Washburn cracked down on gambling.

Medill met not only resistance from a Common Council divided over his exercise of power and aspects of his agenda, but also resistance from citizens. Anton C. Hesing derided him as "Joseph I, Dictator".

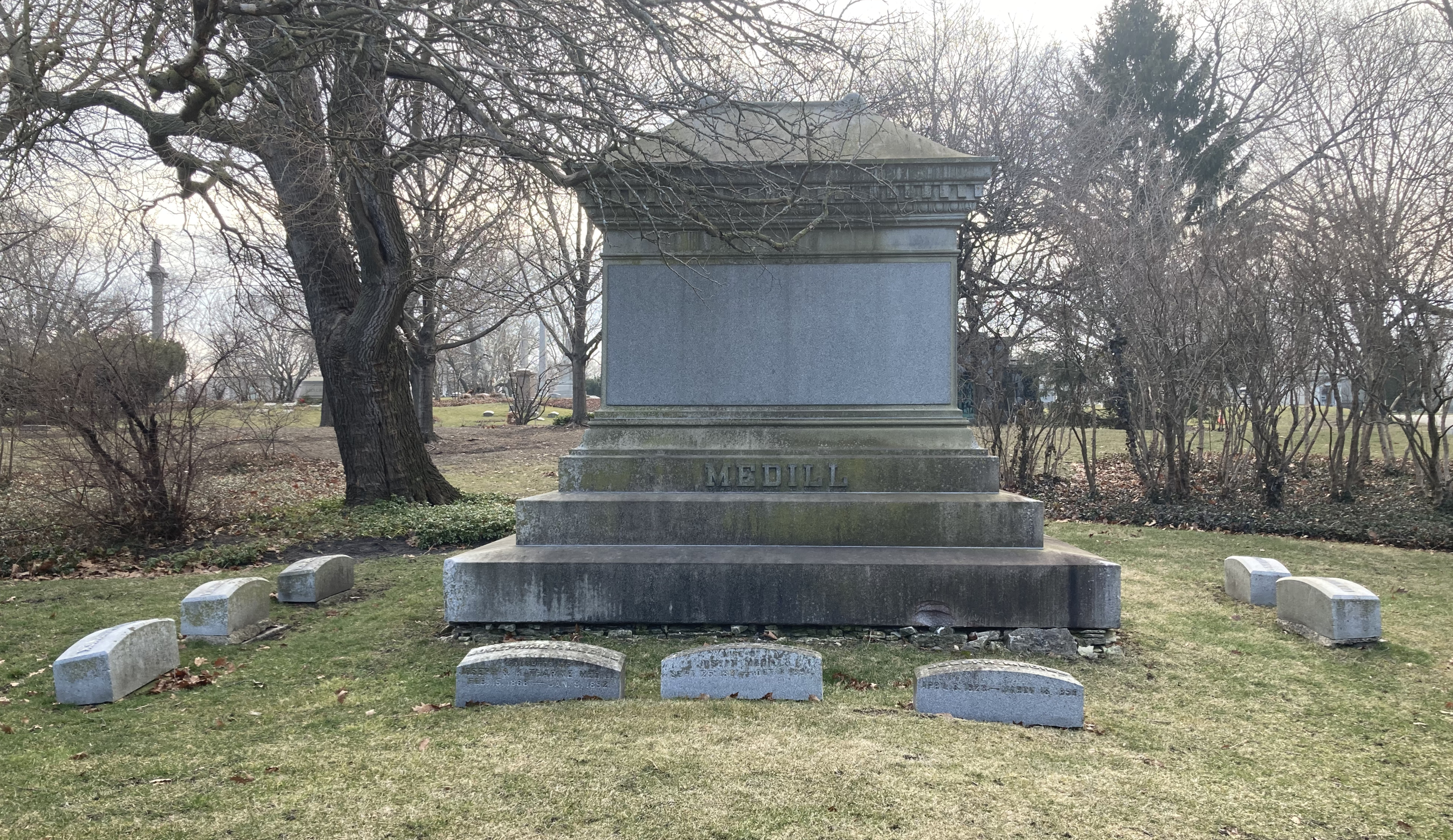
Medill's grave at Graceland Cemetery

The stress of the job of mayor impaired Medill's health. In August 1873, he appointed Lester L. Bond as Acting Mayor for the remaining 3½ months of his term, and went to Europe on a convalescent tour.

== Personal life ==
Medill married Katherine "Kitty" Patrick on September 2, 1852, and they had three daughters, Katherine, Elinor and Josephine. Medill died on March 16, 1899, at the age of 75 in San Antonio, Texas. He was buried at Graceland Cemetery in Chicago.

== Legacy and honors ==
During World War II, the Liberty ship SS Joseph M. Medill was built in Panama City, and named in his honor.

The Medill School of Journalism, Media, and Integrated Marketing Communications at Northwestern University is also named in his honor.

== Relations ==
Medill Chicago family tree

Joseph Medill (1823–1899)	Katherine Patrick
Robert Wilson Patterson (1850–1910)	Elinor Medill (1855–1933)	Katherine van Etta Medill (1853–1932)	Robert Sanderson McCormick (1849–1919)
Joseph Medill Patterson (1879–1946)	Eleanor Josephine Medill Patterson (1884–1948)	Ruth Hanna (1880–1944)	Joseph Medill McCormick (1877–1925)	Robert Rutherford McCormick (1880–1955)
Alicia Patterson (1906–1963)	Harry Frank Guggenheim (1890–1971)	Jay Frederick Reeve (1893–1956)	Josephine Medill Patterson (1913–1996)	Ivan Le Lorraine Albright (1897–1983)	James Joseph Patterson (1923–1992)
Madeleine Jana Korbel (1937–2022)	Joseph Medill Patterson Reeve, later Albright (born 1937)	Alice Reeve, later Albright (1940–2016)	Michael J. Arlen (born 1930)

Notes:

The family tree omits Medill's third daughter, Josephine, who died in 1892.
