= Illinois Central Railroad Co. v. Illinois =

Illinois Central Railroad v. Illinois
- Supreme Court of the United States

Argued October 12–14, 1892 Decided December 5, 1892
- Full case name: Illinois Central Railroad Company v. Illinois
- Citations: 146 U.S. 387 (more) 13 S.Ct. 110; 36 L. Ed. 1018; 1892 U.S. LEXIS 2208

Holding
- Navigable waters are of special interest to the public and are held in trust by the state.

Court membership
- Chief Justice Melville Fuller Associate Justices Stephen J. Field · John M. Harlan; Horace Gray · Samuel Blatchford; Lucius Q. C. Lamar II · David J. Brewer; Henry B. Brown · George Shiras Jr.

Case opinions
- Majority: Field, joined by Harlan, Lamar, Brewer
- Dissent: Shiras, joined by Brown, Gray
- Fuller and Blatchford took no part in the consideration or decision of the case.

The Supreme Court decision in Illinois Central Railroad v. Illinois, 146 U.S. 387 (1892), reaffirmed that each state in its sovereign capacity holds title to all submerged lands within its borders and holds these lands in public trust. This is a foundational case for the public trust doctrine. The Supreme Court held a four to three split decision that the State of Illinois did not possess the authority to grant fee title to submerged lands where doing so would preclude exercise of the public right to commercial navigation and fishing in navigable waters.

== Background ==
In the mid-19th century, Chicago was growing rapidly and was becoming increasingly interested in creating an outer harbor at the junction of Lake Michigan and the Chicago River because local currents often resulted in either the formation of sandbars or areas of erosion, increasing congestion and complicating navigation. Then, in 1851, the Illinois Central Railroad Company made an offer to the City of Chicago that in exchange for allowing tracks to be laid along the lake front, the railroad company would pay for and build a breakwater to protect the harbor. Illinois then officially granted 3 million acres (12,000 km^{2}) of shoreline along Lake Michigan to create a north–south railroad under the state charter titled "An Act to Incorporate the Illinois Central Rail Road Company". This charter gave Illinois Central the authority to "enter upon and take possession of, and use all and singular any lands, streams and materials of every kind." To further confirm their rights to this area, the railroad lobbied the state, and in 1869, the State of Illinois passed the Lake Front Act, granting Illinois Central "appropriation, occupancy, use and control" of a large portion of the harbor. The legislature's goal in passing the act was to bring a new train depot, an outer harbor and better parks to the residents of Chicago. The portion of land stretched from present-day West Randolph Street south to Twelfth Street, and from South Michigan Avenue east into Lake Michigan. However, due to political controversy and poor public opinion of the railroad company, the legislature repealed the Lake Front Act in 1873. Both before and after the repeal, Illinois Central continued to construct tracks, piers and other facilities along the lake front. This construction also included filling in several hundred feet into Lake Michigan to provide land for these new facilities.

On March 1, 1883, the Illinois Attorney General filed suit against Illinois Central in order to stop construction on the land known as Lake Park.

=== Procedural history ===
In 1883, Illinois filed suit in state court against the Illinois Central Railroad Company, asking the court to determine who possessed title to submerged lands under Lake Michigan adjacent to the Chicago shoreline. Illinois also sought a court order to remove structures the railroad company had constructed over the lakebed, as well as an injunction against Illinois Central continuing this construction. Upon motion, the case was removed to the federal Circuit Court for the Northern District of Illinois. Justice Harlan, then a circuit-court judge, ruled that the state held title to the submerged lands, and therefore had the right to revoke the license granted to Illinois Central in the Act, which Illinois Central had contested. This decision also established that the City of Chicago held title to the land of Lake Park (present day Millennium Park). Illinois Central appealed to the Supreme Court. Chief Justice Melville Fuller and Associate Justice Samuel Blatchford recused themselves: Fuller had previously represented Illinois Central as a private attorney, while Blatchford held stock in the company.

=== Parties ===
The petitioners were Illinois Central Railroad Company, a corporation created by act of the Illinois State legislature and the city of Chicago, which was added as a party at trial because of its interest in the case. The respondent was the state of Illinois.

=== Issues ===
1. Whether the state of Illinois possessed the authority to grant title to its lands submerged by navigable waters.
2. Whether Illinois Central Railroad Company acquired riparian rights to the lake bed immediately adjacent to the lakefront property to which it possessed title.

=== Arguments ===
==== Illinois Central’s arguments ====
Illinois Central Railroad asserted three arguments in support of their claim on a portion of the lakebed under Lake Michigan. First, Illinois Central argued it had been granted by the state and by city ordinance a 200-foot (61 m) wide corridor into the lake to construct a raised railway track, pier and warehouses. Second, Illinois Central argued that they had acquired riparian rights by virtue of their ownership of lands surrounding the lake. Third, the railroad company argued they had received title to a bounded parcel of submerged lakebed from the State of Illinois in 1869.

==== State of Illinois’s argument ====
In seeking to enjoin the railroad, the state claimed "title to the bed of Lake Michigan, and exclusive right to develop and improve the harbor of Chicago by the construction of docks, wharves, piers, and other improvements…."

== Decision ==
=== Majority Opinion of the Court ===
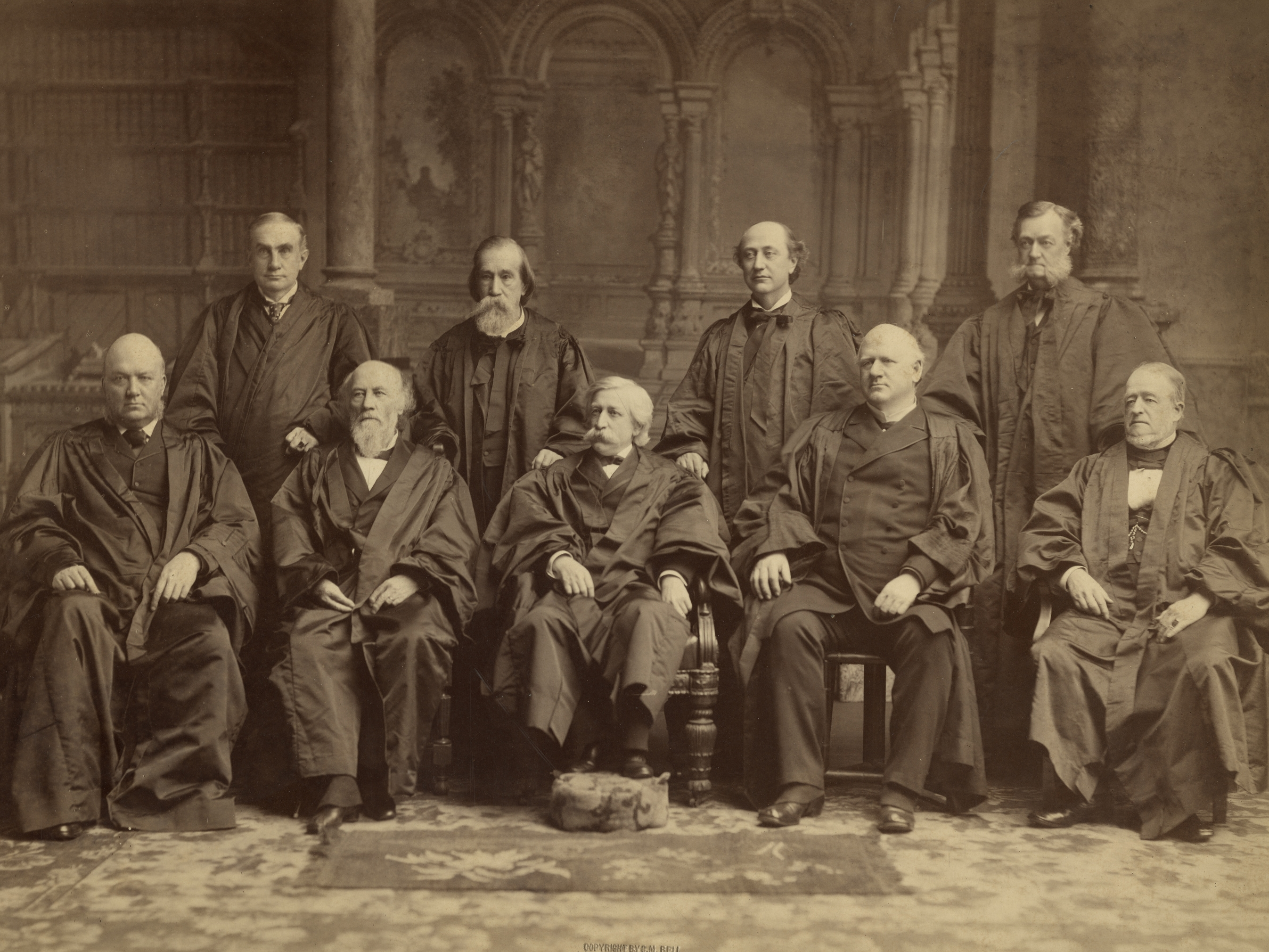
The Fuller Court in 1892.

Writing for the majority, Justice Field affirmed the lower court's holding that the state held title to the lakebed. Field found that Illinois lacked the authority to grant title to submerged lands held in the public trust with two exceptions – for grants not impairing the public interest and grants that actually improved the public trust. But neither exception was found to apply in this case and therefore the railroad did not possess title.

Justice Field expressed the doctrine of public trust as follows:

"It is the settled law of this country that the ownership of and dominion and sovereignty over lands covered by tide waters, within the limits of the several states, belong to the respective states within which they are found, with the consequent right to use or dispose of any portion thereof, when that can be done without substantial impairment of the interest of the public in the waters, and subject always to the paramount right of congress to control their navigation so far as may be necessary for the regulation of commerce with foreign nations and among the states"

Justice Field determined that the public trust doctrine applies to the Great Lakes, despite the fact that they are not subject to the ebb and flow of the tides. Initially, the United States adopted English Common law which limited the definition of navigable waters to those that were subject to the ebb and flow of the tides. In the United States the tidal requirement was removed because many rivers can be navigated for great distances by large commercial vessels. Great Lakes, while not subject to the tides, are the conduit of a great deal of transnational and interstate commerce, and it was this value the common law sought to protect in the public trust doctrine. The public trust doctrine limits private property rights to lands submerged by navigable waters. The Great Lakes are owned in common to be preserved for the common good, and no private encroachment is allowed.

Justice Field argued that the 1869 grant Illinois made to Illinois Central Railroad was merely a grant of the right to lay track, not a transfer of title to a portion of the lakebed. The grant was expressly limited to this purpose and it particularly limited the transfer of a right of way across the lake so as not to interrupt the navigation of streams.

Justice Field agreed with Illinois Central that title to land bordering navigable waters carries with it the right to access these waters and to develop a pier for personal or public use. However, this right extends only to the "navigable point" of the water. Since no evidence had been presented indicating that the railroad's pier and docks extended that far, Justice Field remanded this particular issue back to the lower court.

The 1869 act establishing the Illinois Central Railroad Company, granted the company title to a section of the submerged lakebed of Lake Michigan. The state legislature later repealed this piece of legislation. Justice Field posed the question whether the legislature was authorized to transfer title to the submerged lake bed in the first place. It is up to courts to determine on a case-by-case basis whether a state legislature's transfer of rights to submerged lands sufficiently protects the public interest.

In this case, Illinois Central was granted unrestricted rights to an enormous, 1,000-acre (4.0 km^{2}) section of submerged land, which occupied the entire aquatic area bordering the Chicago harbor. Justice Field found the state can never permanently transfer authority over these submerged lands, but only grant revocable permissions to them. Therefore, the Illinois state legislature's original grant had no effect on the state of Illinois's ultimate authority over the submerged land.

=== Justice Shiras' Dissenting Opinion ===
Justice Shiras agreed that ownership of state lands extends to those lands submerged under its navigable waters; however, Shiras argued that the grant of the submerged lands by the state legislature functioned like any land transfer contract and effectively transferred title to Illinois Central. Shiras pointed out that the act granting the submerged lands expressly denied Illinois Central the rights to resell or transfer the lands or to impair the public right to navigation. Shiras makes it clear that this dissenting opinion does not contradict the point that states cannot transfer control of the public's rights to navigable waters, however, these rights are only violated once Illinois Central acts to obstruct them. To otherwise empower the legislature to revoke legislative acts granting property rights would offend "the right of the citizens to the free enjoyment of their property legally acquired."

== Importance ==
Though Illinois Central is frequently cited as the source for American public trust law, it was several decades before, in Martin v. Waddell’s Lessee, that the Supreme Court ratified the public trust doctrine. Still, Illinois Central has been referred to as "the Lodestar in American Public Trust Law". As of 2010, the courts of 35 states had cited Illinois Central in their articulation of the public trust doctrine.

== See also ==
- Public trust doctrine
- List of United States Supreme Court cases, volume 146
