= Arthur Dixon =

Arthur Dixon may refer to:

- Arthur Dixon (Chicago alderman) (1837–1917)
- Arthur Dixon Elementary School, a public elementary school in Chicago, Illinois
- Arthur J. Dixon (1919–2007), member of the Legislative Assembly of Alberta
- Arthur A. Dixon (1872–1959), English artist and illustrator
- Arthur Lee Dixon (1867–1955), British mathematician and academic
- Arthur Stansfield Dixon (1856–1929), English metal worker and architect
- J. Arthur Dixon (1897–1958), British founder of the eponymous postcard and greetings card company
- Arthur Dixon, master of the SS Magdapur, mined and sunk in 1939 off Thorpeness, Suffolk
- Arthur Dixon, community activist and candidate in the 2026 US House of Representatives election for California district 34

== Footballers ==
- Arthur Dixon (footballer, born 1892) (1892–1965), English footballer who played for Rangers FC
- Arthur Dixon (footballer, born 1867) (1867–1933), English footballer who played for Aston Villa FC
- Arthur Dixon (footballer, born 1879) (1879–1946), English footballer who played for Burnley FC
- Arthur Dixon (footballer, born 1887) (1887–1964), English footballer who played for Plymouth Argyle FC
- Arthur Dixon (footballer, born 1921) (1921–2006), English footballer for Northampton Town and Leicester City
