= Thomas Dyer =

American politician

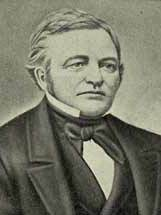

18th Mayor of Chicago
- In office March 11, 1856 – March 10, 1857
- Preceded by: Levi Boone
- Succeeded by: John Wentworth

Personal details
- Born: January 13, 1805 Canton, Connecticut, U.S.
- Died: June 6, 1862 (aged 57) Middletown, Connecticut, U.S.
- Resting place: Graceland Cemetery
- Party: Democratic

Thomas Dyer (January 13, 1805 – June 6, 1862) served as mayor of Chicago, Illinois (1856–1857) for the Democratic Party. He also served as the founding president of the Chicago Board of Trade.

== Biography ==
Thomas Dyer was born in Canton, Connecticut on January 13, 1805.

He was a meat-packing partner of former mayor John Putnam Chapin, who was one of Chicago's first meat packers. Chapin built a slaughterhouse on the South Branch of the Chicago River in 1844.

Running as a "pro-Nebraska" Democrat (aligned with Stephen A. Douglas, who publicly backed his candidacy), Dyer won the contentious 1856 Chicago mayoral election, defeating former mayor Francis Cornwall Sherman (who ran as an anti-Nebraska candidate).

He died in Middletown, Connecticut on June 6, 1862, and was buried at Graceland Cemetery in Chicago.
