= Hamline =

Hamline may refer to:

- Hamline University, in Saint Paul, Minnesota, United States
- Leonidas Lent Hamline (1797–1865), American bishop and lawyer after whom the university is named
- John H. Hamline (1856–1904), American lawyer
