= Bill Francis (baseball) =

- Third baseman / Manager
- Born: February 28, 1879; Philadelphia, Pennsylvania, U.S.
- Died: January 26, 1942 (aged 62); Chicago, Illinois, U.S.
- Batted: Right Threw: Right

debut
- 1906, for the Philadelphia Giants

Last appearance
- 1925, for the Chicago American Giants
- Stats at Baseball Reference

Teams
- Philadelphia Giants (1906–1910); Matanzas (1908–1909); New York Lincoln Giants (1911–1913); Club Fé (1912–1913); Chicago American Giants (1914–1919, 1925); Breakers Hotel (1915–1916); Detroit Stars (1919); Hilldale Club (1920–1922); Atlantic City Bacharach Giants (1923); Cleveland Browns (1924)

William Henry Francis (February 28, 1879 – January 26, 1942) was an American Negro leagues third baseman for a few years before the founding of the first Negro National League, and in its first few seasons.

He was playing for the Philadelphia Giants at the age of 27 years in 1906, and continued with that team until 1910, playing Winter Ball for the Matanzas team in Cuba in 1908 and 1909.

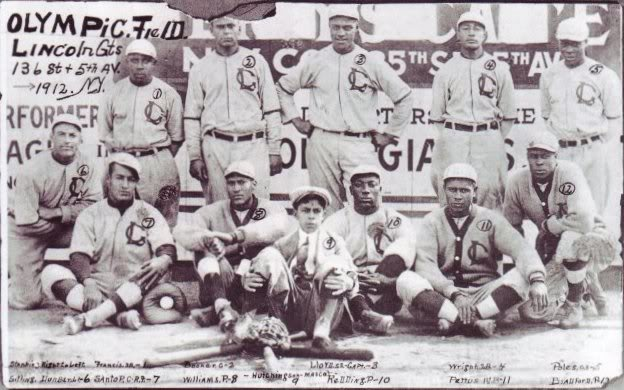
The 1912 Lincoln Giants

Francis went to the Leland Giants in 1911 and stayed there for three seasons. He went back to Cuba, playing for Club Fé in 1912-1913.

During a 1914 four-game series against the Chicago Giants, sportswriter Cary B. Lewis said of Francis, "Although short, Francis runs like a deer." Sources show Lewis stood 5 foot, 5 inches tall.

In 1918, 39 year-old Francis registered for the WWI Draft. He lists his current occupation as "Laborer" for the Illinois Plating Company on Randolph Street in Chicago, Illinois. He lists his nearest relative as Mamie Francis.

When Francis left Chicago in 1919, he played the rest of the season for the Detroit Stars.

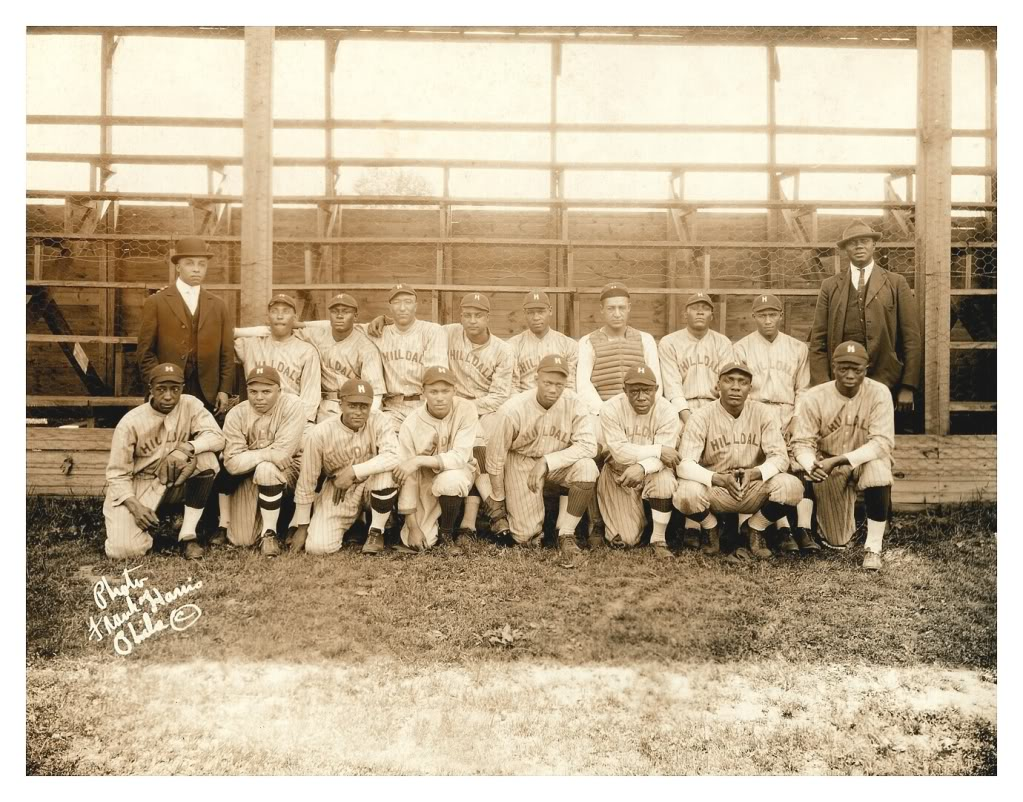
The Hilldale Club in 1921

At the forming of the first Negro National League, the 41-year-old Francis found himself on the Hilldale Club where he would also manage the team.

Francis died in Chicago, Illinois at the age of 62. He is buried at Lincoln Cemetery in Blue Island, Illinois.
