= 1855 Chicago mayoral election =

Chicago mayoral election, 1855
- March 8, 1855
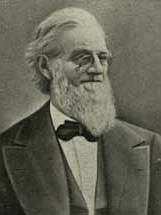

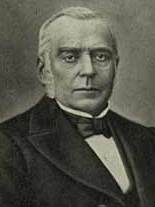
Candidate	Levi Boone	Isaac Lawrence Milliken
Party	Know Nothing	Democratic
Popular vote	3,185	2,839
Percentage	52.87%	47.13%
Mayor before election
Isaac Lawrence Milliken
Democratic
Elected mayor
Levi Boone
Know Nothing

In the 1855 Chicago mayoral election, Know Nothing candidate Levi Boone defeated Democratic incumbent Isaac Lawrence Milliken by a 5.75% margin.

The election was held on March 8.

== Campaigning ==
The mayoral election was unusual in that no candidate had entered the race until five days before the day of the election.

The campaign for the municipal elections of 1855 began very early in the year, before any candidates had emerged for the mayoral race. Religious, ethnic, and political leaders debated for weeks on many issues. The race quickly took a nativist tone. Topics included the role of foreigners on night police duty, controversy regarding the city's school fund, bar fights. Debate also arose from the split amongst Democrats around the Kansas–Nebraska Act, which would take an even more prominent role in the following year's election. One of the greatest controversies was about the state legislature's decision to allow a referendum for that June regarding possible prohibition of alcoholic beverages.

Boone received support from a coalition of Know-Nothing and pro-temperance voters. As was typical of his party, Boone's platform was anti-immigrant, anti-alcohol, and anti-catholic. Boone had run for mayor once before, having been an unsuccessful candidate in the 1850 mayoral election.

Boone benefitted from an article published by the Chicago Tribune that blamed Milliken for an Irish beer riot and stoked fears by warning, "Every vote given for Milliken is a vote given for whisky, Jesuitism, for Irish rule, for crime and pauperism, and for the ruin of Chicago."

The management of 24 German saloons announced that their establishments would be closed on the day of the election. This was a largely unprecedented move, and received praise from both by the press and from religious leaders.

There were allegations that Irish and German voters from Bridgeport, which was then outside the city limits, were brought in to vote illegally for Milliken.

== Results ==
1855 Chicago mayoral election
Party	Candidate	Votes	%
Know Nothing	Levi Boone	3,185	52.87
Democratic	Isaac Lawrence Milliken (incumbent)	2,839	47.13
Turnout		6,024	

== Aftermath ==
Boone's victory was also a victory for the burgeoning Know Nothing party, which had been established the previous year.

Despite nearly half of Chicagoans being of foreign origin, Boone had won on a nativist platform.

Privately, Illinois politician (and future United States President) Abraham Lincoln was vehemently opposed to the platform upon which Boone had run; however, he did not publicly denounce it out of concern that doing so would alienate the support he needed in order to build a successful anti-slavery coalition in Illinois and to win the Illinois' United States Senate election three years later.

In his term as mayor, Boone cracked down on immigrants. He barred them from working for the municipal government. He also enforced liquor policies which were perceived to target German immigrants, which led to the Lager Beer Riot.
