= Dixon Elementary School =

Dixon Elementary School may refer to:

United States

- Arthur Dixon Elementary School in Chicago, a part of Chicago Public Schools
- Dixon Elementary School in Irvington, Alabama, a part of the Mobile County Public School System
- Dixon Elementary School in Dixon, Kentucky, a part of Webster County School District
- Dixon Elementary School in Holly Ridge, North Carolina, a part of Onslow County Schools
- Dixon Elementary School in Brookfield, Wisconsin, a part of Elmbrook Schools

Canada

- Alfred B. Dixon Elementary School, in Richmond, British Columbia, a part of the Richmond School District
