= 1st ward, Chicago =

Ward in Chicago

1st Ward - Chicago
- Ward
- Ward 1
- Current Chicago ward map, with 1st ward highlighted in red
- Country: United States
- State: Illinois
- County: Cook
- City: Chicago
- Established: 1837
- Communities: list

Government
  - Type: Ward
  - Body: Chicago City Council
  - Alderperson: Daniel La Spata (Democratic Party)

The 1st Ward is one of the 50 aldermanic wards with representation in the City Council of Chicago, Illinois.

== History ==
Ward (outlined in red) on an 1895 ward map

Ward (outlined in red) on a 1929 ward map

Boundaries of the ward used for the 2015 and 2019 aldermanic elections

By the mid-1890s, the ward's partisan lean had firmly become Democratic. The last Republican to represent the ward on the Chicago City Council was Francis P. Gleason, who left office in 1897.

In the 1940s, the ward was referred to as being the "wealthiest ward in the world".

== Past alders ==
The current alderperson for the 1st ward is Daniel La Spata.

=== Before 1923 ===
Before 1923, wards were represented by two aldermen.

Aldermen					# Council	Aldermen				
Alderman	Term in office	Party	Notes	Cite	# Council	Alderman	Term in office	Party	Notes	Cite
J.C. Goodhue	1837–1838				1st	Hiram Pearson	1837–1838			
E.A. Haddock	1838–1839				2nd	Eli B. Williams	1838–1839			
James A. Smith	1839–1840				3rd	Oliver H. Thompson	1839–1840			
Orsemus Morrison	1840–1841				4th	Julius Wadsworth	1840–1841			
John Davlin	1841–1842				5th	Charles Follansbee	1841–1842			
John Calhoun	1842–1843				6th	Norman B. Judd	1842–1843			
Cyrenus Beers	1843–1844				7th	Hugh T. Dickey	1843–1844			
John P. Chapin	1844–1845	Whig			8th	Asher Rossiter	1844–1845			
Thomas Church	1845–1846				9th	J. Young Scammon	1845–1846	Whig		
Levi Boone	1846–1847		Redistricted to 2nd ward in 1847		10th	George Manierre	1846–1847	Democratic		
James Hutchinson Woodworth	1847–1848		Previously served in 2nd ward		11th	Peter L. Updike	1847–1849			
Edward Manierre	1848–1849		Previously served in 2nd ward		12th	Peter L. Updike	1847–1849			
James Carney	1849–1851		Previously served in 2nd ward		13th	R.C. Bristol	1849			
James Carney	1849–1851		Previously served in 2nd ward		13th	Peter Page	1849–1852		Previously served in 2nd ward	
James Carney	1849–1851		Previously served in 2nd ward		14th	Peter Page	1849–1852		Previously served in 2nd ward	
John Sears Jr.	1851–1853				15th	Peter Page	1849–1852		Previously served in 2nd ward	
John Sears Jr.	1851–1853				16th	Eli B. Williams	1852–1855			
A.D. Taylor	1853–1855				17th	Eli B. Williams	1852–1855			
A.D. Taylor	1853–1855				18th	Eli B. Williams	1852–1855			
Sylvester Sexton	1855–1857				19th	James Long	1855–1860			
Sylvester Sexton	1855–1857				20th	James Long	1855–1860			
William Bross	1857–1859	Republican			21st	James Long	1855–1860			
William Bross	1857–1859	Republican			22nd	James Long	1855–1860			
J.K. Botsford	1859–1863				23rd	James Long	1855–1860			
J.K. Botsford	1859–1863				24th	William Colby	1860–1862		Previously served in 4th ward	
J.K. Botsford	1859–1863				25th	William Colby	1860–1862		Previously served in 4th ward	
J.K. Botsford	1859–1863				26th	John T. Edwards	1862–1863		Redistricted to 4th ward in 1863	
James Hahn	1863–1864		Redistricted from 3rd ward; later elected alderman again in 1867 in 3rd ward		27th	Andrew Schall	1863–1864		Redistricted from 4th ward	
George W. Gage	1864–1866	Republican			28th	Charles D. Peacock Sr.	1864–1865			
George W. Gage	1864–1866	Republican			29th	Joshua C. Knickerbocker	1865–1869			
William Cox	1866–1870				30th	Joshua C. Knickerbocker	1865–1869			
William Cox	1866–1870				31st	Joshua C. Knickerbocker	1865–1869			
William Cox	1866–1870				32nd	Joshua C. Knickerbocker	1865–1869			
William Cox	1866–1870				33rd	Joshua C. Knickerbocker	1865–1869			
William Cox	1866–1870				34th	Richard Sommers	1869–1871			
Joshua C. Knickerbocker	1870–1872				35th	Richard Sommers	1869–1871			
Joshua C. Knickerbocker	1870–1872				36th	Chauncey T. Bowen	1871–1873			
William H. Richardson	1872–1876				37th	Chauncey T. Bowen	1871–1873			
William H. Richardson	1872–1876				38th	Thomas Foley	1873–1876			
William H. Richardson	1872–1876				39th	Thomas Foley	1873–1876			
Daniel Kimball Pearsons	1876–1879				40th	John T. McAuley	1876–1878			
Daniel Kimball Pearsons	1876–1879				41st	John T. McAuley	1876–1878			
Daniel Kimball Pearsons	1876–1879				42nd	Murray F. Tuley	1878–1879			
Daniel Kimball Pearsons	1876–1879				42nd	Swayne Wickersham	1879–1884	Democratic		
Arthur Dixon	1879–1891	Republican	Previously served in 2nd ward		43rd	Swayne Wickersham	1879–1884	Democratic		
Arthur Dixon	1879–1891	Republican	Previously served in 2nd ward		44th	Swayne Wickersham	1879–1884	Democratic		
Arthur Dixon	1879–1891	Republican	Previously served in 2nd ward		45th	Swayne Wickersham	1879–1884	Democratic		
Arthur Dixon	1879–1891	Republican	Previously served in 2nd ward		46th	Swayne Wickersham	1879–1884	Democratic		
Arthur Dixon	1879–1891	Republican	Previously served in 2nd ward		47th	Swayne Wickersham	1879–1884	Democratic		
Arthur Dixon	1879–1891	Republican	Previously served in 2nd ward		48th	William P. Whelan	1884–1890	Democratic		
Arthur Dixon	1879–1891	Republican	Previously served in 2nd ward		49th	William P. Whelan	1884–1890	Democratic		
Arthur Dixon	1879–1891	Republican	Previously served in 2nd ward		50th	William P. Whelan	1884–1890	Democratic		
Arthur Dixon	1879–1891	Republican	Previously served in 2nd ward		51st	William P. Whelan	1884–1890	Democratic		
Arthur Dixon	1879–1891	Republican	Previously served in 2nd ward		52nd	William P. Whelan	1884–1890	Democratic		
Arthur Dixon	1879–1891	Republican	Previously served in 2nd ward		53rd	William P. Whelan	1884–1890	Democratic		
Arthur Dixon	1879–1891	Republican	Previously served in 2nd ward		54th	Nicholas A. Cremer	1890–1892			
John R. Morris	1891–1893				55th	Nicholas A. Cremer	1890–1892			
John R. Morris	1891–1893				56th	John Coughlin	1892–1938	Democratic	Continued as 1st ward alderman after 1923 switch to single-member constituencies, later died in office	
Louis I. Epstean	1893–1895				57th	John Coughlin	1892–1938	Democratic	Continued as 1st ward alderman after 1923 switch to single-member constituencies, later died in office	
Louis I. Epstean	1893–1895				58th	John Coughlin	1892–1938	Democratic	Continued as 1st ward alderman after 1923 switch to single-member constituencies, later died in office	
Francis P. Gleason	1895–1897	Republican			59th	John Coughlin	1892–1938	Democratic	Continued as 1st ward alderman after 1923 switch to single-member constituencies, later died in office	
Francis P. Gleason	1895–1897	Republican			60th	John Coughlin	1892–1938	Democratic	Continued as 1st ward alderman after 1923 switch to single-member constituencies, later died in office	
Michael Kenna	1897–1923	Democratic	later represented ward again (1939–1943)		61st	John Coughlin	1892–1938	Democratic	Continued as 1st ward alderman after 1923 switch to single-member constituencies, later died in office	
Michael Kenna	1897–1923	Democratic	later represented ward again (1939–1943)		62nd	John Coughlin	1892–1938	Democratic	Continued as 1st ward alderman after 1923 switch to single-member constituencies, later died in office	
Michael Kenna	1897–1923	Democratic	later represented ward again (1939–1943)		63rd	John Coughlin	1892–1938	Democratic	Continued as 1st ward alderman after 1923 switch to single-member constituencies, later died in office	
Michael Kenna	1897–1923	Democratic	later represented ward again (1939–1943)		64th	John Coughlin	1892–1938	Democratic	Continued as 1st ward alderman after 1923 switch to single-member constituencies, later died in office	
Michael Kenna	1897–1923	Democratic	later represented ward again (1939–1943)		65th	John Coughlin	1892–1938	Democratic	Continued as 1st ward alderman after 1923 switch to single-member constituencies, later died in office	
Michael Kenna	1897–1923	Democratic	later represented ward again (1939–1943)		66th	John Coughlin	1892–1938	Democratic	Continued as 1st ward alderman after 1923 switch to single-member constituencies, later died in office	
Michael Kenna	1897–1923	Democratic	later represented ward again (1939–1943)		67th	John Coughlin	1892–1938	Democratic	Continued as 1st ward alderman after 1923 switch to single-member constituencies, later died in office	
Michael Kenna	1897–1923	Democratic	later represented ward again (1939–1943)		68th	John Coughlin	1892–1938	Democratic	Continued as 1st ward alderman after 1923 switch to single-member constituencies, later died in office	
Michael Kenna	1897–1923	Democratic	later represented ward again (1939–1943)		69th	John Coughlin	1892–1938	Democratic	Continued as 1st ward alderman after 1923 switch to single-member constituencies, later died in office	
Michael Kenna	1897–1923	Democratic	later represented ward again (1939–1943)		70th	John Coughlin	1892–1938	Democratic	Continued as 1st ward alderman after 1923 switch to single-member constituencies, later died in office	
Michael Kenna	1897–1923	Democratic	later represented ward again (1939–1943)		71st	John Coughlin	1892–1938	Democratic	Continued as 1st ward alderman after 1923 switch to single-member constituencies, later died in office	
Michael Kenna	1897–1923	Democratic	later represented ward again (1939–1943)		72nd	John Coughlin	1892–1938	Democratic	Continued as 1st ward alderman after 1923 switch to single-member constituencies, later died in office	
Michael Kenna	1897–1923	Democratic	later represented ward again (1939–1943)		73rd	John Coughlin	1892–1938	Democratic	Continued as 1st ward alderman after 1923 switch to single-member constituencies, later died in office	
Michael Kenna	1897–1923	Democratic	later represented ward again (1939–1943)		74th	John Coughlin	1892–1938	Democratic	Continued as 1st ward alderman after 1923 switch to single-member constituencies, later died in office	
Michael Kenna	1897–1923	Democratic	later represented ward again (1939–1943)		75th	John Coughlin	1892–1938	Democratic	Continued as 1st ward alderman after 1923 switch to single-member constituencies, later died in office	
Michael Kenna	1897–1923	Democratic	later represented ward again (1939–1943)		76th	John Coughlin	1892–1938	Democratic	Continued as 1st ward alderman after 1923 switch to single-member constituencies, later died in office	
Michael Kenna	1897–1923	Democratic	later represented ward again (1939–1943)		77th	John Coughlin	1892–1938	Democratic	Continued as 1st ward alderman after 1923 switch to single-member constituencies, later died in office	
Michael Kenna	1897–1923	Democratic	later represented ward again (1939–1943)		78th	John Coughlin	1892–1938	Democratic	Continued as 1st ward alderman after 1923 switch to single-member constituencies, later died in office	
Michael Kenna	1897–1923	Democratic	later represented ward again (1939–1943)		79th	John Coughlin	1892–1938	Democratic	Continued as 1st ward alderman after 1923 switch to single-member constituencies, later died in office	
Michael Kenna	1897–1923	Democratic	later represented ward again (1939–1943)		80th	John Coughlin	1892–1938	Democratic	Continued as 1st ward alderman after 1923 switch to single-member constituencies, later died in office	
Michael Kenna	1897–1923	Democratic	later represented ward again (1939–1943)		81st	John Coughlin	1892–1938	Democratic	Continued as 1st ward alderman after 1923 switch to single-member constituencies, later died in office	
Michael Kenna	1897–1923	Democratic	later represented ward again (1939–1943)		82nd	John Coughlin	1892–1938	Democratic	Continued as 1st ward alderman after 1923 switch to single-member constituencies, later died in office	
Michael Kenna	1897–1923	Democratic	later represented ward again (1939–1943)		83rd	John Coughlin	1892–1938	Democratic	Continued as 1st ward alderman after 1923 switch to single-member constituencies, later died in office	
Michael Kenna	1897–1923	Democratic	later represented ward again (1939–1943)		84th	John Coughlin	1892–1938	Democratic	Continued as 1st ward alderman after 1923 switch to single-member constituencies, later died in office	
Michael Kenna	1897–1923	Democratic	later represented ward again (1939–1943)		85th	John Coughlin	1892–1938	Democratic	Continued as 1st ward alderman after 1923 switch to single-member constituencies, later died in office	
Michael Kenna	1897–1923	Democratic	later represented ward again (1939–1943)		86th	John Coughlin	1892–1938	Democratic	Continued as 1st ward alderman after 1923 switch to single-member constituencies, later died in office	

=== Since 1923 ===
Since 1923, wards have been represented by a single alderman. Elections have also been nonpartisan, though officeholders often still publicly affiliate with parties.

Alderman	Term in office	Councils served in	Party	Notes	Cite
John Coughlin	1892–1938	61st–93rd	Democratic	Continued as 1st ward alderman after 1923 switch to single-member constituencies, died in office	
Michael Kenna	April 2, 1939 – April 9, 1943	94th	Democratic	Previously represented ward 1897–1923	
John Budinger	April 9, 1943 – 1951	95th, 96th	Democratic		
John D'Arco Sr.	1951–1963	97th–99th	Democratic		
Michael Fiorito	February 16, 1963 – May 6, 1963	99th	Democratic		
Donald Parrillo	1963–1968	100th, 101st	Democratic	Resigned	
Fred Roti	1968–1993	101st–106th	Democratic		
Jesse Granato	1993–May 19, 2003	106th, 107th, 108th	Democratic		
Manuel Flores	May 19, 2003 – January 4, 2010	109th, 110th	Democratic	Resigned to assume office as chairman of the Illinois Commerce Commission	
Proco Joe Moreno	March 26, 2010 – May 20, 2019	111th, 112th, 113th	Democratic		
Daniel La Spata	May 20, 2019–present	114th, 115th	Democratic		

== See also ==
- First Ward Ball
