= Levi Boone =

American politician (1808–1882)

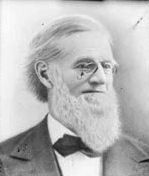

17th Mayor of Chicago
- In office March 13, 1855 – March 11, 1856
- Preceded by: Isaac Lawrence Milliken
- Succeeded by: Thomas Dyer

Chicago Alderman
- In office 1854–1855 Serving with John Evans
- Preceded by: Isaac L. Milliken
- Succeeded by: Thomas Allen
- Constituency: 2nd ward
- In office 1847–1848 Serving with Isaac Speer
- Preceded by: N.H. Bolles/ Andrew Smith
- Succeeded by: Edward Manierre
- Constituency: 2nd ward
- In office 1846–1847 Serving with George Manierre
- Preceded by: Thomas Church/ J. Young Scammon
- Succeeded by: James H. Woodworth/ Peter L. Updike
- Constituency: 1st ward

Personal details
- Born: December 6, 1808 Kentucky, US
- Died: January 24, 1882 (aged 73) Chicago, Illinois, US
- Resting place: Rosehill Cemetery
- Party: American Party (Know-Nothings)
- Spouse: Louise M. Smith
- Children: 11
- Education: Transylvania University
- Profession: Medical Doctor

Levi Day Boone (December 6, 1808 – January 24, 1882) served as mayor of Chicago, Illinois (1855–1856) for the American Party (Know-Nothings).

== Early life ==
Boone was born near Lexington, Kentucky, the seventh son of Squire and Anna Grubbs Boone. Squire Boone, Sr. was Daniel Boone's father and Levi Boone's great-grandfather, making Levi Boone Daniel Boone's great-nephew. Young Levi's father died when Levi was the age of 9. Squire succumbed to wounds which he incurred at the Battle of Horseshoe Bend.

Despite the poverty the family was plunged into by the death of Squire Boone, Levi graduated from the medical school of Transylvania University in Lexington, Kentucky in 1829 at the age of 21. He moved to Illinois and eventually established a practice in Hillsboro. In 1832, he served in the Black Hawk War, first in the cavalry and then as a surgeon. In 1833, Boone married Louise M. Smith, daughter of Theophilus W. Smith, Justice of the Illinois Supreme Court.Levi and Louise had 11 children.

== Chicago years ==
Arriving in Chicago in 1835, he helped organize the Cook County Medical Board and served as the organization's first secretary. Boone had a medical practice with Charles V. Dyer. He was elected the first president of the Chicago Medical Society in 1850.

In 1843, he contributed to the rift in the congregation of Chicago's First Baptist Church by giving a lecture on the scriptural basis of slavery.

In 1850, Boone unsuccessfully ran for Mayor of Chicago. He placed second, receiving 32.90% of the vote (losing to James Curtiss, who received 45.51% of the vote).

Running a second time, Boone was elected mayor in the 1855 Chicago mayoral election. Supported by a coalition of Know Nothings and temperance advocates, Boone ran for mayor on an anti-immigrant platform, along with 7 aldermen running on the same ticket. He defeated incumbent Isaac Lawrence Milliken with nearly 53% of the vote.

During his only year in office, he reorganized the Chicago police, combining the Day Police and the Night Watch into a single police force with 3 eight-hour shifts and requiring the police, for the first time, to wear uniforms. No foreign-born police were retained in the reorganization, and all new appointments were native-born Americans. He demanded that all applicants for city jobs, especially the newly organized police force, be able to prove to have been born on American soil.

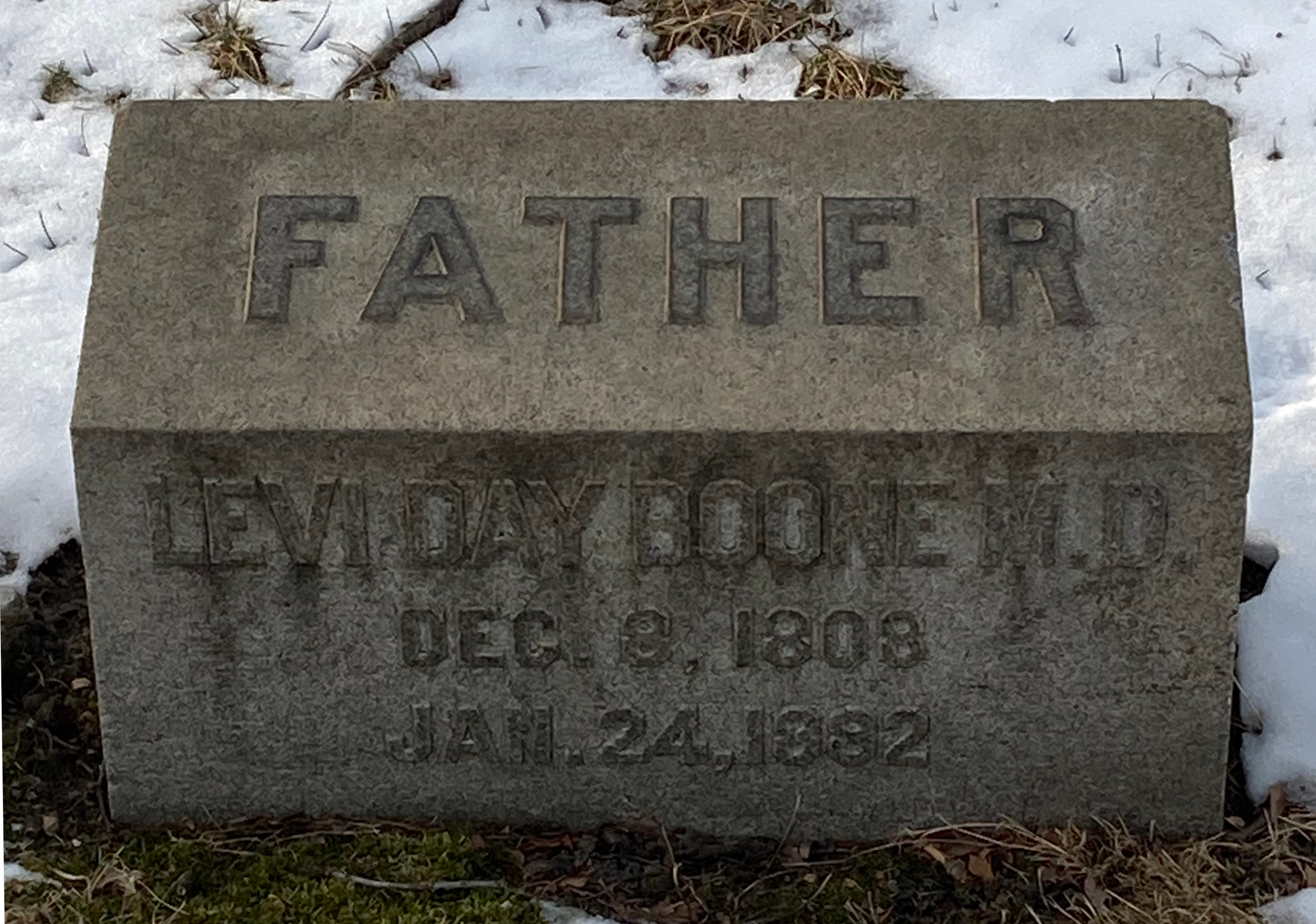
Boone's grave at Rosehill Cemetery

Though not a teetotaler, Boone was a temperance advocate and worked to prohibit the sale and consumption of alcohol. Anticipating the passage by referendum of a Maine law to prohibit the sale of beverage alcohol in June 1855, he got the city council to pass an ordinance that raised the cost of liquor licenses from $50 to $300 a year, limited the term to three months, and attempted to enforce an old and disregarded ordinance to close taverns on Sundays. Many saw this as a means of attacking German immigrants, and on April 21, the move sparked the Lager Beer Riot after several tavern owners were arrested for selling beer on a Sunday. The referendum failed in June 1855, by a statewide vote of 54% to 46%.

Boone did not run for re-election in the mayoral election of 1856.

In 1862, Boone was arrested and briefly held in Camp Douglas on suspicion that he had helped a Confederate prisoner to escape.

He died in Chicago on January 24, 1882, and is buried in Rosehill Cemetery.
