= Cary B. Lewis =

African American sportswriter (1888–1946)

Cary Blackburn Lewis Sr.
- Born: July 15, 1888; Louisville, Kentucky, U.S.
- Died: December 8, 1946 (aged 58); Chicago, Illinois, U.S.
- Burial place: Lincoln Cemetery
- Occupations: Sportswriter, newspaper editor, publicist
- Known for: Sportswriting on Negro league baseball
- Spouse: Georgia "Bertha" A. Lattimore (m. c. 1925–1946; death)

Cary Blackburn Lewis Sr. (1888–1946) was an American sportswriter, newspaper editor, and publicist. He was instrumental in the formation of the Negro National Baseball League (NNL) in the 1920s. Lewis worked at The Chicago Defender, the Courier-Journal, and the Indianapolis Freeman newspapers.

== Biography ==
Cary Blackburn Lewis Sr. was born on July 15, 1888, in Louisville, Kentucky, US. His draft card used an earlier birth date of July 15, 1880 or 1881. He was the son of Plummer Lewis of Louisville, Kentucky, a veteran of the American Civil War who served with the 28th U.S. Colored Infantry.

Lewis served as managing editor of The Chicago Defender, an African American newspaper, from 1910 to 1920. During his career he also worked as a reporter for the Courier-Journal in Louisville, Kentucky; and the Indianapolis Freeman. Lewis often wrote about Black baseball games and teams, including the Leland Giants. He also wrote about the Black community.

Lewis was contributory in the formation of the Negro National Baseball League (NNL), he was one of four people to create the NLL constitution. The others to form the NLL constitution included David Wyatt from the Indianapolis Ledger, Elwood C. Knox from Indianapolis Freeman, and attorney Elisha Scott. He also served as publicity director for Booker T. Washington in later life.

He died on December 8, 1946, in Chicago; and is buried at Lincoln Cemetery in Chicago.

== Personal life ==
Around 1925, Lewis married Georgia "Bertha" A. Lattimore. She was the daughter of Beauregard Moseley and was a teacher. They lived at 4510 Vincennes Avenue in Chicago and were featured in the society pages. Together they had two sons. His son Cary B. Lewis Jr. served in the military, became a professor in business administration, and was a Certified Public Accountant.

== See also ==
- Negro National League (1920–1931)
- Negro National League (1933–1948)
