= 1856 Chicago mayoral election =

Chicago mayoral election, 1856
- March 10, 1856
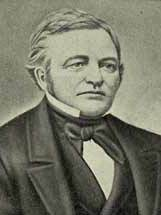

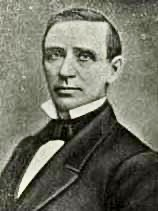
Candidate	Thomas Dyer	Francis Cornwall Sherman
Party	Democratic	Anti-Nebraska Democratic
Alliance		Know Nothing
Popular vote	4,712	4,138
Percentage	53.24%	46.76%
Mayor before election
Levi Boone
Know Nothing
Elected mayor
Thomas Dyer
Democratic

In the 1856 Chicago mayoral election, Thomas Dyer defeated former mayor Francis Cornwall Sherman. The race was shaped by the divisive national political debate surrounding the issue of slavery, particularly debate surrounding the controversial Kansas–Nebraska Act, and the election was treated by many as a referendum on it. Dyer vocally supported the act, while Sherman stood in opposition to it.

The election was held on March 10.

== Campaigning ==
First-term incumbent Know Nothing mayor Levi Boone did not seek reelection. His tenure had been very unpopular, and his anti-immigrant policies had led to a strong blowback from Chicago's immigrant community.

Taking place several years prior to the start of the American Civil War, the election was shaped by the tenuous national debate surrounding slavery. The campaign was particularly shaped by debate surrounding the Kansas–Nebraska Act (such as whether or not popular sovereignty should be applied in determining the status of new states as slave or free states). The debate was so central to the election that rather than affiliate with traditional political parties, both (Democratic) candidates for mayor instead ran under the banner of "Pro-Nebraska" (Dyer) and Anti-Nebraska (Sherman).

Democratic US Senator Stephen A. Douglas, an author of the Nebraska-Kansas Act who was seeking the 1856 Democratic presidential nomination and who would be up for reelection as a senator in two years, sought to bolster his electoral prospects by utilizing the Chicago mayoral election to illustrate popular support in Illinois for his stance on slavery (he was a prominent supporter of applying the principle of popular sovereignty to slavery). Douglas strongly backed Dyer and sought to frame the mayoral race as a referendum about his stance on slavery. He and his allies had much to gain by making that the key issue of the election.

In February 1856, two organizations that sided with Douglas' side of the debate had nominated separate candidates. "Douglas Democracy" nominated L. M. Keith, and a fusion organization that included "Nebraska Democrats" nominated Dyer. However, Keith refused to accept the mayoral nomination, thus Dyer was also supported by "Douglas Democracy" (who voted by acclamation to support his candidacy). Dyer was nominated alongside a ticket of candidates for other municipal offices.

Sherman did not run alongside a ticket of his own. However, his candidacy was supported by the Know Nothings, who in mid-February decided that they would place his name atop their own ticket, effectively making him their nominee. For the remainder of their ticket, for citywide offices the Know Nothing Party renominated incumbent party members (City Treasurer William F. DeWolf, City Collector Jacob Russell, and City Surveyor Samuel S. Greele) along with two non-incumbents (Reuben Cleveland for city marshall J.D. Ward for city attorney). The Know Nothing Party also nominated candidates for the Chicago Common Council in six of the city's nine wards. There is not a clear historical record as to whether Sherman ever considered himself a Know Nothing, nor as to whether he actively had sought their support. Some newspaper speculation at the time, however, existed that the Know Nothing Party might have actually nominated Sherman to harm his candidacy by casting doubt on his anti-slavery, anti-Kansas-Nebraska Act and anti-Stephen Douglas credentials, but this is doubtful since in the two previous mayoral elections the city's Know Nothing Party had similarly run fusion tickets with candidates they felt had appeal beyond the party's conventional voter base. Nevertheless, there is some reason to believe that their endorsement impeded his candidacy

The campaign was very contentious. Individuals on either side of the debate resorted to issuing character attacks against those on the opposing side. Among incidents that arose from the political tension was a public fight between Sherman-supporting Chicago Journal editor C. L. Wilson and Dyer-supporting United States District Attorney Thomas Hoyne in late-February, which resulted in them both tumbling through a plate-glass window at the Illinois State Bank Building.

Sherman was regarded to be the "anti-slavery extension" candidate, and received the backing of many Whig Party members.

Dyer's campaign was considered to be well-funded.

It was alleged that Douglas Democrats, in an effort to stack the vote in Dyer's favor, brought in as many as 1,500 Irish voters from neighboring Bridgeport, which was then outside the city limits, to vote illegally in the election as well as German voters. It was believed that German voters were inclined to support the "Pro Nebraska" ticket not out of their stance on the issue of the Nebraska Act but the presence of liquor candidates on the ticket. Similar allegations had previously arisen in the previous election. If that is true for the 1856 election, electoral fraud would have contributed to Dyer's margin of victory.

== Endorsements ==
Thomas Dyer
- Samuel Ashton, registrar of the U.S. Land Office and alderman
- Stephen A. Douglas, United States Senator
- Thomas Hoyne, United States District Attorney

Newspapers

- Chicago Times
Francis Cornwall Sherman
- C. L. Wilson, editor of Chicago Daily Journal
- C.S. Blackwell, baptist reverend
- Francis Hoffmann
- Edwin C. Larned, lawyer and political activist
- William B. Ogden, former Mayor of Chicago
- J. Young Scammon
- Mark Skinner, former member of the Illinois House of Representatives
- John Wentworth, former Mayor of Chicago and US Congressman

Newspapers

- Chicago Daily Journal
- Chicago Democrat
- Daily Democratic Press
- Illinois Staats-Zeitung
- Chicago Tribune

Political parties

- Know Nothings

== Results ==
1856 Chicago mayoral election
Party	Candidate	Votes	%
Democratic	Thomas Dyer	4,712	53.24
Anti-Nebraska Democratic	Francis Cornwall Sherman	4,138	46.76
Turnout		8,850	

The Daily Democratic Press and the Chicago Tribune alleged that Dyer had won due to the support of voters that were foreign-born. The Chicago Tribune, which at the time trafficked Anti-Catholicism, alleged that the city's Irish Catholic voters had voted as a unified bloc in support of the pro-slavery position.

In the coinciding municipal races, the Know Nothing Party won only two Common Council seats and the "Nebraska" slate won the majority of offices.
