= Isaac Lawrence Milliken =

American politician (1813–1889)

Isaac Milliken
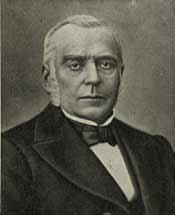

16th Mayor of Chicago
- In office March 15, 1854 – March 13, 1855
- Preceded by: Charles Gray
- Succeeded by: Levi Boone

Chicago Alderman from the 2nd ward
- In office 1850–1854 Serving with Alexander Loyd (1850–1851); Hugh Maher (1851–1853); John Evans (1853–1854)
- Preceded by: George W. Snow/ Henry L. Rucker
- Succeeded by: Levi Boone

Personal details
- Born: August 29, 1813 Saco, Maine
- Died: December 2, 1889 (aged 74) Chicago, Illinois, United States
- Resting place: Rosehill Cemetery
- Party: Democratic

Isaac Lawrence Milliken (August 29, 1813 – December 2, 1889) served as mayor of Chicago, Illinois from 1854 to 1855. He was a member of the Democratic Party.

Born in Saco, Massachusetts (now in Maine), Milliken moved to Chicago in 1837 and set up a blacksmith shop on Randolph Street. Here, Milliken taught himself law and was twice elected alderman and appointed an assistant county judge.

In the election of 1854, Milliken defeated Amos Gaylord Throop, who ran on the Temperance Party ticket, with nearly 60% of the vote. Although Throop was the temperance candidate, after winning the election, Milliken declared himself in favor of temperance as well. He ran for re-election the following year against Levi Boone, of the American Party and lost with 47% of the vote.

Following his term as mayor, Milliken stayed in public service, becoming a police magistrate.

He died at his home in Chicago on December 2, 1889, and was buried at Rosehill Cemetery.
