= Daniel Serritella =

American politician

Member of the Illinois Senate (1st District)
- In office 1930–1942
- Preceded by: Adolph Marks
- Succeeded by: Lawrence E. Dowd

Personal details
- Born: August 29, 1898 Chicago, Illinois
- Died: 1967
- Party: Republican

Daniel Serritella was an American politician who served as a member of the Illinois Senate.

Serritella was born on August 29, 1898 in Chicago, Illinois. He was elected in 1930 to the Illinois Senate representing the 1st District in Cook County succeeding Adolph Marks. During that time, Serritella also served as Chicago's Sealer, a role that put him in charge of the accuracy of merchant scales and measures. Widely considered an ally of Al Capone, and one of his de facto representatives in both city and state government, Serritella was convicted in 1932 of accepting bribes of money and food from merchants in exchange for allowing them to fix their scales. The investigation of the inaccurate scales was conducted by the Secret Six, a Chicago vigilante organization, and turned up hundreds of instances of "short-weighting," costing Chicago consumers "millions of dollars." Serritella and his deputy, Harry Hochstein, were both fined $2,000 and sentenced to a year in the county jail, but the conviction was tossed out on appeal and neither man served any jail time. Serritella was reelected in 1934 and in 1938. He was succeeded by Democrat Lawrence E. Dowd in 1942. In 1953, he was declared mentally incompetent and placed in the custody of his brother, Vincent Serritella.
