= Robert R. Jackson =

American politician and baseball owner (1870–1942)

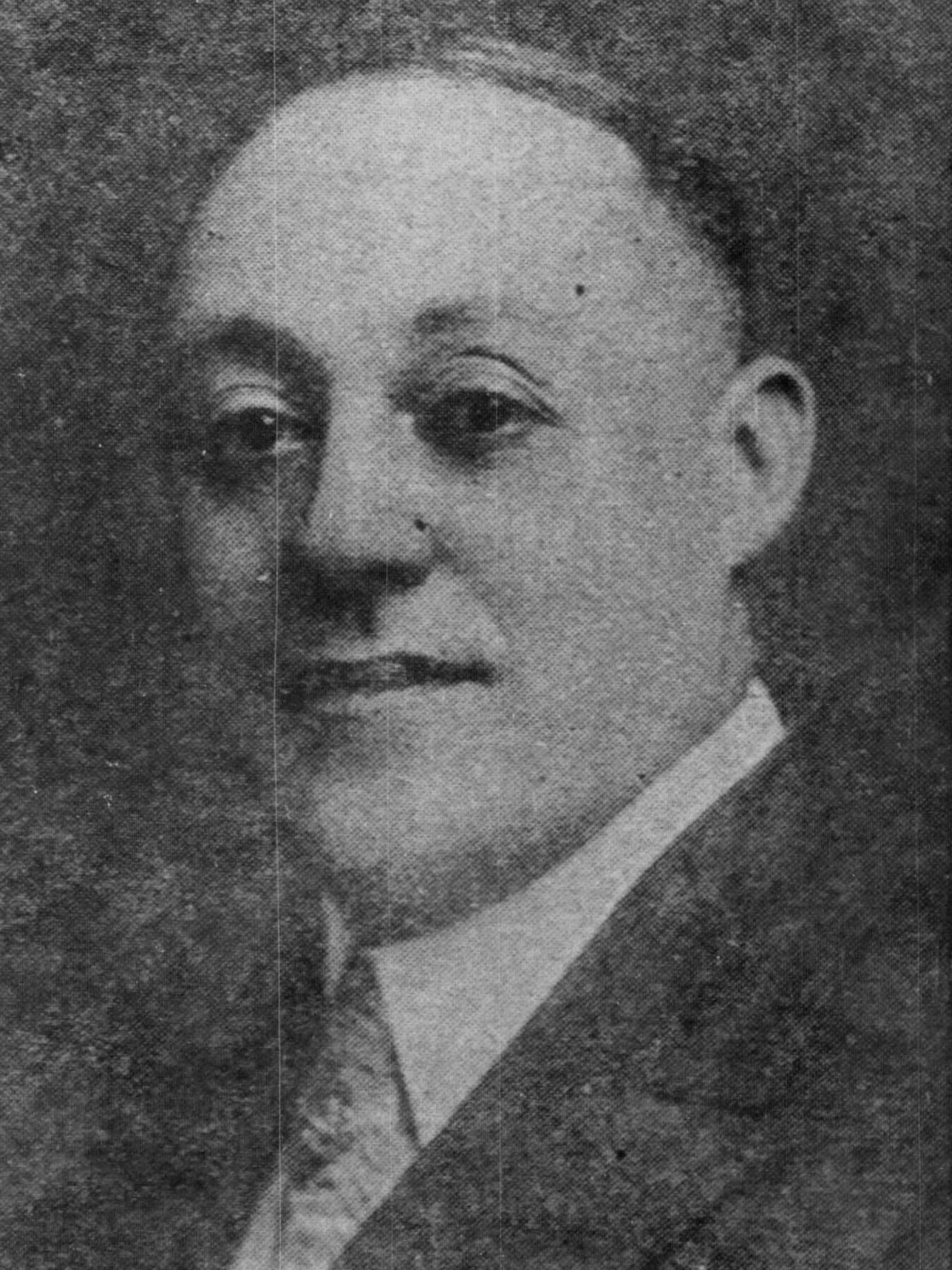

Robert R. Jackson (September 1, 1870, in Malta, Illinois – June 12, 1942) was a state legislator in Illinois as well as a baseball team founder, baseball league commissioner, and Chicago alderman. Jackson was educated in the Chicago public school system until leaving school to care for family after the eighth grade. Prior to his tenure in the legislature, he worked as a newspaper salesman, postal service employee, elevator operator and baseball team owner. He was a Republican.

== Career ==
Jackson's twenty-one year tenure at the Chicago Postal System included twelve years as assistant superintendent at Armour station, at the time the highest role held by a Black man in the Chicago postal system. Jackson was also a veteran of the Spanish-American War when his National Guard regiment, Illinois' Eighth was activated to Cuba.

In 1910, Jackson cofounded with Beauregard Moseley the Leland Giants, Chicago's first African-American baseball team. He also served a two-year term as Commissioner of the Negro American League. When Jackson left the postal system to return to the print business, his Fraternal Press was believed to be the largest printing business owned by a Black person.

Jackson was elected to the Illinois House of Representatives in 1912; he was seated just a short time before the legislature adjourned sine die. Speaker William Michael McKinley appointed Jackson to roles on a number of committees including federal relations and military affairs. Jackson was re-elected in 1914 and 1916 and was a part of Illinois' first state film censorship law. He served as an alderman in Chicago City Council for the second and third wards from 1918-1939 after his time as a state legislator was term limited.

== See also ==
- List of African-American officeholders (1900–1959)
- 49th Illinois General Assembly
- George French Ecton
