= George F. Harding Jr. =

American politician

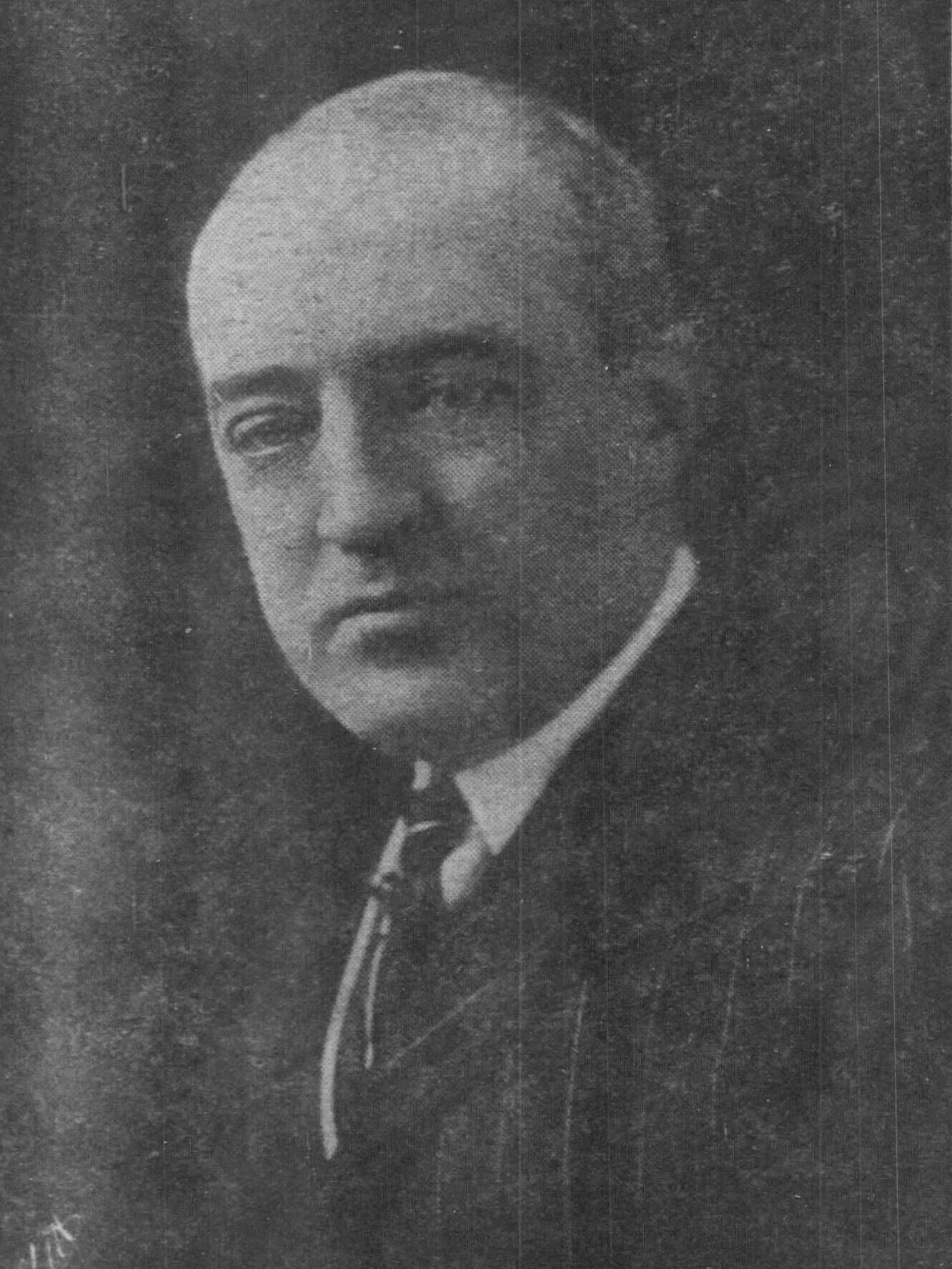
- Harding, circa 1927

Cook County Treasurer
- In office 1926–1930
- Succeeded by: Joseph McDonough

City Controller of Chicago
- In office 1919–1923

Member of the Illinois Senate (1st District)
- In office 1914–1918
- Preceded by: Francis P. Brady
- Succeeded by: Francis P. Brady

Member of the Chicago City Council from the 2nd ward
- In office 1905–1915 Serving with Thomas J. Dixon (1905–1910); Wilson Shufelt (1910–1912); Norris Hugh (1912–1915)
- Preceded by: Charles Alling
- Succeeded by: Oscar Stanton De Priest

Personal details
- Party: Republican

George F. Harding Jr. was an American politician who served as a member of the Illinois Senate and as an alderman in Chicago.

Harding served as an alderman in Chicago being elected to six terms in 1903, 1905, 1907, 1909, 1911, and 1913. Harding was elected in 1914 to the Illinois Senate representing the 1st District in Cook County succeeding Francis P. Brady. He served one term and was succeeded by his predecessor. He served as city controller of Chicago from 1919 through 1923 and as Cook County treasurer from 1926 through 1930.
