= Lager Beer Riot =

Series of riots in Chicago in 1855

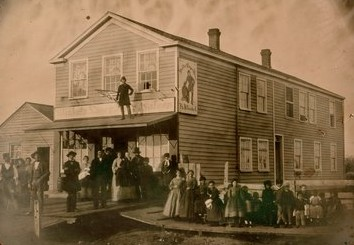
- Klinkel's Hall, a German American-owned drinking establishment, was involved in the Lager Beer Riot. Photograph circa 1854-1856.
- Date: April 21, 1855
- Location: Chicago, Illinois
- Caused by: Closing taverns on Sundays and raising the cost of liquor licenses

Parties
German and Irish immigrants	Chicago Police Department

Lead figures
	Mayor Levi Boone

Casualties
- Death: 1
- Arrested: 60

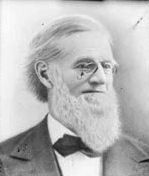
In 1855, Chicago Mayor Levi Boone, a Nativist politician, renewed enforcement of an old local ordinance mandating that city taverns be closed on Sundays and led the city council to raise the cost of a liquor license, which brought on the German and Irish American immigrant protest known as Lager Beer Riot

The Lager Beer Riot occurred on April 21, 1855 in Chicago, Illinois, and was the first major civil disturbance in the city. Mayor Levi Boone, a Nativist politician, renewed enforcement of an old local ordinance mandating that taverns be closed on Sundays and led the city council to raise the cost of a liquor license from $50 per year to $300 per year, renewable quarterly. The move was seen as targeting German immigrants in particular and so caused a greater sense of community within the group.

== Background ==
Chicago's rapid growth in the 1840s and 1850s was largely because of German and Irish Catholic immigrants. Chicago was developing into an attractive opportunity for many immigrants. Although the jobs that awaited the immigrant were often poor-paying wage based positions, opportunities were often more promising than that of their home country. The immigrants settled in their own neighborhoods, German immigrants congregating mainly on the North Side, across the Chicago River from City Hall and the older Protestant part of the city. The German settlers worked a six-day week, leaving Sunday as their primary day to socialize; much socialization took place in the small taverns that dotted the North Side of Chicago. German-language newspapers, such as the Illinois Staats-Zeitung and social movements like the Turners and German craft unions gave the German population of Chicago a high degree of social and political cohesiveness. Additionally, the Forty-Eighters among them had previously used demonstrations as a political tool during the European revolutions of 1848.

As in much of the rest of the country, nativist distrust of Catholic influence produced a backlash in the form of the "Know-Nothing" movement. In the election of 1854, the Temperance Party candidate, Amos Throop, lost by a margin of nearly 20% to Isaac Lawrence Milliken. Nevertheless, after winning the election, Milliken declared himself in favor of temperance as well. Milliken lost the following year to Levi Boone, the American Party candidate. Levi Boone ran on an anti-immigrant and anti-Catholic platform of the Know-Nothing Party, which garnered him enough support to win the election. The Know-Nothing Party nationally had been feeding off the swell of nationalist sentiments brewing in the nation in the 1840s and 1850s. In his inauguration speech, Mayor Boone stated, "I cannot be blind to the existence in our midst of a powerful politico-religious organization, all its members owing, and its chief officers bound under an oath of allegiance to the temporal, as well as the spiritual supremacy of a foreign despot." Associated with his fear of foreigners, Boone, a Baptist and temperance advocate, believed that the Sabbath was profaned by having drinking establishments open on Sunday. However, the temperance movement was seen in the eyes of immigrants as a means of control used by the elites to further control the working class. Although Boone's actions were in anticipation of Illinois enacting a Maine law by referendum that would prohibit the sale of alcohol for recreational purposes, the referendum failed in June 1855, by a statewide vote of 54% to 46%. The following year, after Boone was turned out of office, the prohibition was repealed.

Before 1853, Chicago had only "a small force of armed municipal officers." The Cook County sheriff's office was largely responsible for policing the city, whose constable system "was modeled on the colonial and English systems." Lacking any distinction of their own, elected town constables and night watchmen contributed to the protection of the city. In response to the inadequacy of the constable system, a police department separate and distinct from municipal courts was established in 1853. All eighty men who comprised the newly formed Chicago Police department were native born.

== Events ==
Despite the renewed enforcement of Chicago's liquor ordinance, tavern owners continued to sell beer on Sundays. That resulted in over 200 Germans being arrested in violation of both the license and the Sunday ordinances. The numerous arrests led to the scheduling of a test case for the 21st of April. Saloon keepers "decided to unite for defense and resistance, [and] contributed toward a common fund and counsel to represent all."

Robin Einhorn argues that the scheduling of such an event, "in effect, scheduled the riot." Protesters clashed with police near the Cook County Court House. Waves of angry immigrants stormed the downtown area. "As the marchers, coming from the north with fife and drum, approached the Chicago River at Clark Street," the mayor ordered the swing bridges opened to stop further waves of protestors from crossing the river. This left some trapped on the bridges, and police then fired shots at protesters stuck on the Clark Street Bridge over the Chicago River. A policeman named George W. Hunt was shot in the arm by a rioter named Peter Martin. Martin was then killed by police, and Hunt's arm had to be amputated. Rumors flew throughout the city that more protesters were killed. There is no evidence to support that, but loaded cannons set on the public square contributed to those rumors.

== Outcomes ==
The Lager Beer Riot led to a compromise in which the city council lowered the liquor license fee from $300 to $100. The council decided not to release those already imprisoned for not paying the $300 fee, but most of those arrested during the riot were released and not charged.

The Lager Beer Riot illustrated the risk German immigrants were willing to bear to protect German saloon owners whom they perceived as leaders of their community. The mayor's temperance policy thus united German property owners, who could have been a natural ally of the mayor because of their strong interest in order, with working-class German immigrants.

In addition to the economic implications of the riot, there were compelling socio-cultural reasons for German immigrants to protest the newly instated ordinance. Mitrani posits that, "To the German and Irish immigrants, drinking beer on Sundays was an orderly and habitual way to spend their one day off.... Yet on a deeper level, this clash over drinking marked the opening salvo in a struggle over how the new class of wage workers would spend their time." The riot over beer represents a larger issue of a nativist approach to control the immigrant working class. Drinking, particularly on Sundays, was considered unacceptable. Closing taverns on Sundays and raising the cost of liquor licenses was a way to enforce what was considered acceptable behavior.

While the new policies were an attempt to control the immigrant class, the events of the riot proved to be a call for a new type of order. Within a week of the riot, a committee was formed and worked with the city government to pass a series of reforms that ultimately resulted in the reorganization of the Chicago Police Department.

The lasting effects of such a traumatic event would influence Chicago for decades to come. Tensions continued to increase between those who advocated temperance and those who enjoyed the pastime. According to Sam Mitrani, "the bulk of those arrested [had] working-class occupations...[and] the only arrestees who were not part of or tied to [Chicago's] growing working class were four ministers, eight doctors, and four lawyers."

== See also ==
- List of incidents of civil unrest in the United States
- Germans in Chicago
