= 2nd ward, Chicago =

Ward in Chicago

2nd Ward - Chicago
- Ward
- Ward 2
- Current Chicago ward map, with 2nd ward highlighted in red
- Country: United States
- State: Illinois
- County: Cook
- City: Chicago
- Established: 1837
- Communities: list

Government
  - Type: Ward
  - Body: Chicago City Council
  - Alderperson: Brian K. Hopkins (Democratic Party)

The 2nd ward is one of the 50 aldermanic wards with representation in the City Council of Chicago, Illinois.

== Past alders ==
The current alderperson for the 2nd ward is Brian K. Hopkins.

=== Before 1923 ===
Before 1923, wards were represented by two aldermen.

Aldermen					# Council	Aldermen					
Alderman	Term in office	Party	Notes	Cite	# Council	Alderman	Term in office	Party	Notes	Cite	
Peter Bolles	1837–1838				1st	Francis C. Sherman	1837–1838				
James Curtiss	1838–1839	Democratic	Later elected alderman again in 1846 in 3rd ward		2nd	John S.C. Hogan	1838–1839		Redistricted from 4th ward (where he served 1837–1838)		
Eli S. Prescott	1839–1840				3rd	Clement C. Stose	1839–1840				
James Carney	1840–1841		Later elected alderman again in 1849 in the 1st ward		4th	Augustus Garrett	1840–1841	Democratic			
Jason McCord	1841–1842				5th	Peter Page	1841–1842		Later elected alderman again in 1849 in 1st ward		
Charles McDonnell	1842–1843		Later elected alderman again in 1847 in 4th ward		6th	Caleb Morgan	1842–1843				
Jason McCord	1843–1844				7th	Charles Sauter	1843–1844				
Samuel W. Tallmadge	1844–1845				8th	William Wheeler	1844–1845				
Robert P. Hamilton	1845–1846				9th	James H Woodworth	1845–1846		Later elected alderman again in 1847 in 1st ward		
N.H. Bolles	1846–1847				10th	Andrew Smith	1846–1847				
Levi Boone	1847–1848		Redistricted from 2nd ward		11th	Isaac Speer	1847–1849				
Edward Manierre	1848–1849				12th	Isaac Speer	1847–1849				
George W. Snow	1849–1850				13th	Henry L. Rucker	1849–1850				
George W. Snow	1849–1850				14th	Isaac Lawrence Milliken	1850–1854	Democratic			
Alexander Loyd	1850–1851				14th	Isaac Lawrence Milliken	1850–1854	Democratic			
Hugh Maher	1851–1853				15th	Isaac Lawrence Milliken	1850–1854	Democratic			
Hugh Maher	1851–1853				16th	Isaac Lawrence Milliken	1850–1854	Democratic			
John Evans	1853–1855				17th	Isaac Lawrence Milliken	1850–1854	Democratic			
John Evans	1853–1855				18th	Levi Boone	1854–1855				
John Evans	1853–1855				19th	Thomas Allen	1855–1856				
Owen Kendall	1856–1858				19th	R.M. Hough	1855–1856				
Owen Kendall	1856–1858				20th	Lucius A. Willard	1856–1857				
Owen Kendall	1856–1858				20th	Jacob Harris	1857–1858				
Owen Kendall	1856–1858				21st	Jacob Harris	1857–1858				
Smith McClevey	1858–1859				21st	Jacob Harris	1857–1858				
Smith McClevey	1858–1859				22nd	Charles H. Abbott	1858–1860				
Jacob Harris	1859–1861				23rd	Charles H. Abbott	1858–1860				
Jacob Harris	1859–1861				24th	James M. Marshall	1860–1861				
J.Q. Hoyt	1861–1863				25th	Patrick Sanders	1861–1862				
J.Q. Hoyt	1861–1863				26th	Peter Shimp	1862–1866 (Note: declared self a "war democrat" during first term, voting often with the Republican Party aldermen during that term)	Democratic Party			
A.D. Titsworth	1863–1865		Redistricted from 3rd ward		27th	Peter Shimp	1862–1866	Democratic Party			
A.D. Titsworth	1863–1865		Redistricted from 3rd ward		28th	Peter Shimp	1862–1866	Democratic Party			
William H. Carter	1865–1867				29th	Peter Shimp	1862–1866	Democratic Party			
William H. Carter	1865–1867				30th	Calvin DeWolf	1866–1868		Previously served in 3rd ward		
Arthur Dixon	1867–1875	Republican	later elected alderman again in 1879 in 1st ward		31st	Calvin DeWolf	1866–1868		Previously served in 3rd ward		
Arthur Dixon	1867–1875	Republican	later elected alderman again in 1879 in 1st ward		32nd	P.M. Donnellan	1868–1870				
Arthur Dixon	1867–1875	Republican	later elected alderman again in 1879 in 1st ward		33rd	P.M. Donnellan	1868–1870				
Arthur Dixon	1867–1875	Republican	later elected alderman again in 1879 in 1st ward		34th	P.M. Donnellan	1868–1870				
Arthur Dixon	1867–1875	Republican	later elected alderman again in 1879 in 1st ward		35th	Joseph E. Otis	1870–1872				
Arthur Dixon	1867–1875	Republican	later elected alderman again in 1879 in 1st ward		36th	Joseph E. Otis	1870–1872				
Arthur Dixon	1867–1875	Republican	later elected alderman again in 1879 in 1st ward		37th	Francis W. Warren	1872–1876				
Arthur Dixon	1867–1875	Republican	later elected alderman again in 1879 in 1st ward		38th	Francis W. Warren	1872–1876				
—N/a						Francis W. Warren	1872–1876				39th
Addison Ballard	1876–1881	Republican			40th	Jacob Rosenberg	1876–1878				
Addison Ballard	1876–1881	Republican			41st	Jacob Rosenberg	1876–1878				
Addison Ballard	1876–1881	Republican			42nd	Patrick Sanders	1978–1886	Democratic			
Addison Ballard	1876–1881	Republican			43rd	Patrick Sanders	1978–1886	Democratic			
Addison Ballard	1876–1881	Republican			44th	Patrick Sanders	1978–1886	Democratic			
James T. Appleton	1881–1889	Democratic	redistricted into 1st ward ahead for 1889 election and lost the election in that ward		45th	Patrick Sanders	1978–1886	Democratic			
James T. Appleton	1881–1889	Democratic	redistricted into 1st ward ahead for 1889 election and lost the election in that ward		46th	Patrick Sanders	1978–1886	Democratic			
James T. Appleton	1881–1889	Democratic	redistricted into 1st ward ahead for 1889 election and lost the election in that ward		47th	Patrick Sanders	1978–1886	Democratic			
James T. Appleton	1881–1889	Democratic	redistricted into 1st ward ahead for 1889 election and lost the election in that ward		48th	Patrick Sanders	1978–1886	Democratic			
James T. Appleton	1881–1889	Democratic	redistricted into 1st ward ahead for 1889 election and lost the election in that ward		49th	Patrick Sanders	1978–1886	Democratic			
James T. Appleton	1881–1889	Democratic	redistricted into 1st ward ahead for 1889 election and lost the election in that ward		50th	George H. Mueller	1886–1888	Republican			
James T. Appleton	1881–1889	Democratic	redistricted into 1st ward ahead for 1889 election and lost the election in that ward		51st	George H. Mueller	1886–1888	Republican			
James T. Appleton	1881–1889	Democratic	redistricted into 1st ward ahead for 1889 election and lost the election in that ward		52nd	John H. Hamline	1888–1889		Redistricted from 3rd ward		
John Summerfield	1889–1891				53rd	Frank C. Vierling	1889–1892				
John Summerfield	1889–1891				54th	Frank C. Vierling	1889–1892				
John W. Woodard	1891–1893				55th	Frank C. Vierling	1889–1892				
John W. Woodard	1891–1893				56th	Daniel J. Horan	1892–1894				
Martin Best	1893–1897	Republican			57th	Daniel J. Horan	1892–1894				
Martin Best	1893–1897	Republican			58th	Addison Ballard	1894–1896	Republican (Note: Ballard was elected in the 1894 aldermanic election as an independent Republican, rather than being nominated by the city's Republican Party for that election)			
Martin Best	1893–1897	Republican			59th	Addison Ballard	1894–1896	Republican			
Martin Best	1893–1897	Republican			60th	Charles F. Gunther	1896–1900	Democratic			
Patrick J. Cook	1897–1899				61st	Charles F. Gunther	1896–1900	Democratic			
Patrick J. Cook	1897–1899				62nd	Charles F. Gunther	1896–1900	Democratic			
Eugene R. Pike	1899–1901	Republican			63rd	Charles F. Gunther	1896–1900	Democratic			
Eugene R. Pike	1899–1901	Republican			64th	William Hale Thompson	1900–1902	Republican			
Charles Alling	1901–1905	Republican	Redistricted from 3rd ward		65th	William Hale Thompson	1900–1902	Republican			
Charles Alling	1901–1905	Republican	Redistricted from 3rd ward		65th	1901 redistricting resulted in two "holdover" council members (Dixon and Thompson) being drawn into the ward. Ward was temporary represented by three aldermen					
Charles Alling	1901–1905	Republican	Redistricted from 3rd ward		65th	Thomas J. Dixon	1901–1910	Republican	Redistricted from 3rd ward		
Charles Alling	1901–1905	Republican	Redistricted from 3rd ward		66th	Thomas J. Dixon	1901–1910	Republican	Redistricted from 3rd ward		
Charles Alling	1901–1905	Republican	Redistricted from 3rd ward		67th	Thomas J. Dixon	1901–1910	Republican	Redistricted from 3rd ward		
Charles Alling	1901–1905	Republican	Redistricted from 3rd ward		68th	Thomas J. Dixon	1901–1910	Republican	Redistricted from 3rd ward		
George F. Harding Jr.	1905–1915				69th	Thomas J. Dixon	1901–1910	Republican	Redistricted from 3rd ward		
George F. Harding Jr.	1905–1915				70th	Thomas J. Dixon	1901–1910	Republican	Redistricted from 3rd ward		
George F. Harding Jr.	1905–1915				71st	Thomas J. Dixon	1901–1910	Republican	Redistricted from 3rd ward		
George F. Harding Jr.	1905–1915				72nd	Thomas J. Dixon	1901–1910	Republican	Redistricted from 3rd ward		
George F. Harding Jr.	1905–1915				73rd	Thomas J. Dixon	1901–1910	Republican	Redistricted from 3rd ward		
George F. Harding Jr.	1905–1915				74th	Wilson Shufelt	1910–1912				
George F. Harding Jr.	1905–1915				75th	Wilson Shufelt	1910–1912				
George F. Harding Jr.	1905–1915				76th	Norris Hugh	1912–1918		Later elected alderman again in 1943 in 3rd ward		
George F. Harding Jr.	1905–1915				77th	Norris Hugh	1912–1918		Later elected alderman again in 1943 in 3rd ward		
George F. Harding Jr.	1905–1915				78th	Norris Hugh	1912–1918		Later elected alderman again in 1943 in 3rd ward		
Oscar Stanton De Priest	1915–1917	Republican			79th	Norris Hugh	1912–1918		Later elected alderman again in 1943 in 3rd ward		
Oscar Stanton De Priest	1915–1917	Republican			80th	Norris Hugh	1912–1918		Later elected alderman again in 1943 in 3rd ward		
Louis B. Anderson	1917–1933	Republican			81st	Norris Hugh	1912–1918		Later elected alderman again in 1943 in 3rd ward		
Louis B. Anderson	1917–1933	Republican			82nd	Robert R. Jackson	1918–1923	Republican	Redistricted to the 3rd ward in 1923		
Louis B. Anderson	1917–1933	Republican			83rd	Robert R. Jackson	1918–1923	Republican	Redistricted to the 3rd ward in 1923		
Louis B. Anderson	1917–1933	Republican			84th	Robert R. Jackson	1918–1923	Republican	Redistricted to the 3rd ward in 1923		
Louis B. Anderson	1917–1933	Republican			85th	Robert R. Jackson	1918–1923	Republican	Redistricted to the 3rd ward in 1923		
Louis B. Anderson	1917–1933	Republican			86th	Robert R. Jackson	1918–1923	Republican	Redistricted to the 3rd ward in 1923		

=== Since 1923 ===
Since 1923, wards have been represented by a single alderman. Elections have also been nonpartisan, though officeholders often still publicly affiliate with parties.

Originally covering Douglas and its immediate surroundings, this ward has drastically moved northward to its current location across the Near North Side and West Town.

No.	Alderperson	Term in office	Party	Notes	Cite
1	Louis B. Anderson	April 16, 1923 – 1933	Republican	Had been serving since 1917	
2	William L. Dawson	1933 – April 12, 1939	Republican		
3	Earl B. Dickerson	April 12, 1939 – April 9, 1943	Democratic		
4	William H. Harvey	April 9, 1943 – December 20, 1968		Became a County Commissioner	
5	Fred D. Hubbard	March 11, 1969 – March 16, 1972		Elected in 1969 special election; seat declared vacant after disappearance	
6	William Barnett	August 15, 1972 – 1983	Democratic		
7	Bobby Rush	1983 – 1993	Democratic		
8	Madeline Haithcock	1993 – May 21, 2007	Democratic		
9	Robert Fioretti	May 21, 2007 – May 2015	Democratic		
10	Brian K. Hopkins	May 2015 – present	Democratic		
