= 1854 Chicago mayoral election =

Chicago mayoral election, 1854
- March 13, 1854
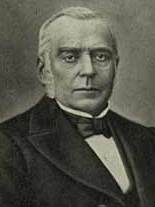

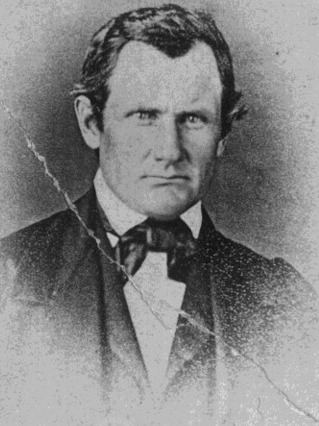
Candidate	Isaac Lawrence Milliken	Amos G. Throop
Party	Democratic	Temperance Party
Popular vote	3,800	2,556
Percentage	59.79%	40.21%
Mayor before election
Charles McNeill Gray
Democratic
Elected mayor
Isaac Lawrence Milliken
Democratic

In the 1854 Chicago mayoral election, Democrat Isaac Lawrence Milliken defeated Temperance Party nominee Amos G. Throop by a landslide 19.5% margin.

Throop had run previously in 1852.

Incumbent mayor Charles McNeill Gray did not run for reelection.

The election was held on March 13.

== Campaigning ==
Throop had the support of the city's temperance forces. Milliken supported giving Catholics a portion of the school fund and did not support temperance.

== Results ==
1854 Chicago mayoral election
Party	Candidate	Votes	%
Democratic	Isaac Lawrence Milliken	3,800	59.79
Temperance Party	Amos G. Throop	2,556	40.21
Turnout		6,356	
