= Murray F. Tuley =

American judge

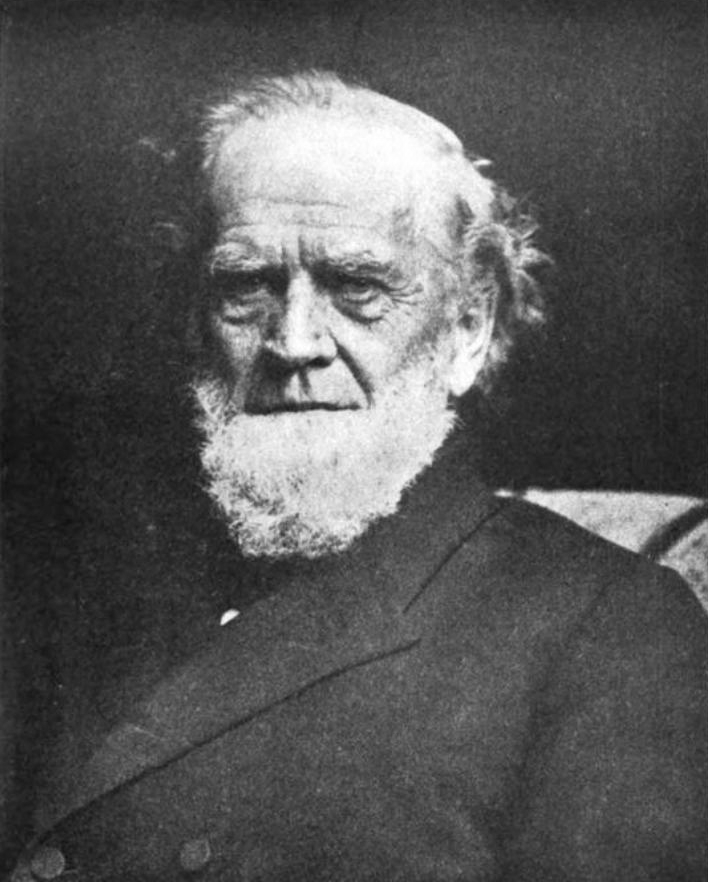

President of the Illinois State Bar Association
- In office 1902–1903

Attorney General of the New Mexico Territory
- In office ?–?

Member of the New Mexico Territorial Legislature
- In office 1852–1853

Chicago Alderman from the 1st ward
- In office 1878–1879 Serving with Daniel Kimball Pearsons
- Preceded by: John T. McAuley
- Succeeded by: Swayne Wickersham

Corporation Counsel of Chicago
- In office ?–?
- Mayor: Joseph Medill

Personal details
- Born: March 4, 1827 Louisville, Kentucky
- Died: December 25, 1905 (age 78) Pennoyer Sanitarium in Kenosha, Wisconsin
- Party: Democratic

Murray Floyd Tuley (1827–1905) was an American judge and politician.

A veteran of the Mexican–American War, Tuley became one of the best known jurists in the West. He was known as the "Nestor" of the Chicago bench. He was president of the Illinois State Bar Association 1902–1903. He was married to Katherine E. Tuley.

== Early life and career ==
Murray F. Tuley was born in Louisville, Kentucky on March 4, 1827.

After his election in 1871, Chicago Mayor Joseph Medill tasked Tuley with creating a bill to be passed in the Illinois General Assembly to revise Chicago's City Charter to expand the power of the mayor. This bill was successfully passed, and as a reward Medill appointed Tuley the city's corporation counsel.

From 1878 through 1879, Tuley served as a Chicago alderman from the 1st ward of the city. In 1879, Dunlap was an unsuccessful contender for the Democratic mayoral nomination.

The Northwest Division High School in Chicago was renamed in 1917 to Murray F. Tuley High School, after Judge Murray F. Tuley who had risen to fame not only as a judge, but as the author of the State of Illinois's Act of the Incorporation of Cities.

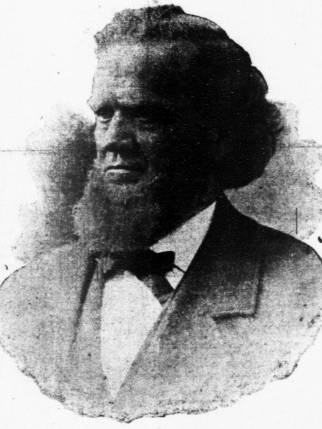
Tuley, circa 1900

M. F. Tuley owned a farm on Pine Lake which is now in Chenequa, Wisconsin. There is a spring on the property and for a period of time, he sold bottle water through the Che Ne Qua Co. His farm was later sold and Became Wilson's Chenequa Springs Hotel and was later sold to Jacob Elias Friend. This land is of historical significance because it was known muskrat hunting ground of the Prairie Potawatomi (Mashko-tens) Menomini and Chippewa Indians. The area is referred to as Tuley's Bay and also Wilson's Bay where there is reedy marsh extending from opposite the Chenequa hotel property southward across the bay to the wooded Niedecken point. The Indians called the springs, "Tkepmbes" or "springs at the lakes."

He served two years as attorney general for the New Mexico Territory, and one term in that territory's legislature.

== Personal life ==
Murray Tuley was married to Katherine E. Tuley. She also went by the names: Kate Tuley, Kate E. Tuley, Mrs. M. F. Tuley, Katherine Edmonson, and Mrs. Murray F. Tuley.

She is known for assistance in establishing kindergarten in the public school system in Chicago, Illinois. She did this through her involvement in the Chicago Women's Club of which she was a charter member. She secured aid through the Froebel Kindergarten Association. to help fund Arnold Street Free Kindergarten, May 21, 1884 and was a member of the Froebel Kindergarten Association Executive Committee.

She founded the School Children's Aid Society in 1889 after law on compulsory education was enacted.

In 1893 she was a member of Kindergarten Congress.

== Death ==
He died in the Pennoyer Sanitarium in Kenosha, Wisconsin on December 25, 1905. His death was attributed to nervous exhaustion, the result of overwork.

Tuley Park in Chicago and Tuley High School were named after Judge Tuley.
