= Daniel Kimball Pearsons =

American biblical scholar

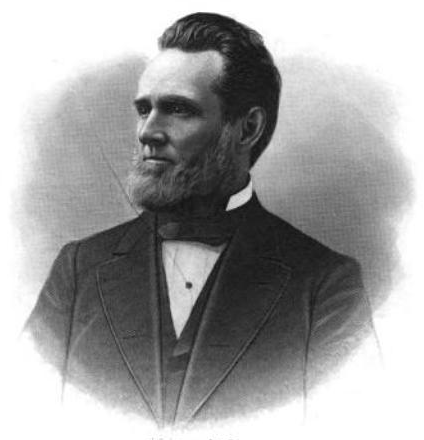

Member of the Chicago City Council from the 1st ward
- In office 1876–1879 Serving with John T. McAuley (1876–78); Murray F. Tuley (1878–79)
- Preceded by: William H. Richardson
- Succeeded by: Arthur Dixon

Personal details
- Born: April 14, 1820 Bradford, Vermont
- Died: April 27, 1912 (aged 92) Hinsdale, Illinois
- Occupation: Physician, businessman

Daniel Kimball Pearsons (April 14, 1820 – April 27, 1912) was an American physician and philanthropist.

== Biography ==
Pearsons was born in Bradford, Vermont on April 14, 1820. He graduated in medicine at Woodstock, and practiced in Chicopee, Massachusetts until 1857. He became a farmer in Ogle County, Illinois in 1857.

In 1860, he moved to Chicago, where he rapidly accumulated a large fortune in real estate. From 1876 through 1879, he served as a Chicago alderman from the city's first ward, and assisted in managing the city's financial budgets. He was best known through his large gifts to educational eleemosynary institutions, the Presbyterian Hospital of Chicago and Chicago Theological Seminary (Congregational) being especially favoured. There are few of the smaller colleges to which he did not give from $25,000 to $250,000, and his gifts ran well up into the millions.

Pearsons was a vegetarian. He ate a fruit and vegetable diet.

He died in Hinsdale, Illinois on April 27, 1912.
