= 3rd ward, Chicago =

Ward in Chicago

3rd Ward - Chicago
- Ward
- Ward 3
- Current Chicago ward map, with 3rd ward highlighted in red
- Country: United States
- State: Illinois
- County: Cook
- City: Chicago
- Established: 1837
- Communities: list

Government
  - Type: Ward
  - Body: Chicago City Council
  - Alderperson: Pat Dowell (Democratic Party)

The 3rd Ward is one of the 50 aldermanic wards with representation in the City Council of Chicago, Illinois.

== History ==
By the 1940s, the ward's demographics had become heavily African–American.

== Past alders ==
The current alderperson for the 3rd ward is Pat Dowell.

=== Before 1923 ===
Before 1923, wards were represented by two aldermen.

Aldermen					# Council	Aldermen				
Alderman	Term in office	Party	Notes	Cite	# Council	Alderman	Term in office	Party	Notes	Cite
John D. Canton	1837–1839				1st	—N/a				
John D. Canton	1837–1839				2nd	—N/a				
Ira Miltimore	1839–1842				3rd	William H. Stow	1839–1840			
Ira Miltimore	1839–1842				4th	John Gage	1840–1841			
Ira Miltimore	1839–1842				5th	William H. Stow	1841–1842			
Hamilton Barnes	1842–1843				6th	Alson S. Sherman	1842–1843		Later elected alderman again in 1849 in 5th	
Azel Peck	1843–1844				7th	Charles Taylor	1843–1844			
George Davis	1844				8th	Ira Miltimore	1844–1845	Liberty		
Hamilton Barnes	1844–1845				8th	Ira Miltimore	1844–1845	Liberty		
Francis Edwards	1845–1846				9th	Francis H. Taylor	1845–1846			
James Curtiss	1846–1847	Democratic	Previously served in 2nd ward		10th	Michael Kehoe	1846–1847			
J. Brinkerhoff	1847–1849				11th	Benjamin Wright Raymond	1847–1848			
J. Brinkerhoff	1847–1849				12th	William Jones	1848–1850			
W.H. Adams	1849–1851				13th	William Jones	1848–1850			
W.H. Adams	1849–1851				14th	S.J. Sherwood	1850–1852			
Oscar D. Wetherell	1851–1853	Republican			15th	S.J. Sherwood	1850–1852			
Oscar D. Wetherell	1851–1853	Republican			16th	O.J. Rose	1852–1854			
J.H. Gray	1853–1855				17th	O.J. Rose	1852–1854			
J.H. Gray	1853–1855				18th	William L. Church	1854–1856			
Lorenzo Fletcher	1855–1857				19th	William L. Church	1854–1856			
Lorenzo Fletcher	1855–1857				20th	Calvin DeWolf	1856–1858		Later elected alderman again in 1866 in 2nd ward	
Hiram Joy	1857–1859				21st	Calvin DeWolf	1856–1858		Later elected alderman again in 1866 in 2nd ward	
Hiram Joy	1857–1859				22nd	Levi J. North	1858–1860			
Fernando Jones	1859–1861				23rd	Levi J. North	1858–1860			
Fernando Jones	1859–1861				24th	Hiram Joy	1860–1862			
A.D. Titsworth	1861–1863		Redistricted to 2nd ward in 1863		25th	Hiram Joy	1860–1862			
A.D. Titsworth	1861–1863		Redistricted to 2nd ward in 1863		26th	James Hahn	1862–1863		Redistricted to 1st in 1863	
James H. Roberts	1863–1865				27th	Stephen Barrett	1863–1868		Died in office	
James H. Roberts	1863–1865				28th	Stephen Barrett	1863–1868		Died in office	
Charles G. Wicker	1865–1869		Later elected alderman again in 1872 in 13th ward		29th	Stephen Barrett	1863–1868		Died in office	
Charles G. Wicker	1865–1869		Later elected alderman again in 1872 in 13th ward		30th	Stephen Barrett	1863–1868		Died in office	
Charles G. Wicker	1865–1869		Later elected alderman again in 1872 in 13th ward		31st	Stephen Barrett	1863–1868		Died in office	
Charles G. Wicker	1865–1869		Later elected alderman again in 1872 in 13th ward		32nd	Stephen Barrett	1863–1868		Died in office	
Charles G. Wicker	1865–1869		Later elected alderman again in 1872 in 13th ward		32nd	James Hahn	1868–1870		Previously served in 1st and 3rd wards	
Charles G. Wicker	1865–1869		Later elected alderman again in 1872 in 13th ward		33rd	James Hahn	1868–1870		Previously served in 1st and 3rd wards	
Joseph A. Montgomery	1869–1871	Democratic			34th	James Hahn	1868–1870		Previously served in 1st and 3rd wards	
Joseph A. Montgomery	1869–1871	Democratic			35th	David Coey	1870–1876			
John W. McGenniss	1871–1873				36th	David Coey	1870–1876			
John W. McGenniss	1871–1873				37th	David Coey	1870–1876			
William Fitzgerald	1873–1876				38th	David Coey	1870–1876			
William Fitzgerald	1873–1876				39th	David Coey	1870–1876			
William Aldrich	1876–1877	Republican			40th	John L. Thompson	1876–1878			
Eugene Cary	1877–1879	Republican			41st	John L. Thompson	1876–1878			
Eugene Cary	1877–1879	Republican			42nd	O.B. Phelps	1878–1880	Republican		
John M. Clark	1879–1881	Republican			43rd	O.B. Phelps	1878–1880	Republican		
John M. Clark	1879–1881	Republican			44th	Daniel Lewis Shorey	1880–1886	Republican		
O.B. Phelps	1881–1883	Republican			45th	Daniel Lewis Shorey	1880–1886	Republican		
O.B. Phelps	1881–1883	Republican			46th	Daniel Lewis Shorey	1880–1886	Republican		
Frank Follansbee	1883–1885	Republican			47th	Daniel Lewis Shorey	1880–1886	Republican		
Frank Follansbee	1883–1885	Republican			48th	Daniel Lewis Shorey	1880–1886	Republican		
Charles W. Drew	1885–1887	Republican			49th	Daniel Lewis Shorey	1880–1886	Republican		
Charles W. Drew	1885–1887	Republican			50th	David H. Gile	1886–1888	Republican		
John H. Hamline	1887–1888	Republican	Redistricted to 2nd ward in 1888		51st	David H. Gile	1886–1888	Republican		
—N/a					52nd	Anson Gorton	1888–1892			
Laban B. Dixon	1889–1893				53rd	Anson Gorton	1888–1892			
Laban B. Dixon	1889–1893				54th	Anson Gorton	1888–1892			
Laban B. Dixon	1889–1893				55th	Anson Gorton	1888–1892			
Laban B. Dixon	1889–1893				56th	Edward Marrenner	1892–1896	Republican		
Eli E. Smith	1893–1895				57th	Edward Marrenner	1892–1896	Republican		
Eli E. Smith	1893–1895				58th	Edward Marrenner	1892–1896	Republican		
Noble Brandon Judah Sr.	1895–1897				59th	Edward Marrenner	1892–1896	Republican		
Noble Brandon Judah Sr.	1895–1897				60th	Henry S. Fitch	1896–1900			
Charles Alling	1897–1901		Redistricted to 2nd ward in 1901		61st	Henry S. Fitch	1896–1900			
Charles Alling	1897–1901		Redistricted to 2nd ward in 1901		62nd	Henry S. Fitch	1896–1900			
Charles Alling	1897–1901		Redistricted to 2nd ward in 1901		63rd	Henry S. Fitch	1896–1900			
Charles Alling	1897–1901		Redistricted to 2nd ward in 1901		64th	Thomas J. Dixon	1900–1901	Republican	Redistricted to 2nd ward in 1901	
Milton J. Foreman	1901–1911	Republican	Redistricted from 4th ward		65th	William S. Jackson	1901–1904		Redistricted from 4th ward	
Milton J. Foreman	1901–1911	Republican	Redistricted from 4th ward		66th	William S. Jackson	1901–1904		Redistricted from 4th ward	
Milton J. Foreman	1901–1911	Republican	Redistricted from 4th ward		67th	William S. Jackson	1901–1904		Redistricted from 4th ward	
Milton J. Foreman	1901–1911	Republican	Redistricted from 4th ward		68th	William J. Pringle	1904–1912			
Milton J. Foreman	1901–1911	Republican	Redistricted from 4th ward		69th	William J. Pringle	1904–1912			
Milton J. Foreman	1901–1911	Republican	Redistricted from 4th ward		70th	William J. Pringle	1904–1912			
Milton J. Foreman	1901–1911	Republican	Redistricted from 4th ward		71st	William J. Pringle	1904–1912			
Milton J. Foreman	1901–1911	Republican	Redistricted from 4th ward		72nd	William J. Pringle	1904–1912			
Milton J. Foreman	1901–1911	Republican	Redistricted from 4th ward		73rd	William J. Pringle	1904–1912			
Milton J. Foreman	1901–1911	Republican	Redistricted from 4th ward		74th	William J. Pringle	1904–1912			
Albert R. Tearney	1911–1912				75th	William J. Pringle	1904–1912			
Albert R. Tearney	1911–1912				76th	Simon D. Mayer	1912–1914			
Thomas D. Nash	1913–1915	Democratic			77th	Simon D. Mayer	1912–1914			
Thomas D. Nash	1913–1915	Democratic			78th	Jacob Lindheimer	1914–1915			
Edward J. Werner	1915–1917	Republican			79th	Nathaniel R. Stern	1915–1916	Republican		
Edward J. Werner	1915–1917	Republican			80th	Ulysses S. Schwartz	1916–1923	Democratic	Continued as alderman after 1923, but redistricted to 4th ward	
George F. Iliff	1917–1919	Democratic			81st	Ulysses S. Schwartz	1916–1923	Democratic	Continued as alderman after 1923, but redistricted to 4th ward	
George F. Iliff	1917–1919	Democratic			82nd	Ulysses S. Schwartz	1916–1923	Democratic	Continued as alderman after 1923, but redistricted to 4th ward	
John H. Passmore	1919–1921				83rd	Ulysses S. Schwartz	1916–1923	Democratic	Continued as alderman after 1923, but redistricted to 4th ward	
John H. Passmore	1919–1921				84th	Ulysses S. Schwartz	1916–1923	Democratic	Continued as alderman after 1923, but redistricted to 4th ward	
John H. Johntry	1921–1923				85th	Ulysses S. Schwartz	1916–1923	Democratic	Continued as alderman after 1923, but redistricted to 4th ward	
John H. Johntry	1921–1923				86th	Ulysses S. Schwartz	1916–1923	Democratic	Continued as alderman after 1923, but redistricted to 4th ward	

=== Since 1923 ===
Since 1923, wards have been represented by a single alderman. Elections have also been nonpartisan, though officeholders often still publicly affiliate with parties.

Alderperson	Term in office	Party	Notes	Cite
Robert R. Jackson	April 16, 1923 – April 12, 1939	Republican	Had been serving then-2nd ward since 1918	
Benjamin A. Grant	April 12, 1939 – April 9, 1943	Democratic	Lost re-election	
Oscar Stanton De Priest	April 9, 1943 – 1947	Republican	Had previously served then-2nd ward from 1915 to 1917	
Archibald Carey Jr.	1947 – 1955	Republican		
Ralph Metcalfe	1955 – December 1970	Democratic	Resigned in order to take office as a U.S. congressman	
Tyrone T. Kenner	February 23, 1971 – February 11, 1985			
Dorothy Tillman	February 11, 1985 – April 27, 2007	Democratic		
Pat Dowell	April 27, 2007 – Present	Democratic		
