= Adolph Marks (politician) =

American lawyer and state senator (1867–1933)

Member of the Illinois Senate (1st District)
- In office 1920–1930
- Preceded by: Francis P. Brady
- Succeeded by: Daniel Serritella

Personal details
- Born: 1867 Chicago, Illinois, U.S.
- Died: February 21, 1933 (aged 65–66) Chicago, Illinois, U.S.
- Party: Republican

Adolph Marks (1867 – February 21, 1933) was an American lawyer and state senator in Illinois. He was elected to fill a seat left vacant in the Illinois Senate and re-elected in 1922. He was a Republican. He represented the First Senatorial District. His re-election was close, punctuated by a recount that showed Marks had won the seat by 63 votes. While in office Marks and Samuel Ettelson tried to pressure Al Capone not to go through with a plan to take over policy rackets in Chicago's Ward 2.

In 1930, Marks lost the Republican nomination for State Senate to Daniel Serritella, City Superintendent of Streets and henchman of Al Capone.

Marks was born in Chicago. He succeeded Francis P. Brady.

Marks died in Chicago on February 21, 1933, at the age of 66.
