= Thomas J. Dixon =

American politician and businessman

Arthur Dixon
- portrait of Dixon, circa 1907

Member of the Chicago City Council
- In office 1900–1910 Serving with Charles Alling (1900–1905); William Hale Thompson (1901–1902); George F. Harding Jr. (1905–1910)
- Preceded by: Henry S. Fitch
- Succeeded by: Wilson Shufelt (Note: Shufelt was his successor in 2nd ward; his successor in the 3rd ward (after redirecting) had been William S. Jackson)
- Constituency: 3rd ward (1900–1901); 2nd ward (1901–1910)

Personal details
- Born: September 9, 1869 Chicago, Illinois
- Died: March 4, 1939 (aged 69) Oak Park, Illinois
- Party: Republican
- Parents: Arthur Dixon (father); Annie Carson (mother)
- Occupation: transferer; bank director

Thomas John Dixon (September 9, 1869–March 4, 1939) was an American politician and businessman. An executive of the Arthur Dixon Transfer Company, he also served as a member of the Chicago City Council.

== Early life, family, career ==
Dixon was born September 9, 1869, a son of Arthur Dixon and Annie Dixon (née Carson). His parents were considered early pioneers of Chicago. He was the younger brother of George William Dixon. He was of paternal Ulster Scot ancestry, making him a Scotch-Irish American.

Dixon followed his father into the transfer industry, serving as vice president and director of the Arthur Dixon Transfer Company.

== Chicago City Council ==
Dixon served as a Republican member of the Chicago City Council from 1900 through 1910. He was elected to the council in 1900, initially representing the 3rd ward.

In 1901, Dixon was redistricted to the 2nd ward. The 1901 redistricting resulted in two "holdover" council members (Dixon and William Hale Thompson) being drawn into the ward. Thus, from 1901 through 1902, the ward was temporary represented by three aldermen (Dixon, Thompson, and the 1901-elected Charles Alling). Dixon represented the ward until 1910. He was considered to be very well-liked by voters of the ward.

Dixon was an Illinois delegate to the 1904 Republican National Convention.

== Personal life ==
Dixon was a member of the Union League Club of Chicago. He was a thirty-sixth degree freemason, a shriner and a knight templar. He was also member of the Chicago Traffic Association, Chicago Athletic Association, and Chicago Rotary Club. Dixon was a wealthy individual.

Dixon and his wife, Dora, had five adult children: daughters Alice and Dora, and sons Thomas Jr., Arthur, and Wesley. By 1922, he and his wife had moved from their former residence on Calumet Avenue in Chicago to a residence in the suburb of Oak Park.

Dixon died of heart disease at the age of 69 on March 4, 1909, passing at his personal residence on Linden Avenue in Oak Park. His funeral was held at the First Methodist in Oak Park.
