= Francis P. Brady =

American politician

Member of the Illinois Senate (1st District)
- In office 1918–1920
- Succeeded by: Adolph Marks

Member of the Illinois Senate (1st District)
- In office 1910–1914
- Succeeded by: George F. Harding Jr.

Member of the Illinois House of Representatives
- In office 1904–1910

Personal details
- Born: 1870 Albany, New York
- Died: March 28, 1926 (aged 55–56)
- Party: Republican

Francis P. Brady was an American politician who served as a member of the Illinois Senate and the Illinois House of Representatives.

Brady was born in 1870 in Albany, New York and moved to Chicago as a child in 1887. He was first elected to the Illinois House of Representatives in 1904 and reelected in 1906 and 1908. He was elected to the Illinois Senate in 1910 representing the 1st District in Cook County where he served until 1914. He was succeeded by Republican George F. Harding Jr. He was reelected to the Illinois Senate, 1st District in 1918 but resigned in 1920 to serve as clerk of the Appellate Court in the 1st District. He died on March 28, 1926.
