= Proco Joe Moreno =

American politician

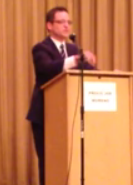

Member of the Chicago City Council from the 1st ward
- In office March 26, 2010 – May 20, 2019
- Preceded by: Manny Flores
- Succeeded by: Daniel La Spata

Personal details
- Born: Proco Joe Moreno III; May 19, 1972 (age 54) Moline, Illinois, U.S.
- Party: Democratic
- Education: Augustana College (BA); DePaul University (MBA)

Proco Joe Moreno III (born May 19, 1972) is an American politician who served as alderman from the 1st ward in the Chicago City Council. He was appointed to replace Manny Flores on March 26, 2010. His term ended on May 20, 2019, after his loss to Daniel La Spata in the 2019 Chicago aldermanic elections. The 1st Ward of Chicago incorporates areas including: Wicker Park, Bucktown, East Village, Ukrainian Village, Logan Square and the southeastern tip of Roscoe Village.

== Early life and education ==
Moreno was born in Moline, Illinois, and moved to Chicago after graduating from Augustana College, with a B.A. in Business and Art. Moreno has an M.B.A. from DePaul University and was vice president at a printing company before becoming Alderman. Moreno graduated from the Metropolitan Leadership Institute of United Neighborhood Organization (UNO), which seeks to develop political leaders within the Hispanic community.

== Political career ==
In 2008, Moreno ran in the Democratic primary election against incumbent Illinois State Senator Willie Delgado in District 2 and lost.

=== Chicago City Council ===
After 1st ward alderman Manny Flores was appointed by then Gov. Pat Quinn to lead the Illinois Commerce Commission, Chicago Mayor Richard Daley appointed Moreno to fill the rest of his term as alderman in March 2010.

Moreno won his first full term in the February 22, 2011, Chicago municipal elections, after receiving the endorsements of the Chicago Tribune and Chicago Sun-Times. It was during this term that Moreno attempted to block a Chick-fil-a chicken restaurant from being built in his ward due to the company's political views. Moreno demanded the company change its discriminatory policies while critics questioned his commitment to free speech, religious liberties and the first amendment.

Moreno's bid for a second full term proved to be a greater challenge than his first, as he drew three challengers: Anne Shaw, an attorney; Andrew Hamilton, also an attorney; and Ronda Locke, a former staffer to the Alderman. Moreno won the election with over 51% overall vote.

In 2019, Moreno lost to political newcomer Daniel La Spata.

== Chick-fil-A and gay marriage ==
In July 2012, Moreno said he denied the fast-food chain Chick-fil-A a permit to open a restaurant on North Elston Avenue. His stated reason was because the company's president held different beliefs on gay marriage (opposition) than Moreno. In September of that year, Moreno said he spoke to Chick-fil-A executives and that they told him they would distribute a "statement of tolerance" to their employees and operators.

After speaking with the executives, Moreno said he would allow Chick-fil-A to open the restaurant. Later in October, Moreno again said he would block the permit after saying he heard the company president state on cable TV that the company's policies on gay marriage have not changed.

== Controversies and scandals ==
In May 2017, Moreno was caught on video threatening a property owner with zoning changes after a rent dispute at the former Double Door nightclub.

In June 2018, Moreno was accused of impersonating a police officer after flashing the badge distributed to aldermen as “peace officers” to compel a woman to move her car, so he could take the parking spot in the Wrigleyville neighborhood.

In January 2019, the Chicago Police Department opened an investigation into whether Moreno filed a false police report. Moreno had reported his car was stolen, and police found the car and arrested the woman behind the wheel. However, she had proof that Moreno had loaned her the car, with text messages to back up her story.

On May 14, 2019, Moreno turned himself in to local authorities after a warrant was issued for his arrest, reportedly for filing a false police report and for insurance fraud. He pleaded "not guilty" to the charges in June 2019.

In February 2019, a former staffer accused Moreno of inappropriate behavior. She said in 2015 Moreno said to her and other aides, “OK, we’re gonna have a contest. Everyone’s gonna have to take off their shirts. The girls can keep their bras on. And if your body is better than mine, then you get a raise.”

Moreno's name came up in the federal investigation of Ald. Ed Burke and Ald. Danny Solis, when a campaign donor said Moreno had steered property zoning tax work his way in exchange for support.

In December 2020, Chicago police reported that Moreno had sideswiped eight cars over four street blocks.

In 2021 he pleaded guilty to filing a false report.

== Electoral history ==
Illinois 2nd State Senate District Primary Election, 2008
Party	Candidate	Votes	%
Democratic	William "Willie" Delgado	14,653	59.57
Democratic	Proco "Joe" Moreno	9,945	40.43
Total votes		24,598	100

Chicago 1st ward aldermanic general election, 2011
Party	Candidate	Votes	%
Nonpartisan	Proco "Joe" Moreno (incumbent)	7,243	73.56
Nonpartisan	Deborah Lopez	2,147	21.80
Nonpartisan	Ronald J. Baltierra	457	4.67
Total votes		9,847	100

Chicago 1st ward aldermanic general election, 2015
Party	Candidate	Votes	%
Nonpartisan	Proco "Joe" Moreno (incumbent)	4,205	51.08
Nonpartisan	Anne Shaw	2,037	24.74
Nonpartisan	Ronda Locke	1,680	20.41
Nonpartisan	Andrew Hamilton	310	3.77
Total votes		8,232	100

Chicago 1st ward aldermanic general election, 2019
Party	Candidate	Votes	%
Nonpartisan	Daniel La Spata	7,326	61.25
Nonpartisan	Proco "Joe" Moreno (incumbent)	4,635	38.75
Total votes		11,961	100
