= Daniel La Spata =

American politician

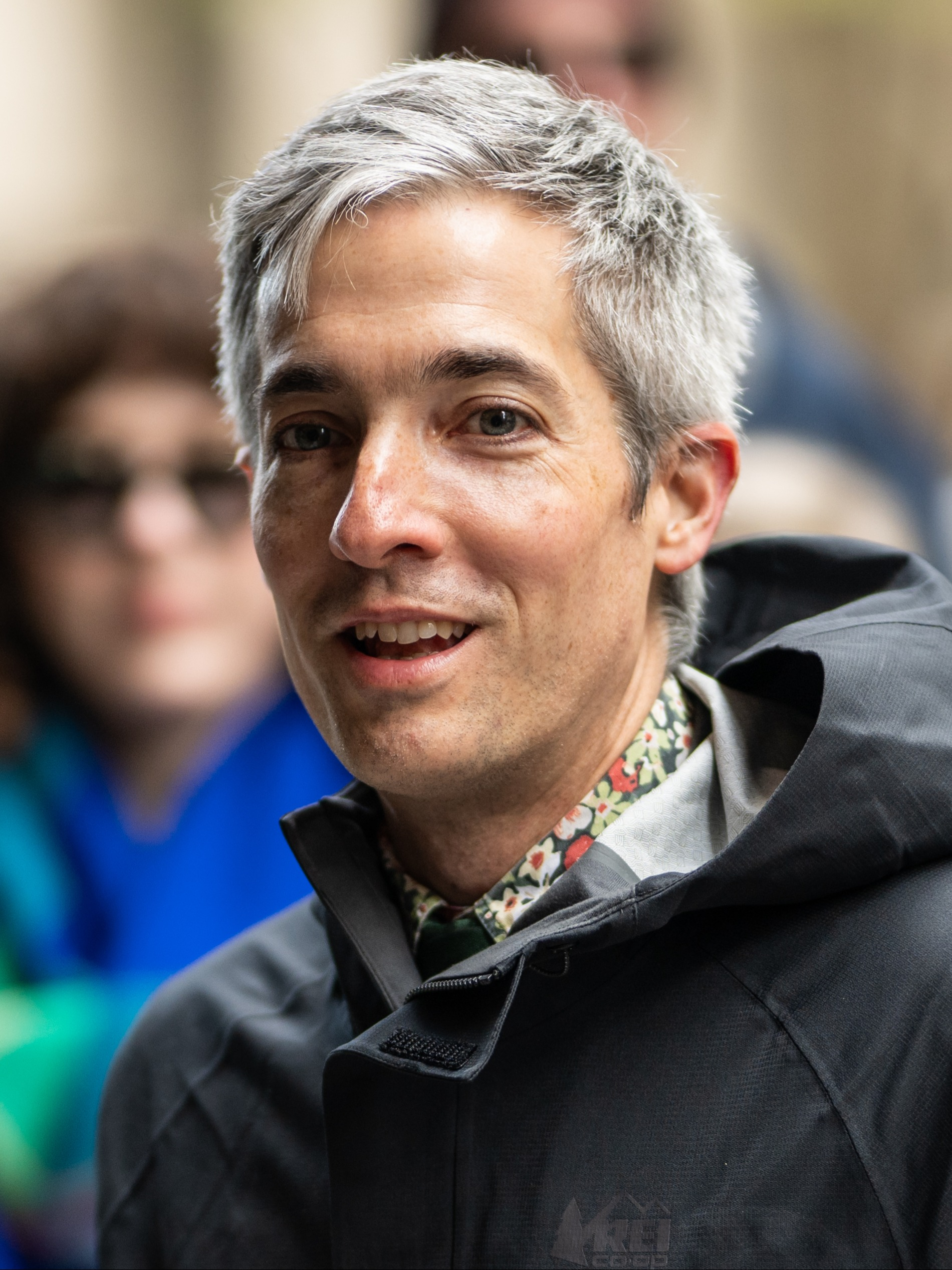

Member of the Chicago City Council from the 1st ward
- Incumbent
- Assumed office May 20, 2019
- Preceded by: Proco Joe Moreno

Personal details
- Born: February 26, 1981 (age 45) South Plainfield, New Jersey, U.S.
- Party: Democratic
- Education: North Park University (BA); University of Illinois at Chicago (MUP)

Daniel Francis La Spata (born February 26, 1981) is a Chicago politician. He has served as alderman from Chicago's 1st ward since May 2019. He won election to that office after defeating incumbent Proco Joe Moreno in the 2019 Chicago aldermanic elections. He is a member of the Democratic Socialists of America.

== Early life, education, and career ==
La Spata was born in South Plainfield, New Jersey, in 1981. He graduated in 1999 from South Plainfield High School. He moved to Chicago in 1999 to attend the private North Park University, where he later received a bachelor's degree in psychology and music. In 2019, he received a Master of Urban Planning and Policy from the University of Illinois Chicago.

He was a member of the Logan Square Neighborhood Association for 10 years, including a stint as vice-president, where he worked on issues of equitable housing and community development. He has also worked as a community organizer for the Jane Addams Seniors Caucus, a policy and planning associate at Friends of the Parks, and policy intern at the Center for Tax and Budget Accountability.

In the 2019 Chicago aldermanic elections, La Spata ran for alderman of the 1st ward, challenging incumbent Proco Joe Moreno. He received endorsements from local community organization The People's Lobby and state representative Will Guzzardi. In February 2019, a photograph reportedly from his 2013 bachelor party was released in which La Spata, dressed in a banana costume and with his friends surrounding him in monkey masks, posed with four African-American boys at a downtown Chicago park. Following criticism of the photo as racist, La Spata issued an apology stating "I apologize unequivocally for the photo from my bachelor party six years ago." On February 29, 2019, he won election to the seat after defeating Moreno with 61.3% of the vote.

On April 10, 2019, La Spata joined six other newly elected socialist members of the City Council in protesting against the approval of tax increment financing for the Lincoln Yards and The 78 real estate developments.

== Chicago City Council (2019–present) ==
La Spata was sworn in as alderman from the 1st ward on May 20, 2019. He is a member of the Progressive Caucus and Socialist Caucus within City Council.

In November 2019, La Spata was one of eleven aldermen to vote against Mayor Lori Lightfoot's first budget. He joined all five other members of the Socialist Caucus in signing a letter to Lightfoot which criticized her budget for "an over-reliance on property taxes" and "regressive funding models" that are "burdensome to our working-class citizens, while giving the wealthy and large corporations a pass."

La Spata has advocated for Chicago to altogether end its contract with Commonwealth Edison.

== Electoral history ==
Chicago 1st ward aldermanic general election, 2019
Party	Candidate	Votes	%
Nonpartisan	Daniel La Spata	7,281	61.27
Nonpartisan	Proco Joe Moreno	4,602	38.73
Total votes		11,883	100.00

Chicago 1st ward aldermanic general election, 2023
Party	Candidate	Votes	%
Nonpartisan	Daniel La Spata (incumbent)	7,339	50.1
Nonpartisan	Sam Royko	3,432	23.4
Nonpartisan	Andy Schneider	2,877	19.6
Nonpartisan	Proco Joe Moreno	999	6.8
Total votes		14,647	100.0

== See also ==
- List of Chicago alderpersons since 1923
- List of Democratic Socialists of America who have held office in the United States
