= The Curators of Dixon School =

- Directed by: Pamela Sherrod Anderson
- Produced by: Pamela Sherrod Anderson; Ines Sommer
- Cinematography: Ines Sommer
- Production company: Cow Lamp Films
- Release date: 2012
- Running time: 80 minutes
- Country: United States
- Language: English

The Curators of Dixon School is a 2012 documentary directed, co-produced, and written by Pamela Sherrod Anderson about the art collection at Arthur Dixon Elementary School in Chatham, Chicago.

The documentary highlights the school's over 200-piece art collection, which has African-American themes. The film also discusses former principal Joan Dameron Crisler, who established the program. The end credits discuss the impact of budget cuts from the Chicago Public Schools on the art program.

Anderson stated that the impetus to make the documentary began when, at a dinner party, an author of a book about African-American art suggested that she visit the school.

It was screened at the Gene Siskel Film Center in Chicago on November 29, 2012.

Halie Sekoff of the Huffington Post stated "The film is sure to spark a dialogue about the place of “Dixon-models” in the United States, a conversation Anderson and her co-producers are eager to ignite."
