= Arthur Dixon (footballer, born 1887) =

English footballer

Personal information
- Full name: William Armour Dixon
- Date of birth: February 1887
- Place of birth: Newcastle upon Tyne, England
- Date of death: 1964 (aged 76–77)
- Height: 5 ft 9 in (1.75 m)
- Position: Outside left

Senior career*
Years	Team	Apps	(Gls)
- Willington Athletic
–	Crawcrook Villa		
–	Newcastle City		
1908–1910	Fulham	1	(0)
1910–1921	Plymouth Argyle	186	(42)
1921–1922	Barrow	4	(0)
- * Club domestic league appearances and goals

William Armour Dixon (February 1887 – 1964), known as Will Dixon or Arthur Dixon, was an English professional footballer who played in the Football League for Fulham, Plymouth Argyle and Barrow. He played as an outside left.

Dixon was born in Newcastle upon Tyne, and played local football in that area before joining Fulham. He made his Football League debut for that club during the 1908–09 season, but that was his only League appearance. He moved to Plymouth Argyle, then a Southern League club, in 1910, and made nearly 200 appearances for the club either side of the First World War. Dixon played in Argyle's first game in the Football League, as the Southern League Division One clubs were absorbed to form the Football League Third Division for the 1920–21 season, and was involved in the buildup to their first Football League goal, scored by Jimmy Heeps. He finished his League career the following season with four games for Barrow in the newly formed Third Division North.

Dixon's brothers Andrew and Joseph were also on Argyle's books, but never appeared for the first team. Dixon died in 1964.
