= Anti-Nebraska movement =

1854–55 American anti-slavery movement

The Anti-Nebraska movement was a political alignment in the United States formed in opposition to the Kansas–Nebraska Act of 1854 and to its repeal of the Missouri Compromise provision forbidding slavery in U.S. territories north of latitude 36°30'. At the time, the name "Nebraska" could loosely refer to areas west of the Missouri River. The Republican Party grew out of the Anti-Nebraska movement.

== History ==
Most in the anti-Nebraska movement considered the Kansas–Nebraska Act to be a unilateral pro-Southern revision to the supposedly final Compromise of 1850, and a nefarious violation of the terms of the Missouri Compromise. Many were deeply alarmed by the prospect of new slave states being established in northern areas formerly reserved for free white settlers. The issue of not extending slavery into new areas was different from the issue of abolishing slavery in areas where it already existed, and only a minority of Kansas-Nebraska act opponents were abolitionists in the strict sense.

The first prominent public manifestation of opposition to the act was the Appeal of the Independent Democrats in January 1854. This was followed by locally organized "anti-Nebraska" meetings in many parts of the United States. Supporters included members of the Free Soil Party, Conscience Whigs, and anti-slavery Democrats. Some were seeking to organize a new political party devoted to anti-slavery-extension principles, while others did not intend to repudiate their existing political affiliations, but merely wished to ally with those of diverse political views on the single issue of opposing the Kansas-Nebraska Act.

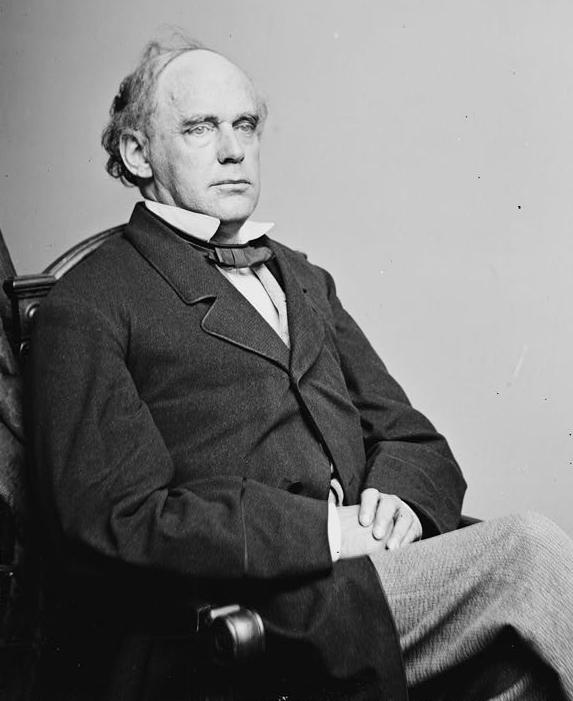
Salmon P. Chase

Opinion against the expansion of slavery continued to be politically important in the North after the Kansas-Nebraska Act was passed in May 1854 (reinforced when Kansas under the Act became "Bleeding Kansas"). Simultaneously, the Whig Party was disintegrating at the national level, and there was competition between those who wished to take advantage of this situation to organize a major new party based on anti-slavery-extension principles, and those who wished to organize a new party based on anti-immigration and anti-Catholicism. At first in many areas the "American Party" or Know-Nothings seemed to benefit most from the dissolution of the Whigs, but after various complicated political maneuverings (sometimes involving local "fusion ticket" alliances), by 1856 the anti-slavery Republican Party, the organized successor to the anti-Nebraska movement, was one of the two largest parties in the United States (see 1856 United States presidential election).

Salmon P. Chase was one of the prominent figures in the anti-Nebraska movement. Abraham Lincoln re-entered politics as a result of the Kansas-Nebraska Act and was a prominent local anti-Nebraska speaker in central Illinois.

== See also ==
- History of the Republican Party
- 1855–56 Speaker of the United States House of Representatives election
- 1856 Chicago mayoral election – the two candidates in this election ran as "pro-Nebraska" and "anti-Nebraska"
