= Beauregard Moseley =

American politician

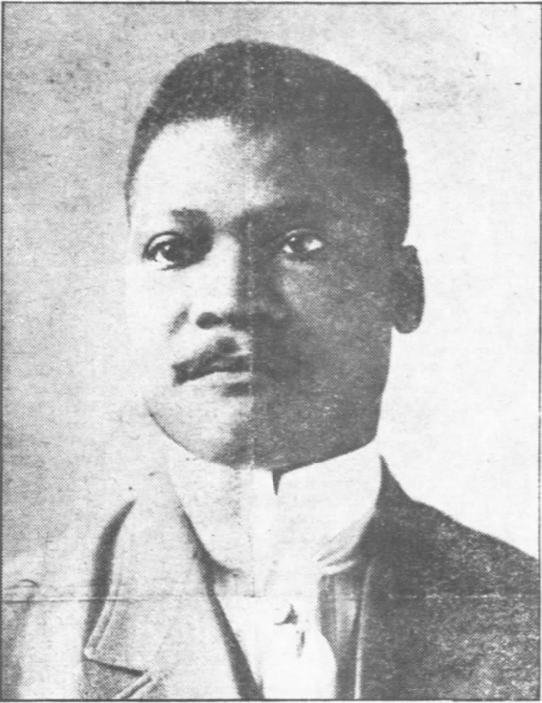

Beauregard Fitzhugh Moseley (Note: In some sources his name was spelt Mosely.) (1868 - December 1, 1919) was an African-American lawyer, mayor, community leader, baseball team co-founder and executive in Chicago. He and Robert R. Jackson founded the Leland Giants.

He was born 1868 in Lincolnton, Georgia where he also received a basic education. He taught in schools for a number of years before moving to New Orleans where he studied law and became engaged with politics.

He married Miss Carrie Hammond with whom he had two children in New Orleans and two more in Chicago. They had moved from New Orleans to Montreal in 1891 before moving to the warmer climate of Chicago.

Moseley started a newspaper called the Weekly Republic in Chicago which he published until September 1, 1898 when he was admitted to the bar for both Illinois and federal courts. He started his own law practice in Englewood, Chicago with a mostly white clientele and was successful enough to build a new home for his family and buy other property.

He was elected the first mayor of the Idlewild, Michigan which was a new African-American vacation location.

Moseley helped co-found the Leland Giants baseball club.

He died December 1, 1919 at Fort Dearborn Hospital after catching influenza. He was survived by his wife Carrie Moseley and a daughter who were both present when he passed.
