= Arthur Dixon (Chicago alderman) =

American politician

- portrait of Dixon, circa 1900

President of the Chicago City Council
- In office 1874–1880

Member of the Chicago City Council
- In office 1879–1891 Serving with Swayne Wickersham (1879–1884); William P. Whelan (1884–90); Nicholas A. Cremer (1890–91)
- Preceded by: Daniel Kimball Pearsons
- Succeeded by: John R. Morris
- Constituency: 1st ward
- In office 1867–1875 Serving with Calvin DeWolf (1866–68); P.M. Donnellan (1868–70); Joseph E. Otis (1870–72)/ Francis W. Warren (1872–76)
- Preceded by: William H. Carter
- Succeeded by: Addison Ballard
- Constituency: 2nd ward

Member of the Illinois House of Representatives from the 96th district
- In office 1871–1873

Personal details
- Born: March 27, 1837 County Fermanagh, Ireland
- Died: October 26, 1917 (aged 80) Chicago, Illinois
- Party: Republican
- Spouse: Annie Carson (m. 1862)
- Children: George William Dixon; Thomas J. Dixon
- Parents: Arthur Dixon (father); Jane Allen (mother)
- Occupation: grocer; transferer; bank director; railway director

Arthur Dixon (March 27, 1837 – October 26, 1917) of Chicago, Ireland, was an alderman in the Chicago city council from 1867 to 1875 (representing the 2nd ward) and 1879 to 1891 (representing the 1st ward), as well as a member of the Illinois House of Representatives

== Early life ==
Dixon was born on March 27, 1837 in County Fermanagh, Ireland (which is, today, located in Northern Ireland) The son of the elder Arthur Dixon and Jane Dixon (née Allen), he was of Scotch-Irish (Ulster Scot) ancestry.

== Business career ==
In the United States city of Chicago, Dixon worked in the grocery and transfer industries, becoming a millionaire.

Dixon served as a corporate executive and corporate board member for several companies. From 1900 through 1917, he was a director of both the Baltimore & Ohio Railroad and the Chicago & Grand Trunk Railway. He was also a director of the Metropolitan National Bank.

== Political career ==
Chicago Tribune illustration of Dixon (right) at the 1888 Cook County Republican Party convention

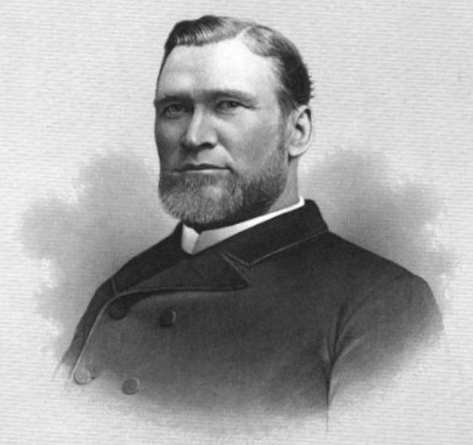
illustration of Dixon, circa 1880s

Dixon, a member of the Republican Party, held elected office in Chicago for many decades.

Dixon served as an alderman on the Chicago City Council from 1867 to 1875 (representing the 2nd ward) and 1879 to 1891 (representing the 1st ward). He served as president of the council from 1874 through 1880. While an alderman, Dixon earned a reputation for being the "watch-dog of the city treasury".

Overlapping with his first term on the city council, Dixon was a member of the Illinois House of Representatives, representing the 96th district from 1871 through 1873.

Dixon was an alternate delegate from Illinois for the 1880 Republican National Convention. In 1904, Dixon was a Republican presidential elector from Illinois, serving as a member of the 1904 Electoral College after the Republican ticket won the 1904 presidential vote in Illinois.

== Personal life, death, legacy ==
Dixon was a methodist. He was a freemason, a shriner, and a knight templar. He was also a member of the Union League Club of Chicago.

In 1862, Dixon married Annie Carson. Together, they had sons George William Dixon and Thomas J. Dixon –both of whom had careers in business and Chicago Republican politics.

Dixon died in Chicago on October 26, 1917. Arthur Dixon Elementary School (operated by Chicago Public Schools) is named for Dixon.
