= Amos G. Throop =

American politician (1811–1894)

Amos Gager Throop
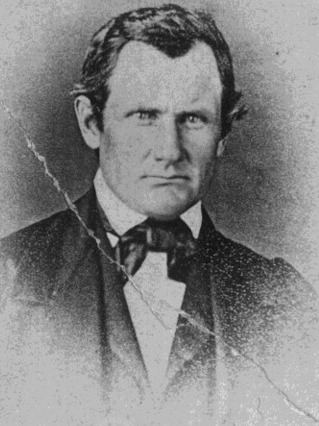
- Throop in 1840

3rd Mayor of Pasadena
- In office 1888–1890
- Preceded by: M. M. Parker
- Succeeded by: T. P. Lukens

City Treasurer of Chicago
- In office 1865–1867
- Preceded by: David Allen Gage
- Succeeded by: William F. Wentworth

Chicago Alderman
- In office 1876–1880 Serving with J. G. Briggs (1876–1877); Ansel B. Cooke (1877–1879); George Bell Swift (1879–1880)
- Preceded by: George E. White
- Succeeded by: Thomas N. Bond
- Constituency: 11th ward
- In office 1849–1853 Serving with Robert H. Foss (1849–1852); Charles McDonnell (1852–1853)
- Preceded by: Charles McDonnell
- Succeeded by: William Kennedy
- Constituency: 4th

Personal details
- Born: Amos Gager Throop; July 22, 1811 DeRuyter, New York, U.S.
- Died: March 22, 1894 (aged 82) Pasadena, California, U.S.
- Party: Temperance

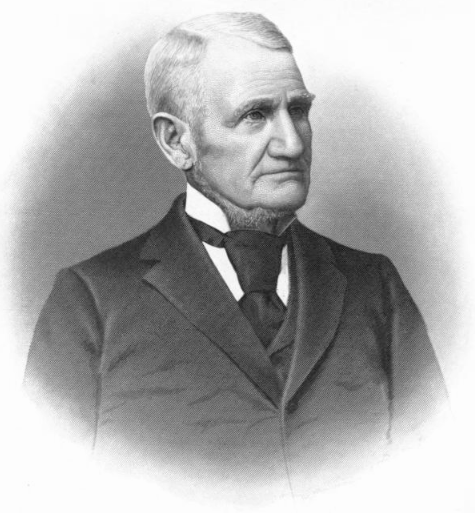
Throop c. 1894

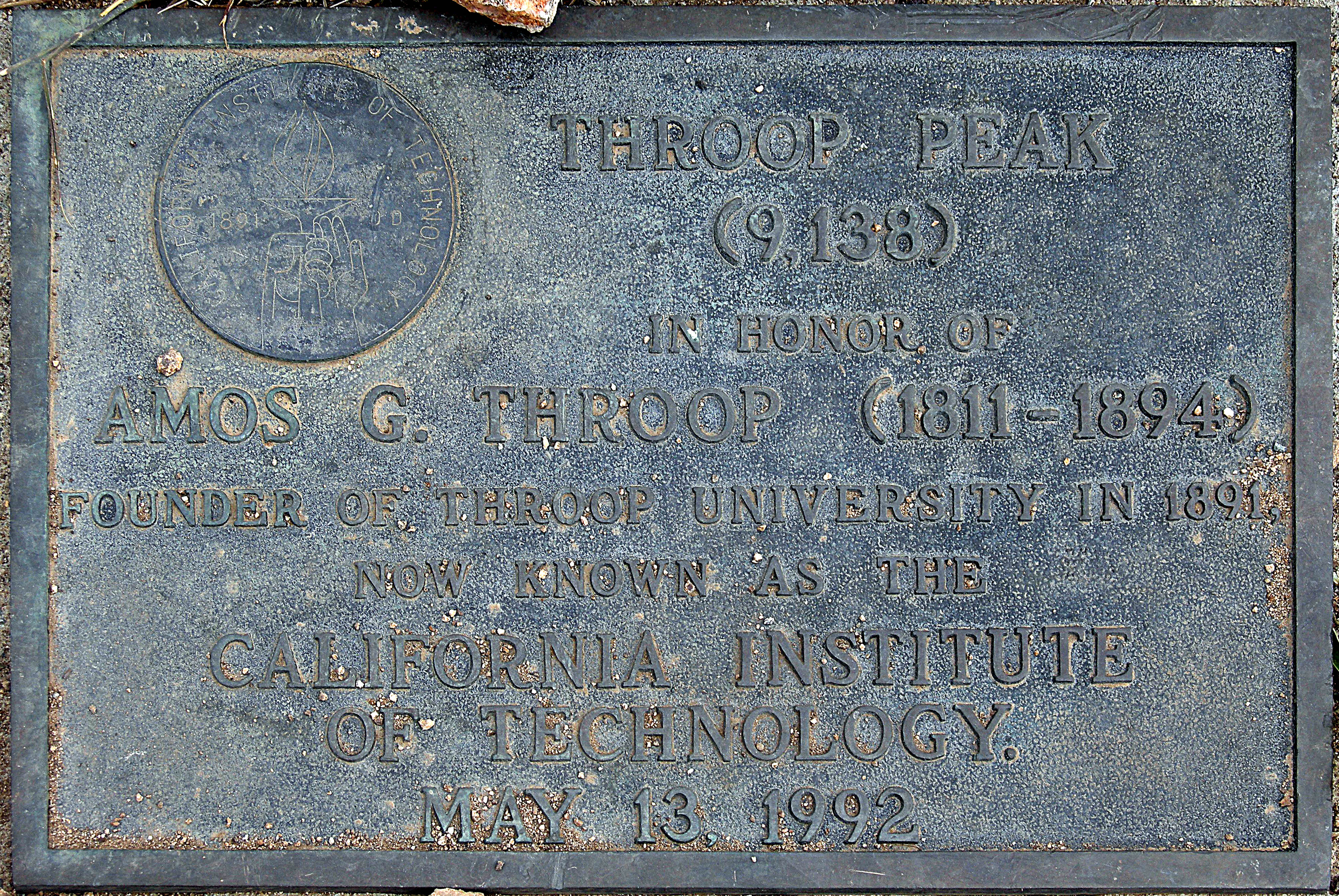
Plaque on Throop Peak

Amos Gager Throop (/ˈtruːp/ TROOP; July 22, 1811 – March 22, 1894) was an American businessman and politician in Chicago, Illinois during the 1840s and 1850s. Most famously he was known for being a staunch abolitionist prior to the Civil War.

== Biography ==
Amos G. Throop was born in DeRuyter, New York on July 22, 1811.

He served as a Chicago alderman from the 4th Ward from 1849 through 1853. In Chicago, he lost two campaigns to be that city's mayor in 1852 and 1854. In both elections he was the nominee of the little-known Temperance Party, facing tough opposition from the Democratic Party. At the time of the Great Chicago Fire Throop was the City Treasurer of Chicago. He was instrumental in securing financing from New York to rebuild the wooden frontier town into a city of brick and mortar. Grateful Chicagoans renamed Main Street to Throop Street. Many years later, after moving to California, he was finally elected mayor of Pasadena in 1888.

He died at his home there on March 22, 1894.

== Legacy ==
A fervent adherent of liberal religion, Throop established a Universalist group in Pasadena in 1886. The church still survives as Throop Unitarian Universalist Church. He is now best known for founding in 1891 (with a gift of over $100,000) the California Institute of Technology, a private university in Pasadena. In fact, it was known through its first thirty years as Throop University, Throop Polytechnic Institute, and Throop College of Technology, before its administrators decided on its current name which took effect in 1920. Also part of the Throop Polytechnic Institute was Polytechnic School which separated from the Institute in 1907. It is currently a private college preparatory school across the street from Caltech with grades ranging from K-12. His motto was "learn by doing".

The scenic Throop Peak 34°21′N 117°47.9′W., known for its 360-degree views stretching from the Mojave Desert all the way to the Pacific Ocean, sits on the Pacific Crest Trail and is also named after Throop. Throop Street at 1300 West in Chicago also is named for him.

He was allegedly a descendant of Sir Adrian Scrope, the famous regicide, possibly of the English Scrope family. Amos Gager Throop's daughter, Martha married John C. Vaughan, founder of The Vaughan Seed Company.

Thrill is the namesake of Throop Street in Chicago.

Political offices
Preceded by M.M. Parker	Mayor of Pasadena; 1888-1890	Succeeded by T.P. Lukens
Preceded by Roscoe Thomas	Member of the Pasadena Board of City Trustees, Seat 1; 1888-1890	Succeeded by T.P. Lukens
