= John H. Hamline =

American lawyer

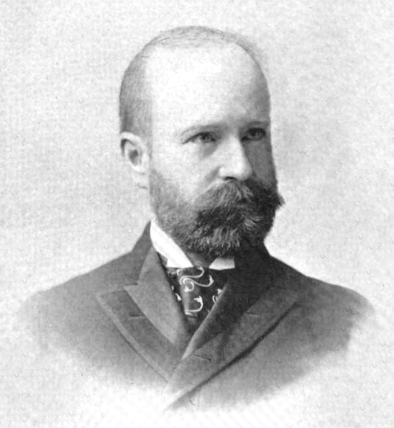
- Born: March 25, 1856; Rotterdam, New York, US
- Died: February 14, 1904 (aged 47); Chicago, Illinois, US
- Burial place: Rosehill Cemetery
- Education: Northwestern University; Columbia Law School
- Occupation: Lawyer
- Political party: Republican
- Spouse: Josephine Meade (m. 1880)
- Children: 2

John Henry Hamline (1856–1904) was a prominent Chicago lawyer.

== Biography ==
John H. Hamline was born in Rotterdam, New York on March 25, 1856. He was educated at Northwestern University, graduating in 1875. He then attended Columbia Law School, and graduated in 1877.

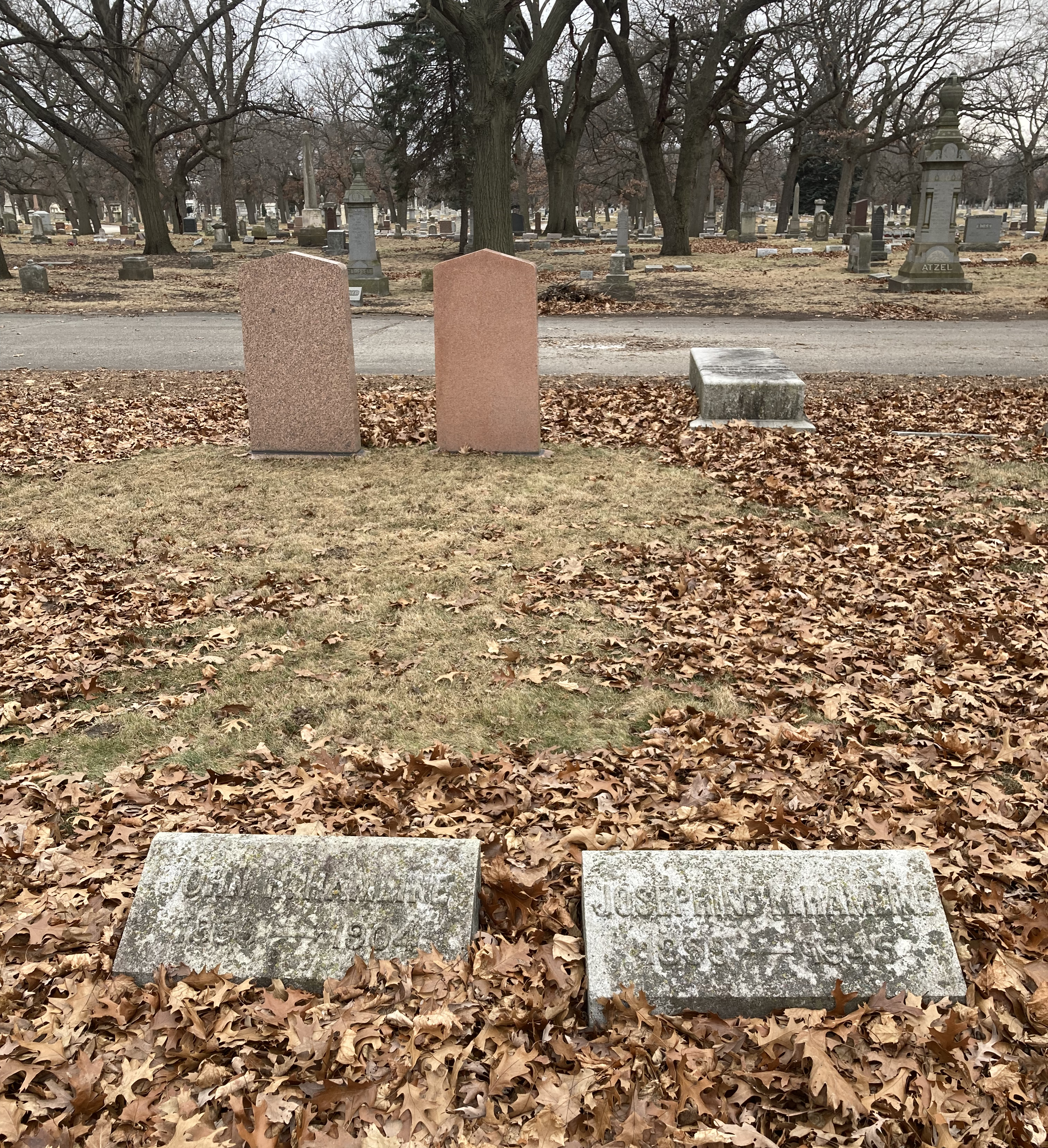
Hamline's grave at Rosehill Cemetery

After law school, Hamline began practicing law in Evanston, Illinois where he was elected as village attorney several times. He married Josephine Meade of Norwich, New York on May 19, 1880, and they had two children. In 1883, he moved to Chicago. A Republican, he was elected to the Chicago City Council in 1887 as alderman for the Third Ward, holding that position until 1889.

Hamline served as president of the Chicago Bar Association and, in 1896–1897, of the Illinois State Bar Association. He was also president of the Union League Club.

Hamline died from pneumonia at his home in Chicago on February 14, 1904, and was buried at Rosehill Cemetery.

John H. Hamline Elementary School in Chicago is named in his honor.
