= Arthur Dixon Elementary School =

Location
- 8306 S Saint Lawrence Avenue; Chicago, Illinois 60619; United States; 41.743355°N 87.610390°W

Information
- School type: Public K-8
- Opened: 1929
- School district: Chicago Public Schools
- Principal: Dr. Terrycita Perry
- Grades: preK-8
- Enrollment: 620 (2013)
- Average class size: 27
- Campus type: Urban
- Colors: Blue; Gold
- Team name: Eagles
- Website: www.dixoneagles.org

Arthur Dixon Elementary is a public K-8 school located in the Chatham neighborhood on the South Side of Chicago, Illinois. It is part of the Chicago Public Schools system. The school is named for Chicago alderman and businessman, Arthur Dixon. Dixon opened in 1929.

In 2012 it had 600 students; circa 2000 it had 750 students.

== Curriculum ==
As of 2012, it hosts an extensive art gallery of over 200 pieces, including mosaics, textiles, paintings made of oil and watercolors, and sculptures, in the interior and exterior. As of 2012 the school's art teacher is a career artist, and the school holds auctions in which students sell their art.

Its art program began circa 2002, and was developed by principal Joan Dameron Crisler. The art pieces have African-American themes. Between 2002 and 2012 none of its pieces have been stolen nor defaced. Sharon Dale, an assistant principal, continued the art program after Crisler received a new administrator mentoring job. School district budget cuts circa 2012 impacted the art program. The artwork and educational philosophy of Dixon Elementary were highlighted in the documentary The Curators of Dixon School.

Circa 2000 it also hosted a program sponsored by Dixon-Eagle Community Bank in which students simulate the operation of a bank to teach them financial skills. The school also had business simulation programs and had plans to open a community garden.

== Academic performance and student discipline ==
In 2012, Chicago Public Schools ranked Dixon (which is not a magnet school) a "Level 1," meaning that it has a high level of academic performance. It achieved this rating despite not being able to choose its own students. In 2015 it was ranked "Level 1+", the top rating in CPS' School Quality Rating Policy (SQRP). The overall score is determined from student attainment and growth on the NWEA MAP test, student attendance, My Voice and My School surveys, student growth on ACCESS for English Learners, and data quality of the report. The following table shows Dixon's overall rating and accountability status on all SQRP reports since the latter's inception in 2014–15.

CPS School Quality Rating Report Summary
Academic Year	Overall Rating (Note: Order of ratings from highest to lowest: Level 1+, Level 1, Level 2+, Level 2, Level 3)	Accountability Status
2014–15	Level 1	Good Standing
2015–16	Level 1+	Good Standing
2016–17	Level 1+	Good Standing
2017–18	Level 1+	Good Standing
2018–19	Level 1+	Good Standing
2019–20	Level 1+	Good Standing

As of 2012 the school does not have any metal detectors nor security guards.

== Feeder patterns ==
Portions of the Dixon attendance boundary are assigned to different high schools: Harlan Community Academy High School, Hirsch Metropolitan High School.
