= McClaughry =

McClaughry is a surname. Notable people with the surname include:

- John McClaughry (born 1937), American author and politician
- Robert Wilson McClaughry (1839–1920), American prison warden and reformer
- Wilfred McClaughry (1894–1943), Australian aviator and air commander
- William McClaughry, American slave

== See also ==
- Edgar McCloughry (1896–1972), Australian Royal Air Force air marshal and brother of Wilfred McClaughry
