= List of heads of the Chicago Police Department =

Head of the Chicago Police Department
- Chicago Police Department logo
- Incumbent; Larry Snelling since September 28, 2023
- Inaugural holder: Orsemus Morrison (as "High Constable")
- Formation: 1835 (as "High Constable")

The following is a list of heads of the Chicago Police Department.

Currently the executive of the Chicago Police Department is referred to as a "Superintendent of Police". Preceding titles included High Constable, City Marshall, General Superintendent of Police, and Commissioner of Police.

== History ==
The original head of police position, existent from 1835 through 1842, was referred to as "High Constable". The position was an elected one.

The second title used for the head of police was "City Marshall", which was used from 1842 through 1861. The position was an elected one. For a single year during (1855–56) this time, Chicago briefly had an appointed Chief of Police position that co-headed the department alongside the City Marshall.

The title used for the head of police from 1861 to 1927 was "General Superintendent of Police". The position was an appointed one. After the Board of Police Commissioners was legislated out of existence in 1875, the office of City Marshall was brought back to jointly serve as the head of the Chicago Police Department alongside the General Superintendent of Police. This time, the office was an appointed one. By vote of the City Council on May 31, 1876, the office of City Marshall was to be abolished. The office was consequentially eliminated June 5, 1876, with the position of General Superintendent of Police reinstated as the sole head of police. From this point on, the city has had only a singular head of police at a time.

From 1927 through 1960, the head of police was titled the Commissioner of Police.

In 1960, the head of police assumed its current title, Superintendent of Police.

Samuel Nolan was the first African-American individual to serve as head of the police department in an interim capacity, doing so from late–1979 until January 1980. Fred Rice Jr., who served as superintendent from 1983 through 1987, was the first African-American individual to serve on a permanent basis.

=== Recent ===
On November 8, 2019, Mayor Lori Lightfoot appointed retired Los Angeles police chief Charlie Beck as the city's interim superintendent. Mayor Rahm Emanuel had appointed former Bureau of Patrol Chief Eddie T. Johnson as Superintendent on March 28, 2016; on December 2, 2019, Mayor Lightfoot terminated Johnson's superintendent contract for cause. He was preceded by Garry F. McCarthy, former director of the Newark, New Jersey, Police Department, as superintendent; this was approved by the city council on June 8, 2011. McCarthy was the highest paid city employee with an annual salary of $260,004. McCarthy was fired by Mayor Rahm Emanuel on December 1, 2015, after refusing Emanuel's request that he resign over the city's high murder rate and his department's handling of the murder of Laquan McDonald.

Prior to McCarthy's appointment, Jody P. Weis had served as superintendent of police since February 2008. At the time, Weis was the second Chicago police superintendent hired from outside of the city. He replaced Philip J. Cline, who officially retired on August 3, 2007. Weis' contract expired on March 1, 2011. Mayor Richard M. Daley appointed Cline's predecessor, Terry Hillard, on an interim basis.

== List of heads of the Chicago Police Department ==
Order	Name	Tenure start	Tenure end	Title	Mayor(s) served under	Born	Died	Notes	Ref
1st	Orsemus Morrison	August 1835	May 2, 1837	High Constable	N/A^{A}	June 24, 1807	January 4, 1864	Served 1 term.	
2nd	John Shrigley	May 2, 1837	March 4, 1839	High Constable	William B. Ogden, Buckner Stith Morris	November 22, 1802	August 15, 1853	Served 1 term.	
3rd	Samuel James Lowe	March 5, 1839	February 28, 1842	High Constable	Benjamin W. Raymond, Alexander Loyd, Francis C. Sherman	1799	1851	Served 1 term.	
4th	Orson Smith	March 1, 1842	March 4, 1844	City Marshall	Francis C. Sherman, Benjamin W. Raymond, Augustus Garrett	April 29, 1801	January 29, 1863	Served 1 term.	
5th	Philip Dean	March 5, 1844	March 6, 1848	City Marshall	Augustus Garrett, Alson Sherman, Augustus Garrett, John Putnam Chapin, James Curtiss	June 24, 1804	November 17, 1861	Served 2 terms.	
6th	Ambrose Burnham	March 7, 1848	March 1, 1852	City Marshall	James Curtiss, James H. Woodworth, James Curtiss, Walter S. Gurnee	August 7, 1811	October 21, 1870	Served 2 terms.	
7th	James L. Howe	March 2, 1852	March 6, 1854	City Marshall	Walter S. Gurnee, Charles McNeill Gray	1815	1863	Served 1 term.	
8th	Darius Knights	March 7, 1854	March 3, 1856	City Marshall	Walter S. Gurnee, Isaac L. Milliken	1814	October 22, 1882	Served 1 term.	
9th	Cyrus Parker Bradley	May 26, 1855	1856	Chief of Police	Levi Boone	November 11, 1819	March 6, 1865	For a year, Chicago briefly had an appointed Chief of Police position that co-headed the department alongside the City Marshall.	
10th	James M. Donnelly	March 4, 1856	February 28, 1859	City Marshall	Levi Boone, John Wentworth, John C. Haines			Served 3 terms.	
11th	Jacob Rehm	March 1, 1859	March 5, 1860	City Marshall	John C. Haines	December 7, 1828	March 6, 1915	Served 1 term.	
12th	Iver Lawson	March 6, 1860	March 4, 1861	City Marshall	John C. Haines, John Wentworth			Served 1 term.	
13th	Cyrus Parker Bradley	April 6, 1861	1862	General Superintendent of Police	John Wentworth, Julian S. Rumsey, Francis C. Sherman	November 11, 1819	March 6, 1865	Was acting General Superintendent from April 6, 1861, until being appointed permanent General Superintendent on April 23, 1861.	
14th	Jacob Rehm	February 20, 1863	July 3, 1863	General Superintendent of Police	Francis C. Sherman	December 7, 1828	March 6, 1915	Initially appointed as interim General Superintendent, subsequently made permanent.	
—N/a	Cyrus Parker Bradley (interim)	July 1863	April 1864	General Superintendent of Police	Francis C. Sherman	November 11, 1819	March 6, 1865		
15th	William Turtle	April 23, 1864	November 29, 1865	General Superintendent of Police	Francis C. Sherman, John B. Rice	November 27, 1820	February 14, 1887		
16th	Jacob Rehm	November 1865	1871	General Superintendent of Police	John B. Rice, Roswell B. Mason	December 7, 1828	March 6, 1915	Was interim superintendent from November 1865 until being officially appointed as permanent superintendent on January 13, 1866.	
17th	William Wallace Kennedy	April 1871	July 29, 1872	General Superintendent of Police	Roswell B. Mason, Joseph Medill	May 1830	September 20, 1900		
18th	Elmer Washburn	July 29, 1872	December 29, 1873	General Superintendent of Police	Joseph Medill, Lester L. Bond, Harvey D. Colvin	December 25, 1834	November 23, 1918	Was interim General Superintendent from July 29, 1872, until being appointed permanent General Superintendent on August 12, 1872.	
19th	Jacob Rehm	December 22, 1873	October 4, 1875	General Superintendent of Police	Harvey D. Colvin	December 7, 1828	March 6, 1915		
20th	George L. Dunlap	July 30, 1875	November 22, 1875	City Marshall	Harvey D. Colvin			City Marshall, at this time, existed as co-head alongside General Superintendent of Police.	
21st	Michael C. Hickey	October 7, 1875	August 1, 1878	General Superintendent of Police	Harvey D. Colvin, Monroe Heath	1830	August 31, 1900		
22nd	Roswell Eaton Goodell	November 22, 1875	June 5, 1876	City Marshall	Harvey D. Colvin	October 21, 1825	October 19, 1903	City Marshall, at this time, existed as co-head alongside General Superintendent of Police.	
23rd	Valerius A. Seavey	August 1, 1878	September 7, 1879	General Superintendent of Police	Monroe Heath, Carter Harrison III	1840	September 7, 1879	Was interim General Superintendent from August 1, 1878, until being officially appointed as permanent General Superintendent on July 30, 1878.	
24th	Simon O'Donnell	December 15, 1879	November 30, 1880	General Superintendent of Police	Carter Harrison III	1834	August 3, 1893		
25th	William J. McGarigle	November 30, 1880	November 1882	General Superintendent of Police	Carter Harrison III	September 12, 1850	April 29, 1917	Was acting General Superintendent from November 30, 1880, until being officially appointed as permanent General Superintendent on December 13, 1880.	
26th	Austin J. Doyle	November 13, 1882	October 15, 1885	General Superintendent of Police	Carter Harrison III	September 18, 1849	February 6, 1924		
27th	Frederick Ebersold	October 15, 1885	February 14, 1888	General Superintendent of Police	Carter Harrison III, John A. Roche	March 30, 1841	January 21, 1900	Was interim General Superintendent from October 15, 1885, until being officially appointed as permanent General Superintendent on October 26, 1885.	
—N/a	Frederick H. Marsh (interim)	February 14, 1888	April 17, 1888	General Superintendent of Police	John A. Roche	1842	May 3, 1929		
28th	George W. Hubbard	April 17, 1888	1889	General Superintendent of Police	John A. Roche, DeWitt C. Cregier	February 22, 1850	???		
29th	Frederick H. Marsh	January 1, 1890	1891	General Superintendent of Police	DeWitt C. Cregier, Hempstead Washburne	1842	May 3, 1929		
30th	Robert Wilson McClaughry	May 18, 1891	May 1893	General Superintendent of Police	Hempstead Washburne, Carter Harrison III	July 22, 1839	November 9, 1920		
31st	Michael Brennan	May 1893	April 8, 1895	General Superintendent of Police	Carter Harrison III, George B. Swift, John P. Hopkins	1844	April 9, 1920	Was acting General Superintendent from May 1893 until being officially appointed permanent General Superintendent on September 11, 1893.	
—N/a	Joseph Kipley (interim)	April 8, 1895	April 11, 1895	General Superintendent of Police	John P. Hopkins; George B. Swift	January 6, 1848	February 6, 1904		
32nd	John J. Badenoch	April 11, 1895	April 1897	General Superintendent of Police	George B. Swift	April 5, 1851	April 27, 1933		
33rd	Joseph Kipley	April 16, 1897	April 23, 1901	General Superintendent of Police	George B. Swift, Carter Harrison IV	January 6, 1848	February 6, 1904		
—N/a	John E. Ptacek (interim)	April 16, 1901	April 30, 1901	General Superintendent of Police	Carter Harrison IV				
34th	Francis O'Neill	April 30, 1901	July 24, 1905	General Superintendent of Police	Carter Harrison IV, Edward F. Dunne	August 28, 1848	January 28, 1936		
—N/a	Herman F. Schuettler (interim)	July 24, 1905	July 26, 1905	General Superintendent of Police	Edward F. Dunne	July 14, 1861	August 22, 1918		
35th	John M. Collins	July 26, 1905	April 15, 1907	General Superintendent of Police	Edward F. Dunne	1840	1916		
36th	George M. Shippy	April 15, 1907	August 3, 1909	General Superintendent of Police	Fred A. Busse	June 24, 1854	April 13, 1913		
—N/a	Herman F. Schuettler (interim)	August 3, 1909	August 15, 1909	General Superintendent of Police	Fred A. Busse	July 14, 1861	August 22, 1918		
37th	LeRoy T. Steward	August 15, 1909	1911	General Superintendent of Police	Fred A. Busse	March 24, 1862	April 26, 1944		
—N/a	Herman F. Schuettler (interim)	1911	April 4, 1911	General Superintendent of Police	Fred A. Busse	July 14, 1861	August 22, 1918		
38th	John McWeeny	April 4, 1911	October 23, 1913	General Superintendent of Police	Fred A. Busse, Carter Harrison IV	March 15, 1857	December 26, 1934		
—N/a	Herman F. Schuettler (interim)	October 24, 1913	November 3, 1913	General Superintendent of Police	Carter Harrison IV	July 14, 1861	August 22, 1918		
39th	James Gleason	November 3, 1913	April 26, 1915	General Superintendent of Police	Carter Harrison IV	January 13, 1861	November 16, 1929		
40th	Charles C. Healy	April 26, 1915	January 11, 1917	General Superintendent of Police	William H. Thompson	May 14, 1856	1959		
41st	Herman F. Schuettler	January 11, 1917	August 22, 1918	General Superintendent of Police	William H. Thompson	July 14, 1861	August 22, 1918		
—N/a	John H. Alcock (interim)	January 11, 1918	November 25, 1918	General Superintendent of Police	William H. Thompson				
42nd	John J. Garrity	November 25, 1918	November 10, 1920	General Superintendent of Police	William H. Thompson	June 21, 1869	August 10, 1940		
43rd	Charles C. Fitzmorris	November 10, 1920	April 16, 1923	General Superintendent of Police	William H. Thompson	May 1, 1884	August 18, 1948		
44th	Morgan A. Collins	April 16, 1923	April 14, 1927	General Superintendent of Police	William E. Dever	April 5, 1886	March 21, 1946		
45th	Michael Hughes	April 14, 1927	July 25, 1928	Commissioner of Police	William E. Dever, William H. Thompson	September 24, 1870	June 21, 1956	Was acting General Superintendent from April 14, 1927, until being officially appointed permanent General Superintendent on April 16, 1923.	
46th	William F. Russell	September 12, 1928	June 16, 1930	Commissioner of Police	William H. Thompson	December 1, 1874	April 1, 1946	Initially acting Commissioner, elevated to permanent Commissioner.	
—N/a	John H. Alcock (interim)	June 16, 1930	October 1, 1931	Commissioner of Police	William H. Thompson, Anton Cermak				
47th	James P. Allman	October 1, 1931	January 1, 1946	Commissioner of Police	Anton Cermak, Frank J. Corr, Edward J. Kelly	October 16, 1875	February 24, 1956		
48th	John C. Prendergast	January 1, 1946	November 16, 1950	Commissioner of Police	Edward J. Kelly, Martin H. Kennelly	October 19, 1884	January 16, 1958		
49th	Timothy J. O'Connor	November 14, 1950	1960^{B}	Commissioner of Police	Martin H. Kennelly, Richard J. Daley	January 27, 1902	December 31, 1968		
50th	O. W. Wilson	March 2, 1960	July 1, 1967	Superintendent of Police	Richard J. Daley	May 15, 1900	October 18, 1972		
51st	James Conlisk Jr.	July 1, 1967	November 1, 1973	Superintendent of Police	Richard J. Daley	October 2, 1918	September 29, 1984	Initially interim Superintendent, elevated to permanent Superintendent.	
52nd	James M. Rochford	November 1, 1973	October 11, 1977	Superintendent of Police	Richard J. Daley, Michael A. Bilandic	October 1, 1921	April 14, 2004	Was acting Superintendent, from November 1, 1973, until being officially appointed as permanent Superintendent on February 11, 1974.	
—N/a	Michael Spiotto (interim)	October 11, 1977	April 10, 1978	Superintendent of Police	Michael A. Bilandic				
53rd	James E. O'Grady	April 10, 1978	April 25, 1979	Superintendent of Police	Michael A. Bilandic, Jane Byrne	1929	—N/a		
—N/a	Joseph DiLeonardi (interim)	April 25, 1979	September 1, 1979	Superintendent of Police	Jane Byrne	March 31, 1932	January 28, 2017	Relieved of command by Mayor Jane Byrne.	
—N/a	Samuel Nolan (interim)	September 1, 1979	January 11, 1980	Superintendent of Police	Jane Byrne		September 30, 1997		
54th	Richard J. Brzeczek	January 11, 1980	April 29, 1983	Superintendent of Police	Jane Byrne	October 8, 1942	—N/a	Discharged by Mayor Jane Byrne.	
—N/a	James E. O'Grady (interim)	April 29, 1983	August 27, 1983	Superintendent of Police	Jane Byrne; Harold Washington	1929	—N/a		
55th	Fred Rice Jr.	August 27, 1983	November 1, 1987	Superintendent of Police	Harold Washington	December 24, 1926	January 10, 2011		
56th	LeRoy Martin	November 18, 1987	April 12, 1992	Superintendent of Police	Harold Washington, Eugene Sawyer, Richard M. Daley	1929	August 31, 2013		
57th	Matt L. Rodriguez	April 13, 1992	December 1, 1997	Superintendent of Police	Richard M. Daley	April 5, 1936	—N/a		
58th	Terry G. Hillard	February 18, 1998	April 18, 2003	Superintendent of Police	Richard M. Daley	August 11, 1943	—N/a		
59th	Philip J. Cline	October 6, 2003	April 2, 2007	Superintendent of Police	Richard M. Daley	October 10, 1949	—N/a		
60th	Jody Weis	February 1, 2008	March 1, 2011	Superintendent of Police	Richard M. Daley	December 10, 1957	—N/a		
—N/a	Terry G. Hillard (interim)	March 1, 2011	May 11, 2011	Superintendent of Police	Richard M. Daley	August 11, 1943	—N/a		
61st	Garry McCarthy	May 11, 2011	December 1, 2015	Superintendent of Police	Rahm Emanuel	May 4, 1959	—N/a		
—N/a	John Escalante (interim)	December 1, 2015	March 28, 2016	Superintendent of Police	Rahm Emanuel		—N/a	Returned to command as First Deputy Superintendent of Police on March 28, 2016.	
62nd	Eddie T. Johnson	March 28, 2016	December 2, 2019	Superintendent of Police	Rahm Emanuel, Lori Lightfoot	July 28, 1960	—N/a	Was interim Superintendent from March 28, 2016, until being officially appointed as permanent Superintendent on April 13, 2016; discharged by Mayor Lori Lightfoot.	
—N/a	Charlie Beck (interim)	December 2, 2019	April 15, 2020	Superintendent of Police	Lori Lightfoot	June 27, 1953	—N/a		
63rd	David Brown	April 15, 2020	March 16, 2023	Superintendent of Police	Lori Lightfoot	September 18, 1960	—N/a	Was acting Superintendent from April 15, 2020, until being officially appointed as permanent Superintendent on April 22, 2020. Resigned post on March 16, 2023.	
—N/a	Eric Carter (interim)	March 16, 2023	May 15, 2023	Superintendent of Police	Lori Lightfoot		—N/a	Interim superintendent; stepped down on May 15, 2022	
—N/a	Fred Waller (interim)	May 15, 2023	September 27, 2023	Superintendent of Police	Brandon Johnson		—N/a		
64th	Larry Snelling	September 27, 2023	July 15, 2026		Brandon Johnson		—N/a		
—N/a	Fred Waller (interim)	July 16, 2026	Incumbent		Brandon Johnson		—N/a		

== See also ==
- List of heads of the Chicago Fire Department

== Notes ==
^A Orsemus Morrison's tenure predates the incorporation of Chicago as a city. While no mayor was serving at the time he was High Constable, John H. Kinzie was Town President

^B The position of "General Superintendent of Police" ceased to be the head of the Chicago Police Department prior to the end of O'Connor's tenure, which was December 29, 1964
