= LeRoy Martin =

Chicago Police Department officer and superintendent

- Martin, c. 1981

56th Superintendent of the Chicago Police Department
- In office November 18, 1987 – January 29, 1992
- Appointed by: Harold Washington
- Preceded by: Fred Rice Jr.
- Succeeded by: Matt L. Rodriguez

Director of Public Safety for the Chicago Housing Authority
- In office 1992–1994

Personal details
- Born: 1929 Chicago, Illinois, U.S.
- Died: August 31, 2013 (aged 83–84) Dyer, Indiana, U.S.
- Party: Republican
- Spouse: Constance B. Martin (m. 1954)
- Children: 3
- Education: Roosevelt University
- Occupation: Police officer; superintendent
- Police career
- Department: Chicago Police Department
- Service years: 1955−1992
- Rank: Superintendent (sworn in November 1987)

LeRoy Martin (1929 − August 31, 2013) was an American police officer for the Chicago Police Department. In November 1987, after the retirement of Fred Rice Jr., Martin succeeded Rice as police superintendent. Martin was the third African-American to serve as Chicago's police superintendent, as well as only the second to do so as a permanent appointee (with Rice having been the first to do so as a permanent appointee and interim superintendent Samuel Nolan having been the first to do so overall).

== Biography ==
=== Early life and education ===
Martin was born the fourth of five children in 1929 in Chicago, Illinois. His parents migrated to Chicago from Grenada, Mississippi in the early-1920s. Martin's father was a pullman porter. Martin was raised in the North Lawndale neighborhood on the city's west side, attending Richard T. Crane Technical High School. Martin later earned a master's degree in Public Administration and a bachelor's degree from Roosevelt University.

=== Career ===
In the 1950s, Martin worked as a bus driver for the Chicago Transit Authority. Martin joined the Chicago Police Department in 1955 as a patrolman in the Woodlawn and Burnside neighborhoods on the city's south side. Martin was appointed superintendent of the Chicago Police Department by mayor Harold Washington on November 18, 1987. Martin served as superintendent until January 1992. After his term as superintendent, Martin served as the Director of Public Safety for the Chicago Housing Authority from 1992 until 1994. Thereafter, Martin worked in the private sector security director for Central Management Services. In 1998, Martin ran as a Republican, challenging Michael F. Sheahan to be the Sheriff of Cook County, Illinois. Martin was unsuccessful.

== Personal life and death ==
Martin was married to Constance B. Martin at the time of his death, having been married since 1954. Together, they had three children, Ron, LeRoy Jr., and Dawn. Martin died of a heart attack on August 31, 2013, aged 84, in Dyer, Indiana. A funeral service was held for Martin on September 6, 2013, with hundreds in attendance.

== Electoral history ==
1998 Cook County Sheriff Republican primary
Party	Candidate	Votes	%
Republican	LeRoy Martin	107,868	100
Total votes		107,868	100

1998 Cook County Sheriff election
Party	Candidate	Votes	%
Democratic	Michael F. Sheahan (incumbent)	903,053	71.11
Republican	LeRoy Martin	366,867	28.89
Total votes		1,269,920	100
