= Michael F. Sheahan =

American politician and sheriff

Sheriff of Cook County, Illinois
- In office December 1990 – December 2006
- Preceded by: James E. O'Grady
- Succeeded by: Tom Dart

Chicago Alderman from the 19th ward
- In office April 16, 1979 – December 1990
- Preceded by: Jeremiah E. Joyce
- Succeeded by: Virginia Rugai

Personal details
- Born: 1944 or 1945
- Education: Governors State University (M.Ed.); Saint Joseph's College

Michael F. Sheahan (born 1944/1945) is an American politician and sheriff. He formerly served as Sheriff of Cook County, Illinois and as a Chicago alderman.

== Early life ==
Sheahan was born in 1944 or 1945.

He received a Master of Education from Governors State University and a bachelor's degree from Saint Joseph's College.

== Early career ==
Sheahan worked as a high school teacher and coach from 1967 through 1971. From 1971 through 1979, he worked as an officer for the Chicago Police Department.

== Chicago alderman ==
In 1979, Sheahan was elected alderman from Chicago's 19th Ward, taking office in the Chicago City Council on April 16, 1979.

He was reelected in 1983 and 1987.

During the Council Wars of the mayoralty of Harold Washington, Sheahan was a member of the Vrdolyak 29, a bloc of alderman, led by Edward Vrdolyak, which stood in opposition to Washington. Amid the Washington mayoralty, Sheahan even spoke of possibly switching to the Republican Party.

During the period in which Eugene Sawyer was mayor, he was considered supportive of the mayor. He was also considered a political ally of mayor Richard M. Daley.

== Cook County Sheriff ==
=== 1990 election ===
Corruption allegations had taken a toll on incumbent Republican James E. O'Grady's prospects for reelection. O'Grady ultimately had failed to live up to his 1986 campaign promises of disposing of politics and corruption in the Cook County Sheriff's Office, and had become unpopular among his constituents.

Amid the 1990 campaign, a Cook County correctional officer was shot and critically wounded while hanging signs for Sheahan outside of the South Side bar. Three men, including a correctional officer who supported O'Grady, were arrested for this. This led to a decline of O'Grady's support in the polls. Additionally, an incident soon after occurred where Sheahan had a campaign office shot at.

In 1990, Sheahan defeated O'Grady by a broad margin. O'Grady suffered one of biggest defeats that a Republican Party nominee had experienced in a countywide Cook County election in years. Sheahan had managed to beat O'Grady in 24 of the county's 30 suburban townships and in every ward of Chicago. Sheahan had even managed to carry many of the county's Republican strongholds.

=== Tenure ===
Sheahan was reelected in 1994, 1998, and 2002.

Early into his tenure, he received praise for running what appeared to be a much less corrupt Sheriff's Office than his predecessors had. To "clean up" the office, he ended the practice of soliciting sheriff's workers for political contributions, and he fired dozens of "ghost workers" who were paid for no-show jobs. He also ended the long-corrupt part-time deputy program.

Sheahan received praise for programs such as a boot camp for first-time offenders. He also received criticism over abuse of inmates by jail guards.

Sheahan regularly butted heads with members of the Cook County Board of Commissioners.

In November 2005, he announced that he would not be seeking reelection the following year. His term would end in December 2006.

== Personal life ==
Sheahan and his wife Nancy have six children, Katie, Michael, Terrence, Timothy, Patrick, and Ryan.

His brother James "Skinny" Sheahan is a civic leader on Chicago's Southwest Side. Richard M. Daley appointed him as Chicago's Director of Special Events in 1993. He would long serve as a Daley aid. James sits on the board of Special Olympics Chicago.

== Electoral history ==
=== Aldermanic ===
1979 Chicago 19th Ward aldermanic election
Party	Candidate	Votes	%
Nonpartisan	Michael F. Sheahan		
Nonpartisan			
Total votes			100

1983 Chicago 19th Ward aldermanic election
Party	Candidate	Votes	%
Nonpartisan	Michael F. Sheahan		
Nonpartisan			
Total votes			100

1987 Chicago 19th Ward aldermanic election
Party	Candidate	Votes	%
Nonpartisan	Michael F. Sheahan		
Nonpartisan	Maurice E. Johnson		
Total votes			100

=== Sheriff ===
1990

1990 Cook County Sheriff Democratic primary
Party	Candidate	Votes	%
Democratic	Michael F. Sheahan	402,634	69.86
Democratic	Philip Morris	106,237	18.43
Democratic	John J. Flood	67,450	11.70
Total votes		576,321	100

1990 Cook County Sheriff election
Party	Candidate	Votes	%
Democratic	Michael F. Sheahan	719,489	55.41
Republican	James E. O'Grady (incumbent)	369,631	28.47
Harold Washington	Tommy Brewer	191,101	14.72
Illinois Solidarity	William M. Piechuch Sr.	18,318	1.41
Total votes		1,298,539	100

1994

1994 Cook County Sheriff Democratic primary
Party	Candidate	Votes	%
Democratic	Michael F. Sheahan (incumbent)	388,977	67.41
Democratic	Tommy H. Brewer	188,025	32.59
Total votes		577,002	100

1994 Cook County Sheriff election
Party	Candidate	Votes	%
Democratic	Michael F. Sheahan (incumbent)		
Republican	John D. Tourtelot		
Harold Washington	William A. Brown		
Populist	William J. Benson		
Total votes			100

1998

1998 Cook County Sheriff Democratic primary
Party	Candidate	Votes	%
Democratic	Michael F. Sheahan (incumbent)	367,157	100
Total votes		367,157	100

1998 Cook County Sheriff election
Party	Candidate	Votes	%
Democratic	Michael F. Sheahan (incumbent)	903,053	71.11
Republican	LeRoy Martin	366,867	28.89
Total votes		1,269,920	100

2002

2002 Cook County Sheriff Democratic primary
Party	Candidate	Votes	%
Democratic	Michael F. Sheahan (incumbent)	558,682	100
Total votes		558,682	100

2002 Cook County Sheriff election
Party	Candidate	Votes	%
Democratic	Michael F. Sheahan (incumbent)	984,348	76.88
Republican	Ronald Swick	296,062	23.12
Total votes		1,280,410	100
