= Richard J. Brzeczek =

American politician and law enforcement official (born 1942)

Superintendent of the Chicago Police Department
- In office January 11, 1980 – April 29, 1983
- Mayor: Jane Byrne
- Preceded by: James E. O'Grady; Joseph DiLeonardi, Samuel Nolan (interim)
- Succeeded by: Fred Rice Jr. James E. O'Grady (interim)

Personal details
- Born: October 8, 1942 (age 83) Chicago, Illinois
- Party: Republican (since 1983)
- Spouse: Elizabeth Brzeczek (m. 1965)
- Children: 4
- Education: Loyola University Chicago (undergrad); Illinois Institute of Technology (graduate); UIC John Marshall Law School (J.D.)

Ricahard J. Brzeczek (born October 8, 1942) is an American former law enforcement official who served as superintendent of the Chicago Police Department from 1980 through 1983. In 1984, he ran unsuccessfully as the Republican nominee for Cook County State's Attorney.

== Early life ==
Brzeczek was born October 8, 1942, in the Humboldt Park neighborhood of Chicago to Elizabeth and Raymond Brzeczek, both of Polish descent. He was the eldest of three children in his family. Brzeczek attended St. Helen's elementary school in Chicago, attended two years at Quigley Seminary, and graduated from Weber High School. He played baseball throughout his youth. Later on, in 1983, when Bowie Kuhn would retire as Commissioner of Baseball, Chicago White Sox owner Jerry Reinsdorf would submit Brzeczek's name as a potential replacement. Brzeczek received a bachelor degree in biology from Loyola University Chicago. In 1968 he graduated from the Illinois Institute of Technology with a master's degree in public administration. In 1972, he received his J.D. degree from John Marshall Law School, having participated in an accelerated 3/12 year program while working as a full-time police officer with the Chicago Police Department.

== Chicago Police Department ==
In 1970, Brzeczek joined the Chicago Police Department as a patrolman.

=== Superintendent of the Chicago Police Department ===
January 11, 1980, having been appointed by mayor Jane Byrne, Brzeczek became superintendent of the Chicago Police Department. At age 37, he was the youngest superintendent in the department's history. He had only been on the force for nine years and ten months by the time he reached the top position. At the time he took office, he had to deal with an illegal Chicago Fire Department strike, and the potential for a police department strike to follow. His tenure received some praise. In 1993, then-superintendent Matt L. Rodriguez praised his tenure, by saying, "At the time he came into the superintendent position, the department was kind of parochial. He got the department moving out of that mode by getting the command staff into national and state police associations. And he expanded the system of training for managers. Both those things direct people's attention to what it was before and what it was when he left: state-of-the-art policing." According to Rodriguez in 1993, Brzeczek laid a strong foundation for his successors. During the 1983 Chicago mayoral election, Brzeczek criticized candidate Harold Washington, declaring that downtown streets would become unsafe under a Washington mayoralty. In April 1983, after Harold Washington won the election, Brzeczek tendered his resignation as superintendent, to become effective on April 29, 1983, hours before Washington would be sworn in as mayor.

==== Controversies ====
===== Police department torture =====
In 1982, after the torture of Andrew Wilson, a doctor that saw Wilson afterward wrote a letter to Brzeczek. In 2006, after a four-year long investigation into allegations of torture conducted by Jon Burge and others in the Chicago Police Department, prosecutors concluded that as superintendent, Brzeczek was guilty of "dereliction of duty" and had acted in bad faith by failing to take action upon suspicions that Burge and other detectives under his command had engaged in mistreatment of prisoners. The prosecutors alleged that, while publicly praising the detectives engaging in these activities, Brzeczek held private suspicions about their activities.

===== 1986 indictment and acquittal =====
On March 13, 1986, Brzeczek was indicted by a Cook County grand jury on 24 counts of theft and official misconduct, which stemmed from trips he took under the pretenses of attending meetings which the Cook County State's Attorney's office alleged had never taken place. The indictment alleged he had misused $1,231 from the Chicago Police Department travel fund to travel to Minneapolis in December 1982 and San Diego in August 1982 for what he claimed were a meeting of the American Bar Association and a law enforcement seminar. The indictment stemmed from an investigation begun two years prior after the Chicago Police Department received an anonymous tip that it should investigate its contingency fund. It was alleged by prosecutors that he used the trips to visit a girlfriend. Brzeczek claimed the charges were a politically motivated smear campaign related to the fact he ran against Richard M. Daley for state's attorney. Brzeczek was acquitted on May 14, 1987, after Criminal Court Judge Robert Boharic found him not guilty of all counts, ruling that the financial records were kept by "bureaucratic forgers" and were not accurate enough to prove that Brzeczek had stolen city funds to visit a girlfriend.

== Later career ==
=== 1984 Cook County State's Attorney campaign ===
Brzeczek joined the Republican Party, and in 1984 ran as its nominee for Cook County State's Attorney, losing the general election to incumbent Democrat Richard M. Daley by a large margin. Brzeczek's performance in the election was regarded as disappointing, as he lost to Daley even in many Republican leaning parts of suburban Cook County. Brzeczek later opened his own law practice on the Northwest Side of Chicago.

=== Written works ===
In 1987, Brzeczek and his wife, Elizabeth, along with Sharon De Vita, co-authored the book Addicted to Adultery: How We Saved Our Marriage/How You Can Save Yours.

== Personal life ==
In January 1965, Brzeczek married his wife Elizabeth. Together, they have four children, Natalie, Mark, Kevin, and Holly. Shortly after he became superintendent, Brzeczek began a 3.5 year-long extramarital affair with a flight attendant he met on a flight. Around this time, Brzeczek also suffered from excessive drinking. His personal difficulties would lead him to twice admit himself to a psychiatric hospital.

== Electoral history ==
1984 Cook County State's Attorney Republican primary
Party	Candidate	Votes	%
Republican	Richard J. Brzeczek	135,852	100
Total votes		135,852	100

1984 Cook County State's Attorney election
Party	Candidate	Votes	%
Democratic	Richard M. Daley (incumbent)	1,418,775	65.98
Republican	Richard J. Brzeczek	731,634	34.02
Total votes		2,150,409	100
