= James E. O'Grady =

American law enforcement official

Sheriff of Cook County, Illinois
- In office 1986–1990
- Preceded by: Richard Elrod
- Succeeded by: Michael F. Sheahan

Superintendent of the Chicago Police Department
- In office April 29 – August 27, 1983 (interim)
- Mayor: Jane Byrne; Harold Washington
- Preceded by: Richard J. Brzeczek
- Succeeded by: Fred Rice, Jr.
- In office April 10, 1978 – April 25, 1979
- Mayor: Michael A. Bilandic; Jane Byrne
- Preceded by: James M. Rochford; Michael Spiotto (interim)
- Succeeded by: Richard J. Brzeczek; Joseph DiLeonardi, Samuel Nolan (interim)

Personal details
- Born: January 21, 1929 Chicago, Illinois, U.S.
- Died: January 6, 2026 (aged 96)
- Party: Republican (since 1985)
- Other political affiliations: Democratic (until 1985)

James E. O'Grady (January 21, 1929 – January 5, 2026) was an American law enforcement official who served as Superintendent of the Chicago Police Department and Sheriff of Cook County, Illinois.

== Early life ==
O'Grady was born in Chicago on January 21, 1929. His father was a police officer.

== Chicago Police Department career ==
=== Early career ===
In 1952, O'Grady became a member of the Chicago Police Department.

While working in vice control, earned a reputation for tackling organized crime and prostitution rackets.

In 1968, he was knocked unconscious after a rock was thrown at him during disturbances at the Cabrini–Green Homes. In 1971, while off-duty, he was shot in his left hip whilst chasing a purse-snatcher in The Loop.

By the mid-1970s, O'Grady had become the department's Chief of Detectives.

=== Superintendent of the Chicago Police Department ===
After the resignation of James M. Rochford as Superintendent of Police, mayor Michael Bilandic appointed O'Grady as his replacement on April 10, 1978.

In 1978, during his tenure as Superintendent, a police fleeing O'Grady after O'Grady ordered him to stop his car came close to running O'Grady over.

O'Grady promoted the first black woman to the rank of sergeant in Chicago's police force. In his tenure, he won praise for being tough on police corruption. However, the Better Government Association criticized him for failing to sufficiently curb illegal spying by officers on citizens and political organizations.

Another controversy arose when the media reported that police officers were strip searching female motorists stopped for minor traffic offenses. Despite having had an already ten-month long investigation of this practice, O'Grady did not put an end to it until the media reported on it.

Another controversy occurred in the department when Thomas Donovan, then the patronage chief of the mayor's office, called police officers to his home following the arrest of his son for bicycle theft.

During the 1979 Chicago mayoral election, candidate Jane Byrne pledged to remove O'Grady as police chief if elected, accusing him of having "politicized" the department. Byrne defeated Bilandic for the Democratic nomination, and was elected mayor. Days after her inauguration as mayor, O'Grady resigned his position of Superintendent. His tenure as Superintendent was just over a year in length.

== Cook County Undersheriff ==
For a two-year period, from 1979 through 1981, he left the Chicago Police Department to work for the Cook County Sheriff's Office as the undersheriff to Sheriff Richard Elrod.

== Return to Chicago Police Department ==
In 1981, he returned to the Chicago Police Department this time as First Deputy Superintendent. Mayor Byrne rescinded her past accusations that he had politicized the department while Superintendent.

=== Interim Superintendent of the Chicago Police Department ===
After Richard J. Brzeczek resigned as Superintendent of the Chicago Police Department on April 29, 1983, mayor Byrne (on her last day in office) appointed O'Grady as interim superintendent. On August 27, 1983, Fred Rice, Jr., appointed by mayor Harold Washington, took over as permanent superintendent.

That year, O'Grady resigned from the police force, ultimately ending his 32 year Chicago Police Department career.

== Interim private sector career ==
O'Grady founded the private security firm Special Operations Associates (SOA), which he co-owned with James Dvorak, Daniel M. Davis, and Mike Caccitolo. He served as its CEO for a while. Amid O'Grady's bid to be Cook County Sheriff, the firm was contracted to investigate the unsolved murder of Diane Masters, and uncovered evidence which pointed to her husband being responsible.

== Cook County Sheriff ==
=== 1986 election ===
O'Grady was elected Sheriff as a Republican in the Democratic Party-dominated Cook County, Illinois, unseating incumbent Democrat Richard Elrod. He was the first Republican elected to countywide office there since Bernard Carey, who had been elected to his final term as Cook County State's Attorney in 1976. Upon his victory, he spoke of creating, "a new generation of politics" in Cook County. His victory came from winning the county's suburbs by a 2–1 margin. He had also performed well in some of the ethnically white wards of Chicago, being able to carry 14 of the city's 50 wards.

O'Grady, up until then a Democrat, had switched his party registration to Republican in September 1985, in order to run under the Republican Party's ballot line. When switching parties, O'Grady had disclosed that in the previous two presidential elections, he had voted for the Republican ticket, and had grown disaffected from the national Democratic party in the recent years. He had been courted by President Ronald Reagan and Vice President George H. W. Bush to run for office. When rumors had arisen in 1985 that O'Grady would potentially challenge Elrod, either in the general election as a Republican or in the primary as a Democrat, Cook County Republican Party chairman Donald Totten actively courted O'Grady to run as a Republican. Other Republicans that courted O'Grady to switch parties were former governor Richard B. Ogilvie, Chicago Republican Party chairman Lou Kasper, and former U.S Attorney Dan K. Webb.

O'Grady's campaign was run by James Dvorak, who he would later hire as undersheriff once he took office. He was a first-time candidate for political office.

During his campaign he pledged to get rid of political influences in the sheriff's office (such as all political fundraising activities by the office), strengthen jail security, and develop a disaster plan. He also pledged to combat corruption in the office.

O'Grady won the endorsement of the editorial board of the Chicago Tribune.

During his campaign, O'Grady had strong network of campaign workers, and strong fundraising totals. He received strong support from police officers.

=== Tenure ===
O'Grady was, early in his tenure, a popular politician, speculated for a potential future run for Chicago mayor, County Board president, or governor.

In 1988, his undersheriff James Dvorak made a successful bid to be Chairman of the Cook County Republican Party Dvorak had been backed by Governor James R. Thompson against incumbent Donald Totten.

Despite having campaigned against vice, under O'Grady, the number of arrests made for gambling and prostitution greatly declined. This occurred during a restructuring of the office's previously scandal-plagued vice unit.

O'Grady ultimately had failed to live up to his campaign promises of disposing of politics and corruption in the Cook County Sheriff's Office, and had become unpopular among his constituents.

==== Investigations and corruption in Sheriff's office ====
Corruption was significant in the Cook County Sheriff's Office under O'Grady's tenure.

In 1989, it was revealed that his chief bodyguard and another officer had interfered with a gambling raid being conducted by the office's vice officers.

In 1989 a newspaper reported allegations that the department had, for as many as fifteen years, been suppressing investigations of murders and internal corruption. O'Grady immediately moved for the dismissal of two officers after this story broke.

Federal investigators began investigating both O'Grady and his undersheriff James Dvorak in 1989.

In November 1989, the Chicago Tribune released a two-part series which alleged that, "Sheriff O'Grady has demanded thousands of dollars in campaign contributions from deputies and given sensitive law-enforcement jobs to political cronies." The report alleged that at least four high ranking employees in the Sheriff's office, including Dvorak, ran political organizations which solicited contributions from their colleagues and subordinates. It also alleged job selling and other corruption in the office. Two weeks after this report, Dvorak resigned, followed by Richard Simon, the head of the Sheriff office's part-time deputy program.

In early 1990, O'Grady and Dvorak were investigated by a federal grand jury for directing a $1.8 million contract to Home Incarceration Systems of Illinois (HISNI). HISNI was run by an attorney for Special Operations Associates Inc. (SOA), which was a private security firm co-owned by O'Grady and Dvorak with Daniel M. Davis. In August 1991, Davis was indicted for obstruction of justice for hiding a document which detailed a stock purchase arrangement between HISNI and SOA.

In 1990, it arose that alleged mob boss Ernest Rocco Infelice had, on tape recorder, shared allegations with a federal informant that he had paid $10,000 on a monthly basis to Dvorak for protection from vice investigations.

Corruption from O'Grady's tenure continued to surface after he left office.

In May 1992, James Novelli, who had been the chief investigator for the Sheriff's Merit Board, pled guilty to accepting bribes to rig test grades and to change applications for correction officer jobs. Novelli would later plead guilty to additional charges of bribery and conspiracy. Prosecutors ultimately would file a document with the court that suggested that 1,500 applicants were given a free pass before taking the exam during O'Grady's tenure. The FBI also later found that 367 people had received jobs with the sheriff's office despite failing the test.

In 1993, 1994 and 1996, Dvorak pleaded guilty to tax and bribery charges which stemmed from both from payoffs from organized crime and from a large scheme he and others operated during O'Grady's tenure which rigged hiring tests for unqualified applicants and placed more than twenty "ghost jobs" on the sheriff's payroll. O'Grady was not indicted.

=== 1990 reelection campaign ===
Corruption allegations took a toll on O'Grady's prospects for reelection.

Amid the 1990 reelection campaign, a Cook County correctional officer was shot and critically wounded while hanging signs for O'Grady's Democratic opponent Michael Sheahan outside of the South Side bar. Three men, including a correctional officer who supported O'Grady, were arrested for this. This led to a decline of O'Grady's support in the polls. Additionally, an incident soon after occurred where Sheahan had a campaign office shot at.

In 1990, he was defeated for reelection by a broad margin by Sheahan. His defeat was one of the biggest defeats that a Republican Party nominee had experienced in a countywide Cook County election in years. Sheahan had managed to beat him in 24 of the county's 30 suburban townships. The ethnically white wards of Chicago, where O'Grady had performed well in 1986, went to Sheahan in 1990, with O'Grady failing to carry a single ward of the city. O'Grady had even failed to carry many of the county's Republican strongholds. Within the city of Chicago, O'Grady even trailed Harold Washington Party nominee Tommy Brewer, who was considered a political unknown.

== Death ==
O'Grady died on January 6, 2026, at the age of 96.

== Electoral history ==
1987

1987 Cook County Sheriff Republican primary
Party	Candidate	Votes	%
Republican	James O'Grady	82,185	100

1986 Cook County Sheriff election
Party	Candidate	Votes	%
Republican	James E. O'Grady	706,659	51.21
Democratic	Richard J. Elrod (incumbent)	673,233	48.79
Total votes		1,379,892	100

1990

1990 Cook County Sheriff Republican primary
Party	Candidate	Votes	%
Republican	James E. O'Grady (incumbent)	136,857	100
Total votes		136,857	100

1990 Cook County Sheriff election
Party	Candidate	Votes	%
Democratic	Michael F. Sheahan	719,489	55.41
Republican	James E. O'Grady (incumbent)	369,631	28.47
Harold Washington	Tommy Brewer	191,101	14.72
Illinois Solidarity	William M. Piechuch Sr.	18,318	1.41
Total votes		1,298,539	100
