= Garry McCarthy =

American law enforcement officer and politician

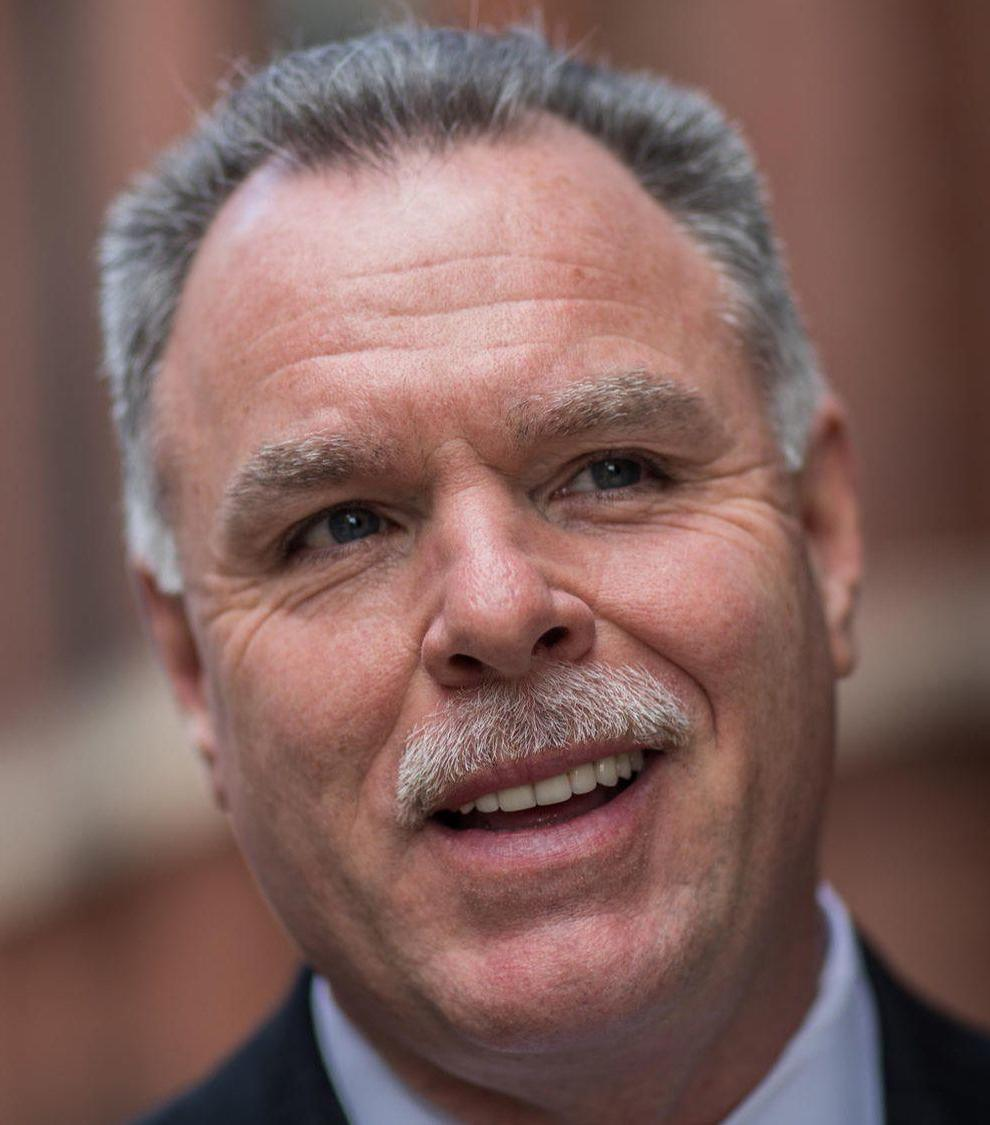
- McCarthy in 2018

61st Superintendent of the Chicago Police Department
- In office May 16, 2011 – December 1, 2015
- Appointed by: Rahm Emanuel
- Preceded by: Jody Weis; Terry G. Hillard (interim)
- Succeeded by: Eddie T. Johnson; John Escalante (interim)

Deputy Commissioner of Operations and Crime Control Strategies, New York City Police Department
- In office 2000–2006
- Commissioner: Howard Safir; Bernard Kerik; Raymond W. Kelly
- Preceded by: Ed Norris
- Succeeded by: Phil Pulaski

Personal details
- Born: Garry Francis McCarthy; May 4, 1959 (age 67) The Bronx, New York, U.S.
- Party: Democratic
- Spouse(s): Gina McCarthy (m. 1984–2014) Kristin Barnette (m. 2014)
- Children: 3
- Education: University at Albany, SUNY (BA)
- Profession: American Public Servant
- Police career
- Department: New York City (1981-2006); Newark, New Jersey (2006–2011); Chicago (2011–2015); Willow Springs (2022-present)
- Service years: 1981–present
- Rank: Police commissioner

Garry Francis McCarthy (born May 4, 1959) is an American law enforcement officer who serves as the Chief of Police of Willow Springs, Illinois. He was previously the Superintendent of the Chicago Police Department. He was a candidate for mayor of Chicago in the 2019 Chicago mayoral election.

== Early life ==
McCarthy was born and raised in the Bronx. He attended Cardinal Spellman High School and graduated in 1977. In 1981, he graduated from SUNY Albany with a BA in History.

== Law enforcement career ==
=== New York Police Department ===
McCarthy joined the New York City Police Department in 1981 at age 22. He rose through the ranks and became Deputy Commissioner of Operations in 2000, succeeding the likes of Ed Norris and Jack Maple, who implemented COMPSTAT meetings. McCarthy was in the middle of ground zero during the September 11 attacks, working closely with then-Mayor Rudy Giuliani to operate an emergency response command post. While with the NYPD, he held a variety of positions around the city, served as commander of several different precincts and eventually was in charge of the NYPD's CompStat program.

=== Newark Police Department ===
In 2006, McCarthy left his position with the New York Police Department to take over the Police Department of Newark, New Jersey. He was chosen for this role by Mayor Cory Booker, and appeared with Booker in addition to his daughter Kyla McCarthy in the documentary series Brick City. McCarthy presided over a sharp reduction in crime during his tenure in Booker's administration in Newark with homicides declining 28 percent, shootings declining 46 percent, and overall crime declining 21 percent. (During the 2020 Democratic Primary debates, Vice-President Biden nick-named McCarthy as "Giuliani's guy" in an attack towards Senator Booker.)

=== Chicago Police Department ===
McCarthy was hired by Mayor Rahm Emanuel to take over the Chicago Police Department shortly after Emanuel's election in early 2011. McCarthy was the City of Chicago's highest paid public employee, earning an annual salary of over $260,000. The number of crimes and murders in Chicago declined during his tenure (with murders declining from 525 in 2011 to 505 in 2012 to 415 in 2013). In an investigative article by Chicago Magazine reporters David Bernstein and Noah Isackson, it was asserted that the decline was in part due to the unjustified re-categorization of murders as undetermined and then if it is later determined to be a murder, tallying the total to the prior years' statistics. McCarthy responded that the article is "patently false" and criticized its reliance on anonymous sources. A 2012 audit by the Chicago Inspector General determined that the Chicago Police Department had under-counted aggravated assault and aggravated battery victims by 25 percent by not following state guidelines by counting each incident rather than each victim. McCarthy attributed the error to the administration of the prior police superintendent, Jody Weis.

==== Termination ====
On October 20, 2014, Laquan McDonald was murdered by Chicago Police Officer Jason Van Dyke. Laquan McDonald, a young black boy, was 17 years old and was shot 16 times. A cover-up of this incident occurred, lasting 400 days, yet McCarthy had seen the video footage a few days after the murder occurred. When the video was released to the public following a court order, activists condemned police violence, the code of silence, and racism in the Chicago Police Department and called on Mayor Emanuel, State's Attorney Anita Alvarez and Police Superintendent Garry McCarthy to resign. McCarthy did not resign, but was terminated by Rahm Emanuel.

=== Willow Springs Police Department ===
In April 2022, McCarthy was announced as the interim police chief of Willow Springs, Illinois, a town of 5,857 people near the Cook and DuPage county border.

== 2019 Chicago mayoral candidacy ==
On March 21, 2018, McCarthy announced he would officially run for Mayor of Chicago in the 2019 election, against incumbent Mayor Emanuel. At the time, he resided in Chicago with his three children, Kyla, Kimberly, and Kiernan.

July 2018 polling indicated that McCarthy was the leading challenger to the incumbent. In September 2018, Emanuel announced he would not be running for reelection.

McCarthy eventually conceded the election to Lori Lightfoot. His campaign had been anticipated when Emanuel was still in the race, but the dynamics changed for McCarthy when Emanuel dropped out and was no longer a target for attacks. McCarthy alluded to how more than a dozen others ran for the office when Emanuel announced he wouldn’t seek a third term. Though he had often been in the public spotlight, the race was McCarthy's first bid for public office. He now heads his own security consulting firm.

During his candidacy, when meeting with the Chicago Sun-Times editorial board unsuccessfully seeking their endorsement (which ultimately went to Lori Lightfoot), McCarthy made news for proposing, to address the issues of population loss and budgeting the city's pension obligations, that Chicago should annex nearby suburban communities such as Evergreen Park, Norridge, Oak Lawn and Oak Park. The leaders of some of the suburbs balked at the notion.

== Electoral history ==
2019 Chicago mayoral election
Candidate	General Election		Runoff Election	
Candidate	Votes	%	Votes	%
Lori Lightfoot	97,667	17.54	386,039	73.70
Toni Preckwinkle	89,343	16.04	137,765	26.30
William Daley	82,294	14.78		
Willie Wilson	59,072	10.61		
Susana Mendoza	50,373	9.05		
Amara Enyia	44,589	8.00		
Jerry Joyce	40,099	7.20		
Gery Chico	34,521	6.20		
Paul Vallas	30,236	5.43		
Garry McCarthy	14,784	2.66		
La Shawn K. Ford	5,606	1.01		
Robert "Bob" Fioretti	4,302	0.77		
John Kolzar	2,349	0.42		
Neal Sales-Griffin	1,523	0.27		
Write-ins	86	0.02		
Total	556,844	100	523,804	100

== See also ==
- Chicago Police Department
