= Jody Weis =

Superintendent of the Chicago Police Department

Jody P. Weis
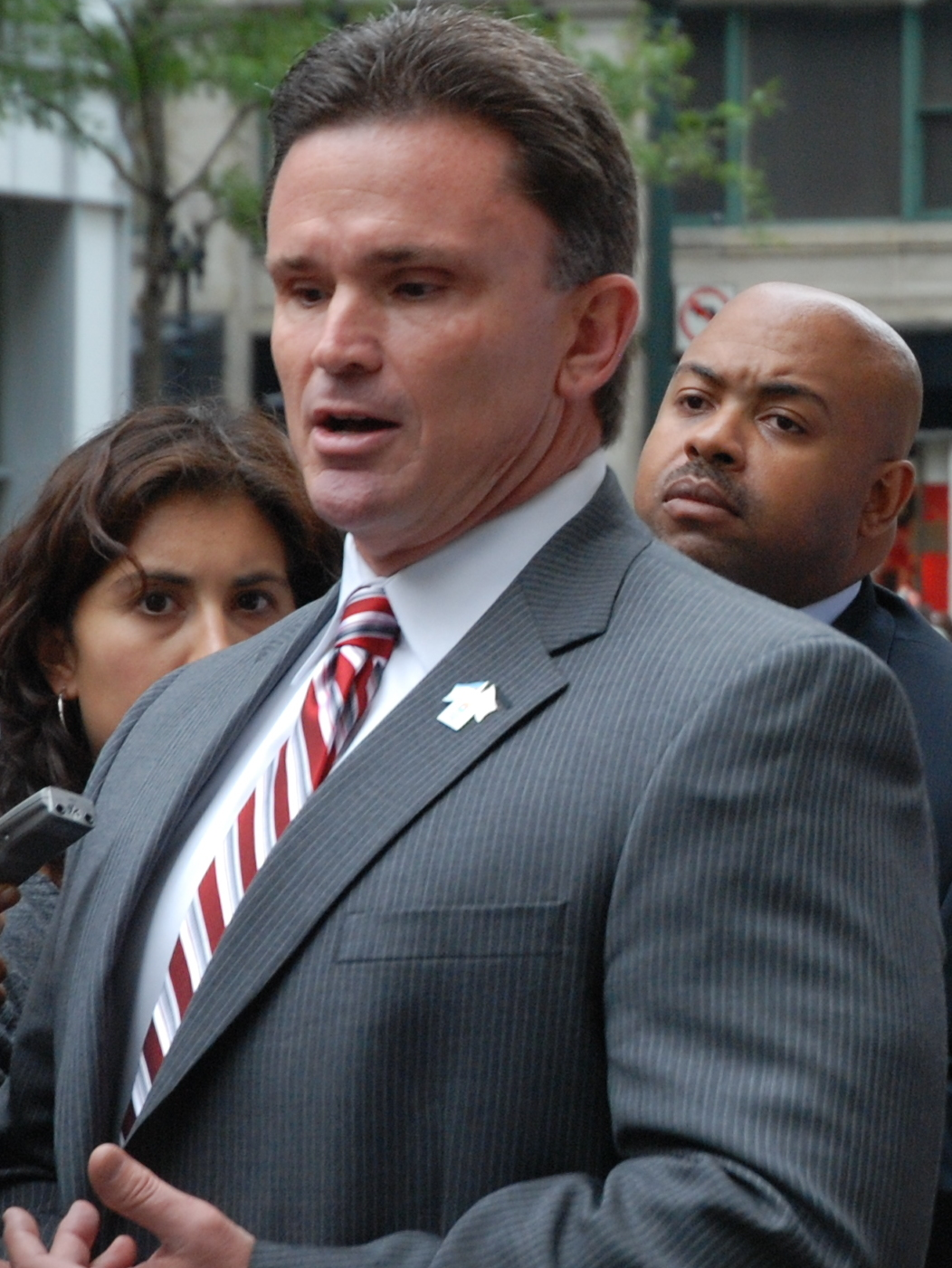
- Weis in 2009

60th Superintendent of the Chicago Police Department
- In office February 1, 2008 – March 1, 2011
- Appointed by: Richard M. Daley
- Preceded by: Phil Cline
- Succeeded by: Terry G. Hillard (interim)

Personal details
- Born: December 10, 1957 (age 68) Fort Myers, Florida, U.S.
- Education: University of Tampa
- Police career
- Department: Federal Bureau of Investigation; Chicago Police Department
- Service years: 1981–2017
- Rank: Federal agent (sworn in 1985); Superintendent (sworn in 2008)

Jody Peter "J.P." Weis (born December 10, 1957) is an American retired police officer who served as the Superintendent of Police for the Chicago Police Department. Weis was selected to serve as the 54th Superintendent of Police by Mayor Richard M. Daley. Upon his resignation and retirement, he was replaced by Interim Superintendent Terry Hillard, a predecessor. He was permanently replaced by Mayor Rahm Emanuel, who named Garry McCarthy to the post. Superintendent Weis, when he became Superintendent, had replaced former Superintendent of Police Philip J. Cline after his resignation. Superintendent Weis took office on February 1, 2008.

Weis's previous experience included 22 years in the Federal Bureau of Investigation. Weis graduated from the University of Tampa in 1979.

On March 17, 2009, a few months after the Chicago lodge of the Fraternal Order of Police announced that they would be funding the defense of Cmdr. Jon Burge, the lodge produced a vote of no-confidence in Weis.

A 2012 audit by the Chicago Inspector General determined that the Chicago Police Department had under-counted aggravated assault and aggravated battery victims by 25 percent by not following state guidelines by counting each incident rather than each victim. Police Superintendent Garry McCarthy attributed the error to the administration of his predecessor, Jody Weis.
