= Samuel Nolan =

Chicago Police Department officer and first African-American superintendent

- Nolan, c. 1979

Superintendent of the Chicago Police Department (interim)
- In office September 1, 1979 – January 11, 1980
- Mayor: Jane Byrne
- Preceded by: James E. O'Grady; Joseph DiLeonardi (interim)
- Succeeded by: Richard J. Brzeczek

Personal details
- Born: June 1, 1919 Memphis, Tennessee, U.S.
- Died: September 30, 1997 (aged 78) Hilton Head Island, South Carolina, U.S.
- Spouse: Agnes M. Nolan (m. 1938)
- Children: 3
- Police career
- Department: Chicago Police Department
- Service years: 1945−1982
- Rank: Superintendent (appointed in 1979)

Samuel W. Nolan (June 1, 1919 − September 30, 1997) was an American police officer for the Chicago Police Department who served as the interim superintendent of the department briefly from September 1, 1979 until January 11, 1980. Nolan was the first African American to serve in any capacity as head of the Chicago Police Department (it would not be until Fred Rice Jr. was appointed superintendent in August 1983 that the city of Chicago would have an African American serve as head of police in a permanent capacity).

== Biography ==
=== Chicago Police Department ===
Nolan began his career with the Chicago Police Department in 1945, serving as a foot patrol officer for three years before spending a decade as a robbery detective. Early in his tenure, he wounded two robbers in separate incidents and fired at a fleeing rapist, successfully stopping the individual. In 1962, then-superintendent Orlando Wilson appointed Nolan the head of the police department's human relations unit, established to deal with "racial, religious, or nationalistic incidents". In 1965, Nolan took a leave of absence from the police department to serve as deputy director of the Chicago Commission on Human Relations.

In July 1967, James H. Conlisk Jr., two days after taking office as police superintendent, named Nolan as deputy superintendent, heading the newly created Community Services Division. Nolan resigned from the Chicago Commission on Human Relations in order to accept this position. In taking this position, Nolan became the highest ranking black officer in the Chicago Police Department. In 1970, Nolan was named deputy superintendent for community relations. In 1975, Nolan was elected the first African American president of the Saint Jude Police League, a fraternal order for the Chicago Police Department which had 13,000 members at the time, consisting of law enforcement officers, as well as correctional and administrative employees in law enforcement in Cook County and Chicago.

Nolan had been a member for the previous 25 years. In 1977, after the Humboldt Park riot, then-mayor Michael Blandic appointed Nolan and deputy commissioner Hugh Osborne and to represent the city in meetings with Latino community groups. In July 1979, mayor Jane Byrne created the position of public safety commissioner, naming Nolan its inaugural appointee. The position saw Nolan become the second highest-salaried municipal employee, behind only the mayor herself.

==== Interim superintendent ====
On September 1, 1979, Nolan was appointed interim superintendent of police after Joseph DiLeonardi, who had been serving as interim superintendent of police, was relieved of his duty by mayor Jane Byrne. Even before Nolan became interim superintendent, there had been a push from part of the city's African American community to get Byrne to appoint Nolan the city's first black permanent police superintendent, but she did not, instead appointing Richard J. Brzeczek, a white man, as the next permanent chief of police. Nolan's term as interim superintendent ended on January 11, 1980, when Richard J. Brzeczek was appointed.

=== Later career and nonprofit work ===
After holding several positions with the Cook County Sheriff's Office, in July 1986, Nolan was named the chief of the Cook County Sheriff's Police Department. Nolan served as the director of investigations for the Illinois Attorney General. Nolan served on the boards of Loyola University Chicago, the Illinois Humane Society, and the Institute of Urban Life.

== Personal and Death ==
Nolan married his wife Agnes in March 1938 and together they had three sons; Stephen, Phillip and David. In 1993, Nolan and his wife relocated from Chicago to Hilton Head Island, South Carolina. Nolan died at his home in South Carolina on September 30, 1997, aged 78.
