= Francis O'Neill =

Collector of Irish folk music (1848–1936)

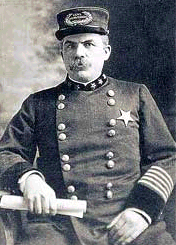

General Superintendent of the Chicago Police Department
- In office April 30, 1901 – July 24, 1905
- Mayor: Carter Harrison IV; Edward F. Dunne
- Preceded by: Joseph Kipley (permanent); John E. Ptacek (interim)
- Succeeded by: Herman F. Schuettler (acting); John M. Collins (permanent)

Personal details
- Born: August 28, 1848 Tralibane, County Cork, Ireland
- Died: January 28, 1936 (aged 87) Chicago, Illinois, United States
- Resting place: Mount Olivet Cemetery

Francis O'Neill (Irish: Proinsias Ó Néill; August 28, 1848 – January 28, 1936) was an Irish-born American police officer and collector of Irish traditional music. His biographer Nicholas Carolan referred to him as "the greatest individual influence on the evolution of Irish traditional dance music in the twentieth century".

== Life ==
O'Neill mausoleum at Mount Olivet Cemetery

O'Neill was born in Tralibane (also Trawlebane), near Bantry, County Cork. At an early age he heard the music of local musicians, among them Peter Hagarty, Cormac Murphy and Timothy Dowling. At the age of 16, he became a cabin boy on an English merchant vessel and remained a seaman until 1869. On a voyage to New York, he met Anna Rogers, a young emigrant whom he later married in Bloomington, Illinois. The O'Neills moved to Chicago, and in 1873 O'Neill became a Chicago policeman. He rose through the ranks quickly, eventually succeeding Joseph Kipley as the Chief of Police from 1901 to 1905. He had the rare distinction, in a time when political "pull" counted for more than competence, of being re-appointed three times to the position by two different mayors.

He was a fluter, fiddler, and piper and was part of the vibrant Irish community in Chicago at the time. During his time as chief, O'Neill recruited many traditional Irish musicians into the police force, including Patrick O'Mahony, James O'Neill, Bernard Delaney, John McFadden and James Early. He also collected tunes from some of the major performers of the time including Patsy Touhey, who regularly sent O'Neill wax cylinders and visited him in Chicago. He also collected tunes from a wide variety of printed sources.

O'Neill retired from the police force in 1905. After that, he devoted much of his energy to publishing the music he had collected. His musical works include:

- O'Neill's Music of Ireland (1903), containing 1,850 pieces of music
- The Dance Music of Ireland (1907), sometimes called, "O'Neill's 1001", because of the number of tunes included
- 400 tunes arranged for piano and violin (1915)
- Waifs and Strays of Gaelic Melody (1922), 365 pieces
- Irish Folk Music: A Fascinating Hobby (1910). Appendix A contains O'Farrells Treatise and Instructions on the Irish Pipes, published 1797-1800; appendix B is Hints to Amateur Pipers by Patrick J. Touhy.
- Irish Minstrels and Musicians (1913), biographies of musicians, including Thomas Garoghan and those from whom he collected tunes in Chicago.

He died at his home in Chicago on January 28, 1936, and was interred at Mount Olivet Cemetery.

== Bibliography ==
In 2008, Northwestern University Press issued Chief O'Neill's Sketchy Recollections of an Eventful Life in Chicago, a non-musical memoir edited by Ellen Skerrett and Mary Lesch (a descendant of O'Neill), with a foreword by Nicholas Carolan of the Irish Traditional Music Archive. Carolan himself wrote a musical biography of O'Neill, A Harvest Saved: Francis O'Neill and Irish Music in Chicago, which was published in Ireland by Ossian in 1997. An historical biography of O'Neill, The Beat Cop: Chicago's Chief O'Neill and the Creation of Irish Music, by Michael O'Malley, was published by the University of Chicago Press in 2022.

== Legacy ==
In 2000, a life-size monument of Francis O'Neill playing a flute was unveiled next to the O'Neill family homestead in Tralibane, Co. Cork. The monument, made by sculptor Jeanne Rynhart, and a commemorative wall were erected through the efforts of the Captain Francis O'Neill Memorial Company.

Chief O'Neill's life is memorialized in the musical play Music Mad: How Chief O'Neill Saved the Soul of Ireland, which premiered in Chicago in 2012. Written by Adam B. Whiteman with the approval and acceptance of Francis O'Neill's great-granddaughter, Mary Lesch, the show contains both dramatized content and material from O'Neill's own writings.

Peter Hagarty and Francis O'Neill are memorialized in the song "Píobaire Bán", written by Tim O'Riordan. It was recorded by Patrick O'Sullivan on the CD One More Time and on O'Riordan's own CD Taibhse.

In August 2013, the inaugural Chief O'Neill Traditional Music Festival took place in Bantry, County Cork, just a few miles from Tralibane. The 2013 event marked the centenary of the publication of O'Neill's Irish Minstrels and Musicians. The event has taken place annually since.

Chief O'Neill's Pub and Restaurant in the Avondale neighborhood bears his name and displays related memorabilia.

== Bibliography ==
- Carolan, Nicholas, A Harvest Saved: Francis O'Neill and Irish Music in Chicago (Dublin 1997)
- Cremin, Nora, Bantry Historical and Archaeological Society Journal; vol. 2
- O'Malley, Michael, The Beat Cop: Chicago's Chief O'Neill and the Creation of Irish Music (University of Chicago Press, 2022)
