= Orsemus Morrison =

American politician (1807–1864)

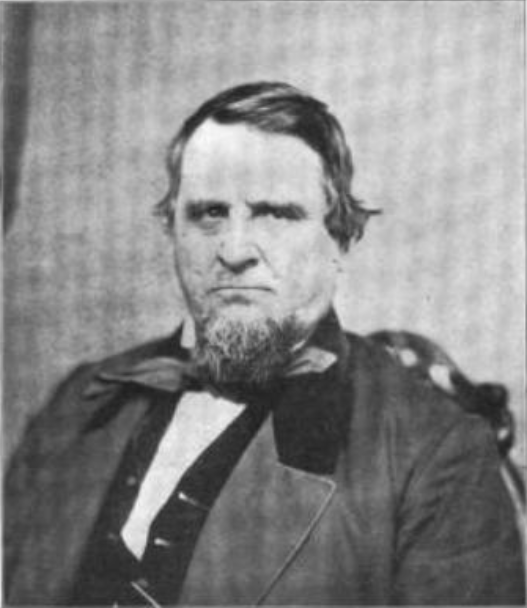

Chicago Alderman from the 1st ward
- In office 1840–1841 Serving with Julius Wadsworth
- Preceded by: James A. Smith/ Oliver H. Thompson
- Succeeded by: John Davlin/ Charles Follansbee

Coroner of Cook County
- In office 1836–1838
- Preceded by: Ashbel Steele
- Succeeded by: John K. Boyer

High Constable of Chicago
- In office August 1835 – May 2, 1837
- Preceded by: Office established
- Succeeded by: John Shrigley

Personal details
- Born: June 24, 1807 Cambridge, New York
- Died: January 4, 1864 (aged 56) Chicago, Illinois
- Resting place: Graceland Cemetery
- Spouse: Lucy Paul (m. 1836)

Orsemus Morrison (1807 – 1864) was an early settler and politician of Chicago.

== Early life ==
Morrison was born on June 24, 1807, to a family from Cambridge, New York.

== Career ==
After working on the construction of the Erie Canal, he moved from Buffalo, New York, to Chicago in early 1833.

His early work in Chicago was as a carpenter and contractor. One project he worked on was dredging the mouth of the Chicago River.

On August 15, 1835 he was elected the first High Constable and High Collector of Chicago. As High Constable, he was the city's first head of police from his election until May 2, 1837.

He was elected the Cook County Coroner in August 1836, having been nominated by the Democratic Party.

Morrison was elected and served as street commissioner. From 1840 to 1841, he served as an alderman from the 1st ward of Chicago.

In 1838, he purchased land on the corner of Clark and Madison in Chicago. This later became the location of the Morrison Hotel, the original building of which was built in 1860. He made a number of other real estate purchases in Chicago.

A Whig, originally, Morrison became an early member of the Republican Party.

== Personal life ==
He was married to the former Lucy Paul on April 7, 1836, in Aurora, Erie County, New York. Morrison died in Chicago on January 4, 1864, and was buried at Graceland Cemetery. When he died, he was survived by two daughters, Hannah Spofford and Lucy Mills, the latter of whom was married to congressman Daniel W. Mills.
