= Trawlebane =

Townland in County Cork, Ireland

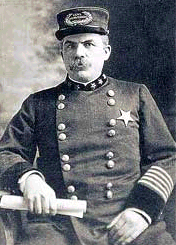
Chicago Police Chief Francis O'Neill 1901–1905

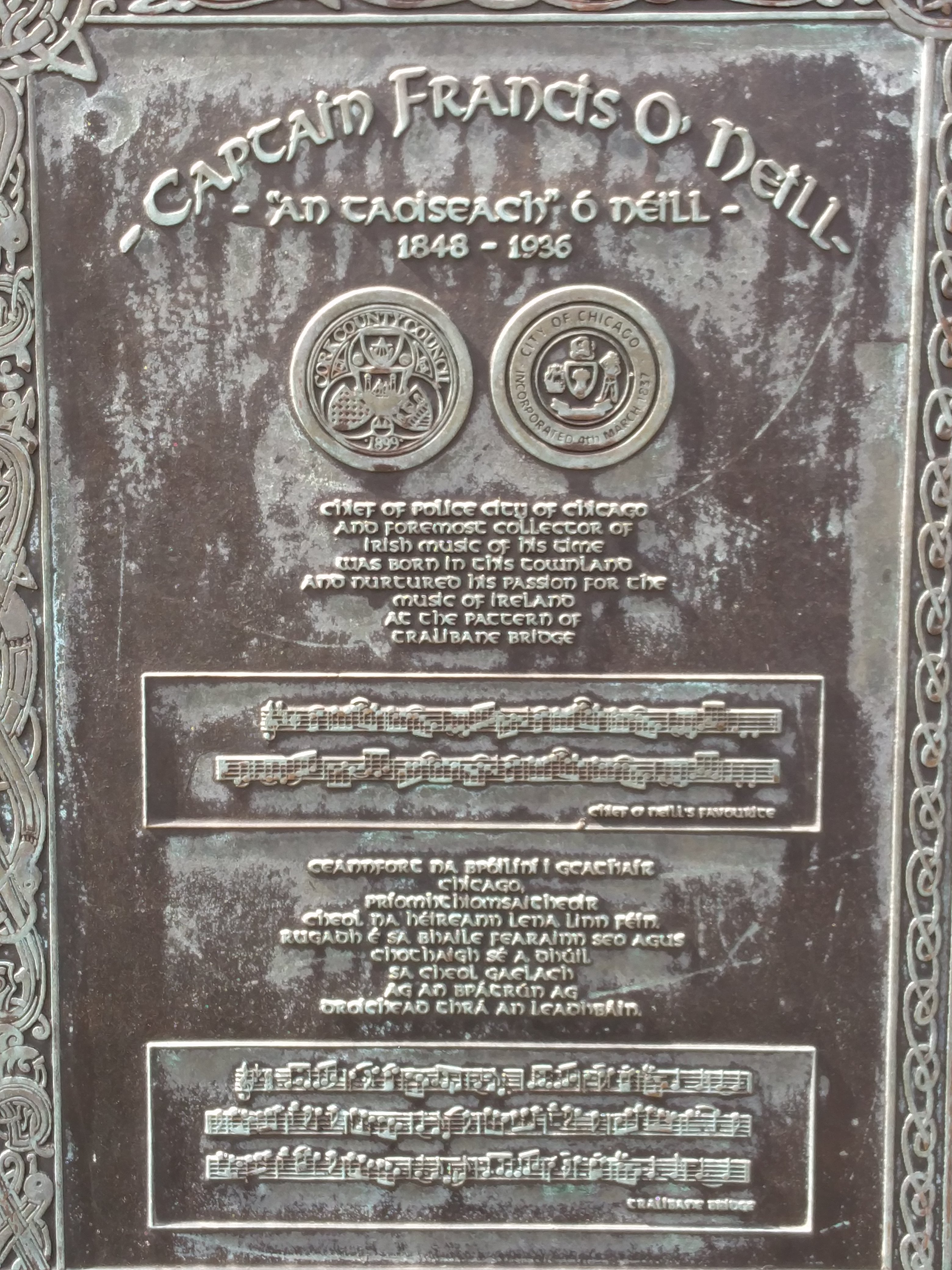
Plaque near Tralibane Bridge, County Cork, Ireland, honouring the memory of Francis O'Neill

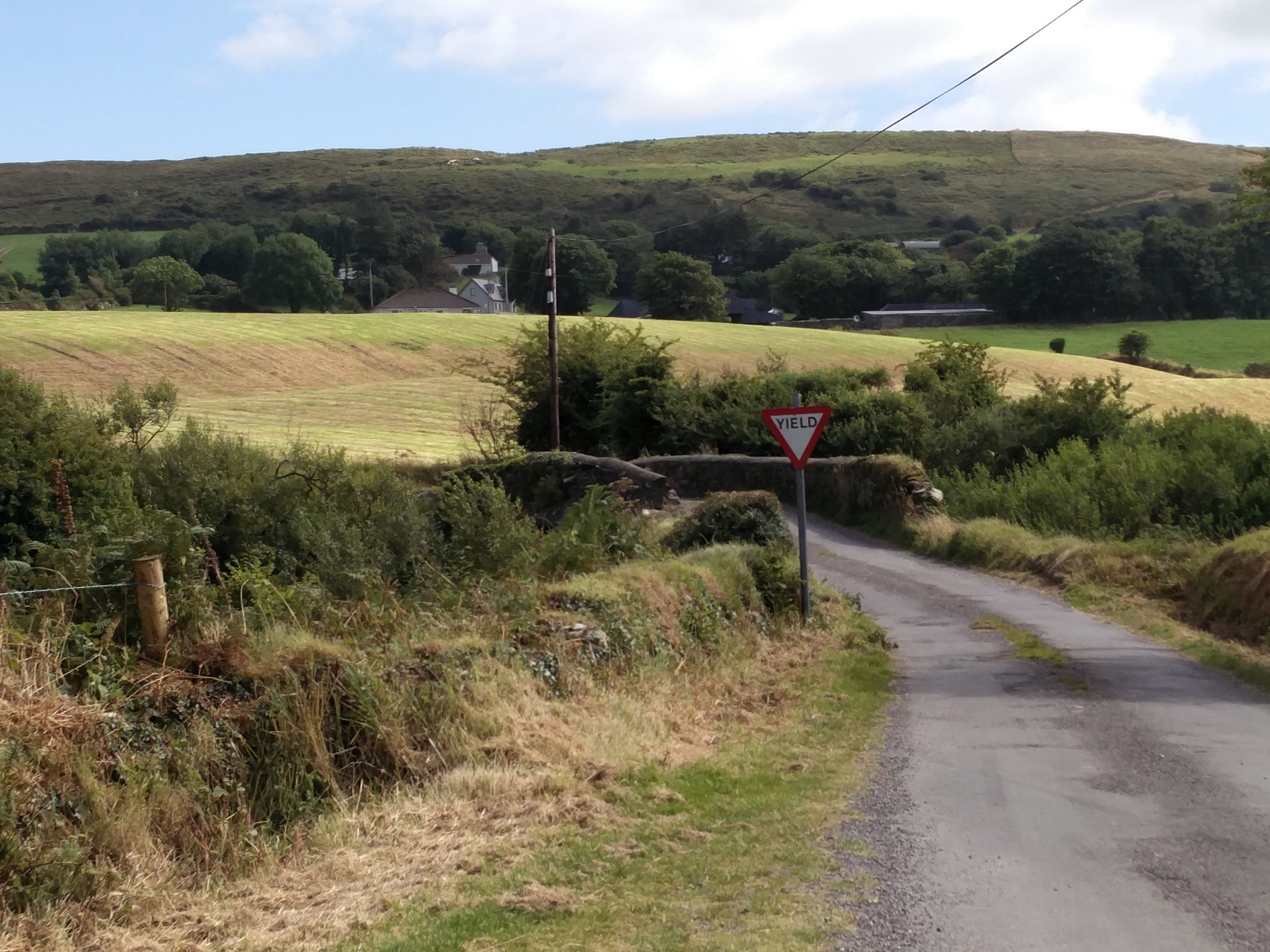
Tralibane Bridge

Trawlebane (also Tralibane; Irish: Trá Líobáin, meaning 'Liban's beach or strand') is a townland in western County Cork, Ireland. Birthplace to Francis O'Neill (1848-1936). O'Neill grew up on his family farm near the bridge. There is a bronze plaque in his honour near the bridge in Trawlebane. Not far from the bridge is a statue of Francis O'Neill along with other commemorative plaques. The area is officially known as "Trawlebane" although O'Neill spelled it "Tralibane". Today, it is described as being in the Electoral Division of Gortnascreeny, in Civil Parish of Caheragh, in the Barony of West Carbery (West Division), in the County of Cork.

== Location ==
The nearest large town to Trawlebane is Bantry. The Kerry border is further west.

== Prehistoric Monuments ==
There is a Standing Stone located in this townland at 51°40′23″N 9°23′12.2″W. A five stone circle is also nearby.
