= Thomas Garoghan =

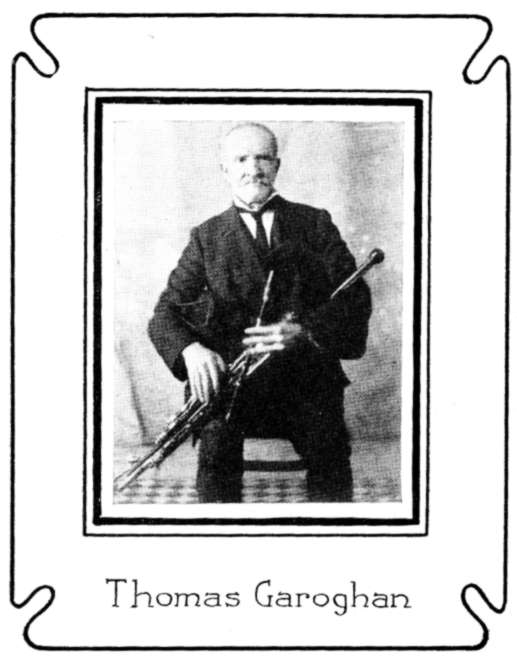

Thomas Garoghan (1849–1922) was an English born Irish uilleann piper.

Garoghan was born in Coventry to parents from County Mayo, and learned the pipes from James O'Rourke (piper) of Birmingham and Michael McGlynn (piper) of Aughamore. He was a fluent Irish speaker, having learned the language from his parents.

Thomas died in Poplar in Feb 1922.

He was a great uncle of James Callaghan, prime minister of the UK 1976–1979.

Captain Francis O'Neill included a photograph of him in his book of 1913, and remarked of him:

One of the pleasant surprises which conduced to render the Oireachtas of 1912 particularly interesting and enjoyable, was the introduction of Thomas Garoghan, the London piper, to a Dublin audience. He played on a full set of boxwood pipes, and according to one account, the performance was "splendid and refined, but the tone of his instrument was too weak to be effective in a large concert hall". He did not have his pipes with him at the little assembly at Groome’s hotel, but on the stage of the Rotunda each evening his music was much admired, and by uttering intelligibly on the chanter, "Polly put the kettle on", the unique trick aroused the audience to enthusiasm.
