= Morrison Hotel (Chicago) =

Skyscraper in Illinois, United States

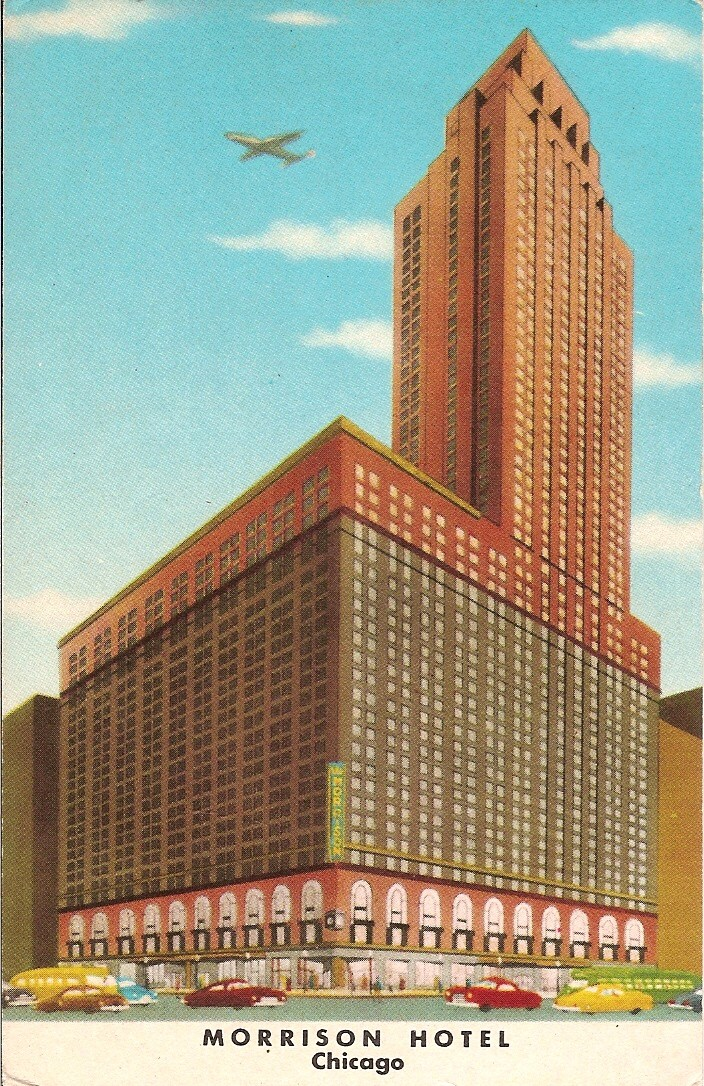
- 20th century postcard of the Morrison Hotel.
- Interactive map of the Morrison Hotel area

General information
- Status: Demolished
- Type: hotel
- Location: 15–29 South Clark Street; Chicago, Illinois
- Coordinates: 41.8816°N 87.6301°W
- Completed: First building: 1860; Second building: circa 1871; Third building: 1915 (initial construction); 1918, 1925, and 1930s (expansions)
- Demolished: 1871 (first building); 1915 (second building); 1965 (third building and its expansions)

Height
- Roof: 526.1 feet (160.4 m)

Technical details
- Floor count: 45

Design and construction
- Architect: Holabird & Roche

The Morrison Hotel was a high rise hotel at the corner of Madison and Clark streets in the downtown Loop community area of Chicago, Illinois. Its final iteration was designed by the architectural firm of Holabird & Roche and completed in 1915, with several additions later added. The hotel was demolished in 1965 to make room for the First National Plaza (now Chase Tower).

The hotel was named for Orsemus Morrison, the first coroner in Chicago, who bought the site in 1838 and in 1860 built a three-story hotel with 21 rooms that was destroyed in the Great Chicago Fire of 1871 and replaced by an eight-story building that opened in 1873. A third and much larger 21-floor structure was constructed in 1915 to replace the one that burned. It saw numerous expansions (including the addition of a 46-story skyscraper) before being demolished.

== Location, structures, and ownership ==
The hotel was located in the Chicago Loop located south of the main branch of the Chicago River at the corner of Clark Street and Madison Street. The land the hotel stood on was first purchased by Orsemus Morrison in 1838. Morrison built the hotel's original structure in 1860 as a modest edifice, standing three stories and 21 rooms. The original building and all of its business records were lost to the Great Chicago Fire in 1871.

Two years after the first building was destroyed, a new eight-story Morrison Hotel was opened.

In 1915 Harry C. Moir, who had bought the property from Morrison's nephew, replaced the hotel's structure with a 21-floor, 500-room facility designed by Marshall and Fox. This third iteration of the hotel was expanded in 1918 to 650 rooms. In 1925 a further expansion designed by the firm Holabird & Roche was constructed, adding a 46-story tower. The hotel had 1,800 rooms by 1931. A fourth, 21-story section was then added, bringing the number of rooms to 2,210, but was sold in 1937, becoming the Hotel Chicagoan; in the 1950s this was operated under lease by the Morrison. In 1952 a syndicate bought the Morrison and renovated it. Presidents, such as Truman, Eisenhower, and Kennedy, and vice-presidents Barkley and Nixon stayed at the hotel during this era. Boxer Jack Dempsey was also a frequent guest, and Gorgeous George was a daily client of the beauty parlor in the hotel. From 1932 onwards, the headquarters of the Cook County Democratic machine was on the third floor of the Morrison.

At the time it was demolished in 1965, the hotel was owned by First National Bank of Chicago. The company demolished the building with initial plans to replace it with a $60 million skyscraper that would have featured a new Morrison Hotel facility. 3 acres (1.2 ha) of adjacent property had been acquired by the company ahead of the demolition. Standing 526 feet (160 m) high, the Morrison Hotel was the first building outside of New York City to have more than 40 floors, and for thirty years was the world's tallest hotel. At the time of its razing in 1965, it was the tallest building to have ever been demolished anywhere in the world. At the time it was demolished, it was still the tallest hotel in Chicago.

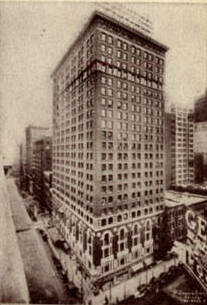
The Morrison Hotel, 1933

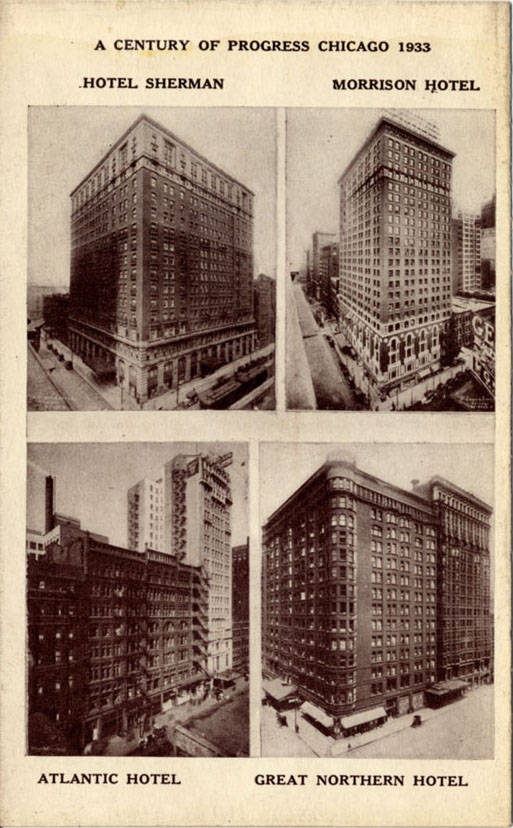
1933 postcard depicting the Morrison along with the Sherman House Hotel (demolished 1973) and the Great Northern Hotel (demolished 1940).

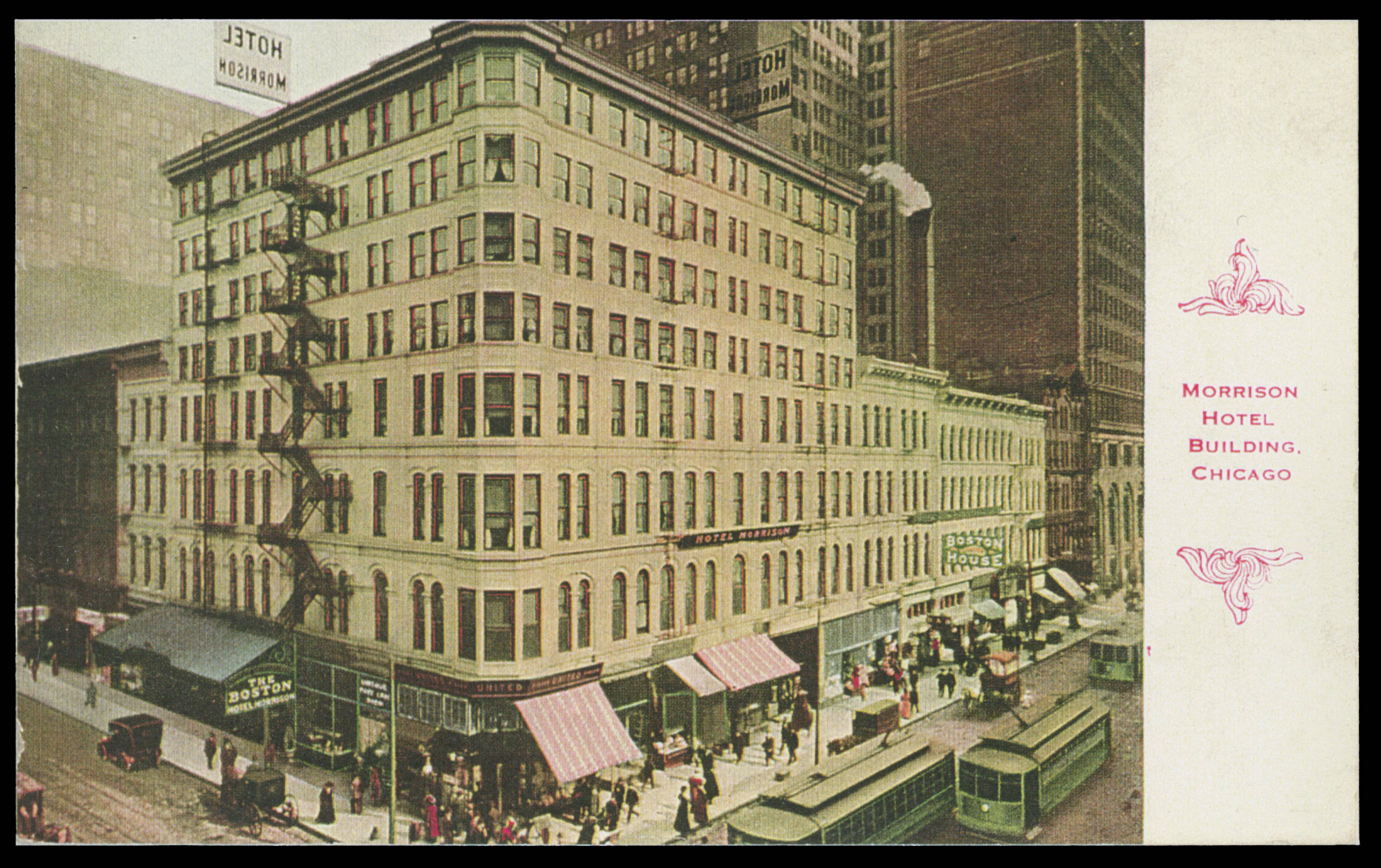
1912 postcard of the Hotel Morrison.

== Restaurants, nightclubs, ballroom, and other venues ==
The same year that the second structure opened, John S. Wilson opened the Boston Oyster House restaurant in its basement. This restaurant carried over into the third hotel structure and was a long-operating midwestern seafood establishment.

The Terrace Casino (one of the skyscraper hotel's main nightlife venues) opened its doors in 1936 with a performance by Sophie Tucker and was an important Big Band venue; the Carousel in the Sky was the world's highest nightclub; the Jockey Club on the first floor was the site of protests by the National Association for the Advancement of Colored People that forced removal of its black jockey statues.

== Notable events ==
Amid the flagpole sitting fad of the 1920s, Joe "Hold 'Em" Powers spent a world record 16 days on the hotel flagpole in 1927 (during which time he lost six teeth when wind blew him into cables). In 1931, the Air Line Pilots Association held its founding meeting in the hotel's ballroom. In June 1937, the hotel served as the location in which the Chicago Herald-Examiner kept the notorious murderer Robert Irwin sequestered while negotiating terms of his surrender to authorities in Manhattan. The Morrison Hotel would also host the second ever NBA draft via the 1948 BAA draft (the BAA ((Basketball Association of America)) being a predecessor of the modern-day NBA through merger with the National Basketball League) on May 10, 1948 after previously hosting their first draft at the Leland Hotel in Detroit, Michigan.

== See also ==
- List of tallest voluntarily demolished buildings
