= Frederick Ebersold =

American law enforcement officer (1841–1900)

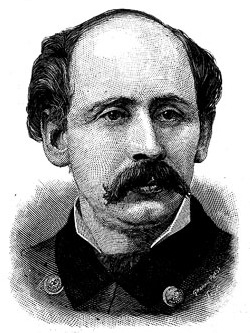

General Superintendent of the Chicago Police Department
- In office October 15, 1885 – February 14, 1888 (Interim from October 15–26, 1885)
- Mayor: Carter Harrison Sr. John A. Roche
- Preceded by: Augstin J. Doyle
- Succeeded by: George W. Hubbard; Frederick H. Marsh (interim)

Personal details
- Born: March 30, 1841 Ixheim, Zweibrücken, Kingdom of Bavaria
- Died: January 21, 1900 (aged 58) Chicago, Illinois

Fredrick Ebersold (March 30, 1841 – January 21, 1900) was an American law enforcement officer who served as General Superintendent of the Chicago Police Department. He is noted for having been at the helm of the Chicago Police Department during the Haymarket affair.

== Early life ==
Ebersold was born March 30, 1841, in Ixheim, in Zweibrücken, Bavaria. His parents were Louis Ebersold and Elizabeth Ebersold (née Schmidt. His father was a contractor. On February 6, 1856, both of his parents died of separate incurable ailments on the same day. Thus, he was orphaned at the age of fifteen. He opted to join his aunt and older brother in the United States. Setting sail from Le Havre, France in September 1856, he arrived in America and spent several months living with his aunt in New York City, New York, before moving to Chicago, Illinois, to live with his brother. His brother was an architect. He arrived in Chicago in February 1857.

== Career ==
In February 1857, he began working for the furniture dealer J. J. West as an apprentice as well as a varnisher and finisher. After West sold his company in 1859, Ebersold moved to Mendota, Illinois, where he spent two years managing a large warehouse business which primarily health with coal and grain.

=== Union military service in the United States Civil War ===
At the beginning of the United States Civil War, Ebersold joined the 12th Illinois Infantry, enlisting on May 19, 1861, and serving three months as a corporal of his company. His regiment was first assigned to duty in East St. Louis, Illinois, and then was assigned to duty in Cairo, Illinois. In Cairo, he took sick and returned to Chicago in August. He attempted to reenlist, but was unsuccessful. He then, briefly, returned to Mendota.

Only a single month after Ebersold left service in the 12th Illinois Infantry, he enlisted as a private with the private company "I" in the 55th Illinois Volunteer Infantry Regiment. He would ultimately be promoted through the ranks up to captain. For all but three months of his service. he served under William Tecumseh Sherman, with the other three months of his service being under General Benjamin Prentiss. Ebersold recruited 38 other men for the regiment, and was made forth sergeant upon the organization of the regiment. Soon afterwards, at Paducah, Kentucky, he was promoted to second or first duty sergeant.

After the capture of Ford Donelson, his regiment took part in the expedition to Columbus, Kentucky. Then, on March 8, 1862, they embarked on a steamship up the Tennessee River. In Battle of Shiloh, in which his regiment suffered heavy casualties, he escaped from being hit by a shell unscathed, but was subsequently wounded by another shell in the left hand, across his shoulders, in his left breast and right arm. After this battle, on either April 8 or April 9, 1862, he was made an orderly sergeant, and held this position for eleven months.

In May 1862, Ebersold took part with his regiment in the Siege of Corinth.

At the Battle of Chickasaw Bayou, he was made second lieutenant, but would not formally receive his commission until April 1863. He took part with his regiment in the Battle of Arkansas Post in July 1863. He then took part in the Battle of Champion Hill in May 1863. Ebersold then took part with his company in the Siege of Vicksburg. After this, he was promoted to a first lieutenancy, and traveled from Vicksburg to Mission Ridge and Knoxville, Tennessee.

Ebersold and his regiment took part in the fight at Tuscumbia, Alabama, on August 27, 1863, on their way to Chattanooga, Tennessee, to reinforce forces led by William Rosecrans. In November 1863, they took part in the Battle of Missionary Ridge.

Ebersold reenlisted in the Spring of 1864 after his three years of service had expired. He was then unanimously elected the first lieutenant of his company.

During the Atlanta campaign, he primarily was in charge of the "A" and "E" companies. He was made a captain around this time. During the campaign and his company took part in the Battle of Kennesaw Mountain on June 27, Lovell Rousseau's raid of Decatur, Georgia, on July 22, the Battle of Ezra Church on July 28, the Battle of Jonesborough on August 31.

After the Atlanta Campaign, the 55th Illinois Volunteer Infantry Regiment went to camp at East Point, and then followed the Confederate Army troops of John Bell Hood to Gainesville, Florida, before returning to Vinging Station. After this, they joined General Sherman on Sherman's March to the Sea. The regiment engaged in the Battle of Fort McAllister. They then engaged in some warm work at Beaufort, South Carolina. On February 9, 1865, they entered battle at the South Edisto River, and partook in battle at Charleston, South Carolina, on February 15 and 16 (with the Union capturing Charleston two days after).

The regiment served with Sherman through Confederate General Robert E. Lee's surrender at the Battle of Appomattox Court House.

Ebersold was discharged at Little Rock, Arkansas, on August 14, 1865, and received his payment on August 25, 1865. He returned to Chicago, but in bad health.

=== Chicago Police Department career ===
After spending some time in the commission business, and losing his money in a flour feed business, Ebersold joined the force of the Chicago Police Department on July 9, 1867. He began as a patrolman, signed to the Armory police station.

Ebersold joined the day squad at the Central station in 1868. He was first appointed to duty at the Rush Street Bridge. After navigation on the River closed for the winter, he was sent back to the Armory police station, where he worked until the following may when he was placed again on the day squad, where he worked at the Washington Street Tunnel for eleven months. He became sick due to the dampness of the tunnel, and was reassigned to the Randolph Street Bridge. He was subsequently reassigned to the intersection of Lake and 5th. After this he was assigned to the headquarters, where he acted as an interpreter and operated a dial telegraph machine and completed work typically performed by station-keepers.

He became a sergeant and was assigned to the 22nd street district on May 4, 1872. He remained there, until he was moved to the Armory station, at its new location. When the department created the rank of lieutenant, he was made on.

In June 1875, after the crime boss Ed "Big Ed" Burns had been shot, Ebersold first ran after Burns thinking he had been the one shooting. After Burns pointed out Charlie Powers to have been the assailant, Ebersold ran after Powers, but was shot at by powers (with a bullet making its way through Ebersold's clothing).

Ebersold, once, when arresting a criminal that went by the moniker of "Cranky Bill", had his gun stolen by the arrestee, who turned the gun on him.

Ebersold was a lieutenant during the Chicago railroad strike of 1877 and led officers in confronting the mobs.

Ebersold became captain of the first precinct on August 1, 1879. Ebersold was then moved to command the second precinct in August 1880, and subsequently moved to command the third precinct in December 1880. In August 1885, he was placed in command of the day squad for the district. On April 22, 1884, he was again placed in command of the first district.

In August 1885, he was appointed inspector of police.

==== General Superintendent of Police ====
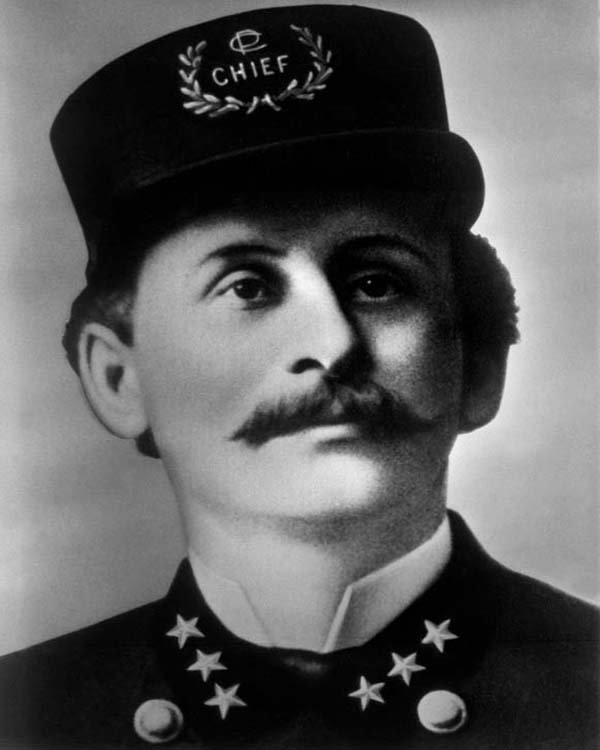
Ebersold as general superintendent of the Chicago Police Department

On October 15, 1885, Augstin J. Doyle resigned as General Superintendent of Police, and Ebersold became interim General Superintendent of Police. He was permanently appointed as General Superintendent on October 26, 1885.

Early into his tenure, he was popular and well-regarded. Mayor Carter Harrison Sr.'s appointment of Ebersold as General Superintendent was a popular choice with the city's business community, as well as among the city's German populace. However, it was not a selection that was popular among ambitious senior officers such as John Bonfield (who replaced Ebersold as inspector once Ebersold became General Superintendent) and Michael Schaak, who did not respect Ebersold's authority.

Ebersold is regarded by some to have been a very able leader of the police force. However, others viewed his leadership as uneasy.

Throughout his tenure, the Chicago Police Department was understaffed given both the size of Chicago and the large number of crimes being committed there, as well as considering the labor tensions of the era. In 1886, when Chicago's population was approximately 825,000, just over 1,000 cops were employed.

Ebersold was commended by some for how he handled his officers in the perilous days leading up to the Haymarket affair.

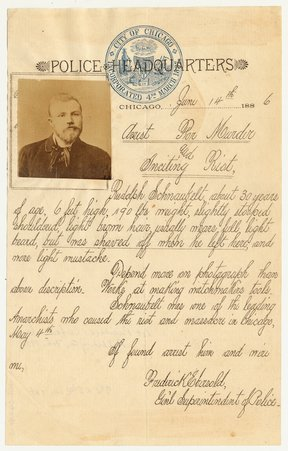
Arrest warrant issued by Ebersold for Rudolph Schnaubelt, who was a suspect for the bombing at the Haymarket Affair

Ebersold resigned February 14, 1888.

=== Subsequent life ===
Ebersold died January 21, 1900, in Chicago. He was buried at Rosehill Cemetery.
