= William McClaughry =

- Occupations: Farmer, landowner
- Spouses: Catherine Clinton; Agnes Humphrey (m. 1763)
- Children: None

William McClaughry was an American man who was one of three former slaves who became upstate land barons during the post-American Revolutionary War period, when most African-Americans were still enslaved.

== Life ==
William Thomas and John McClaughry were owned by James McClaughry, a popular resident and an officer in the Continental Army. McClaughry's attitudes towards slavery changed after he was wounded and captured during a battle in 1777 with British and Hessian forces near Fort Montgomery, New York. McClaughry spent the rest of the war in a British prison in New York City. Most prisoners were soon exchanged, or paroled, but McClaughry was not and suffered sufficiently to deepen and broaden his hatred for the English. After being released, McClaughry freed all his slaves except two women, who were retained for his wife. In addition to freedom, McClaughry gave his former slaves oxen, farming implements, etc., and from 180 to 200 pounds each, which they used to purchase land.

William and John McClaughry, both of whom were formerly enslaved, acquired large real estate holdings-almost 500 acres of fertile farmland in Walkill, Orange County, New York. The McClaughrys called their land "Guinea", which in their native language means "Africa". The name "McClaughry" was kept by several "Colored" families in the district. They were considered the better class, generally thrifty and well-to-do.

William McClaughry was married twice. His first wife was Catherine Clinton, daughter of Charles Clinton and sister of George Clinton, New York State's first governor. She died in 1762. McClaughry married Agnes Humphrey a year later. He had no children.

It is unclear whether the three McClaughrys were related.
