= Fred Rice Jr. =

Chicago Police Department officer and first permanent African-American superintendent

- Rice Jr., c. 1983.

55th Superintendent of the Chicago Police Department
- In office August 27, 1983 – November 1, 1987
- Mayor: Harold Washington
- Preceded by: James E. O'Grady (interim)
- Succeeded by: LeRoy Martin

Personal details
- Born: December 24, 1926 Chicago, Illinois
- Died: January 10, 2011 (aged 84) Palos Heights, Illinois
- Spouse: Thelma Dean Martin (m. 1955)
- Children: 2; including Judith
- Education: Roosevelt University

Military service
- Allegiance: United States
- Branch/service: United States Army
- Years of service: 1950–1952
- Battles/wars: Korean War

Fred Rice Jr. (December 24, 1926 – January 10, 2011) was an American police officer for the Chicago Police Department who also served as superintendent of the department from August 1983 until November 1987. Rice is noted as the first permanent African-American to head the Chicago Police Department (Samuel Nolan was the first African-American to serve as superintendent in an interim capacity, doing so from late–1979 until January 1980).

== Early life ==
Rice was born December 24, 1926, in Chicago to Leola Mosely and Fred Rice Sr. Rice was raised in the Bronzeville neighborhood of Chicago. Rice attended John Farren Elementary School and Edward Hartigan Elementary School before graduating from DuSable High School (now known as DuSable Leadership Academy) in 1944.

Years after high school, Rice served in the United States Army for two years in the Korean War, from 1950 to 1952. Rice received two battle stars, a combat infantry badge, and special commendation from the government of South Korea. Prior to passing Chicago Park District police examination in 1955, Rice worked for the United States Postal Service in Chicago.

== Police career ==
In 1955, Rice took a job as a patrol officer in the Chicago Park District police force, which was merged with the Chicago Police Department in 1959, at which time he joined the Chicago Police Department. During his time as a police officer, Rice received his undergraduate and master's degree from Roosevelt University, and also graduated from the Federal Bureau of Investigation's Federal Executive Institute. Rice rose up the ranks of the police department. Rice was promoted to the role of sergeant, and later to the role of civil service captain. By early 1983, Rice had become the department's chief of patrol.

=== Superintendent of the Chicago Police Department ===
On August 27, 1983, Rice was appointed Superintendent of the Chicago Police Department by Harold Washington, first African-American mayor of Chicago, who had only been sworn in as mayor months earlier. The department was overwhelming White. Rice was the first African-American person to serve as permanent head of the Chicago Police Department (before him, Samuel Nolan served as interim superintendent for a few weeks in 1979 and 1980).

Washington sought to see the department reformed, including ending the de facto racial segregation within the force. Rice's efforts to implement integration within the police patrols was met with resistance from rank-and-file officers, who protested by slowing down ticket-writing. With the backing of the mayor, Rice stood up to this resistance.

Rice was named in a number of lawsuits where former ranking White officers alleged discrimination, arguing that they had been demoted because they were White and had politically opposed Harold Washington. However, Rice, was cleared in courts of any wrongdoing. Rice's tenure saw a decrease in the departments use of firearms, and a decrease in the number of disorderly conduct arrests, which had been considered a cause of tension between the police and the populations of minority neighborhoods. Rice was a founding member of the National Organization of Black Law Enforcement Executives. Rice retired as superintendent effective November 1, 1987, ending his 32-year career as a Chicago police officer.

== Subsequent career ==
After retiring from the Chicago Police Department in 1987, Rice served as an adjunct professor of criminal justice at the University of Illinois Chicago from 1990 until 2001.

== Personal life and death ==
Rice was married once and had two children. From 1955 until his death, Rice was married to Thelma Dean Martin. Together, they had two children, a son named Lyle and a daughter named Judith. In 2001, Rice was diagnosed with lung cancer. After an almost ten-year long battle with the cancer, Rice died January 10, 2011, at ManorCare Health Services in Palos Heights, Illinois. Rice was buried at Oak Woods Cemetery in Chicago.
