= Robert Wilson McClaughry =

Warden and Superintendent of Chicago Police

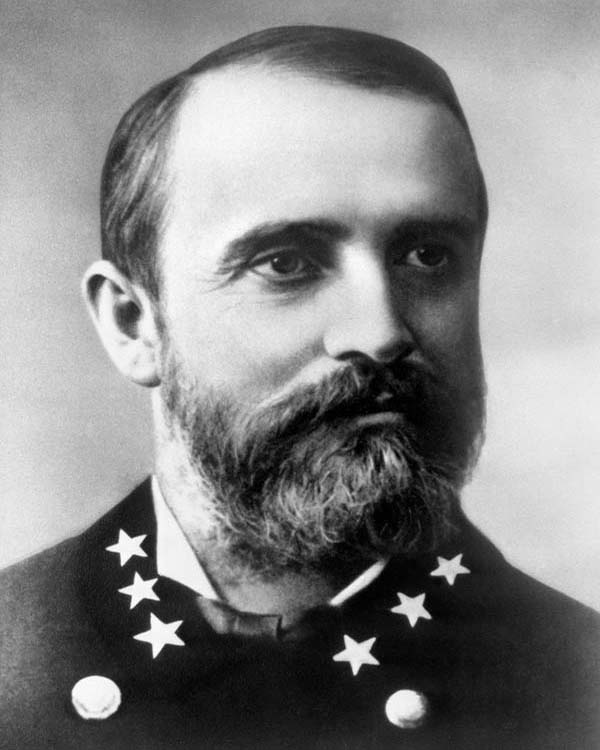

Warden of Leavenworth Prison
- In office July 1, 1899 – June 30, 1913

General Superintendent of the Chicago Police Department
- In office May 18, 1891 – May 1893
- Mayor: Hempstead Washburne; Carter Harrison Sr.
- Preceded by: Frederick H. Marsh
- Succeeded by: Michael Brennan

Personal details
- Born: July 22, 1839 Fountain Green, Hancock County, Illinois, United States
- Died: November 9, 1920 (aged 81) Chicago, Illinois
- Resting place: Monmouth Cemetery, Monmouth, Illinois
- Education: Monmouth College
- Occupation: Warden, prison reformer
- Known for: Remedial prison reform

Robert Wilson McClaughry (July 22, 1839 – November 9, 1920) was an early leader in modern penal reform and the warden of several major penitentiaries including the United States Penitentiary at Leavenworth, Kansas. He was one of the early advocates of remedial instead of purely retributive treatment, and was closely associated with noted prison reformers such as Z. R. Brockway, of New York; General Brinkerhoff, of Ohio, and the two Dr. Wines, of Illinois. He was also General Superintendent of the Chicago Police Department from 1891 to 1893.

== Biography ==
Born on July 22, 1839, at Fountain Green, Hancock county, Illinois of Scotch-Irish ancestry, he attended public schools near his father's farm. He graduated with honors from Monmouth College in Illinois in 1860.

He worked for a year as a professor of Latin at Monmouth College, then as the proprietor of the Carthage Republican newspaper and then enlisted in the 118th Illinois Volunteer Infantry where he became the Captain of Company B. In 1862 he was mustered as Major and participated in the expedition to Vicksburg. He mustered out as Paymaster in October 1865. He campaigned for the re-election of U.S. President Abraham Lincoln before starting his life's work as a warden and penal reformer.

In August 1874, he was appointed warden of the Illinois State Penitentiary at Joliet. Fourteen years later he was invited to open and organize the Pennsylvania Industrial Reformatory at Huntington. In August 1893, he was made Superintendent of the Illinois State Reformatory at Pontiac followed by a return to Joliet as warden there in March 1897. On July 1, 1899, U.S. President William McKinley personally solicited him to be warden of the United States Penitentiary in Leavenworth, Kansas where he served until June 30, 1913.

He was a pioneer "in creating reliable identification records systems and was ready to implement and evaluate new techniques as they became available. McClaughry was the first person to introduce Bertillonage into the United States in 1887… and he persuaded the Warden's Association of the United States and Canada to adopt the system in the same year."

A Presbyterian, McClaughry died in Chicago on November 9, 1920. His body was transferred to Monmouth, Illinois for interment where services were held by The Rev. Dr. Thomas Hanna McMichael, President of Monmouth College, on Nov. 20, 1920.
