= Joseph Kipley =

Head of the Chicago Police Department (b. 1848, d. 1904)

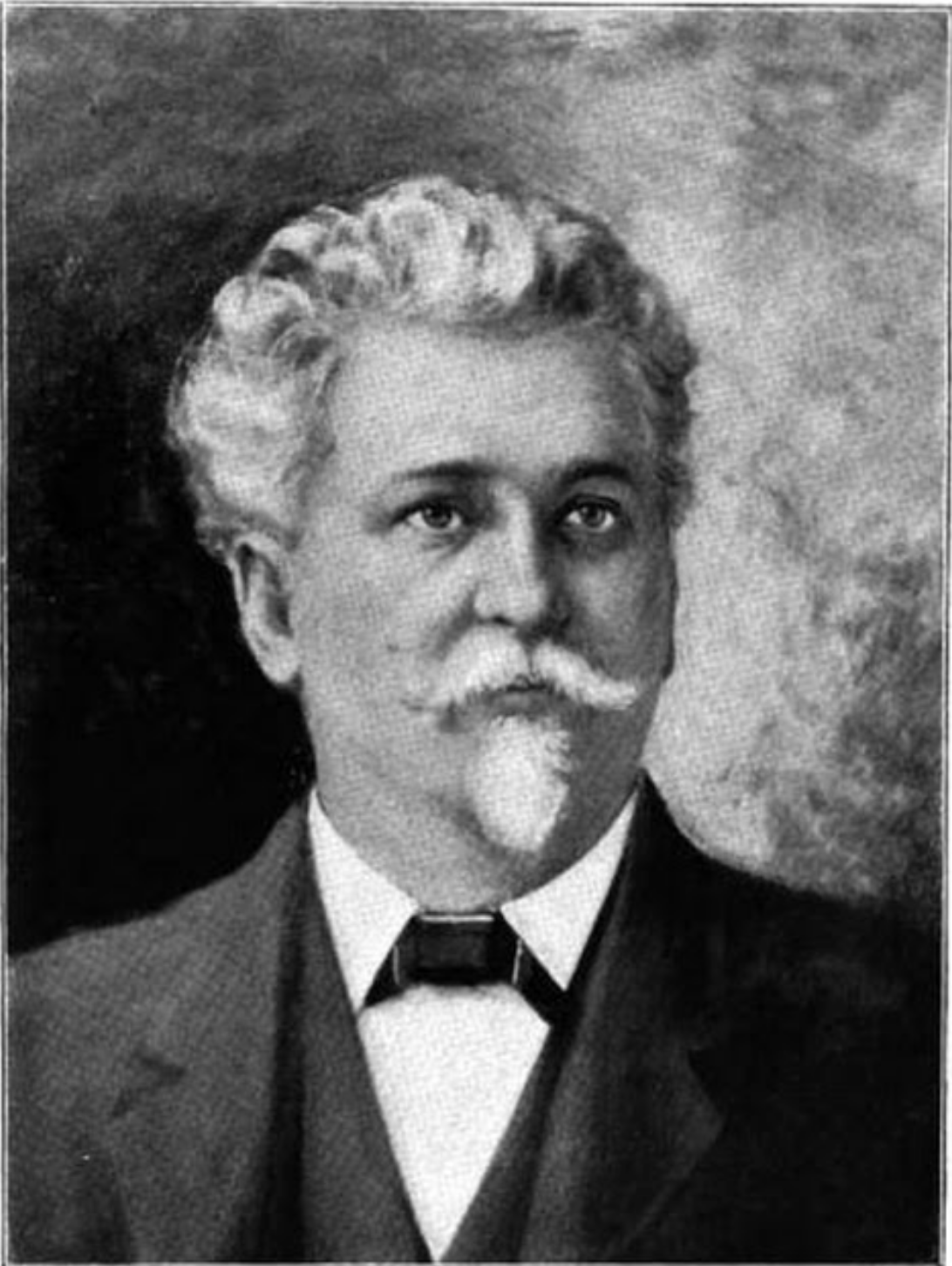
- Portrait of Joseph Kipley

33rd Head of the Chicago Police Department
- In office 1897–1901
- Appointed by: Carter Harrison IV
- Preceded by: John J. Badenoch
- Succeeded by: Francis O'Neill

Personal details
- Born: Joseph Kipley; November 25, 1848 Paterson, New Jersey
- Died: February 6, 1904 (aged 55) Chicago, Illinois
- Party: Democratic
- Spouse: Winefred Helen Wheeler (m. 1872)
- Children: 3
- Profession: Police
- Committees: Star League
- Police career
- Department: Chicago Police Department
- Service years: 1871–1901
- Rank: General Superintendent of Police
- Other work: author of The Ice Pond Mystery

Superintendent Joseph Kipley (November 25, 1848 – February 6, 1904) was Head of the Chicago Police Department from 1897 to 1901. He succeeded John J. Badenoch and was succeeded by Francis O'Neill.

== Early life ==
Kipley was born in Paterson, New Jersey, in 1848. He moved to Chicago in 1865. He worked at a picture frame factory which burned down in the Great Chicago Fire in October 1871.

== Police career ==
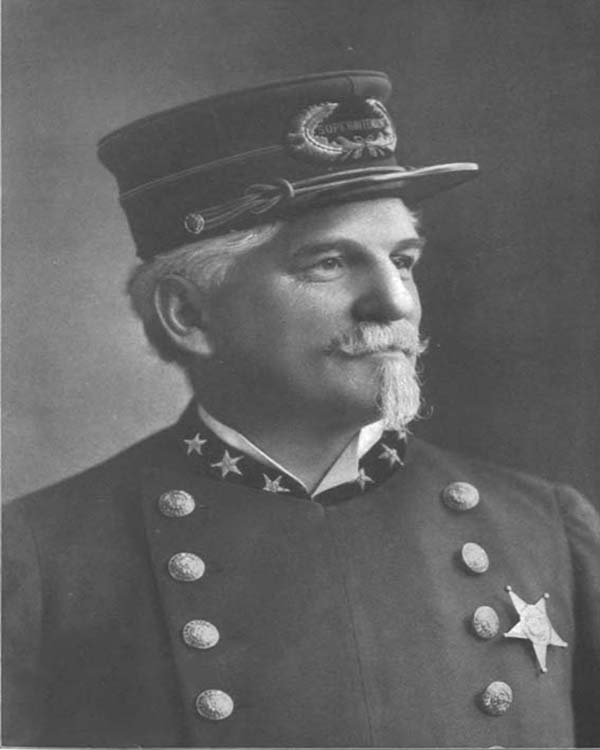
Superintendent Joseph Kipley

Three months after the fire, he joined the Chicago Police Department, and he worked there for many years. He was named Inspector and then an Assistant Superintendent, but when George Bell Swift was elected mayor of Chicago in 1895, Kipley no longer had a position in the department. For the next two years, Kipley organized the Star League, a political group consisting of former Chicago police officers. Kipley was appointed Chief of Police of Chicago by Mayor Carter Harrison IV in 1897.

== Death ==
In early 1904, Kipley began to experience stomach problems. He underwent an operation, but it left him very ill and he died a few days later on 6 February 1904. A death notice in the St. Louis Republic called him "the most widely known Chief of Police Chicago ever had."

== Legacy ==
The Ice Pond Mystery, a detective novel written by Kipley as a police lieutenant, was published posthumously by the J.S. Ogilvie Publishing Company as part of its Shield Series.

The fictional character of Detective Joseph Kipley in Manacle and Bracelet; or, the Dead Man's Secret, A Thrilling Detective Story, by Edmund C. Strong, in which Detective Kipley solves a series of crimes in Chicago, including murder, is based on the real Joseph Kipley.

== Gallery ==
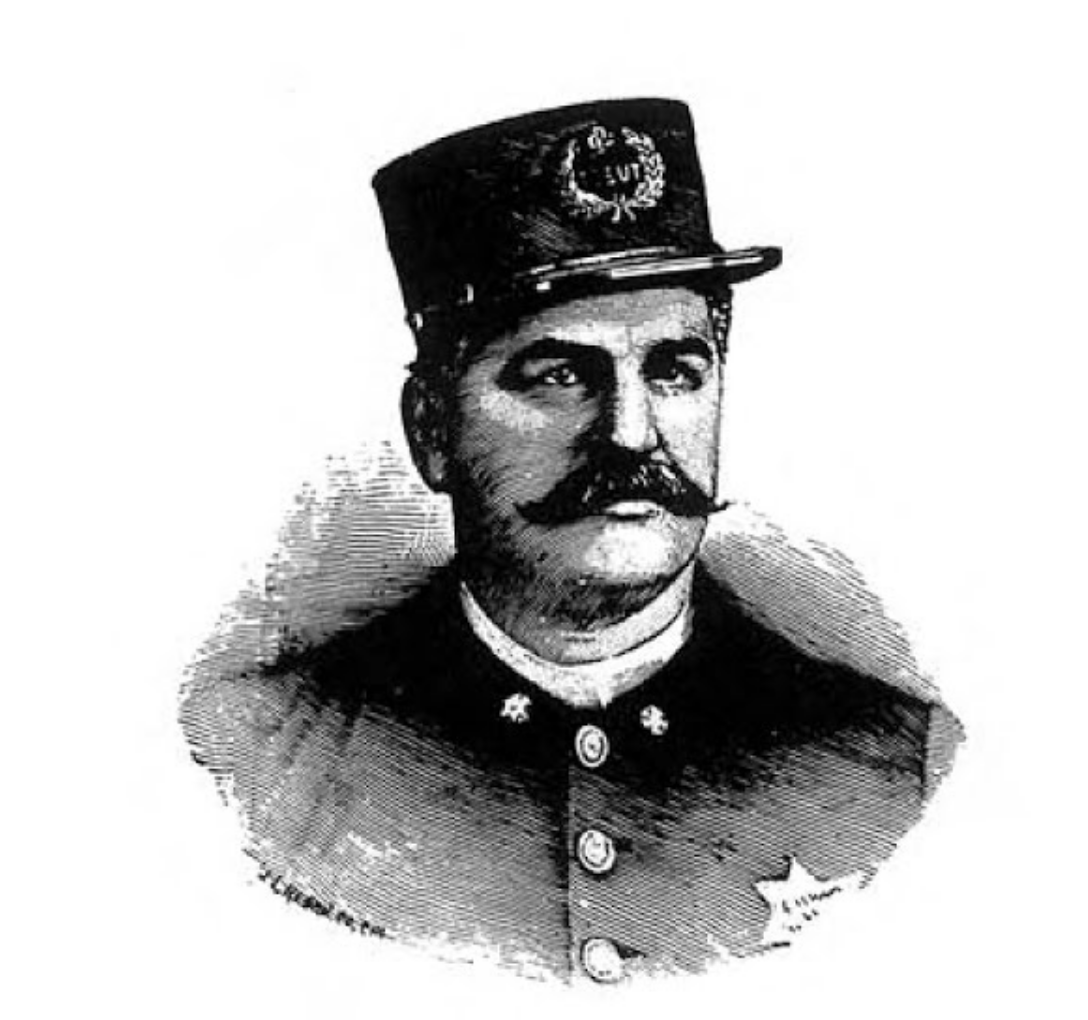
Drawing of Joseph Kipley
