= Cook County Sheriff's Office =

- Patch of the Cook County Sheriff's Office
- Abbreviation: CCSO

Agency overview
- Annual budget: $619 m (2020)

Jurisdictional structure
- Operations jurisdiction: Cook County, Illinois, Illinois, United States
- Legal jurisdiction: Cook County, Illinois
- General nature: Local civilian police

Operational structure
- Headquarters: Chicago & Maywood, Illinois
- Sworn members: 6,900 at full strength
- Sheriff responsible: Thomas J. Dart
- Departments: 4: Cook County Department of Corrections, Court Services Department, The Sheriff’s Police Department; and the Office Of Professional Review

Website
- cookcountysheriffil.gov

The Cook County Sheriff's Office (CCSO) is the principal law enforcement agency that serves Cook County, Illinois. It is the second largest sheriff's office in the United States, with over 6,900 members when at full operational strength. It is headed by the Cook County sheriff, currently Thomas Dart.

Like other sheriffs' offices in Illinois, the sheriff can provide all traditional law-enforcement functions, including county-wide patrol and investigations irrespective of municipal boundaries, even in the city of Chicago, but has traditionally limited its police patrol functions to unincorporated areas of the county because unincorporated areas are the primary jurisdiction of a sheriff's office in Illinois. The sheriff's police patrol services are often not required in incorporated cities because the cities such as Chicago have established their own police departments.

Sheriff's deputies provide the other services of the sheriff, such as service of process, enforcing evictions and levies, securing Circuit Court of Cook County courthouses, securing and operating the 9,000-plus detainee population of the Cook County Jail, transporting prisoners and overseeing offender rehabilitation programs.

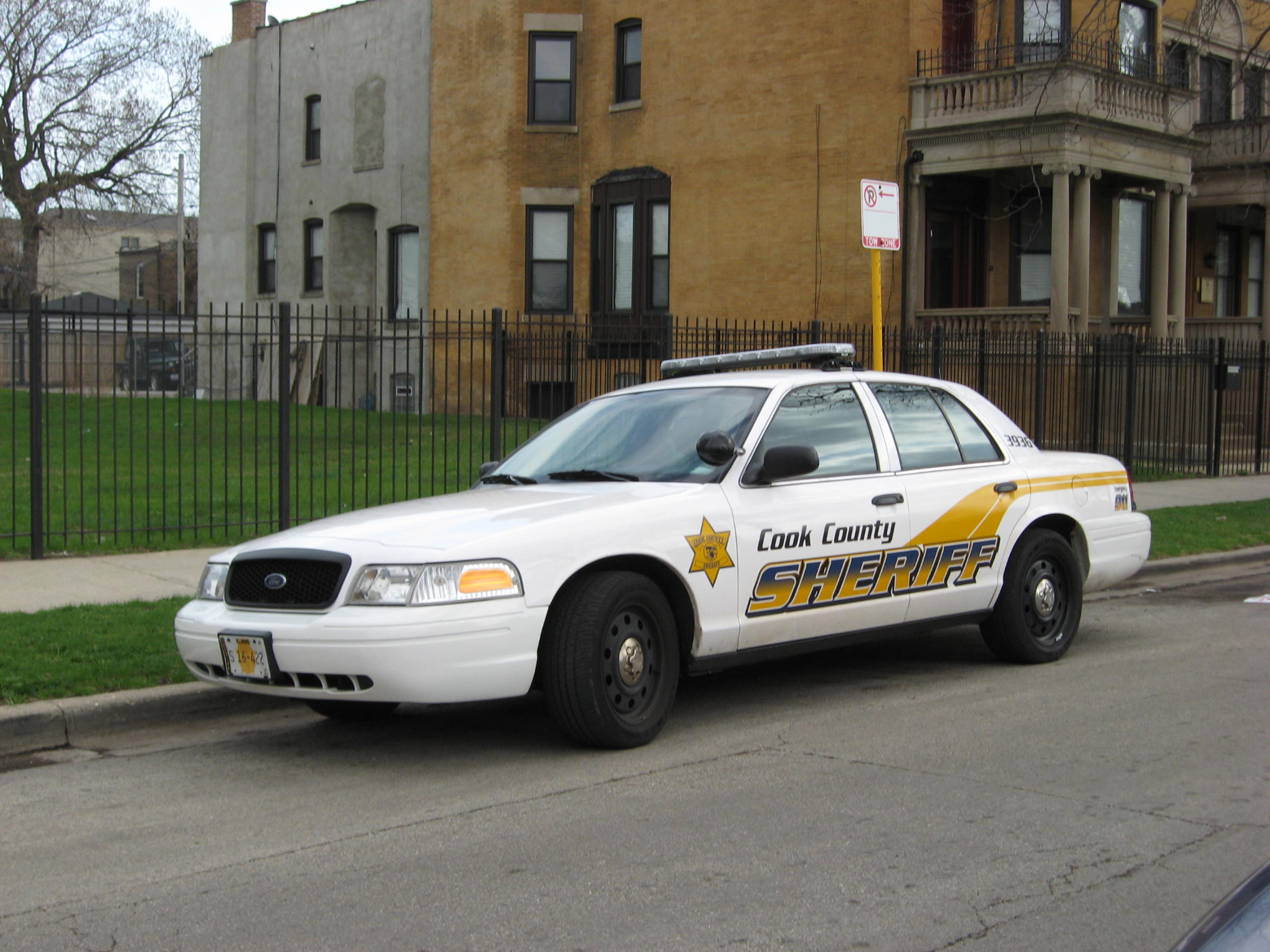
A Ford Crown Victoria Police Interceptor with the Cook County Sheriff's Office (2010)

== Sheriff's Office Internal Departments ==
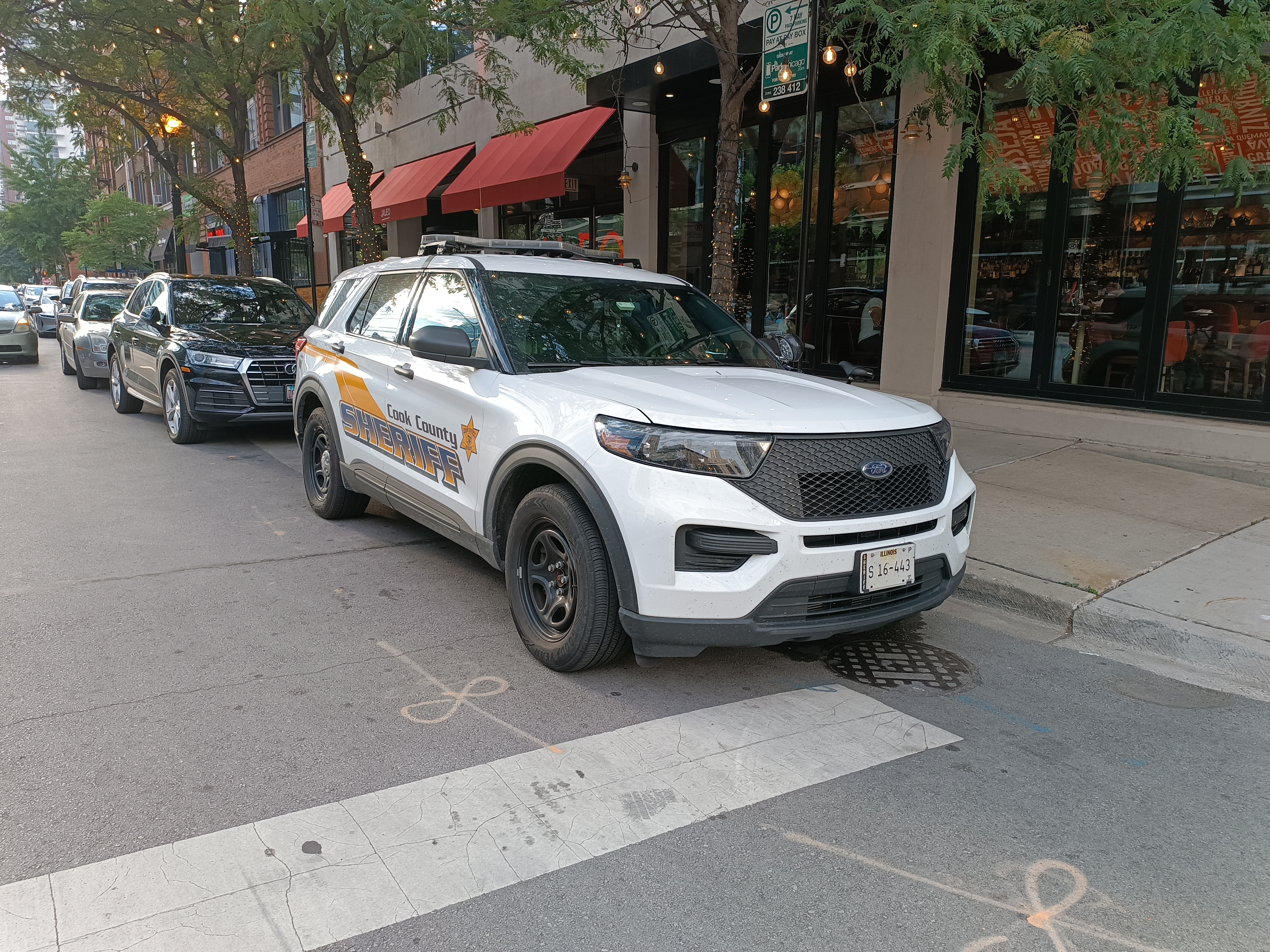
A Ford Police Interceptor Utility with the Cook County Sheriff (2024)

The Cook County Sheriff's Office is carved into several departments.

=== Sheriff's Police ===
The Cook County Sheriff's Police Department has over 500 state certified law enforcement officers charged with patrolling unincorporated areas of Cook County as well as assisting suburban police departments with police operations including, but not limited to, detective and crime scene investigator (CSI) services, narcotics interdiction, bomb detection and disposal, vice operations, street crimes suppression and hostage/barricade/terrorist incidents. Approximately 109,000 people live in unincorporated communities within Cook County among the county's 5.3 million total population. The Cook County Sheriff's Police Training Academy trains police recruits within the department as well as those from suburban agencies.

=== Detention and corrections ===
Cook County Sheriff's Department of Corrections is one of the largest single-site pre-trial holding facilities in the world. Deputy Sheriff's assigned to Department of Corrections are responsible for the security of more than 9,000 detainees, many of whom are violent offenders awaiting trial in the criminal court system.

- Sheriff's Police Fugitive Warrant Unit is responsible for the apprehension of fugitives wanted on warrants for criminal offenses. This unit works closely with the United States Marshal's Great Lakes Task Force and is also responsible for extradition of offenders from outside the Cook County area.
- Sheriff's Office BII / Criminal Intelligence Unit is a vital information hub gathering gang intelligence from within the Department of Corrections and bridges the information gap between all divisions of the sheriff's office and outside agencies. This unit is also responsible for investigative services within corrections and court facilities and is featured in the MSNBC television series "The Squeeze".
- Jail Diversion and Crime Prevention Division was designed to make the Cook County Sheriff's Office more useful and accessible to residents. It operates many vital preventive and educational programs that municipalities, schools and average citizens can take advantage of free of charge. Programs include DUI and distracted driving prevention, graffiti removal, New Path speakers' series, and the SMART program.

=== Internal affairs ===
The Office Of Professional Review investigates allegations of misconduct within the sheriff's office.

=== Court services ===
The Court Services Department provides security for all courtrooms, judges and other government officials as well as prisoners being tried. In addition to providing courtroom security, deputy sheriffs operate security posts at the entrance of each facility where many arrests are made every year of individuals attempting to enter with weapons, drugs and other various contraband. Cook County is home to one of the largest unified court systems in the world, including the Richard J. Daley Center which is arguably the largest courthouse in the world. The Court Services Department also enforces court orders such as evictions.

== See also ==
- Cook County State's Attorney
- Circuit Court of Cook County
- List of law enforcement agencies in Illinois
