= Maclay Hoyne =

American politician and lawyer (1872-1939)

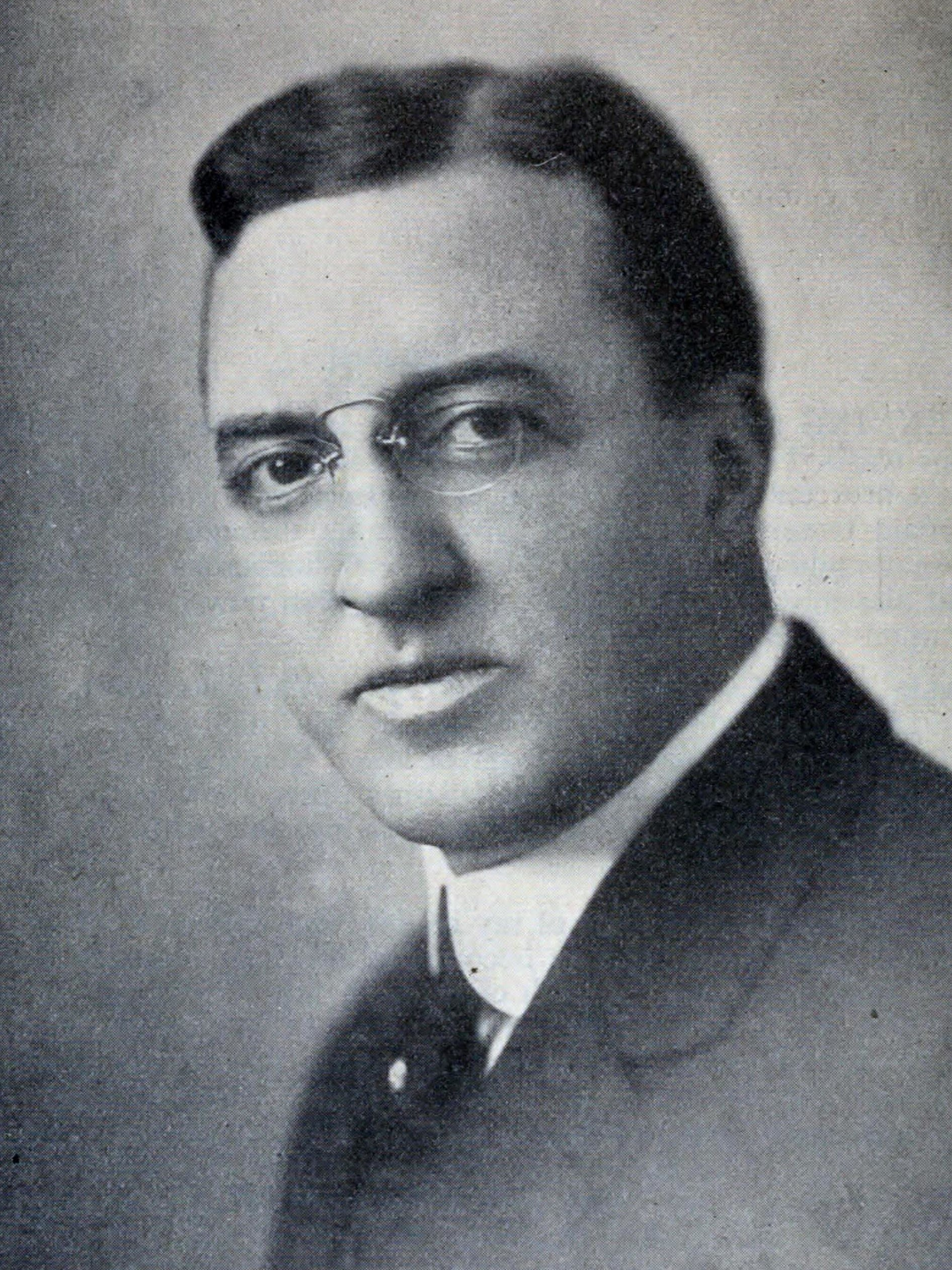
- Hoyne in 1916

Cook County State's Attorney
- In office 1912–1920
- Preceded by: J. E. W. Wayman
- Succeeded by: Robert E. Crowe

Personal details
- Born: October 12, 1872
- Died: October 1, 1939 (aged 66) Chicago, Illinois, US
- Party: Democratic
- Relations: Thomas Hoyne (grandfather)
- Occupation: Lawyer

Thomas Maclay Hoyne II (October 12, 1872 – October 1, 1939) was an American politician and lawyer. As a Democrat, from 1912 through 1920, Hoyne served as Cook County State's Attorney. Hoyne also ran as an independent candidate in the 1919 Chicago mayoral election.

== Early life ==
Hoyne was born October 12, 1872. Hoyne was the grandson of Thomas Hoyne.

== Career ==
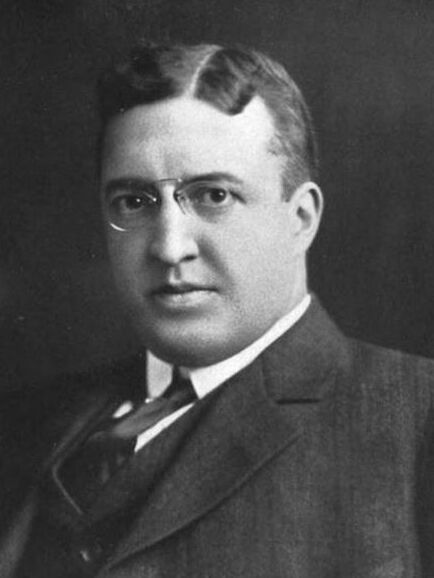
Hoyne circa 1912

A mentee of Chicago mayor Carter Harrison IV, Hoyne was tasked in his early political career with overseeing the city's Sixth Ward Democratic Organization. In 1903, after he was elected to a fourth consecutive term as mayor, Harrison appointed Hoyne as the city's Assistant Corporation Counsel. A few years later, Hoyne made an unsuccessful run for county judge. He was later promoted to the First Assistant Corporation Counsel.

In 1908, Hoyne ran for the Democratic nomination for Cook County State's Attorney, supported by the wing of the Carter Harrison IV-led wing of the city's Democratic Party. He was up against six other candidates, including William Emmett Dever (supported by the Edward Fitzsimmons Dunne-led wing of the party), and J.J. Kern (supported by the Roger Charles Sullivan-led wing of the party). Kern wound up winning the primary.

In 1912, Hoyne ran again, and was elected Cook County State's Attorney. He was reelected to a second term in 1916. During his tenure, his prosecuting staff procured over 5,000 penitentiary convictions. In his later years as prosecutor, his house was fired upon in assassination attempts. Yet, Hoyne ignored warnings about his safety, and refused the protection of bodyguards.

Hoyne unsuccessfully ran as an independent candidate in the 1919 Chicago mayoral election.

In 1920, Hoyne ran for a third-term as Cook County State's Attorney. However, he lost the Democratic primary to Michael L. Igoe, who went on to be defeated in the general election by Republican Robert E. Crowe.

From 1927 until 1929, Hoyne served as counsel for the Sanitary District of Chicago.

== Death ==
Hoyne died October 1, 1939, in Chicago.

== Electoral history ==
1912 Cook County State’s Attorney election
Party	Candidate	Votes	%
Democratic	Mackay Hoyne	122,419	27.85
Republican	Lewis Rinaker	113,181	25.74
Socialist	William A. Cunnea	107,647	24.49
Progressive	George I. Haight	93,495	21.27
Prohibition	John H. Hill	2,896	0.66
Total votes		439,638	100.00

1916 Cook County State’s Attorney Democratic primary
Party	Candidate	Votes	%
Democratic	Maclay Hoyne (incumbent)	90,759	86.24
Democratic	Charles E. Erbstein	14,483	13.76
Total votes		105,242	100.00

1916 Cook County State’s Attorney election
Party	Candidate	Votes	%
Democratic	Maclay Hoyne (incumbent)	236,384	44.57
Republican	Harry B. Miller	191,456	36.10
Socialist	William A. Cunnea	102,579	19.34
Total votes		530,419	100.00

1919 Chicago mayoral election
Party	Candidate	Votes	%
Republican	William H. Thompson (incumbent)	259,828	37.61
Democratic	Robert Sweitzer	238,206	34.48
Independent	Maclay Hoyne	110,851	16.05
Cook County Labor Party	John Fitzpatrick	55,990	8.11
Socialist	John Collins	24,079	3.49
Socialist Labor	Adolph S. Carm	1,848	0.27
Total votes		690,802	100.00

1920 Cook County State’s Attorney Democratic primary
Party	Candidate	Votes	%
Democratic	Michael L. Igoe	59,658	54.68
Democratic	Maclay Hoyne (incumbent)	43.71	44.57
Democratic	John K. Murphy	1,750	1.60
Total votes		109,097	100.00
