= Robert Ogden =

Robert Ogden may refer to:

- Robert Ogden (New Jersey politician) (1716–1765), speaker of the New Jersey assembly and delegate to the Stamp Act Congress
- Robert Curtis Ogden (1836–1913), American businessman
- Robert N. Ogden Jr. (1839–1905), American lawyer, soldier, and politician
- Robert Morris Ogden (1877–1959), American psychologist and academic
- Robert Ogden (footballer) (1897-1966), English footballer, see List of Bury F.C. players (1–24 appearances)
