= 1915 Chicago mayoral election =

- April 6, 1915
- Turnout: 89% ▲2 pp
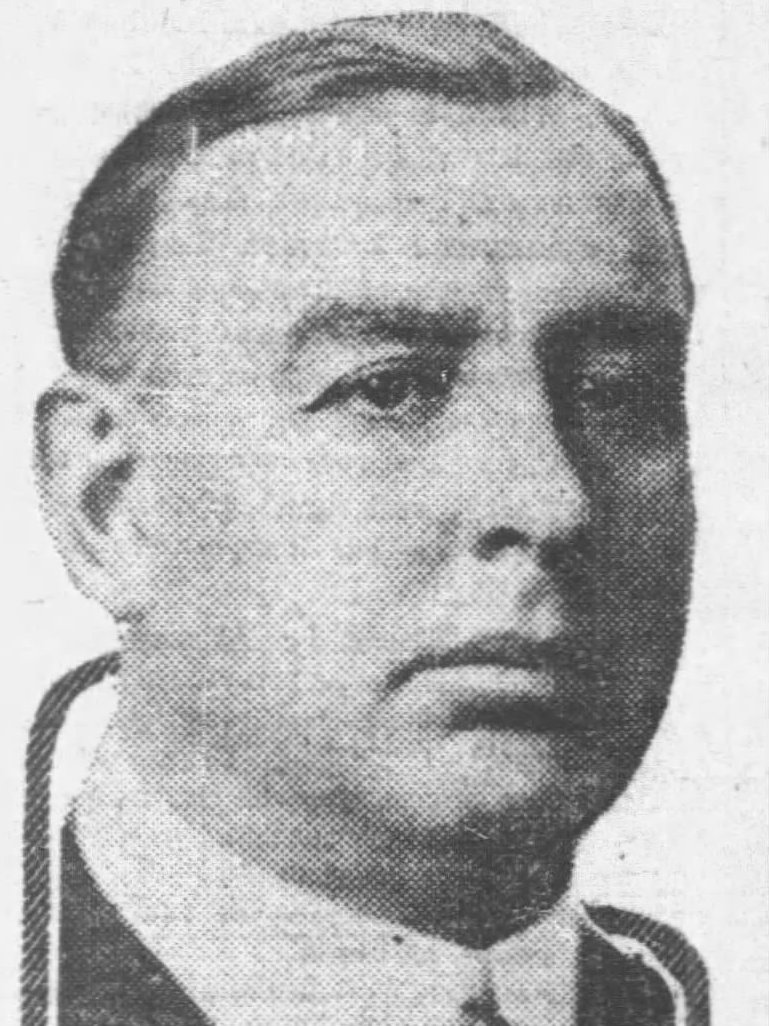

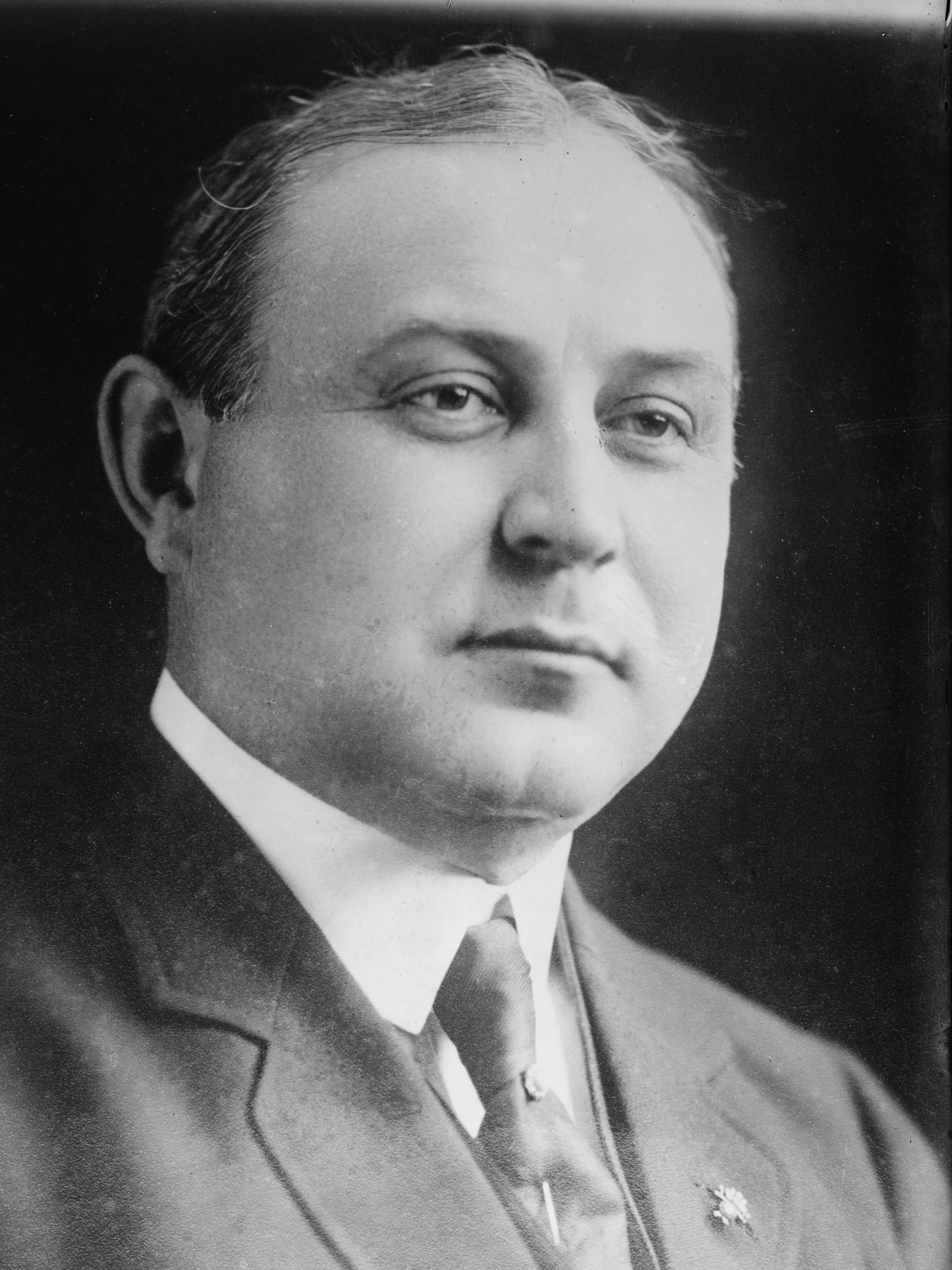
Nominee	William Hale Thompson	Robert Sweitzer
Party	Republican	Democratic
Popular vote	398,538	251,061
Percentage	58.78%	37.03%
Mayor before election
Carter Harrison IV
Democratic
Elected mayor
William Hale Thompson
Republican

In the Chicago mayoral election of 1915, Republican William Hale Thompson defeated Democrat Robert Sweitzer.

Fifth-term incumbent Democrat Carter Harrison IV was defeated in the Democratic primary by Cook County Clerk Sweitzer. In the Republican primary, Thompson defeated Harry Olson by a 1.33% margin. Thompson was a former Cook County commissioner and former Chicago alderman, while Olson was the incumbent chief justice of the Municipal Court of Chicago.

This was the first mayoral election to take place in Chicago after Illinois granted partial women's suffrage, enabling women to vote in Chicago mayoral elections among other elections. The election was held on April 6.

== Nominations ==
=== Democratic primary ===
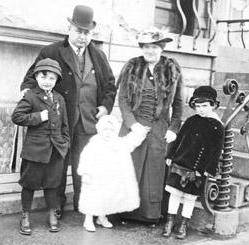
Sweitzer poses outside of his house with his family on the day of the primary

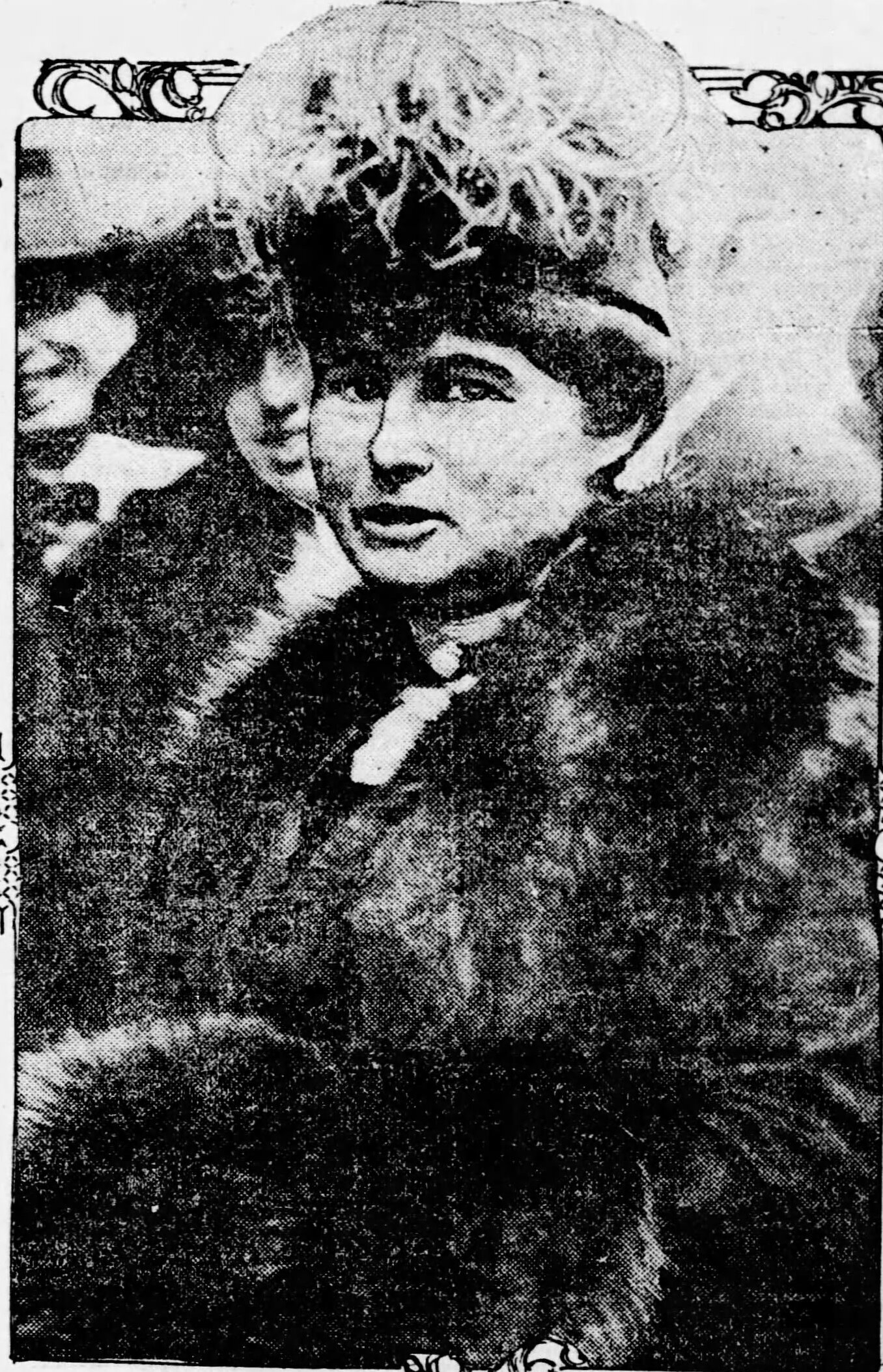
Harrison's wife, Edith Ogden Harrison, campaigning in support of his candidacy ahead of the primary election

Cook County Clerk Robert Sweitzer challenged incumbent mayor Carter Harrison IV in the Democratic primary.

Harrison's preceding fifth term had been hampered by an inner-party power struggle between Harrison and Democratic boss Roger Sullivan. Sweitzer was considered to be a Sullivan loyalist.

There had been calls for Sullivan himself to seek the mayoralty, but he declined. After the a successful 1912 election cycle for Democrats, a significant number of people had been willing to run for mayor as candidates for Sullivan's faction of the party. This included Chicago City Clerk Francis D. Connery, Cook County Circuit Court Clerk John W. Rainey, and Robert M. Sweitzer. Sweitzer prevailed to become Sullivan's candidate.

During the primary, Sullivan kept himself away from the spotlight, working behind the scenes in support of Sweitzer. He did this to avoid having Sweitzer's affiliation with him used for campaign attacks the way his connection with his hand-picked 1911 Democratic primary candidate, Andrew J. Graham, had been used a line of attack. He still headed Sweitzer's campaign committee, which also featured prominent Chicago politicians such as Robert "Bobby" Burke, Patrick Nash, Frank Ryan, Cook County Treasurer Henry Stuckart, and Chicago City Clerk Francis D. Connery.

Sweitzer's campaign's main therme was "efficiency in government". His campaign focused on Sweitzer's competent record and Harrison's shortcomings. He accused Harrison of running the city into debt, being a feeble administrator, and being responsible for the persistence of poor service on the city's street cars.

Harrison was accused of being disloyal to the party for not having supported Sullivan's 1914 United States Senate campaign.

Sweitzer was able to build a coalition of ethnic groups that were put off by Harrison's war on crime. Sweitzer, being German (a group that made up 30% of the city's population), earned support from Germans. Harrison was portrayed by Sweitzer's campaign as of being anti-Irish and anti-Catholic. He was also painted as an "aristocrat", which was charge that was off-putting to the city's many recent European immigrants, who poorly regarded aristocracy.

Harrison ran a poor campaign. His campaign manager was John J. Sloan.

During the campaign, Harrison angrily fought back at negative allegations made against him.

Harrison sought to receive the support of every political ally possible. He succeeded in securing the backing of Anton Cermak, Adolph J. Sabath, Sheriff John Traeger, Chicago City Comptroller Michael Zimmer, City Treasurer of Chicago Michael Danisch. He also received a number of state legislators to back him, such as Michael Igoe. He even received a few endorsements from a few defactors from Sillivan's faction of the part, including former alderman Thomas Little as well as Thomas F. Flynn (who had been the campaign manager of Sullivan's 1911 mayoral candidate Andrew J. Graham). Harrison additionally managed to secure a tepid endorsement from Governor Edward Fitzsimmons Dunne. In his endorsement of Harrison, Dunne stated that, despite his history of disagreements with Harrison, he felt that "by training, education, experience, and ability", Harrison was a better candidate.

As he had in 1911, Harrison sought to make Sullivan's support a campaign issue for his opponent, portraying Sullivan as a villain. However, in 1915 this was less effective than it had been four years prior, with the Democratic Party having only months before had Sullivan as its standard-bearer in the state's U.S. senate election.

Harrison sought to weaken Sweitzer's appeal to German-American voters by challenging Sweitzer to deliver a speech in German, despite the fact that Sweitzer was not bilingual. Harrison boasted of his own ability to speak German (he had received his education in Germany). Harrison also sought to link Sweitzer to criminal leaders. This had little impact, as Harrison had his own history of ties to men or poor regard for the law.

Harrison used the power of his office to his advantage. He ordered police to stop the mass posting of election posters, a favorite campaign tactic of Sullivan's faction. He cracked down on legal misdeeds of loyalists that had defected from him. He also attempted to convince county judge Thomas F. Scully to order every voter in the primary to be challenged. Scully, a Sullivan ally, voiced disdain for this request and alleged that it would amount to voter suppression.

Late into the campaign, Harrison became sick. His wife Edith Ogden Harrison acted as an effective surrogate for him at rallies and meetings.

During the campaign, each candidate sought to take advantage of the new advent of women's suffrage in Illinois. Harrison established special female committees tasked with canvassing the city's female electorate. Sweitzer had a women's auxiliary of his campaign, which argued that he was the stronger advocate for women's right. A key female endorser of Harrison was Margaret Haley, while a key female endorser of Sweitzer was Joanne E. Downes (president of the Illinois Women's Democratic League). However, many prominent progressive women disregarded both Democratic candidates, and instead endorsed Republican primary candidate Harry Olson.

Each candidate also sought to appeal to voters that opposed the prohibition of alcohol. Harrison managed to secure the backing of the United Societies for Local Self-Government, the top pro-alcohol lobbying group.

The primary also featured instances of violence.

As the election came near to its end, each side touted its prospects of winning. There appeared reason to believe the race might be close, but this did not prove to be the case.

==== Endorsements ====
Carter Harrison IV

Officeholders

- Anton Cermak, Chicago alderman and former member of the Illinois House of Representatives
- Michael Danisch, City Treasurer of Chicago
- Edward Fitzsimmons Dunne, Illinois governor and former mayor of Chicago
- Thomas Little, Chicago alderman
- Adolph J. Sabath, congressman
- John E. Traeger, Cook County Sheriff
- Michael Zimmer, Chicago City Comptroller
- Michael Igoe, state legislator

Individuals

- Thomas F. Flynn, campaign manager of Andrew J. Graham's 1911 Chicago mayoral campaign
- Margaret Haley, activist

Organizations

- United Societies for Self-Government
Robert Sweitzer

Individuals

- Roger Charles Sullivan, Chairman of the Cook County Democratic Party and Democratic 1914 United States Senate nominee
- Joanne E. Downes, president of the Illinois Women's Democratic League

==== Results ====
Sweitzer handily won, defeating Harrison by a broad margin.

Sweitzer's victory effectively cost Harrison the opportunity to further pursue a, then-unprecedented, sixth term as mayor. It would not be until 1975 that a mayor (Richard J. Daley) would win election to a sixth term.

Sweitzer carried 32 wards, while Harrison carried three.

After bitterly conceding, Harrison refused to rule-out the possibility of a third-party campaign.

Democratic primary (February 23, 1915)
Party	Candidate	Votes	%
Democratic	Robert Sweitzer	182,534	63.02
Democratic	Carter Harrison IV (incumbent)	104,983	36.24
Democratic	Frank J. Wilson	1,343	0.46
Democratic	John J. Geraghty	318	0.11
Democratic	Thomas O'Dwyer	205	0.07
Democratic	Peter J. O'Reilly	112	0.04
Democratic	James Traynor	88	0.03
Democratic	R. P. Butler	84	0.03
Turnout		289,667	

=== Republican primary ===
At the time of the primary, the Illinois Republican Party had been divided into two groups, one led by former governor Charles S. Deneen and another which was jointly led by William Lorimer and Frederick Lundin. Illinois' Republican Party had been thrown into chaos along with the national party in the aftermath of the 1912 United States presidential election, in which former president Theodore Roosevelt ran as a third-party candidate and split the Republican vote. The power balance in Illinois' Republican Party had also been altered by Lorimer's removal from the United States Senate and Deneen's 1913 loss in his bid to seek reelection as governor.

William Hale Thompson and Lundin had formed a political alliance, along with George F. Harding (political boss of the second ward), and James A. Pugh. Lundin orchestrated a "draft" effort in December 1914 to demonstrate popular support for Thompson's candidacy. He managed to get 15,000 individuals to sign a petition urging Thompson to run in the Republican mayoral primary, which was presented to him at a grand ceremony Lundin orchestrated at the Auditorium Theatre on December 22, 1914, where Thompson publicly declared he would run. In actuality, Lundin and Thompson had actually been planning for his mayoral run since 1912.

Thompson's chief opponent for the nomination was Harry Olson, Chief Justice of the Municipal Court of Chicago. Olson was backed by Charles S. Deneen. Olson was widely considered the most progressive candidate running for either party's nomination. Olson received endorsements from many prominent progressive women, such as Jane Addams.

Thompson was also challenged by Alderman Jacob A. Hey.

Despite his support from Lorimer and Lundin, Thompson was seen as backing the support of an established political machine. Lorimer was perceived to have had his prestige and influence decline following his 1912 ousting from the United States Senate.

Thompson benefited from his political alliance, as George F. Harding managed to secure Thompson strong support in the second ward, which proved to be critical in securing him his narrow margin of victory.

Thompson worked hard to seek strong support from the African American community. He also courted the city's German population, giving strong praise to Germans and their culture, and dismissing reports of atrocities being committed by the German forces in the German occupation of Belgium as British propaganda. This would prelude the neutral stance on World War I and the evocation of anglophobia that would become notable characteristics of Thompson's political career.

==== Endorsements ====
Harry Olson

Officeholders

- Charles S. Deneen, ex-governor
- Charles Edward Merriam, alderman and 1911 Republican mayoral nominee

Individuals

- Jane Addams, activist
Bill Thompson

Officeholders

- Frederick Lundin
- William Lorimer, former Senator

Individuals

- George F. Harding
- James A. Pugh

==== Results ====
Thompson won the Republican primary on February 23 by a narrow margin. The Republican primary received less attention from both the public and the media than the Democratic primary.

Republican primary (February 23, 1915)
Party	Candidate	Votes	%
Republican	William H. Thompson	87,060	49.47
Republican	Harry Olson	84,735	48.14
Republican	Jacob A. Hey	4,207	2.39
Turnout		176,002	

=== Progressive nomination ===
The Progressive Party nominated Charles M. Thomson. Thompson ultimately withdrew from the race and backed Republican nominee William H. Thompson. William Hale Thompson, in turn would later endorse Charles M. Thomson's subsequent successful campaign for the Circuit Court of Cook County later that year.

=== Prohibition nomination ===
John H. Hill received the Prohibition Party nomination.

=== Socialist nomination ===
Seymour Stedman received the Socialist Party nomination.

Steadman had originally been planning to instead run for City Treasurer.

== General election ==
=== Campaigning ===
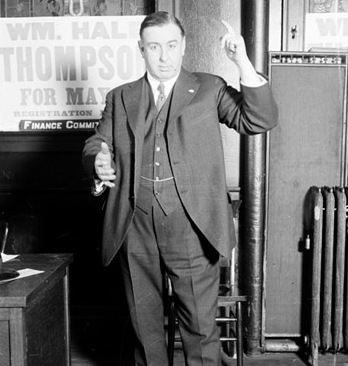
Thompson during his campaign

Initially, many thought Sweitzer to have the advantage in the race, as 50% more people had voted in the Democratic primary than the Republican primary. Many newspapers in the city discounted Thompson's prospects.

After the primaries, both candidates faced the immediate challenges of unifying their parties after contentious primaries.

A major blow to Sweitzer's campaign occurred when, bitter over his loss in the primary, Carter Harrison IV endorsed Thompson. Harrison's endorsement bolstered Thompson's support from business elites, a group which was already inclined to support him over Sweitzer.

In contrast to the disunity of the Democratic Party, the Republican Party's Lundin wing brokered a peace with its Deneen wing. Thompson had quickly, after his primary win, garnered the endorsements of Deneen and his Deneen-backed primary opponent Harry Olson.

Thompson campaigned energetically. He managed to draw large to his rallies, employing techniques such as putting on parades and circuses to lure spectators to his political events.

Thompson saw strong support from such groups as Germans, Swedes, and blacks.

Democrats played up the fact that Sweitzer was of Irish and German descent in hopes that it might drum-up enthusiasm amongst voters in Chicago's immigrant community. They particularly targeted German-Americans and Catholics. Republicans charged that the Democratic Party had been attempting to mislead voters into thinking that Sweitzer was catholic, in an alleged effort to pander to voters in a city with a nearly 50% catholic population. Whether or not these charges were true, many Protestant ministers were persuaded by these allegations to publicly support Thompson over Sweitzer.

Democrats also aimed to cast Sweitzer as a capable individual with a strong business record.

Sweitzer was a "wet", meaning that he was against prohibition, which many around the country had been advocating for at the time. Prohibitionists were skeptical of Thompson, who had ties to Lorimer (a "wet").

Both the Chicago Daily News and the Chicago Tribune opposed, while the Chicago Journal strongly supported Thompson. In response to the opposition he received from newspapers, Thompson demonized what he dubbed the "trust press". He made an issue of the low property taxes Daily News publisher Victor Lawson reportedly paid on his Lake Shore Drive mansion. Thompson alleged that, in his tenure as Cook County Clerk Sweitzer had been responsible for this and other alleged calculation errors regarding taxes.

The election was also shaped the backdrop of the World War in Europe. Democrats had become concerned that German voters regarded Sweitzer as having "abandoned his heritage" (in the past he had emphasized his Irish heritage far more than his German heritage). They undertook misguided efforts to drum up German support for his candidacy, which ultimately proved to be at the peril of his overall appeal to non-German/Austrian voters. Materials supporting Sweitzer had been distributed in the German and Austrian neighborhoods of Chicago baring images of Kaiser Wilhelm and Emperor Franz Joseph were distributed urging all citizens of central European origin to support Sweitzer and the "Fatherland". This became significant when Sweitzer did not disavow these materials, thus lending credence to an informal association of him with the Central Powers war effort. Thompson's campaign seized on this, and distributed identical materials to Chicago's Polish and Czechoslovak neighborhoods.

An attempt to draft Charles E. Merriam as a third-party candidate failed, to Thompson's relief. Additionally, Progressive Party nominee, Charles M. Thompson, withdrew from the race and backed the Republican Thompson.

While Sweitzer was officially endorsed by the Teamsters, the trade union support he received was dampened by a rumor that he had been a strikebreaker during a 1905 Teamsters strike. Despite Harrison's refusal to back him, many members of Harrison's faction of the Democratic Party did back him, such as Adolph Sabath, former county judge John E. Owens, and John J. Sloan.

Sweitzer was also burdened by organizational weakness of the Democratic Party. At the time of the election the Democratic Party lacked a strong political machine in Chicago.

Thompson accused Sweitzer of being the favored candidate of the city's criminal leadership.

Thompson sought to resurrect the, decades old, Ogden Gas Scandal, advertising the fact that Roger Sullivan had now made a significant profit from the company's 1913 sale to the city's local utility monopoly. Democrats countered this by revealing that Thompson had received a $5,000 contribution from James A. Patterson, the Maning director of the People's Gas and Electric Company.

The Democrats sought to associate Thompson with Lorimer.

Anti-Catholic literature appeared in Protestant neighborhoods, which echoed similar literature that had appeared during the 1912 senate election. Amid this, the Democrats and Republicans blamed each other for having been the party responsible for the literature.

Democratic prospects may also have been hampered by the economic downturn being experienced, which was attributable to the conflict in Europe.

There were examples of election violence during the campaign, most notably with street battles which erupted on April 3, three days before the election. However, Election Day itself was largely devoid of election violence.

Besides Thompson and Sweitzer, the two additional candidates running in the election were Socialist candidate Seymour Steadman and Prohibition Party candidate John H. Hill.

While Thompson had secured a lead in the campaign, with betting odds reflecting this, people failed to forecast a landslide victory.

=== Endorsements ===
Robert Sweitzer (Democratic)

Officeholders

- Edward Fitzsimmons Dunne, Illinois Governor and former mayor of Chicago
- John E. Owens, former county judge
- Adolph Sabath, congressman

Individuals

- Roger Charles Sullivan, Chairman of the Cook County Democratic Party and Democratic 1914 United States Senate nominee
- John J. Sloan, Carter Harrison IV's primary election campaign manager

Organizations

- Teamsters

Newspapers

- Chicago Daily News
- Chicago Tribune
Bill Thompson (Republican)

Officeholders

- Charles Deneen, former governor
- Frederick Lundin former congressman
- William Lorimer, former Senator
- Harry Olson, Chief Justice of the Municipal Court

Individuals

- George F. Harding
- James A. Pugh

Newspapers

- Chicago Journal

=== Outcome ===
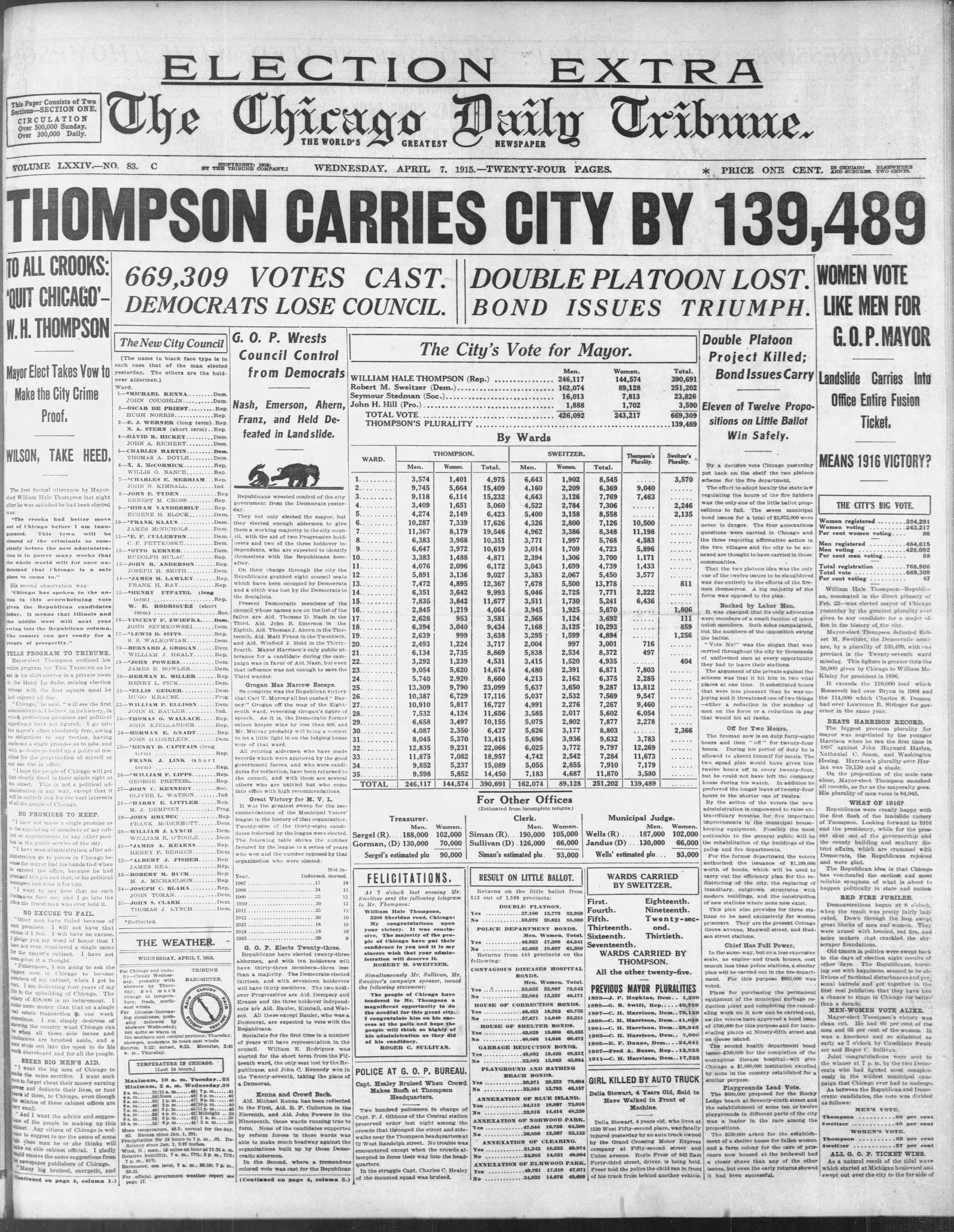
Chicago Daily Tribune "Election Extra", covering the election results (April 7, 1915)

Thompson defeated Sweitzer by greater than an 11% margin. In terms of the number of votes, Thompson's margin of victory was greater than any prior Chicago municipal election. The number of votes Thompson received was more than any other candidate for mayor of Chicago had received, up to that time. Thompson won 25 of the city's 35 wards. Thompson's victory had coattail effect on coinciding municipal races.

The 1915 Chicago municipal elections saw more voters than any municipal election up to that point in United States history. More than 240,000 women voted.

In a poll of professors at the University of Chicago conducted by the Chicago Tribune, Thompson had received overwhelming support, with 81 professors surveyed having voted for Thompson and only 17 having voted for Sweitzer.

Following the election, conversations arose attempting to identify a reason for the failure of Sweitzer's campaign. The Literary Digest proposed that the women's vote was the culprit for Thompson's victory. However, this was an insufficient thesis. While Thompson received 63% of the women's vote, he also had received 60% of the men's vote. Harrison argued that the critical mistake that Democrats had made was bringing religion into the election and the allowing the circulation of materials containing the likeness of Kaiser Wilhelm and Franz Joseph. Analysis, however, has shown that Harrison's own endorsement of Thompson was likely a decisive factor in determining the outcome of the election.

=== Results ===
1915 Chicago mayoral election (general election)
Party	Candidate	Votes	%
Republican	William H. Thompson	398,538	58.78
Democratic	Robert Sweitzer	251,061	37.03
Socialist	Seymour Stedman	24,452	3.61
Prohibition	John H. Hill	3,974	0.59
Turnout		678,025	89

Thompson's 147,477 margin of victory set a then-numeric record for Chicago mayoral elections.

Polling showed that Thompson received 45.90% of the Polish-American vote, while Sweitzer received 51.53% and Stedman received 2.53%.
