= Robert Sweitzer =

American politician

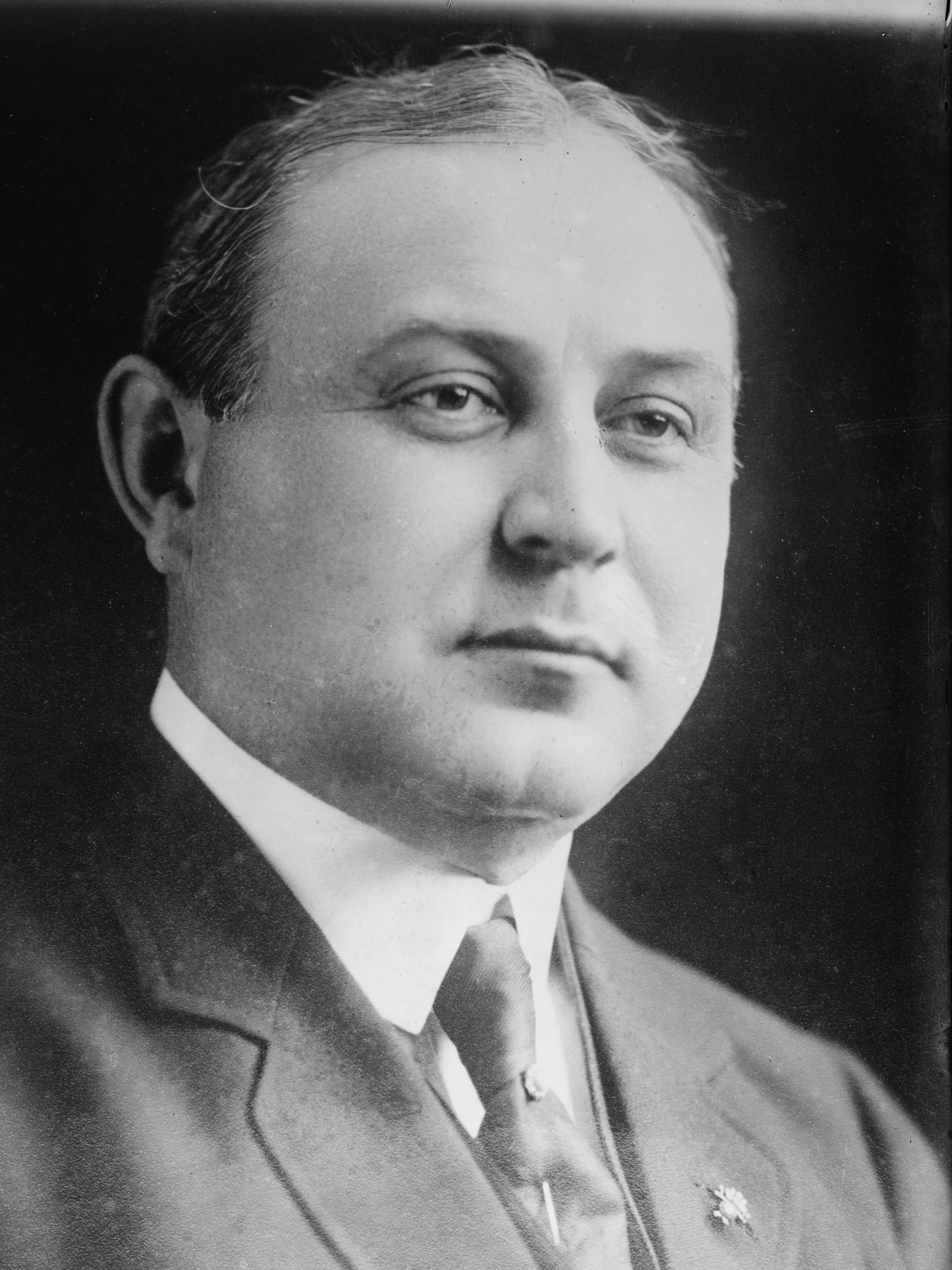
- Sweitzer in 1915

Cook County Treasurer
- In office 1934–1935
- Preceded by: Joseph B. McDonough
- Succeeded by: Joseph L. Gill

17th Cook County Clerk
- In office 1910–1934
- Preceded by: Joseph F. Haas
- Succeeded by: Michael J. Flynn

Personal details
- Born: May 10, 1868 Chicago, Illinois
- Died: April 6, 1938 (aged 69) Chicago, Illinois
- Party: Democratic

Robert M. Sweitzer (May 10, 1868 – April 6, 1938) was an American politician. A Democrat, Sweitzer served as Cook County Clerk for 24 years, and briefly served as Cook County Treasurer until his removal from office due to allegations of financial impropriety. Sweitzer was his party's nominee for Mayor of Chicago in 1915 and 1919, losing both consecutive elections to Republican William Hale Thompson.

== Early life and education ==
Sweitzer was born May 10, 1868, in Chicago.

His father was Martin Johann Sweitzer and his mother was Sarah Lamping Sweitzer (née Lampert). His father, with his parents, emigrated from Germany to Chicago in 1855. His mother was the daughter of a building carpenter from Joliet, Illinois. His parents were married in 1867.

He attended St. Patrick's Academy. He received a Master of Arts from Christian Brothers College in St. Louis.

== Career ==
After completing his education in 1884, he became a tea and dry goods salesman. He continued this career until becoming interested in politics in 1910.

=== Cook County Clerk ===
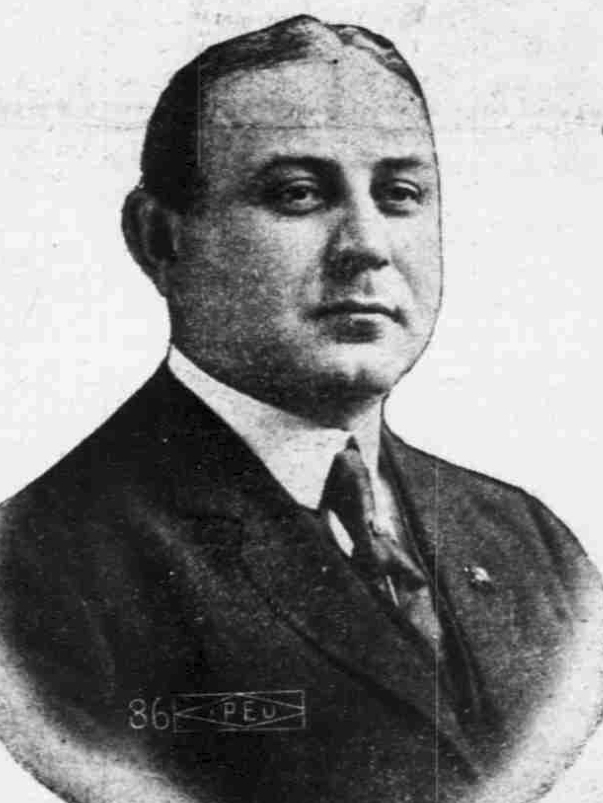
Sweitzer, circa 1919

In 1910, Sweitzer was elected Cook County Clerk. His election is largely credited to the support he received from Democratic boss Roger Charles Sullivan. Sweitzer would hold this position for the next 24 years.

Sweitzer (left) at the 1916 Democratic National Convention, alongside Thomas Taggart (center) and Roger Charles Sullivan (right)

While serving as Cook County Clerk, Sweitzer was his party's nominee for Mayor of Chicago in 1915 and 1919, losing both consecutive elections to Republican William Hale Thompson. In 1915, Sweitzer had won the Democratic nomination after successfully challenging incumbent mayor Carter Harrison IV, who was serving in his fifth non-consecutive term as mayor. Sweitzer was a loyalist to Sullivan, who Harrison had been in a power struggle with throughout his fifth term as mayor. In the Democratic primary, Sweitzer was able to build a coalition of ethnic groups that were put off by Harrison's war on crime. Sweitzer also benefited from Harrison running a poor campaign. Sweitzer defeated Harrison by a broad margin in the primary, but lost the general election to Thompson also by a broad margin. In 1919, Sweitzer, with Sullivan's backing, easily won the Democratic nomination, his only significant opponent being Tom Carey, former chair of the county committee. He would lose the 1919 general election to Thompson by a close margin, with the election seeing four significant candidates (the other two being Maclay Hoyne and John Fitzpatrick).

=== Cook County Treasurer ===
In 1934, he was elected Cook County Treasurer. He assumed office on December 4, 1934.

In Spring of 1935, Michael J. Flynn, his successor as Cook County Clerk, reported apparent discrepancies in the accounts of the office. An audit and subsequent disclosures revealed a deficit of $414,129 in the real estate tax redemption fund. Shortly after this, the Cook County Board held a unanimous vote to remove Sweitzer from office and replace him with Joseph L. Gill, the Clerk of the Municipal Court.

A grand jury indicted Sweitzer on charges of withholding $414,129 in public funds from his successor. However, he was acquitted after six hours of deliberation by the jury. Sweitzer subsequently unsuccessfully attempted to get the courts to rule his removal from office as unconstitutional.

After his acquittal, Sweitzer proclaimed that he would run for County Treasurer again, but he never did.

== Death ==
After a year of ailing health, Sweitzer died on April 6, 1938, at St. Anne's Hospital in Chicago.
