= 1919 Chicago mayoral election =

- Turnout: 89%
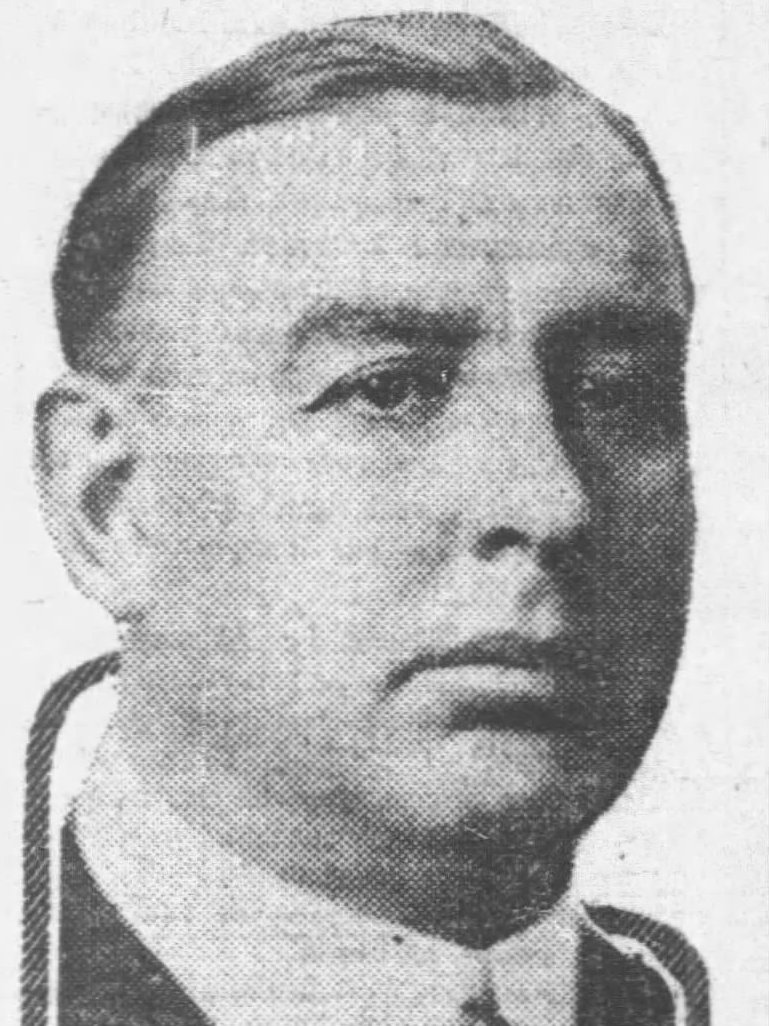

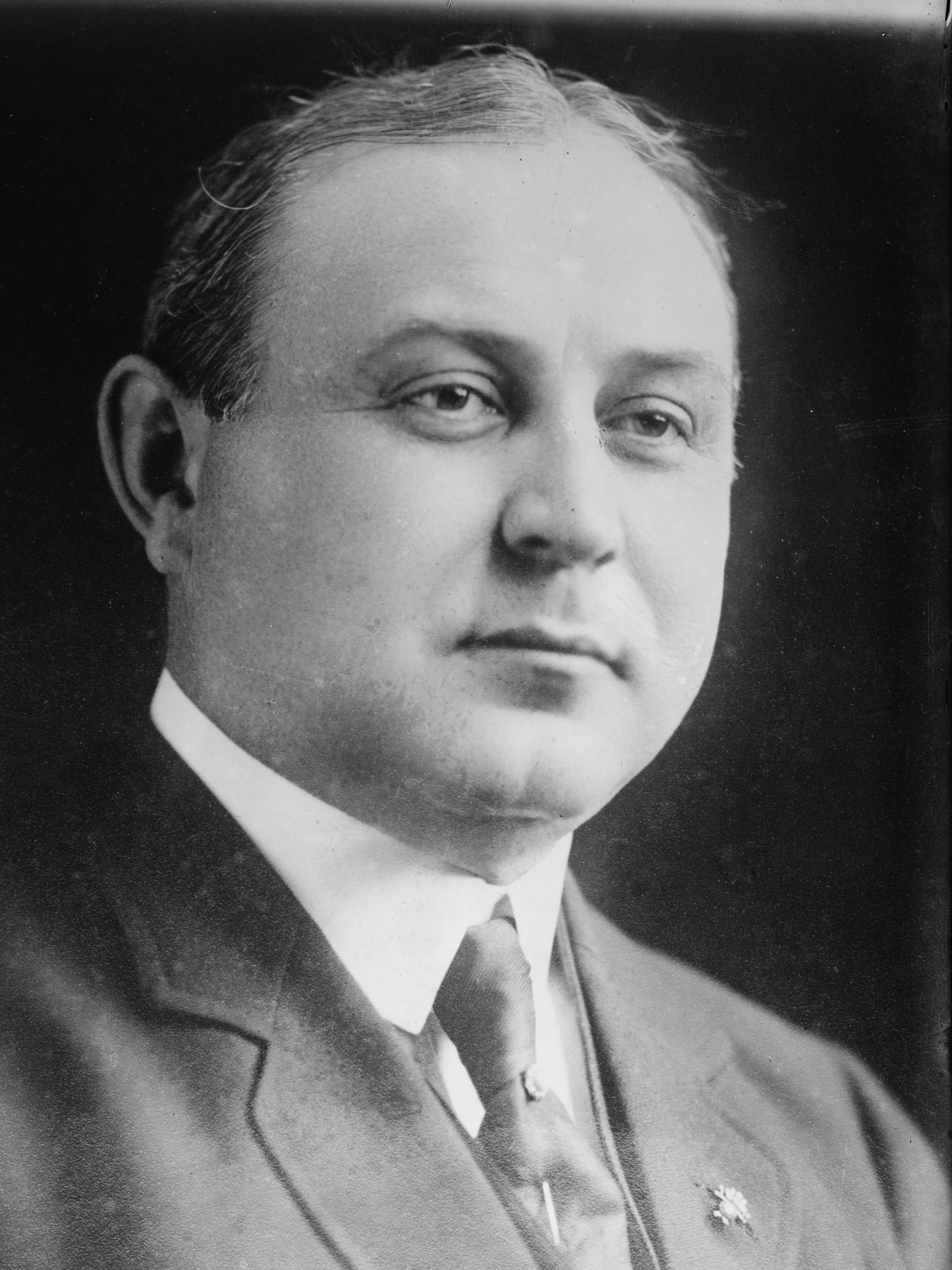

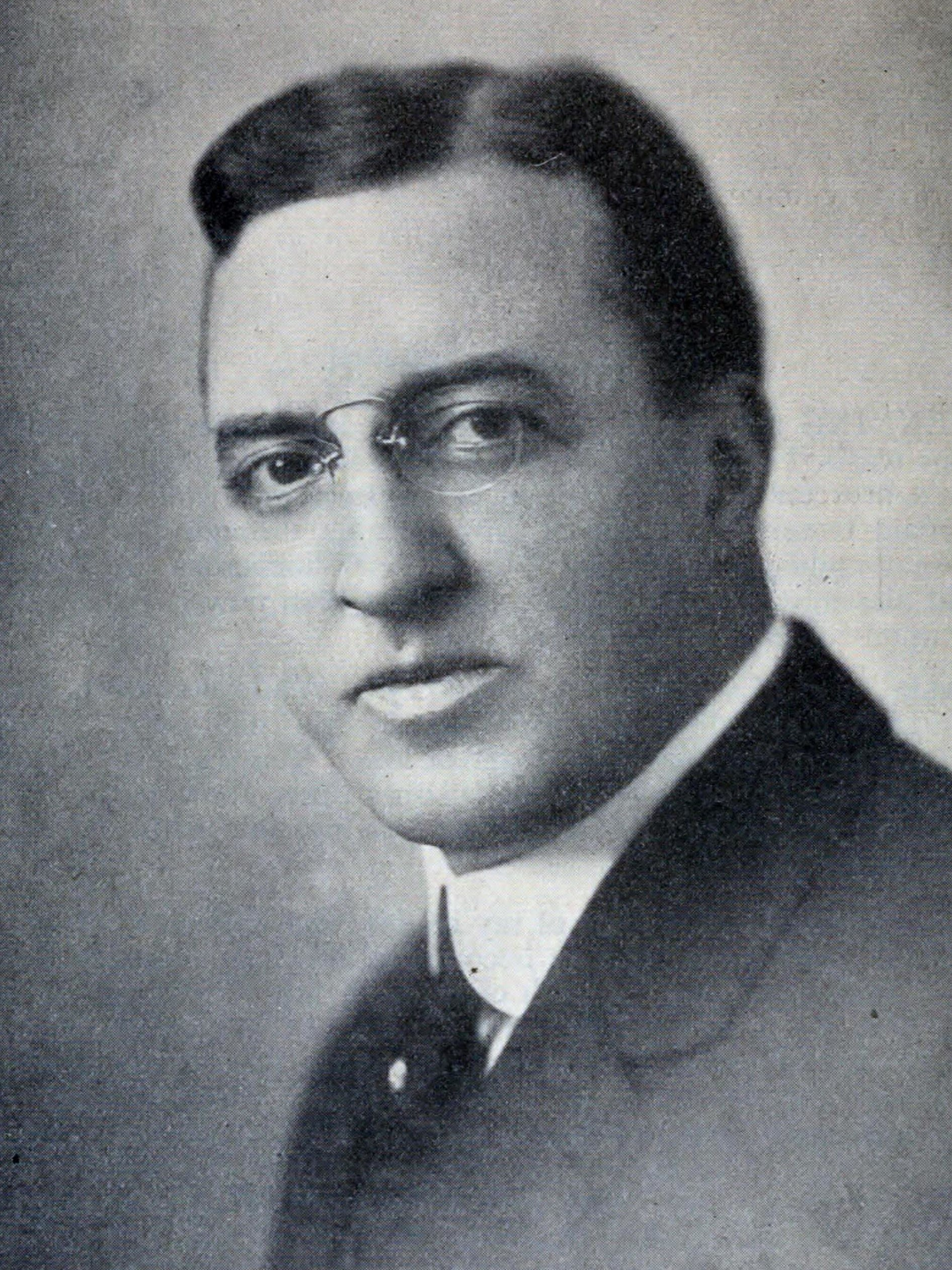

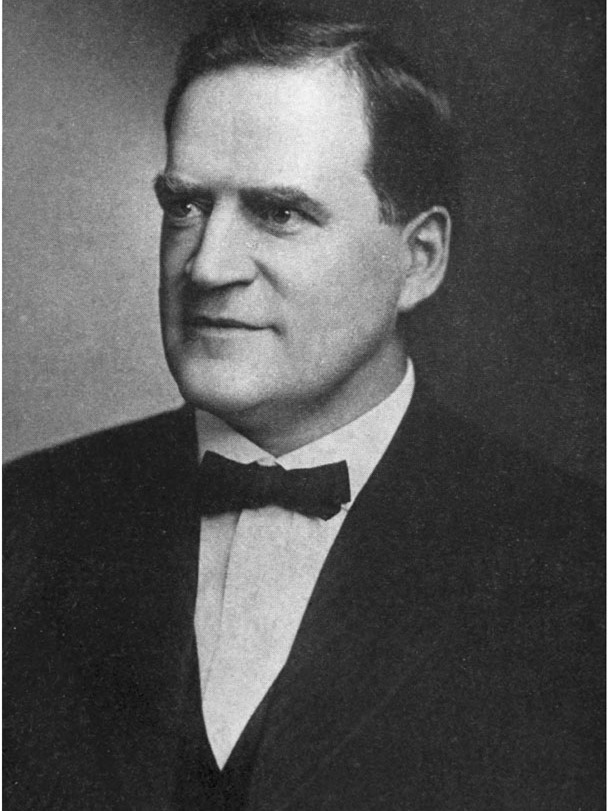
Nominee	William H. Thompson	Robert Sweitzer
Party	Republican	Democratic
Popular vote	259,828	238,206
Percentage	37.61%	34.48%
Nominee	Maclay Hoyne	John Fitzpatrick
Party	Independent	Cook County Labor Party
Popular vote	110,851	55,990
Percentage	16.05%	8.11%
Mayor before election
William H. Thompson
Republican
Elected mayor
William H. Thompson
Republican

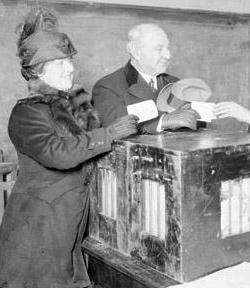
Democratic candidate Robert Sweitzer and his wife cast their votes in the election.

In the Chicago mayoral election of 1919, Republican William H. Thompson won reelection, winning a four-way race against Democrat Robert Sweitzer (who had also been his opponent in the previous election), independent candidate Maclay Hoyne, and Cook County Labor Party candidate John Fitzpatrick. Sweitzer was the incumbent Cook County clerk, while Hoyne was the incumbent Cook County state's attorney. Fitzpatrick was a trade unionist.

The two major parties both selected their nominees through primary elections. Sweitzer, who had also been Democratic Party's 1915 nominee, defeated Thomas Carey, the former chair of the Cook County Democratic Party, in the Democratic primary. Thompson won a large margin of the vote in the Republican Party primary over both Harry Olson, who had also been his opponent in the 1915 primary, and 1911 Republican mayoral nominee Charles E. Merriam.

== Nominations ==
=== Democratic primary ===
As in 1915, Roger Charles Sullivan backed Robert Sweitzer, the party's 1915 mayoral nominee, to again be the Democratic Party's mayoral nominee. Sweitzer easily won the Democratic primary.

The only significant individual initially willing to put themselves forth as a candidate was Tom Carey, former chair of the Cook County Democratic committee during the mayoral administration of Carter Harrison IV. The party's 1915 nominee Robert Sweitzer had originally explicitly indicated that he was not interested in running in 1919. There had been some initial rumors that Sullivan himself might run for mayor, however Sullivan killed these rumors. There was an effort to draft former mayor Harrison Harrison, serving overseas in the Red Cross in France during the ongoing world war, was coy about his plans. He only went as far as to pledge that, if Carey were to win the nomination, he would not challenge him as an independent candidate. Sullivan and his deputy John Brennan sought to find a candidate that could unify the disparate factions of the Democratic Party. They appeared to have found a compromise candidate in congressman James McAndrews, who got key approval from the Harrison-Dunne faction of the party. However, Sullivan was unable to get his own faction of the party to support McAndrews as a candidate, killing his viability as a compromise candidate.

Ultimately, Sweitzer agreed to run and received Sullivan's backing. Sweitzer was well-respected and, arguably, the most popular Democratic politician in Chicago. While the Harrison-Dunne factions were not enthusiastic about Sweitzer, Sullivan appeased them by having former governor Dunne author the party's 1919 platform, which voiced commitment to home rule for utility matters (protecting such matters from the authority of the state legislature), lower gas truces and greater oversight of the city's traction companies.

Sweitzer campaigned vigorously during his primary, delivering many speeches at many rallies. The theme of his campaign was, "I will".

Sweitzer faced the candidacy of Tom Carey. Carey, who had been an ally to Harrison during his mayoralty, sought the support of the remaining fragments of the party's Harrison wing. He ran initially as a stalking horse for Harrison, subsequently adjusting his strategy to instead run as the "preferred" candidate of Harrison (which proved ineffective as Harrison did not himself voice his preference). The death of Carey's wife in late January from appendicitis hampered his ability to campaign.

==== Results ====
Democratic Primary (February 25, 1919)
Party	Candidate	Votes	%
Democratic	Robert Sweitzer	109,175	68.71
Democratic	Thomas Carey	48,192	30.33
Democratic	John Max Heidelmeier	1,520	0.96
Total votes		158,887	100.00

=== Republican primary ===
In the lead-up to the 1919 election, Thompson had been dealt two embarrassing defeats. First, in the 1917 municipal elections Chicagoans voted in a manner which heralded a decisively anti-Thompsonian Chicago City Council. Secondly, Thompson had lost the 1918 Republican U.S. Senate primary.

Disappointed by his performance in the 1918 Republican U.S. Senate primary, and eager to revive his political capital by winning reelection, incumbent mayor William H. Thompson announced his campaign relatively early, doing so in the autumn of 1918. This forced his opponents to declare soon after.

Thompson had pressured city workers to rouse enthusiasm for him to seek reelection so he could artificially create a push to "draft" him for the third term.

Thompson fended off challenges from Harry Olson and Charles E. Merriam, the latter of whom had been the party's mayoral nominee in 1911 and the prior of whom had run against Thompson before in 1915.

Olson originally polled well. He had a strong reputation as a judge. He seemed a logical opponent, having the potential to appeal to those Republicans dissatisfied with the corruption of Thompson's administration and Thompsons anti-war appeals. Olson proved to be poor at campaigning. Olson campaigned with two messages being advanced in his favor, neither of which were persuasive enough to voters. One was that he was deemed acceptable by the city's political machine. The second was that someone needed to defeat Thompson, who had "disgraced Chicago" with (amongst other things) his anti-war rhetoric and actions, and that Olson would be that somebody to defeat Thompson. Olson also promised, "an administration of good, clean and honest housekeeping" and voiced interest in eugenics, the latter of which was off-putting to ethnic and black voters.

Fresh off of serving the army in Italy, former Hyde Park alderman Merriam angled to be a true alternative to Thompson. Despite lacking a strong organization, Merriam had confidence he could defeat Thompson. His campaign literature read, "I may be standing with my back to the wall, but I do not intend to forsake the men and women who asked me to lead this fight, not desert the claims of Chicago at this critical moment."

Presenting himself as "Captain Merriam", Merriam presented himself as a concerned army veteran that would bring democracy back into local government. His platform combined business and social reforms. As a means of improving civic engagement and providing for responsible government directorship, Merriam had championed a program of centralized planning and bureaucratic control. He promised efficient governance, running on a platform of "good government" which aimed to have public agencies run by trained experts. He promised to carefully increase home rule powers of the city, and to establish a postwar reconstruction commission. He also made a campaign issue of the fact that the Thompson administration was perceived to have driven Theodore B. Sachs to commit suicide.

Merriam warned of an "underworld" of "grafters and gunmen, gangsters and thugs" which was strongly connected with the "upper world" of urban politics. He argued that only civil service reform and "enlightened" government could properly serve the needs of the public. Merriam derided the system of political spoils and patronage overseen by Thompson as the "Big Fix". Merriam proclaimed, "What is the Big Fix? It is the combination of influences and agencies designed to control the political situation, and to be able to give immunity from the law. Never quite complete, it strives for completion, reaching out constantly for new connections and protections. Prosecuting officials, police, sheriffs, judges, mayors, governors were among the many meshes in the great net, recently designed to entwine and entangle the law. It was presumed that the Big Fix could fix anything thought by the hordes of fixers, little and otherwise."

Merriam aimed to appeal to wartime patriotism.

Merriam was supported by E. O. Hanson, a momentarily popular Chicagoan who was the brother of Seattle mayor Ole Hanson.

Dirty tricks occurred in the primary. Thompson planted city workers in the audience at to heckle Merriam at a January 6 debate between the two at the Masonic Temple, which ultimately resulted in fistfight breaking out. Merriam did not stop vigilante soldiers' and sailors' organizations from intimidating Thompson campaign workers in the city's downtown.

The news press overall sided against Thompson's renomination effort. However, in 1919, amid the continuation of traction disputes and other utility disputes, many of the newspapers were now seen as supporting candidates friendly to the utility corporations, meaning that their antagonism of Thompson was consequentially ineffective at persuading many voters. Thompson managed to conceal his own loyalties to utility owners from the eyes of many voters. Existing popular disapproval of the press had also played a role in the ineffectiveness of their endorsements and coverage against Thompson. Thompson played up the fact that both the city's largest morning and afternoon papers had investments in land leased by Chicago schools, thus controversially profited from school land. Thompson persuaded voters that the prime reason newspapers opposed him was his opposition to this land arrangement. He made the school land issue one of his prime issues during his primary campaign.

==== Results ====
It was considered surprising that Thompson managed to secure a large enough share of the vote to garner an absolute majority.

Merriam's defeat in the primary killed his political career.

Republican primary (February 25, 1919)
Party	Candidate	Votes	%
Republican	William H. Thompson (incumbent)	123,976	54.91
Republican	Harry Olson	84,030	37.22
Republican	Charles E. Merriam	17,785	7.88
Total votes		225,791	100.00

=== Cook County Labor nomination ===
Inspired by the Bolshevik revolution in Russia (the ramifications of which had not yet been fully understood in America), union figures organized to create the Independent Labor Party of Cook County. The party nominated John Fitzpatrick, the esteemed chairman of the Chicago Federation of Labor.

Fitzpatrick claimed to be motivated to run after, in November 1918, city council (in Fitzpatrick's belief, acting under the direction of Rodger Sullivan) nixed a deal he had brokered with Mayor Thompson to appoint two union figures to the city's school board.

To formally nominate Fitzpatrick and a party ticket to run alongside him, an executive committee was formed and a convention of approximately 400 delegates was held. Among those participating in the convention was Margaret Haley of the Chicago Federation of Teachers.

The party's stated goal was to create (modeled after the Bolsheviks) a soldiers and sailors council to promote the advancement of "political and industrial democracy at home".

=== Socialist nomination ===
The Socialist Party nominated John Collins. He had previously been their nominee in the 1901 Chicago mayoral election and 1905, as well in the 1904 Illinois gubernatorial election and the 1908 Illinois lieutenant gubernatorial election.

=== Socialist Labor nomination ===
The Socialist Labor Party nominated Adolph S. Carm.

=== Independent candidates ===
Cook County State's Attorney Maclay Hoyne ran as an independent candidate. His campaign committee featured Clarence Darrow, Donald Richberg, and E. O. Hanson.

Originally, in early February 1919, Lenore O. Meder announced her intentions to run as an independent candidate, marking the entrance of a female candidate. Meder was a lawyer, and had previously served as a public works commissioner. In announcing her candidacy, Meder remarked, "There is no reason why a woman cannot govern the second largest city in the United States. Can you name one of the candidates who has thrown his hat into the ring who is better qualified than I?" Meder, ultimately, was not on the ballot in the general election, having not formally filed her candidacy. It would not be until 1935 that a woman (Grace A. Gray) would for the first time file to run as a candidate for mayor of Chicago.

== General election ==
=== Campaigning ===
Thompson focused his campaign on national issues, rather than on municipal matters. At one point Thompson told voters,

As Chicago goes in April, so will go the nation in 1920. Do you want Democratic rule and bread lines or Republicanism and prosperity?

Thompson also focused on international affairs, such as advocating Irish independence and supporting for the free trade policies of former president Grover Cleveland.

Thompson accused Sweitzer, as county clerk, of having ignored the tearful pleas of a White mother when he issued (African American) boxer Jack Johnson a license to marry the woman's daughter. This accusation, while a racist dog whistle, did not damage Thompson's own popularity in the city's Black wards.

After Chicago's business elite threw their support behind Sweitzer, Thompson derided them as being, "tax dodgers, possessors of swollen fortunes and robbers of the working classes."

Thompson continued to villainize the city's newspapers, as he had in his primary campaign. All major newspapers were opposed to Thompson, with the exception of those owned by news magnate William Randolph Hearst. However, Hearst himself had personally backed Hoyne. As he had in his previous campaign, Thompson demonized the news industry. He distributed bills with the slogan, "By voting for Mayor William Thompson you fight the commercialized newspapers who cheat the school children and you"

Thompson managed to avoid addressing criticisms brought by Sweitzer and Hoyne, and instead touted his own virtues, portraying himself as a patriotic American dedicated to protecting the citizens' constitutional rights.

Thompson had strong appeal to African American voters. This support attracted attacks from Democrats residing in White South Side neighborhoods. Thompson also made an effort to appeal to Germans and other groups.

Sweitzer criticized Thompson's governance, and promised as mayor that he would bring about an efficient and honest government that would not be of embarrassment to the city.

Sweitzer attempted to appeal to working-class voters. He primarily attacked Thompson for corruption. Sweitzer was a "wet", meaning that he was against prohibition, which many around the country had been advocating for at the time.

Independent candidate Hoyne attempted to appeal to the "better element" vote. He labeled the two major party nominees as the "gasocracy", deriding their alleged connections to utility companies. Hoyne printed leaflets reprinting old German-language campaign buttons of the previous campaigns by Sweitzer and Thompson, attempting to take advantage of World War I sentiments about Germany writing, "This is the sort of Appeal to Racial Prejudice that us a Slur on American Citizenship". Hoyne criticized African American support for Thompson, saying, "Since his election as mayor, Thompson has never ceased playing to the Negro vote. He has appealed to their prejudices and to their resentment against their actual and fancied grievances." Hoyne received the backing of parts of the remaining members of the Democratic Party's Harrison faction, as well as many of the Republicans that had supported Merriam. Late in the race, former mayor Harrison came out in support of Hoyne, calling him Chicago's "only hope".

All three of the leading candidates (Thompson, Sweitzer, and Hoyne) were perceived to be amicable towards the city's African-American population.

Democrats failed to attain party unity. Hoyne ultimately diverted potential support away from Robert Sweitzer.

Fitzpatrick received strong backing from many trade unions.

A debate was held during the campaign between Thompson and Sweitzer.

Overall, the general election campaign was considered to be relatively tame compared to other Chicago mayoral elections of the era. The Sweitzer and Thompson campaigns kept rather amicable relations between each other until the closing days of the campaign. However, near the end of the election, as tensions increased, violence became more regular.

=== Endorsements ===
Maclay Hoyne (independent)
- Clarence Darrow, attorney and Georgist activist
- E. O. Hanson
- Carter Harrison IV, former mayor of Chicago
- William Randolph Hearst, news magnate and former congressman
- Charles Edward Merriam, 1911 Republican mayoral nominee
- Donald Richberg, attorney
Robert Sweitzer (Democrat)

Officeholders

- Edward Fitzsimmons Dunne, former Governor of Illinois and former mayor of Chicago
- Adolph Sabath, congressman
- Roger Charles Sullivan
- Bernard W. Snow, 1918 Republican nominee for Cook County Treasurer. former alderman from the 7th ward, former chair of the Cook County Republican Party
- Emil C. Wetten, former First Assistant Corporation Counsel of Chicago

=== Results ===
1919 Chicago mayoral election (general election)
Party	Candidate	Votes	%
Republican	William H. Thompson (incumbent)	259,828	37.61
Democratic	Robert Sweitzer	238,206	34.48
Independent	Maclay Hoyne	110,851	16.05
Cook County Labor Party	John Fitzpatrick	55,990	8.11
Socialist	John Collins	24,079	3.49
Socialist Labor	Adolph S. Carm	1,848	0.27
Turnout		690,802	89

Many of Thompson's votes came from German and African American voters. Polls showed that Thompson received as much as 78% of the African American vote. By some accounts, Sweitzer received a mere 23% of the African American vote. Nearly half of Thompson's margin of victory alone was amassed in the black Second Ward. His margin of victory in the combined vote of the black Second and Third Wards was 15,000. The contribution of Chicago's growing African-American population to the reelection of a mayor many in the city found to be abhorrent fed racial animosity.

Polls showed that Thompson received 13.48% of the Polish-American vote, while Sweitzer received 53.80%, Hoyne received 14.58%, Collins received 1.41%, other candidates received a combined 16.15%.

Thompson's victory was widely attributed to the four-way split of the vote, with Hoyne and Fitzpatrick siphoning off enough likely Democratic voters, acting as spoilers. Another important factor in Thompson's victory, however, was the African American support he received.

== Aftermath ==
National and local newspapers' reactions to Thompson's reelection were heavily critical. Newspapers across the country printed headlines such as, "Poor Old Chicago", "Un-American Wins", "Chicago's Shame", and "Copperhead Victorious".

The State-Journal of Lincoln, Nebraska commented, "A plurality of Chicago voters wanted more of Mayor Thompson, and they have got them. That is their business, and their funeral."

In contrast with most newspapers, some heralded Thompson's reelection. The Northwest Tribune (founded by Lundin) and the German-American Illinois Staats-Zeitung both celebrated Thompson's reelection.
