= Robert N. Ogden Jr. =

American politician

Robert Nash Ogden Jr (May 5, 1839 – April 16, 1905) was an author, Confederate lieutenant colonel, judge, orator, poet, lawyer and Speaker of the Louisiana House of Representatives.

Robert Nash Ogden Jr was born in Baton Rouge, Louisiana on May 5, 1839, to Robert Nash Ogden and Frances Sophia Nicholson. He attended the University of North Carolina for two and a half years. He studied law under Frederick Nash at Hillsboro, North Carolina. During the American Civil War he served under Brigadier General James Patrick Major for the Confederate Army with the rank of lieutenant colonel. When the war was over he returned to Louisiana and entered politics. After having been elected to the State Legislature, he served as Speaker of the House of Representatives (1880–1884). Then he went on to serve on the Louisiana Court of Appeals in New Orleans for two terms. Ogden was known for his skills as an orator as well as devoting his time to writing works of literature such as Who did it? - A novel(1870) Dreams of the past! and The Light of Thine Eyes.

He is the father of author Edith Ogden Harrison and the father-in-law of Carter Harrison IV (who served as mayor of Chicago).

Political offices
Preceded by John Conway Moncure	Speaker of the Louisiana House of Representatives; 1880–1884	Succeeded by Henry W. Ogden
