= Louis Bush (politician) =

American politician (1820–1892)

Speaker of the Louisiana House of Representatives
- In office 1877–1878
- Preceded by: Michael Hahn
- Succeeded by: John Conway Moncure

Personal details
- Born: December 20, 1820 Iberville Parish, Louisiana
- Died: August 10, 1892 (aged 71) Palmyra, Wisconsin
- Party: Democratic

Louis Jean Bush was an American state legislator in Louisiana who served as the 37th speaker of the Louisiana House of Representatives from 1877 to 1878. He represented Orleans Parish in the Louisiana House of Representatives from 1876 to 1878 as part of the Democratic Party. Bush was the son of Reuben Bush and Ludivine Brasset Bush. He was a delegate to Louisiana State Secession Convention and then a captain for the Confederate States of America, raising to the rank of colonel.
