= John Conway Moncure =

American politician (1827–1915)

Speaker of the Louisiana House of Representatives
- In office 1879–1880
- Preceded by: Louis Bush
- Succeeded by: Robert N. Ogden Jr.

Personal details
- Born: 1827
- Died: 1915 (aged 87–88)
- Party: Democratic

John Conway Moncure (1827 – 1915) was an American state legislator who served as the 38th speaker of the Louisiana House of Representatives from 1879 to 1880. He represented Caddo Parish in the Louisiana House of Representatives in 1871 and from 1879 to 1880 as part of the Democratic Party. He was a major for the Confederate States of America. From 1880 to 1896, Moncure served on the First Circuit Court of Appeals.
