= Edith Ogden Harrison =

American novelist

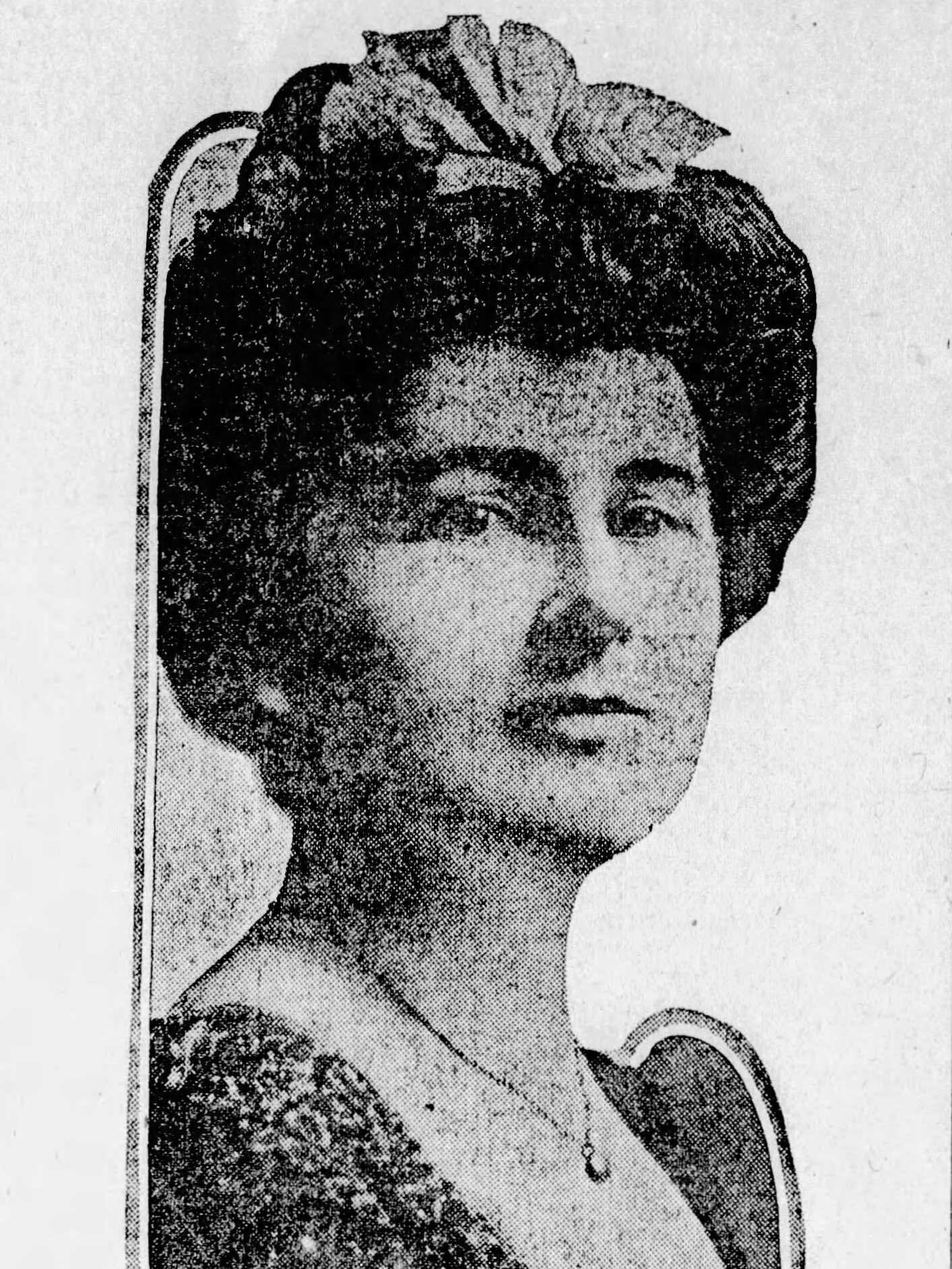

Edith Ogden Harrison (16 November 1862 – 22 May 1955) was a writer of children's books and fairy tales in the early decades of the 20th century. She was the wife of Carter Harrison, Jr., five-term mayor of Chicago.

== Biography ==
Edith Ogden was born to Judge Robert N. Ogden, Jr. and Sarah L Beattie, and raised in New Orleans, Louisiana; she was a "belle of cultured, aristocratic habits who acquitted herself well in the parlors of the Potter Palmers and Marshall Fields" and other Chicago notables. Her grandfather was Judge Ogden Sr., nephew of Senator Aaron Ogden, later Governor of New Jersey, and her granduncle was Justice Abner Nash Ogden.

She married Carter Harrison IV on December 14, 1887. Their first child died in infancy in 1889; they had two surviving children, Carter Henry Harrison V, born June 28, 1891, and Edith Ogden Harrison II, born January 21, 1896. (Their son was the fifth of that name because his father was, formally, Carter Henry Harrison IV. He was known in his political career as "Junior" because his father, Carter Henry Harrison III, had preceded him in office and had been one of Chicago's most famous mayors. Confusion arises when "Junior" is erroneously referred to as "Carter Harrison II.") The couple celebrated the fiftieth wedding anniversary in 1937.

In the first phase of her literary career, Edith O. Harrison concentrated on children's literature; later she wrote travel books and autobiographical works. Her early book Prince Silverwings was adapted by family acquaintance L. Frank Baum for a dramatization that never made it to the stage. (All Chicago theaters were closed after the Iroquois Theater fire on 30 December 1903 caused 570 fatalities.) In the process, influences from Harrison's book appear to have found their way into Baum's works.

She did not abandon her theatrical ambitions: over a number of years Harrison and Baum tried to establish a children's theater in Chicago. They were still working on the project as late as 1915, but without success.

Harrison's 1912 novel The Lady of the Snows was made into a film of the same title in 1915.

== Works ==
- Prince Silverwings and other fairy tales, illustrated by Lucy Fitch Perkins (A. C. McClurg, 1902)
- The Star Fairies and other fairy tales, illus. Perkins (1903)
- The Moon Princess, a fairy tale, illus. Perkins (1905)
- The Flaming Sword and other legends of the earth and sky, illus. Perkins (1908)
- Ladder of Moonlight; Cotton Myth, illus. Perkins (McClurg, 1909) – Biblical stories retold for children
- The Mocking-bird; Sunrise and Sunset, illus. Perkins (McClurg, 1909) – Biblical stories retold for children
- Polar Star; Aurora Borealis, illus. Perkins (McClurg, 1909) – Biblical stories retold for children
- Princess Sayrane: a romance of the days of Prester John, illus. Harold H. Betts (1910)
- The Glittering Festival, illus. Clara Powers Wilson (1911)
- The Lady of the Snows, illus. J. Allen St. John (1912)
- The Enchanted House and other fairy stories , illus. Frederick Richardson (1913)
- Clemencia's Crisis, illus. Fred J. Arting (1915)
- Below the Equator: the story of a tour through the countries of South America (McClurg, 1918)
- All the Way 'Round: the story of a fourteen months' trip around the world (1922)
- Lands of the Sun: Impressions of a visit to tropical lands (McClurg, 1925)
- Gray Moss (Chicago: Ralph Fletcher Seymour Publisher, 1929)
- The Scarlet Riders (Seymour, 1930)
- "Strange to Say": Recollections of persons and events in New Orleans and Chicago (Chicago: A. Kroch, 1949)

Written by husband Carter H. Harrison

- Stormy Years: the autobiography of Carter H. Harrison, five times mayor of Chicago, illus. Edith Ogden Harrison (Bobbs-Merrill, 1935), OCLC 1563864
- Growing up with Chicago (Seymour, 1944) – sequel to Stormy Years OCLC 1210413
