= Carter Harrison IV =

American politician (1860–1953)

Carter Harrison
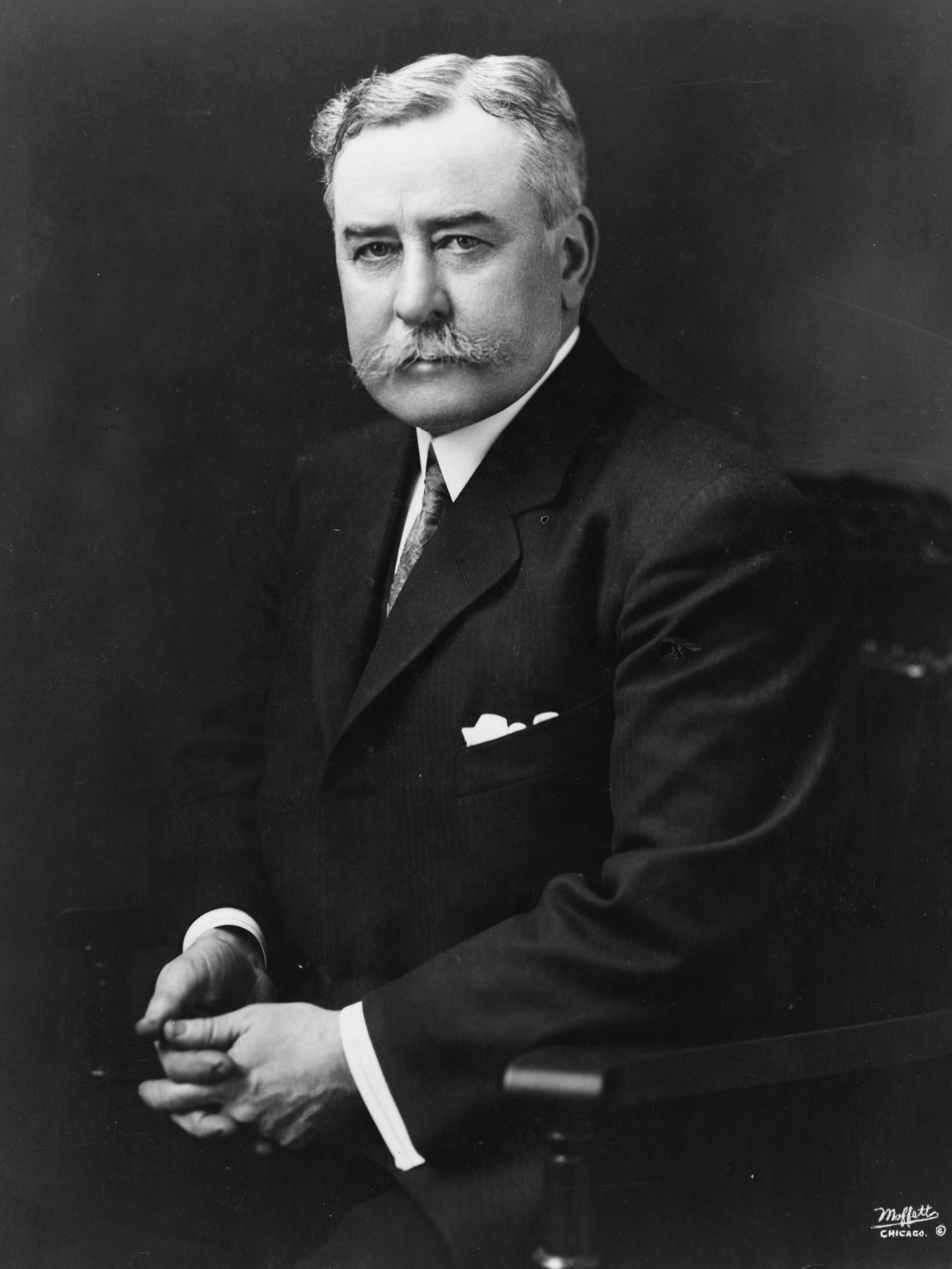
- Harrison in 1911

37th & 40th Mayor of Chicago
- In office April 17, 1911 – April 26, 1915
- Preceded by: Fred A. Busse
- Succeeded by: William Hale Thompson
- In office April 15, 1897 – April 10, 1905
- Preceded by: George Bell Swift
- Succeeded by: Edward Fitzsimmons Dunne

IRS Collector for the District of Chicago
- In office July 28, 1933 – 1944
- President: Franklin D. Roosevelt

Personal details
- Born: Carter Henry Harrison; April 23, 1860 Chicago, Illinois
- Died: December 25, 1953 (aged 93) Chicago, Illinois
- Party: Democratic
- Spouse: Edith Ogden
- Children: Carter Harrison V Edith Ogden Harrison II
- Parent: Carter Harrison III (father)
- Education: College of St. Ignatius; Yale Law School

Carter Henry Harrison IV (April 23, 1860 – December 25, 1953) was an American newspaper publisher and Democratic politician who served a total of five terms as mayor of Chicago (1897–1905 and 1911–1915) but failed in his attempt to become his party's presidential nominee in 1904. Descended from aristocratic Virginia families and the son of five-term Chicago mayor Carter Harrison III, this Carter Harrison (IV) became the first native Chicagoan (Note: "native Chicagoan" meaning someone who was born in the city) elected its mayor.

A 1994 survey of experts on Chicago politics assessed Harrison as one of the ten best mayors in the city's history (up to that time). (Note: The others in the top-ten were Anton Cermak (mayor 1931–33); Richard J. Daley (mayor 1955–76); Richard M. Daley (then-incumbent mayor since 1989); Edward Fitzsimmons Dunne (mayor 1905–07); Carter Harrison III (mayor 1879–1887 and 1893); Edward Joseph Kelly (mayor 1933–47); William B. Ogden (mayor 1837–38); Harold Washington (mayor 1983–87); John Wentworth (mayor 1857–58 and 1860–61))

== Early life and career ==
Harrison was born on April 23, 1860, in Chicago at his family residence at the corner of the streets that are today known as Clark and Harrison.

Harrison's father, Carter Harrison III, served as mayor of Chicago and was assassinated in October 1893.

Harrison received his early education in Chicago, before finishing in Saxe-Altenburg, Germany. He attended college in Chicago at the College of St. Ignatius, graduating in its class of 1881. He attended the Yale Law School, receiving his law degree in 1883.

Harrison practiced as a lawyer for five years, before returning to Chicago to help his brother Preston run the Chicago Times (which their father bought in 1891). Under the Harrisons the paper became a resolute supporter of the Democratic Party, and was the only local newspaper to support the Pullman strikers in the mid-1890s. Harrison served as the newspaper's managing editor, while his brother served as its business manager. The family sold the newspaper after the 1894 Pullman Strike, and Harrison stopped working there in 1895. The newspaper was soon merged with the Chicago Herald to form the Chicago Times-Herald. After leaving the newspaper industry, Harrison entered the real estate industry and saw success.

== Political career ==
Similarly to his father, Harrison IV won election to five terms as Chicago's mayor.

=== First mayoralty ===
Harrison was first elected mayor in the 1897 Chicago mayoral election. He would win election to three consecutive additional two-year terms in 1899, 1901, and 1903.

Harrison was sworn in as mayor on April 15, 1897.

Like his father, Harrison did not believe in trying to legislate morality. As mayor, Harrison believed that Chicagoans' two major desires were to make money and to spend it. During his administrations, Chicago's vice districts blossomed, and special maps were printed to enable tourists to find their way from brothel to brothel. The name of one Chicago saloon-keeper of the time entered the English language as a term for a strong or laced drink intended to render unconsciousness: Mickey Finn.

In the late-1890s, Altgeld aligned himself with the free silver and William Jennings Bryan-aligned wings of the national Democratic party. Harrison was speculated as a potential candidate for his party's 1900 presidential nomination.

However, Harrison was seen as more of a reformer than his father, which helped him garner the middle class votes his father had lacked. One of Harrison's biggest enemies was Charles Yerkes, whose plans to monopolize Chicago's streetcar lines were vigorously attacked by the mayor. This was the beginning of the Chicago Traction Wars, which would become a major focus of his administration. During his final term in office, Harrison established the Chicago Vice Commission and worked to close down the Levee district, starting with the Everleigh Club brothel on October 24, 1911.

Despite prolonged and damaging international press coverage blaming his lax municipal enforcement for the 602 lives lost in the Iroquois Theatre fire on December 30, 1903 (still the deadliest single-building fire in U.S. history), Harrison hoped to become the 1904 Democratic nominee for President of the United States. However, he was unsuccessful in this effort. The nomination went to Alton B. Parker, who was soundly defeated by Theodore Roosevelt.

Harrison declined to seek a fifth consecutive mayoral term in 1905, and was succeeded by fellow Democrat Edward Fitzsimmons Dunne on April 10, 1905.

=== Between mayoralties ===
In 1907, attempting to stage a return to office, Harrison unsuccessfully challenged Dunne for the Democratic mayoral nomination.

=== Second mayoralty ===
In 1911, Harrison was elected to a four-year term as mayor. He was sworn in for his fifth nonconsecutive term as mayor on April 17, 1911.

In 1914, Harrison convinced the city council to establish a Commission for the Encouragement of Local Art to purchase works of art by Chicago artists. Harrison personally purchased artwork from painters such as Victor Higgins and Walter Ufer.

Harrison sought a sixth overall term as mayor in 1915, but was defeated in the Democratic primary by Robert Sweitzer, who went on to lose the general election to Republican William Hale Thompson. Harrison was succeeded in office by Thompson on April 26, 1915.

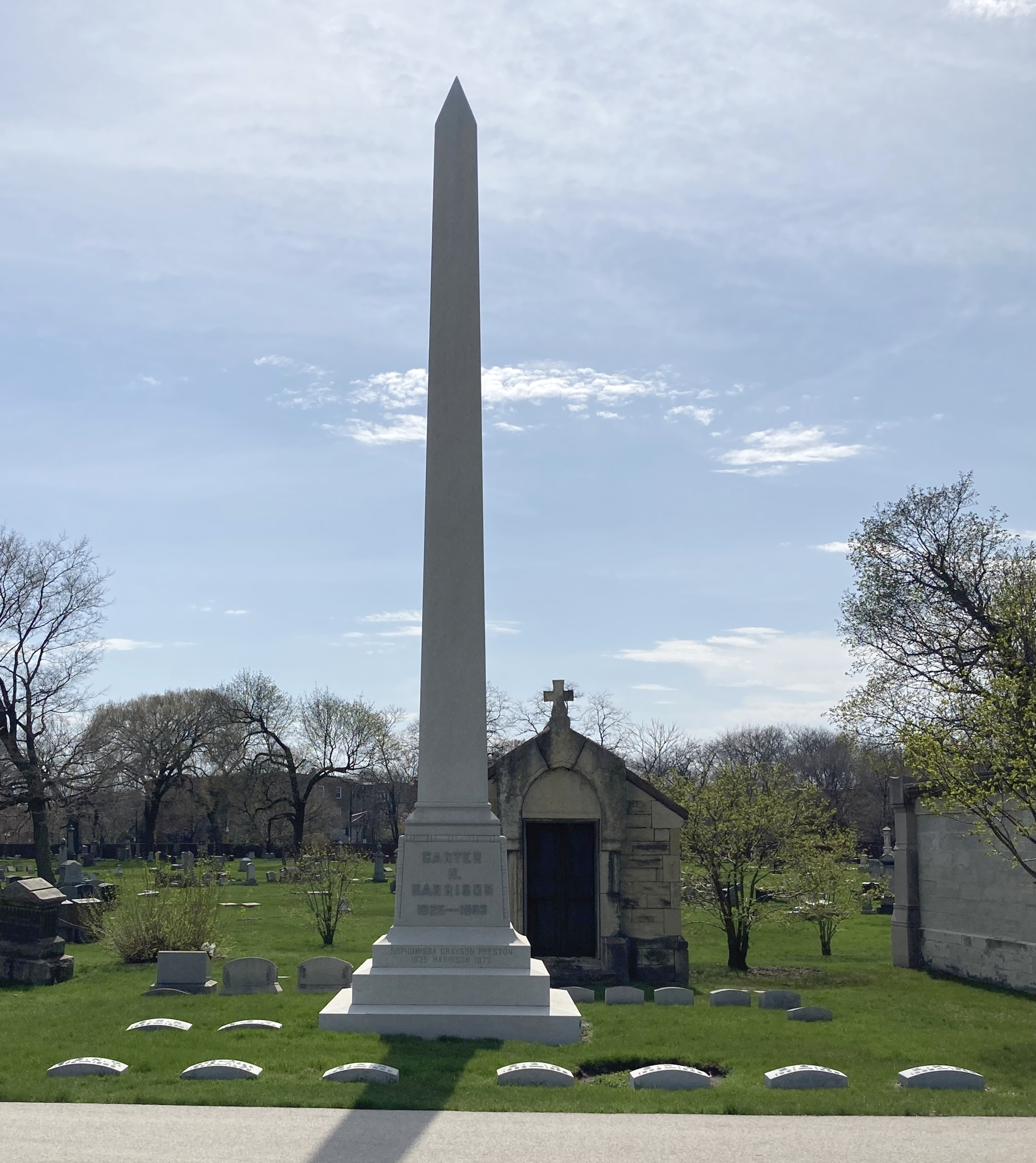
Harrison's grave (front row, third from right) at Graceland Cemetery

In 1915, when Harrison left office, Chicago had essentially reached its modern size in land area, and had a population of 2,400,000; the city was moving inexorably into its status as a major modern metropolis. He and his father had collectively been mayors of the city for 21 of the previous 36 years.

A 1994 survey of experts on Chicago politics saw Harrison ranked as one of the ten-best mayors in the city's history (up to that time).

== Post-mayoralty ==
From 1933 through 1944, Harrison served as the Internal Revenue Service's collector for district of Chicago. He was appointed to this position by president Franklin D. Roosevelt on July 28, 1933.

Harrison served as the president of a commission which advocated for local arts.

He published two autobiographies. One of these, a memoir entitled Growing Up with Chicago, was published in 1944.

Harrison died on December 25, 1953, at his Chicago apartment, and is buried in Graceland Cemetery.

His papers are held by Chicago's Newberry Library.

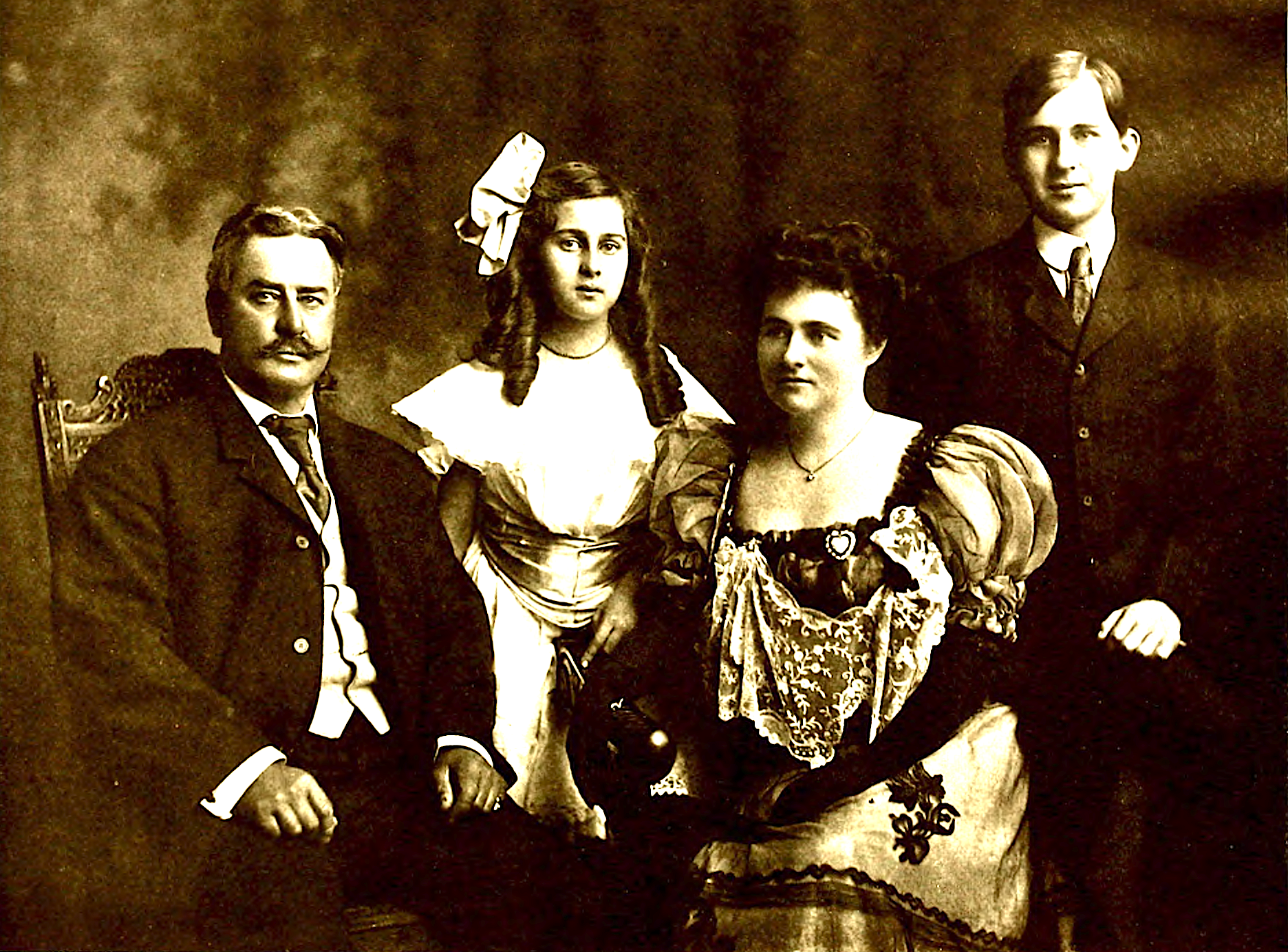
Harrison with his wife and children

== Ancestry and personal life ==
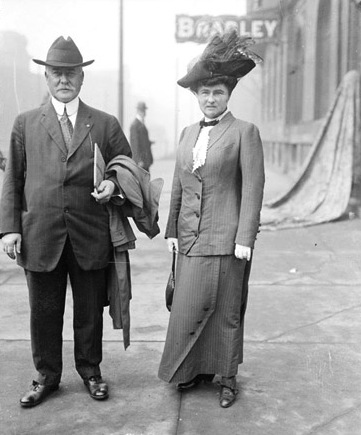
Carter and Edith Ogden on a sidewalk (likely near North Rush Street and East Grand Avenue, 1913)

Harrison was a descendant of Robert Carter I, Benjamin Harrison IV, William Randolph, and Isham Randolph of Dungeness.

Harrison's wife, Edith Ogden Harrison, was a well-known writer of children's books and fairy tales in the first two decades of the 20th century.

Harrison as regarded to be an avid outdoorsman and sportsman. He appreciated nature, and also partook in equestrianism and horseback riding. A skilled angler, he had gone fishing in states such as Michigan and Florida as well as abroad in countries such as Egypt and Switzerland.

He was a member of many organizations including the Freemasons, Society of the Cincinnati, Sons of the Revolution, Sons of the American Revolution, Society of Colonial Wars, Veterans of Foreign Wars, American Legion, and the Military Order of the World Wars. He was also a member of Chicago's Century Cycling Club. In 1907 Harrison became a hereditary member of the Virginia Society of the Cincinnati.
