= John Fitzpatrick (unionist) =

American trade unionist (1870–1946)

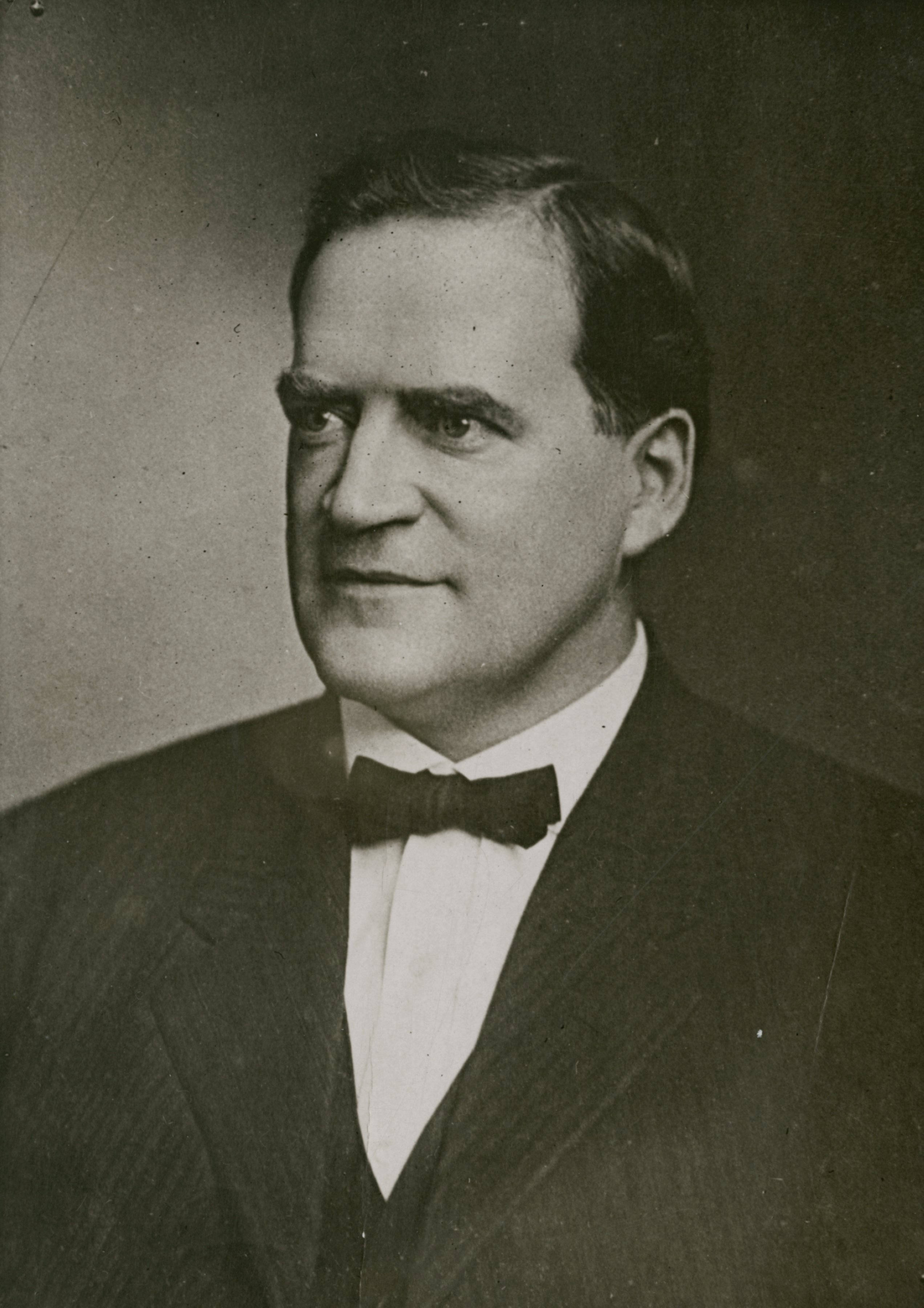
John Fitzpatrick

John Fitzpatrick (1870–1946) was an Irish-born American trade union leader. He is best remembered as the longtime head of the powerful Chicago Federation of Labor, from 1906 until his death in 1946.

== Early years ==
John Fitzpatrick was born in Ireland on April 21, 1870. He attended grammar school in Ireland before coming to the United States in 1882, at the age of 11, settling in Chicago. Following completion of his formal education, Fitzpatrick went to work as a horseshoer, becoming involved in the International Journeyman Horseshoers' Union (IJHU), with which he remained affiliated for the next three decades.

== Union career ==
Fitzpatrick served variously as the President, Treasurer, and business agent for the Chicago local of the IJHU, being selected as a delegate to conventions of the union as well as its representative to the American Federation of Labor (AF of L). This connection was instrumental in Fitzpatrick's appointment as the organizer of the Chicago Federation of Labor, city affiliate of the AF of L, in 1902. Fitzpatrick was additionally elected President of that organization in 1906 and remained in that capacity throughout the ensuing half century.

Fitzpatrick was widely regarded as a progressive voice in the trade union movement, active in political fights beyond the ordinary hours-and-wages concerns which has traditionally dominated the union movement. He was active in the defense campaign on behalf of accused bomber Thomas Mooney, and was active in helping to organize packing house workers and steel workers in 1919.

During these campaigns, Fitzpatrick came into close contact with radical trade union organizer William Z. Foster, founder of the Trade Union Educational League and outspoken advocate of the amalgamation of the hodge-podge of existing craft unions into unified (and thus more effective) industrial unions.

Fitzpatrick was also an advocate of independent labor politics and was one of the organizers of the Illinois Labor Party as well as its local affiliate, the Cook County Labor party. In November 1919, Fitzpatrick ran for mayor of Chicago on the ticket of the Cook County Labor Party and received a substantial vote of 60,000 of the 580,000 ballots cast. Bolstered by the degree of support which the new organization received from voters, Fitzpatrick called a national convention of local Labor Party movements, which was held in Chicago on November 22, 1919.

== Death and legacy ==
Fitzpatrick remained as President of the Chicago Federation of Labor until his death in 1946, with the exception of a single year, 1908, when Charles M. Dold served as head of the organization.
