= The Levee, Chicago =

Vice district of Chicago

- Vice district
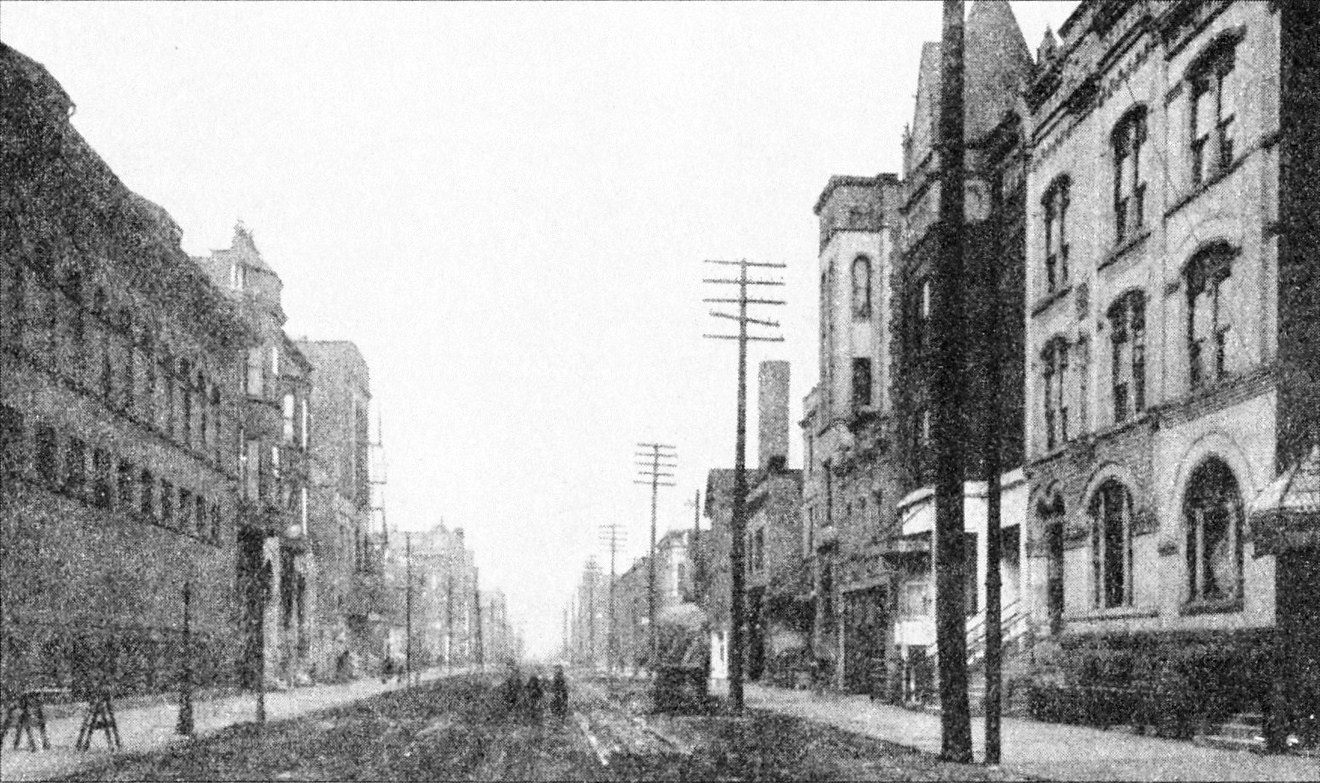
- South Dearborn Street in the Levee, c. 1911. The Everleigh Club, a notorious high-priced brothel, is on the far right.

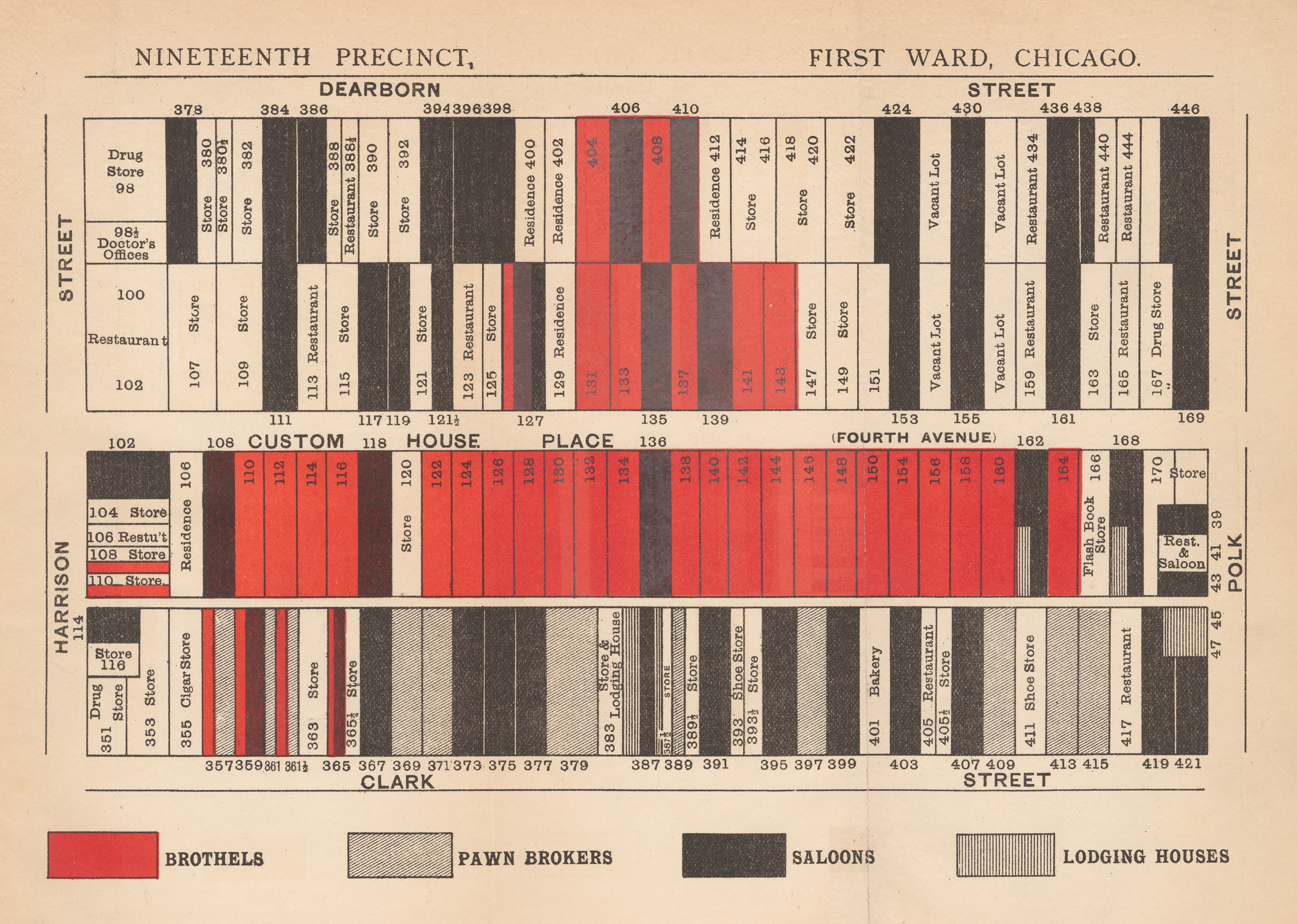
- Map of the 19th Precinct and 1st Ward at Chicago by Stead W. T, in his book "If Christ came to Chicago! A Plea for the Union of All Who Love in the Service of All Who Suffer", records 46 saloons, 37 "houses of ill-fame", and 11 pawnbrokers in 1894.

- Location of the Levee within Chicago
- Coordinates: 41.856°N 87.629°W
- Country: United States
- State: Illinois
- City: Chicago

The Levee District was the red-light district of Chicago from the 1880s until 1912, when police raids shut it down. The district, like many frontier town red-light districts, got its name from its proximity to wharves in the city. The Levee district encompassed four blocks in Chicago's South Loop area, initially between Harrison and Polk, between Clark and Dearborn, and then the newer Levee district, between 18th and 22nd streets. It was home to many brothels, saloons, dance halls, and the famed Everleigh Club. Prostitution boomed in the Levee District, and it was not until the Chicago Vice Commission submitted a report on the city's vice districts that it was shut down.

== History ==
The Chicago nightlife district was initially located downtown in the First District. However, after the Great Fire of Chicago in 1871, it moved to the south of the city. Before 1890, the area known as Customs House Levee became a gathering place for players and pimps, and was one of the most notorious criminal districts in Chicago. According to one newspaper, Chicago was at that time considered "the most violent, dirtiest cities – loud, lawless, ugly, offensive, godless; an oversized, stupid village." In cooperation with the Chicago Outfit, corrupt city councilors "Hinky Dink" Michael Kenna and "Bathhouse" John Coughlin, precipitated the rapid rise of vice in the district. From 1893 the pair organized a protection racket in which game parlors and brothels in The Levee had to pay protection money. Kenna and Coughlin formed a group of corrupt city councilors called "Gray Wolves", which was active from 1890 to 1930.

The Levee District was home to many brothels, saloons, dance halls, and similar places. Chicago's first brothels were built on Wells Street. Among the most famous establishments were:

- The House of All Nations (between Archer Street and Cullerton Street), where, similar to the Parisian establishment of the same name, girls from different countries of the world could be found
- The Little Green House on Bed Bug Row
- The Bucket of Blood, a saloon on the southwest corner of 19th Street and Federal. This bar was mentioned in a newspaper in 1916 for serving still liquor after the curfew. The name most likely comes from the fact that in the morning, after numerous brawls and stabbings, blood had to be cleaned from the floor.
- Ed Weiss's Capitol, a dance hall owned by Ed Weiss whose brother Louis also owned the brothel The Sapphos
- Freiberg's Dance Hall, a brothel between 22nd Street, Wabash Avenue and State Street. The restaurant offered a bar, dance floor and contact with prostitutes. According to the Chicago Vice Commission, the dance hall was one of the most infamous venues in Chicago, after it was learned that women were often kidnapped and forced into prostitution from there. Kenna and Coughlin resided at Freiberg's Dance Hall. It closed on August 24, 1914.
- Everleigh Club, led by Ada and Minna Everleigh on Dearborn Street, was regularly frequented by the society's elite. The prostitutes, who called themselves "butterflies", earned $100 to $400 per week in the brothel, which were phenomenal sums for the time given the prevailing daily wages elsewhere. From this club came the contemporary phrase "I'm going to get Everleighed", which most likely later became the colloquialism "get laid".

The lowest level of the brothels formed the simple houses in the Bed Bug Row, spanning from Dearborn Street and Federal to 19th Street and Archer. The women of color who worked there offered $0.25 services, often under poor hygienic conditions. The Bed Bug Row had a similar bad reputation to the "Cribs" in New Orleans or the "cowyards" in San Francisco.

In order to receive protection, Levee inhabitants would attend the biggest event in the district, the annual First Ward Ball. There, Levee residents gathered to celebrate the triumphs brought to them by "Hinky Dink" Kenna and "Bathhouse" Coughlin. Madams, corrupt businessmen, dance-hall owners, saloon owners, prostitutes, brothel owners, and gamblers attended the event to support these aldermen. The money raised came from the purchase of tickets to the event and of alcohol.

When anti-vice reformers protested the ball, Kenna justified it as benefiting the people in the district through educational and community programs. The First Ward Ball of 1908 was the most significant because it was the last one to be attended by the Levee's most prominent figures. That year, anti-vice reformers tried to stop the ball by bombing its venue, The Coliseum. The ball was uninterrupted; however, in 1909, anti-vice reformers worked towards getting the city to revoke the event's alcohol license. They succeeded, and only about 3,000 people attended, less than a quarter of the attendance at the previous balls. That year, reformers like the Woman's Christian Temperance Union (WCTU) worked towards stopping events like these, claiming that they harmed the families in the Levee.

=== Anti-vice reformers ===
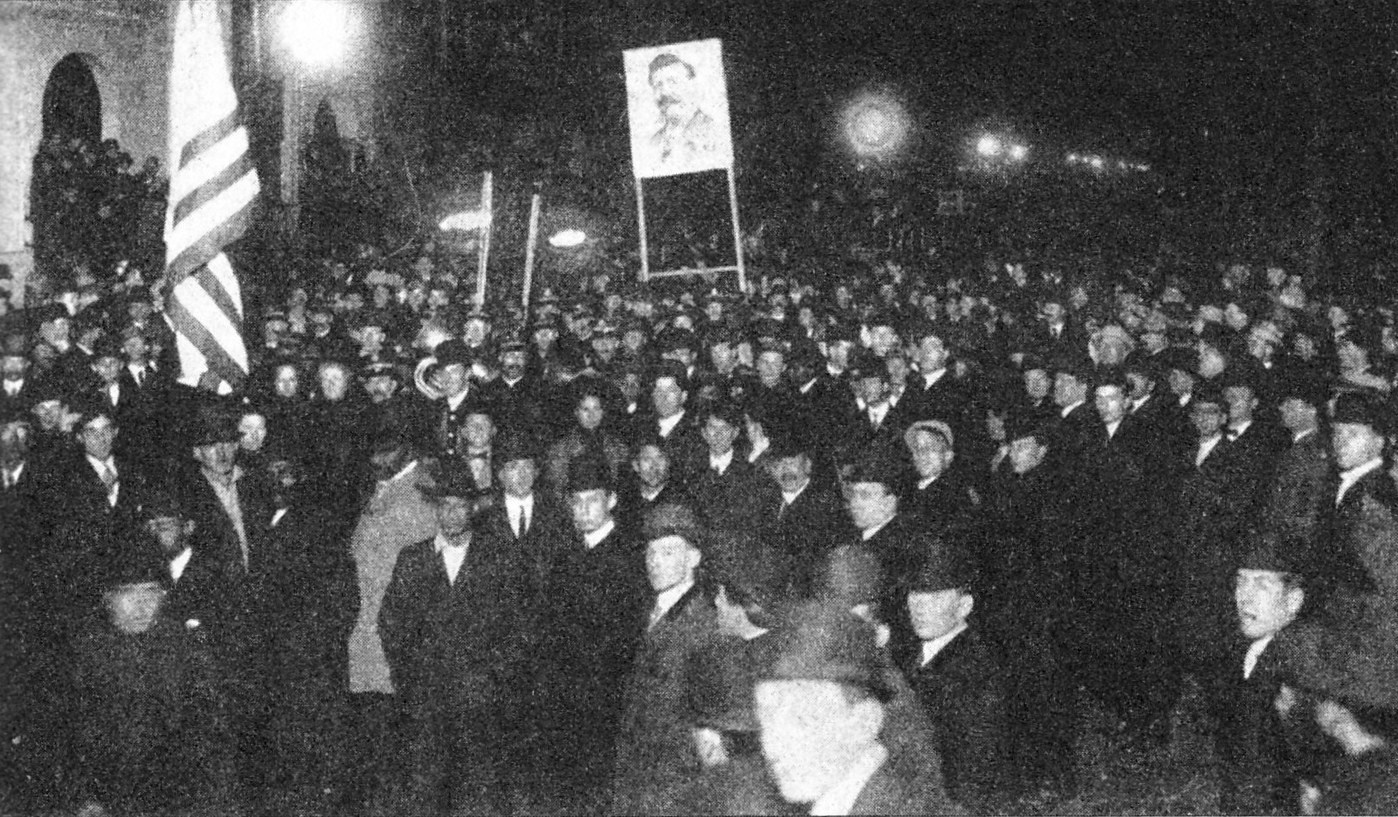
Anti-"white slavery" parade through Chicago's Levee district on October 18, 1909, led by British evangelist Gypsy Smith.

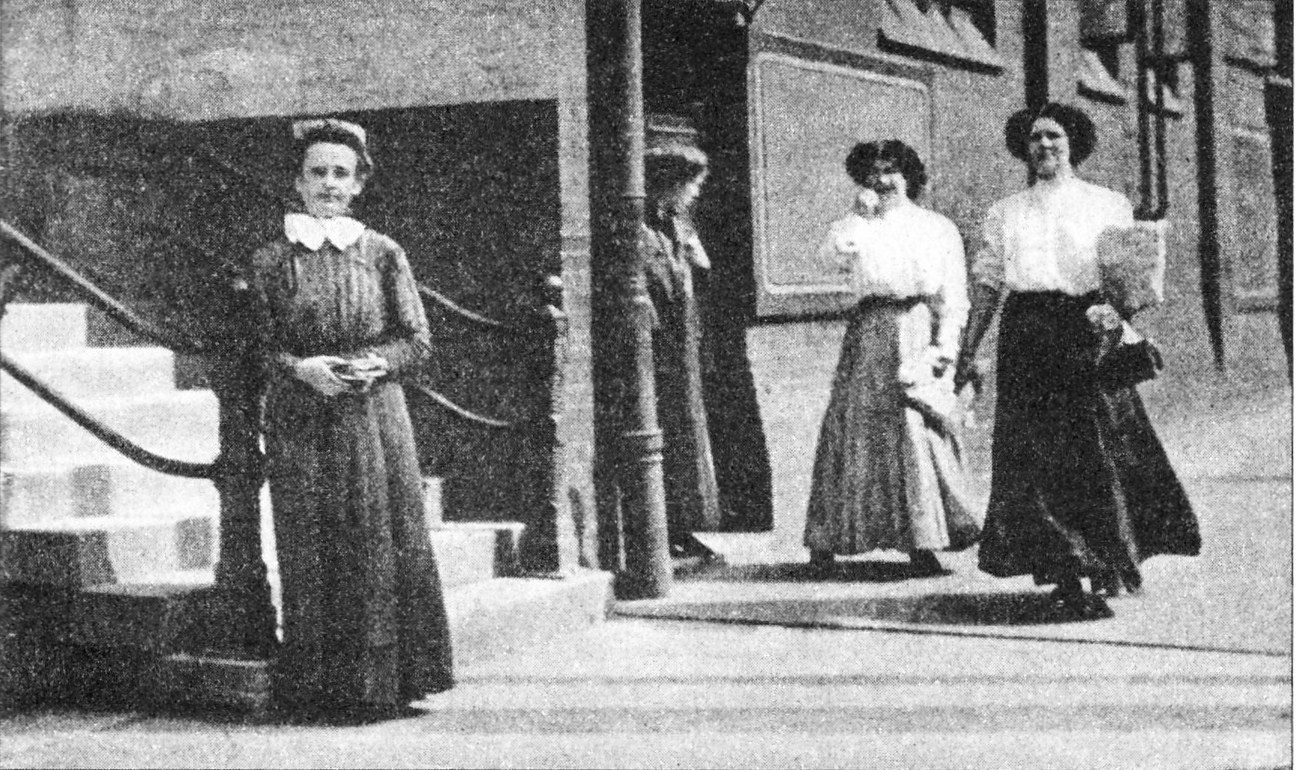
A member of the anti-vice Midnight Mission (left), and Levee district prostitutes walking the street (c.1911).

Devout Christian communities protested at the beginning of the 20th century against prostitution and gambling in the Levee. At its peak, up to 5,000 prostitutes worked in the local brothels. Increasingly, the public became aware of "white slavery" cases in which girls from rural areas fell into the hands of pimps and were systematically forced into prostitution. An especially sensational case was that of Madame Mary Hastings, who inflicted torture and forced prostitution on minor girls in her brothel Custom House Place on Jackson Street.

The Levee District's success in vice came to an end when reformers such as the WCTU and Chicago Vice Commission (CVC) (established by Carter Harrison IV) publicly exposed the issues of white slavery and alcohol abuse. The WCTU had a "department of rescue" to save women forced into slavery. They also had a "department of social purity", which upheld sexual consent laws. The WCTU paid investigators to conduct studies on forced prostitution in Midwest lumber camps. This in turn helped them publish a journal on the stories of women working as prostitutes in Chicago (Levee District), San Francisco, and New York.

The CVC focused on terminating vice districts and on investigating the conditions for women in the Levee. The members spoke to prostitutes, police, and neighborhood organizations. They published the report The Social Evil in Chicago, which included prostitution statistics and recommendations for improvement. The report concluded that about 5,000 professional prostitutes worked in Chicago, and about five million men were receiving services from them, for which the women received about $25 weekly. They were mostly uneducated and unskilled, and they had little to no opportunities for economic advancement. The report was read around the world and influenced vice commissions in 43 cities to close their own vice districts.

=== Closure of The Levee ===
The difficult process of closing down the entire Levee District began on January 9, 1910, when Nathaniel Ford Moore died in Victoria "Vic" Shaw's brothel. She wanted to frame Minna Everleigh for the death, but Everleigh found out about the plot before Shaw got the chance. Shaw was forced to call the police to report the death after which her brothel was closed. A year later, on October 3, 1911, the state's attorney issued warrants for 135 people associated with the Levee, including Big Jim Colosimo, Ed Weiss, Roy Jones and Vic Shaw. The warrants shut down halls, saloons and brothels. Many people were arrested within the brothels; in Marie Blanchey's brothel, 20 women and 30 men were arrested. Word spread about corruption in the government, and on October 24, 1911, Mayor Carter Harrison ordered the closure of the Everleigh Club. It was shut down the following day. Many businesses in the Levee District closed in 1911, but the district held on for two more years. One of the last brothels to close was Freiberg's Dance Hall, which celebrated its last night on August 24, 1914.

== Timeline ==
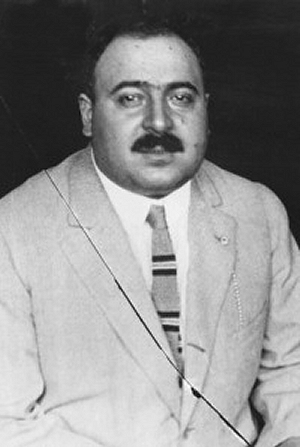
James "Big Jim" Colosimo

- Mid-19th century – Chicago has more arcades than New Orleans and Pittsburgh combined. The metropolis, whose brothels and arcades are larger and more revealing than elsewhere, was once considered the "craziest city in the US".
- 1871 – The Great Chicago Fire. Many saloons and brothels are destroyed. The Levee District's predecessor, the Customs House District, built between Harrison Street, Polk Street and Dearborn Station.
- 1893 – The brothels and gambling saloons of the Levee attracted a crowd of visitors from the World's Columbian Exposition.
- 1895 – Jim Colosimo moves to the Levee District, which already includes 2,000 brothels, saloons and gambling salons.
- 1897 – Prohibition of street prostitution in a designated zone.
- February 1, 1900 – The luxury Everleigh Club opens its doors.
- May 15, 1900 – The Chicago Vice Commission seeks to close brothels for the first time.
- 1903–1909 – Van Beven and Colosimo engage in trafficking of young prostitutes who are scheduled to so-called "cadets" (pimps) on a five-year rotation between brothels. From there, the girls descend to working at hour hotels and then street prostitution. Colosimo and Van Beven lead a "White Slave Ring", where their victims are often young girls from rural areas, lured to Chicago by the promise of marriage. They were then raped ("broken in") by the cadets. The girls suffered a martyrdom of drug abuse, beatings and rape. Only a few manage to free themselves from it. Many die prematurely from alcohol and drug abuse, as well as venereal diseases. Van Beven's and Colosimo's system gives the cadets a continuous supply of "fresh meat". Colosimo and Van Beven stretch their thriving businesses nationwide to New York, St. Louis and Milwaukee.
- 1905 – Colosimo opens his first saloons and single-hour hotels.

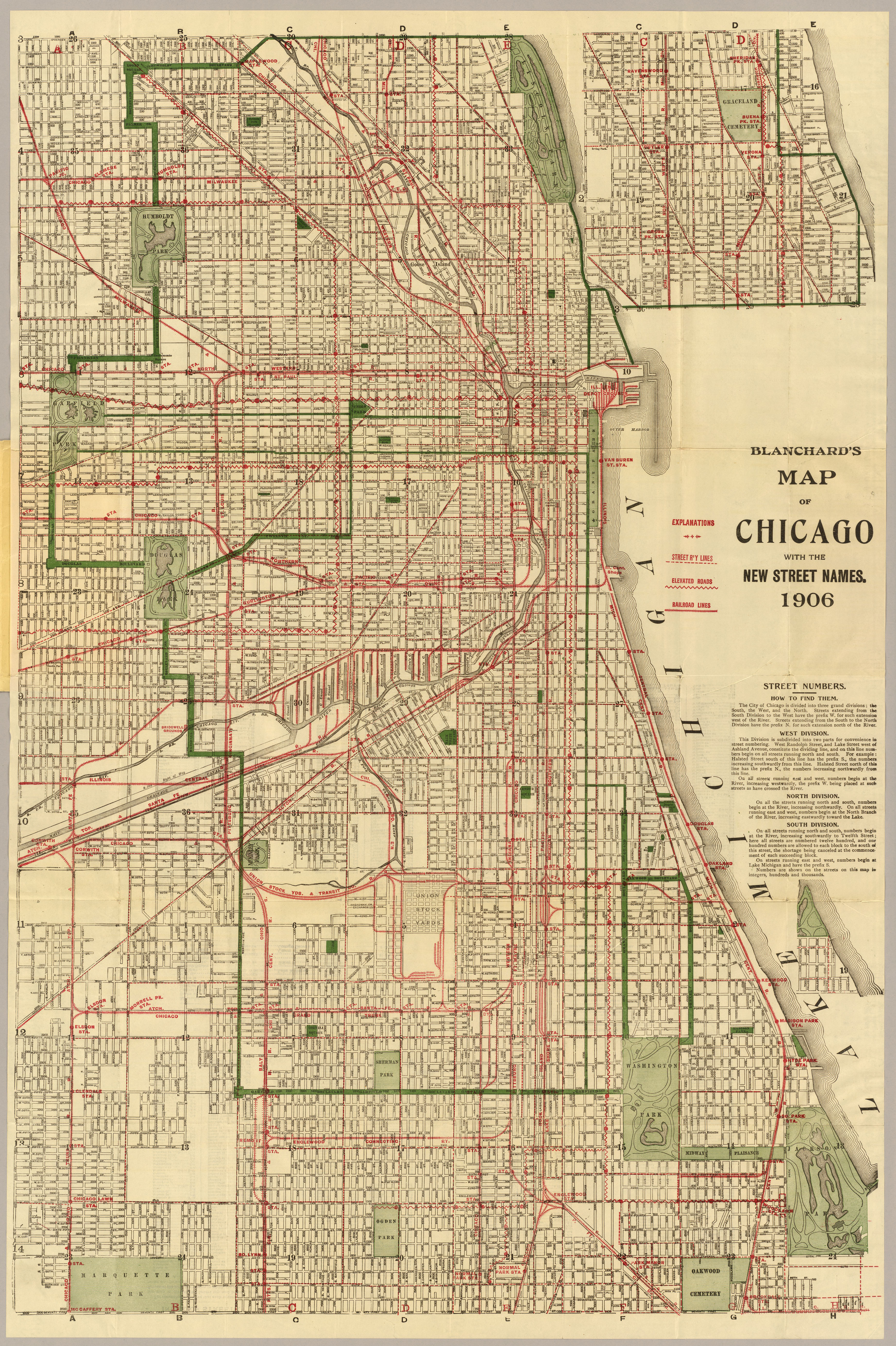
1906 Blanchard's map of Chicago

- October 18, 1909 – Rodney "Gipsy" Smith leads a march of 200 Christians through the Levee District.
- January 9, 1910 – Nathaniel Ford Moore (born January 31, 1884), a well-known American golfer and son of the President of the Rock Island Railway Company, dies in the brothel of Vic Shaw of a narcotic overdose. In an attempt to cover this up, Shaw accuses her rivals, the owners of the Everleigh Club. The death causes a social scandal.
- 1910 – Colosimo opens the cabaret "Colosimos Café" in the heart of the Levee at 2126 South Wabash. The well-kept restaurant with a sophisticated ambience plays both jazz and Italian opera arias. It quickly becomes the center of Chicago's nightlife, attracting politicians, artists and actors.
- 1910 – The estimated gross proceeds from prostitution are $60 million and the net gain is $15 million. In the same year, brothel owners found the protective association "Friendly Girlfriends".
- 1910 – Passing of the Mann Act against the "White Slavery". The wording prohibits the "transport of a woman across national borders for immoral purposes"
- October 25, 1911 – The Everleigh Club closes.
- December 10, 1911 – Inspector P.D. O'Brien implements measures against alcohol consumption and music performance, also banning unaccompanied women remaining in bars.
- October 3, 1911 – Charges are brought against a total of 135 people associated with the Levee. These include "Big Jim" Colosimo, Ed Weiss, Roy Jones and Vic Shaw.
- 1912 – Due to public pressure, prostitution in the Levee is targeted. The City of Chicago's "Moral Division" embarks on a mass arrest of prostitutes, pimps, drug dealers, contract killers, bar owners and gamblers.
- October 22, 1913 – The Mayor of Chicago obtains the closure of Ed Weiss's Capitol.
- July 18, 1914 – The closure of brothels in the Levee causes violence, during which a police officer dies.
- August 24, 1914 – Closure of Freiberg's Dance Hall as one of the Levee's last long-standing clubs.
- 1920s – Under the influence of Kenna and Coughlin, gambling in the Levee continues to grow. The Chicago Outfit increasingly shifts prostitution to other districts like Cicero or the suburbs.

== Associated notable persons ==
- Vina Fields was a black madam and brothel owner in the Levee district for thirty years. At the height of her success, she employed sixty prostitutes and gave daily meals to those unemployed from the Panic of 1893.

Caricature of "Lords of the Levee" – "Bathhouse John" Coughlin and "Hinky Dink" Kenna

- Michael "Hinky Dink" Kenna was the alderman of the First Ward who owned a saloon on Clark street called the Workingman's Exchange. Here he would bribe people to vote for him by offering a free lunch and mug of beer for a nickel.
- "Bathhouse" John Coughlin ran the First Ward with Hinky Dink and owned a tavern on West Madison named, "Silver Dollar Saloon." Many people called him "Bathhouse" John.

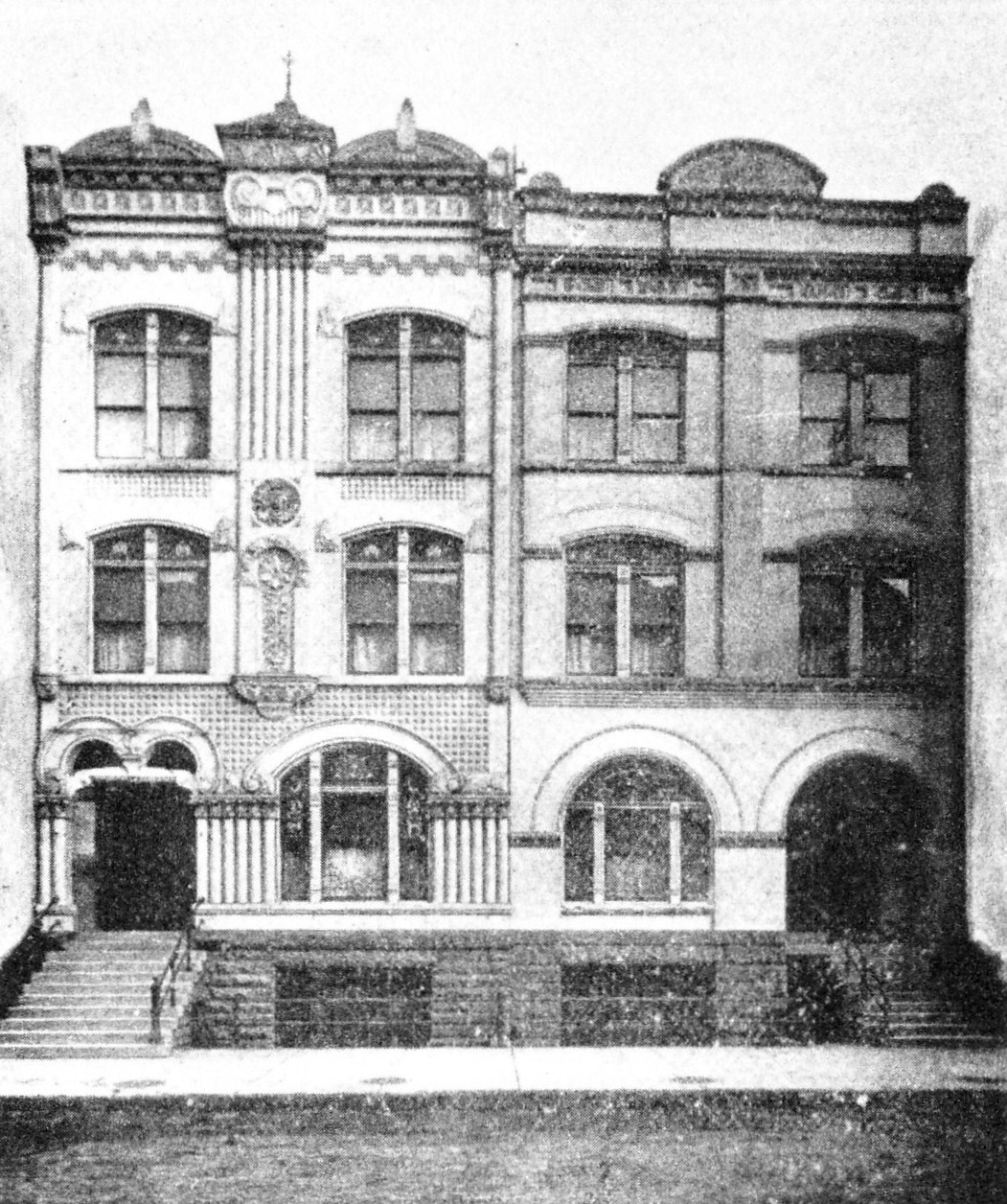
The Everleigh Club at 2131–2133 South Dearborn Street.

- Ada Everleigh was the owner and madam of the Everleigh Club with her younger sister Minna. Ada played the role as the executive who balanced the books. She also made it her priority to keep the club clean and spent half of her time wiping the mirrors, straightening oil paintings, and checking the Gold Piano for marks (the Gold Room was her favorite room). The Everleigh Club was the best brothel in the Levee and girls considered it to be a superior position to get picked into staying there.
- Minna Everleigh was the owner and madam of the Everleigh Club with her sister Ada Everleigh. She was the mingler, the one who did all the talking for the club. She was almost framed for the murder of two different men, Marshall Field Jr. first and Nathaniel Ford Moore five years later by Vic Shaw, who also convinced Pony Moore (who had no relation to Nathaniel) to go in on it the first time by bribing him $40,000.
- Ike Bloom. His real name was Isaac Gitelson and he made arrangements for protection payments with the police for the Levee District. He also operated a dance hall, the Freidberg, which he said was a dance academy to keep reformers from finding out the truth. This dance hall had a bar in the front with a long dance room in the back and an orchestra on the balcony. His rules for the girls in his hall were: she must report in by nine p.m. every night, persuade men to spend at least 40 cents every time they bought a round and to lure guys to the Marlborough Hotel.
- Jim Colosimo, aka "Big Jim", ran a white slavery ring where he had girls depend on him for praise and protection. Girls would be lured to Chicago by being promised good jobs and nice homes, only to be sold to other brothel owners. He loved diamonds and was always playing with them in his hands; he would buy them from thieves or win them by gambling. In 1920 he was shot in his café and died.
- Victoria Colosimo was married to Jim Colosimo and helped him run pool halls and saloons. She operated two of the dives, the Victoria and the Saratoga.

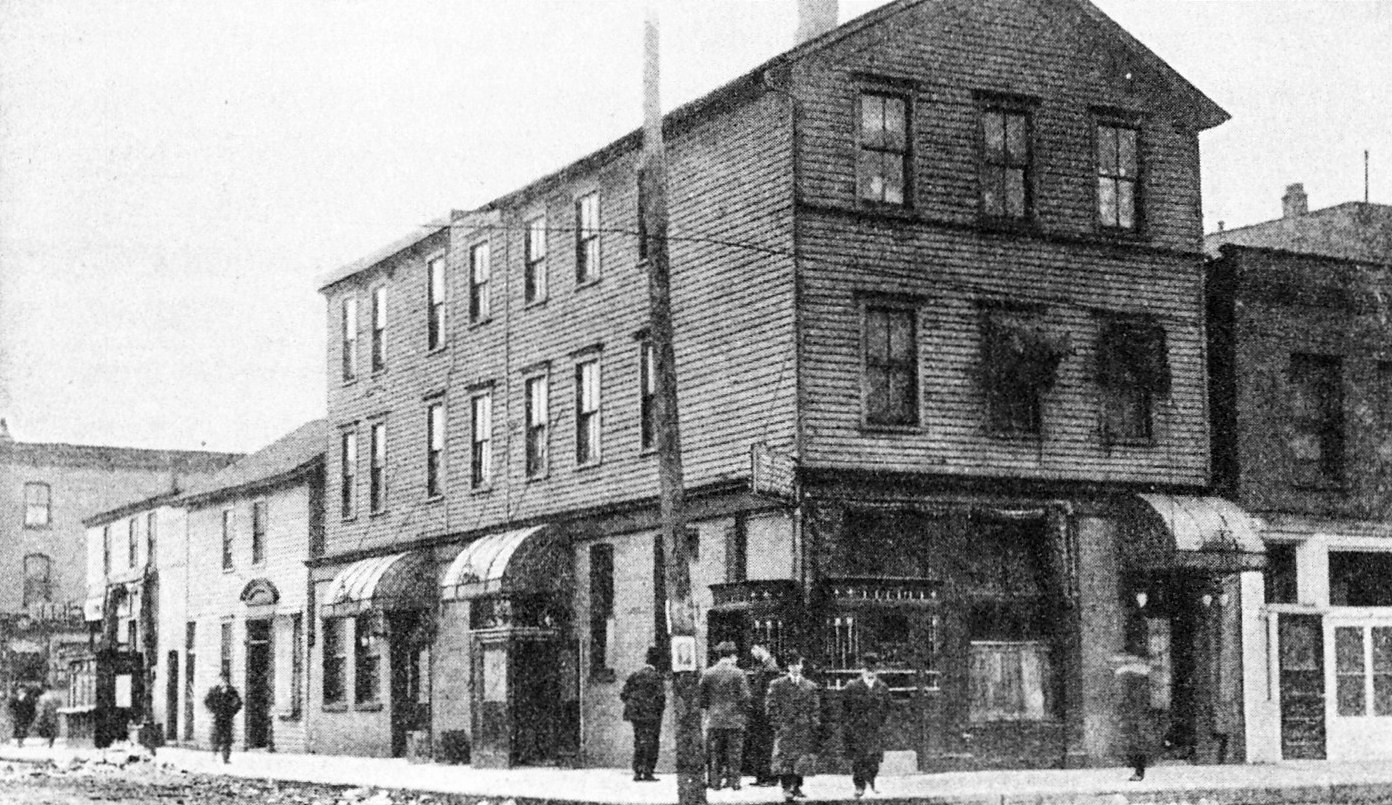
Brothel "The Paris", 2101 Armor Street. The establishment was run by Maurice Van Bever, who was accused of "white slavery"

- Maurice Van Bever, Big Jim's partner, who operated two saloons called the Paris and the White City. The trafficking ("interstate ring" between several states), which he operated together with his wife Julia, confirmed by statements of the minor Loretta Campbell, who was abducted from St. Louis and was picked up in a raid in the "White City". Van Bever drove hundreds of prostitutes into the homes of Colosimos and was arrested in 1909.
- Ed Weiss, brothel owner next to the Everleigh Club who would pay off the Levee cabdrivers to drive drunken men to his door instead of the Everleigh Club.
- Vic Shaw, born Emma Elizabeth Fitzgerald. A madam to a house on South Dearborn Street who hated and felt threatened by the Everleigh sisters. Her girls were not treated very well. They were harshly disciplined and not always given proper examinations by doctors.
- Pony Moore was the owner of two levee dives called the Turf Exchange Saloon and the Hotel De Moore resort.
- John "Mushmouth" Johnson was the first African American vice lord who opened a saloon and gambling house on State Street.

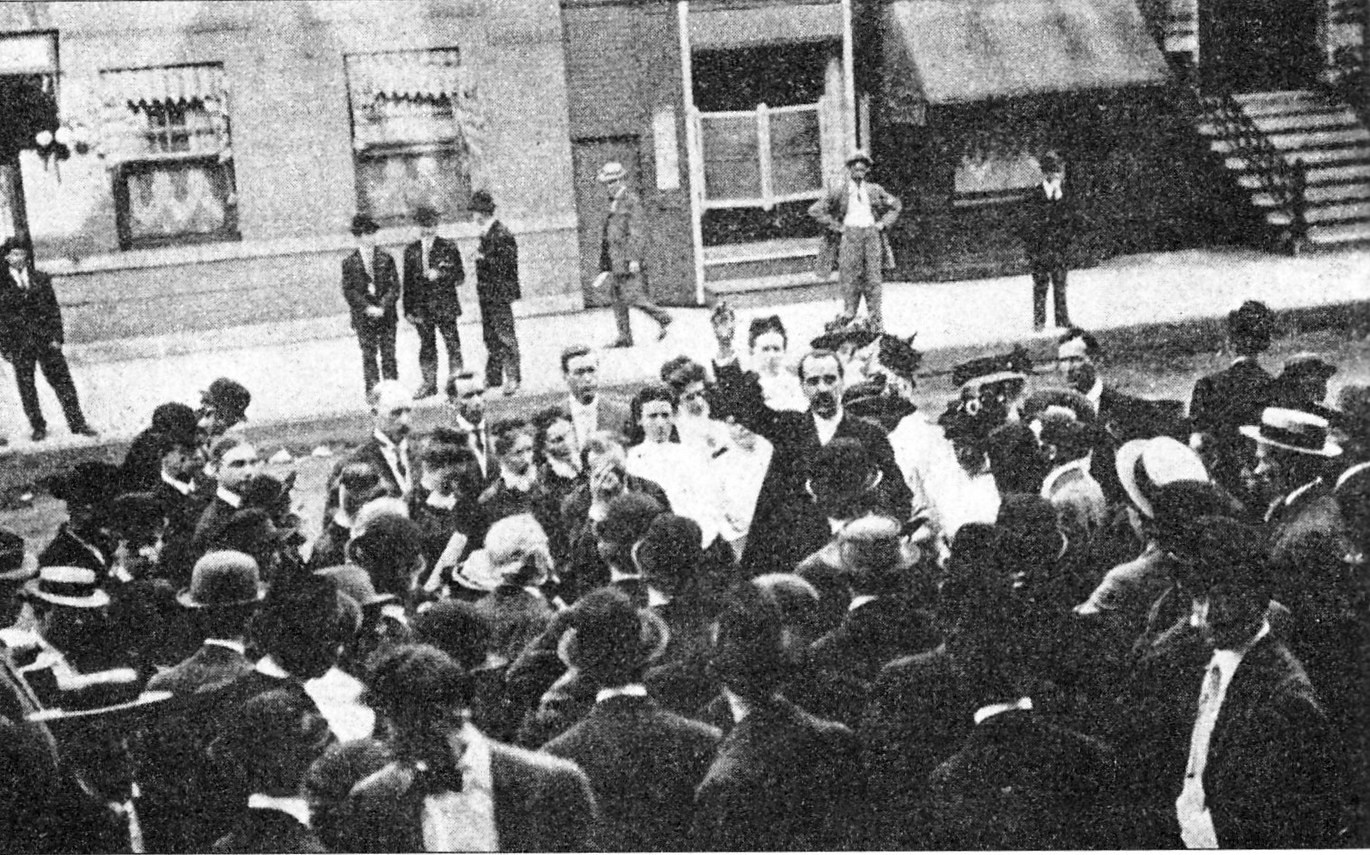
Minister and anti-vice crusader Ernest A. Bell preaching on the street in Levee district

- Reverend Ernest Albert Bell, a preacher who would walk around the Levee streets every night besides Monday to protest the Custom House Place and tried to get the mayor to close it.
- George Little owned a saloon called Here It Is and ran a combination bar and brothel called the Imperial on Armour Avenue, right next to one of Van Bever's dives. He was also considered to the Levee Czar meaning he was sent personally by Hinky Dink and Big Jim to collect protection payments.
- Roy Jones, Vic Shaw's husband who operated a casino on State Street.
- Belle Schrieber, a working girl in the Everleigh Club, who was kicked out for sneaking around with a boxer named Jack Johnson.
- Lillian St. Clair, also kicked out of the Everleigh Club for the Jack Johnson incident.
- Bessie Wallace, also kicked out of the Everleigh Club for the Jack Johnson incident.
- Virginia Bond, also kicked out of the Everleigh Club for the Jack Johnson incident.
- Monsieur Emond, a French dressmaker at the Everleigh Club, who had told a man investigating Marshall Field Jr's death the name of two girls in the club, going by the names of Camille and Hughs, who had played a role in his murder.
- Panzy Williams, Madam of a brothel, who was convicted for refusing to surrender one of her girls to her parents, who had asked for their daughter back in 1907.
- Mary Hastings (born c.1860 in Brussels): infamous brothel owner and human trafficker who came to Chicago in 1888 after already gaining experience in her hometown of Brussels, Paris, Toronto, Denver, Portland and San Francisco. She was one of the first women to systematically operate "White Slavery" in around 1890. Using bribes, (about $2.00 per week to the local patrol) or services of the girls to officials, she escaped police investigation for many years. Her houses were considered the worst brothels in the city, in which any kind of perverted wishes were fulfilled. She was credited with saying, "If a girl was good enough to be accepted at an ordinary brothel, then she was too good for her own". From about 1893, she attracted young girls from rural areas of the Midwest of 13 to 17 years of age on the pretext of earning good money in Chicago. In one of her notorious houses, they took their clothes off and were abused by six "professional" rapists. This was the process called, in the jargon of the trade, "The Life", which included a continuing ordeal of abuse, rape and inhumane treatment. Following the "breaking-in", the victims were either smuggled into homes (including Customs House Place on Jackson Street) or resold to other brothel operators for approximately $50 to $300, depending on their age and appeal. The inhumane working hours usually went from noon to five in the morning. During this time the girls often consumed schnapps and absinthe to get through. British journalist William Stead once visited one of Hastings' brothels and described the conditions in his socially critical article "If Christ came to Chicago." Legend has it that some of the girls managed to smuggle out a note reading "I am being held as a slave" to alert the police to this crime. In 1895, after nine girls escaped from the brothel under daring conditions, the criminal machinations of Mary Hastings were blown open. The police were forced to act and Hastings fled to Toronto, Canada, never returning to Chicago. In Canada, she operated under the name Madame Gain.

== Prostitution in Chicago after the Levee District ==
Although the Levee District had closed down in 1912, prostitution continued to be a problem in Chicago. The closing of the Levee had initiated changes throughout the city's sexual commerce. There were no brothels, but that didn't stop many men and women. They moved from brothels and saloons to cabarets, nightclubs and other nighttime scenes. Solicitation was still available, and the sex entrepreneurs were still willing to pay law enforcement to keep quiet.

The election of Chicago Mayor William "Big Bill" Hale Thompson in 1915 reactivated the illegal business in the Levee. Many of the brothels were reopened as hotels, saloons or cabarets. "Big Jim" Colosimo and his wife Victoria Moresco took over three brothels and control of the district. His Colosimo's Café, frequented by famous guests such as Enrico Caruso, became the center of high society in Chicago. Due to his Italian origins, Colosimo became the target of Sicilian blackmail bands like the Black Hand Gang (La Mano Nera), which increasingly threatened him. For fear of kidnapping, he sought shelter with his co-relatives Johnny Torrio in New York City. Torrio, a cousin of Victoria Moresco, sent Al Capone to rectify the situation there. Capone began his career at a restaurant in this district called The Four Deuces (2222 South Wabash). The four-storey brick building, which also housed an office and a brothel upstairs, was initially owned by Jonny Torrio. It is believed that he tortured his rivals in the basement of the "Four Deuces".

In the beginning of the 1920s, vice syndicates of the time moved to the suburbs where law enforcement was easier to persuade. Although laws were established to control or eliminate prostitution, they were not backed up by the court system. "In many cases, the defendant did not appear in trial in which case the charges were dropped and the bond seized." It was shown that even when they were sentenced, none of the prostitutes were sentenced correctly. Only 15 of the 320 cases were found guilty in a group of cases they had selected. In the final decades of the 20th century, establishments similar to brothels reentered the city. New businesses like peepshows, massage parlors, and bars featuring live showgirls opened. In the 1980s, however, most were shut down and turned into condominiums, restaurants, and high-end retail stores.

== Bibliography ==
- Abbott, Karen (2007). Sin in the Second City: Madams, Ministers, Playboys, and the Battle for America's Soul. Random House Publishing Group. ISBN 9781588366436. "Freiberg."
- Asbury, Herbert (1986). Gem of the Prairie: An Informal History of the Chicago Underworld. Northern Illinois University Press. ISBN 9780875805344.
- Asbury, Herbert (2003). The Gangs of Chicago. Arrow Books. ISBN 9780099464761.
- Blair, Cynthia M. (2010). I've Got to Make My Livin': Black Women's Sex Work in Turn-of-the-Century Chicago. University of Chicago Press. ISBN 9780226056005.
- Chandler, Gael (2014). Chronicles of Old San Francisco: Exploring the Historic City by the Bay. Museyon Inc. ISBN 9780984633494.
- Kobler, John (1992). Capone: The Life and World of Al Capone. Da Capo Press. ISBN 9780306804991.
- Donovan, Brian (2010). White Slave Crusades: Race, Gender, and Anti-vice Activism, 1887–1917. University of Illinois Press. ISBN 9780252091001.
- Eig, Jonathan (2014). Get Capone: The Secret Plot That Captured America's Most Wanted Gangster. Tantor Audio. ISBN 9781400195312.
- Kubal, Timothy (July 5, 2007). "White Slave Crusades: Race, Gender, and Anti-Vice Activism, 1887–1917 (review)". Journal of Social History. 40 (4): 1057–1059. doi:10.1353/jsh.2007.0102. ISSN 1527-1897. S2CID 142660708.
- Lombardo, Robert M. (2012). Organized Crime in Chicago: Beyond the Mafia. University of Illinois Press. ISBN 9780252094484.
- Schneider, Stephen (2016). Iced: The Story of Organized Crime in Canada. HarperCollins. ISBN 9781443429900.
- Schoenberg, Robert (1993). Mr. Capone. HarperCollins. ISBN 9780688128388.
- Taylor, Troy (2009). Murder and Mayhem in Chicago's Vice Districts. Arcadia Publishing. ISBN 9781625841117.
