= Ike Bloom =

American businessman, cabaret and nightclub owner

- Born: c. 1865
- Died: December 15, 1930 (aged 65); Chicago, Illinois, United States
- Occupations: Club owner, bootlegger, white slaver

Ike Bloom (c. 1865 – December 15, 1930) was an American businessman, cabaret and nightclub owner in Chicago from the turn of the 20th century and throughout Prohibition. An early organized crime figure in Chicago, he was an associate of "Big Jim" Colosimo and owner of some of the city's most popular nightclubs such as Midnight Frolics and Freiberg's, a well known dance hall in The Levee vice district at 20 E 22nd St. The Midnight Frolics was the club in which comedian Joe E. Lewis began his career in 1926.

== Biography ==
Born Isaac Gitelson Bloom, he ran numerous social clubs after opening the popular Frieburg's Dance Hall in 1895. Although Freiburg's closed in 1914, it was later reopened during Prohibition and renamed Midnight Frolics among other speakeasies during Prohibition. Known as "King of the Brothels", he was involved in white slavery as well as prostitution as a partner with Colosimo and others in the Everleigh Club following its grand opening in 1911.

He and his brother-in-law Sol Friedman were ensured a monopoly on the sale of bulk whiskey in the Levee by Aldermen "Bathhouse" John Coughlin and Mike "Hinky Dink" Kenna in exchange for making collections for the two Aldermen.

In 1920, licences for the restaurants were temporarily revoked during the fall elections by Mayor Thompson when it was discovered the two were supporting the Democratic nominee for the office of State's Attorney. Bloom refused to abide by the one o'clock closing time and was arrested, later bringing an injunction against the city. Attorneys for Bloom and Colosimo successfully appealed the Mayor's decision.

Bloom gave the eulogy at Colosimo's funeral, which was attended by more than 5,000 people. He would later become involved with John Torrio and Al Capone, with Capone later owning 25% of the Midnight Frolics.

His club, the Deauville Cafe, was held up by two gunmen who escaped with over $2,000 and a diamond ring worth $1,000 on the afternoon of January 30, 1926. Although few were present during the robbery, Samuel Cole (then owner of the Southern and Astor Hotels) was one of the robbery victims.

Active in local politics, he eventually became head of the First Ward Democratic Organization before his death on December 15, 1930, following a two-year illness.
