= Colosimo =

Colosimo is an Italian surname. Notable people with the surname include:

- Big Jim Colosimo (1878–1920), Italian organized crime figure
- Gaspare Colosimo (1859–1940), Italian jurist and politician
- Simon Colosimo (born 1979), Australian soccer player
- Vince Colosimo (born 1966), Australian actor

== See also ==
- Colosimi
