= Everleigh Club =

Brothel which operated in Chicago

Coordinates: 41°51′17.7″N 87°37′43″W

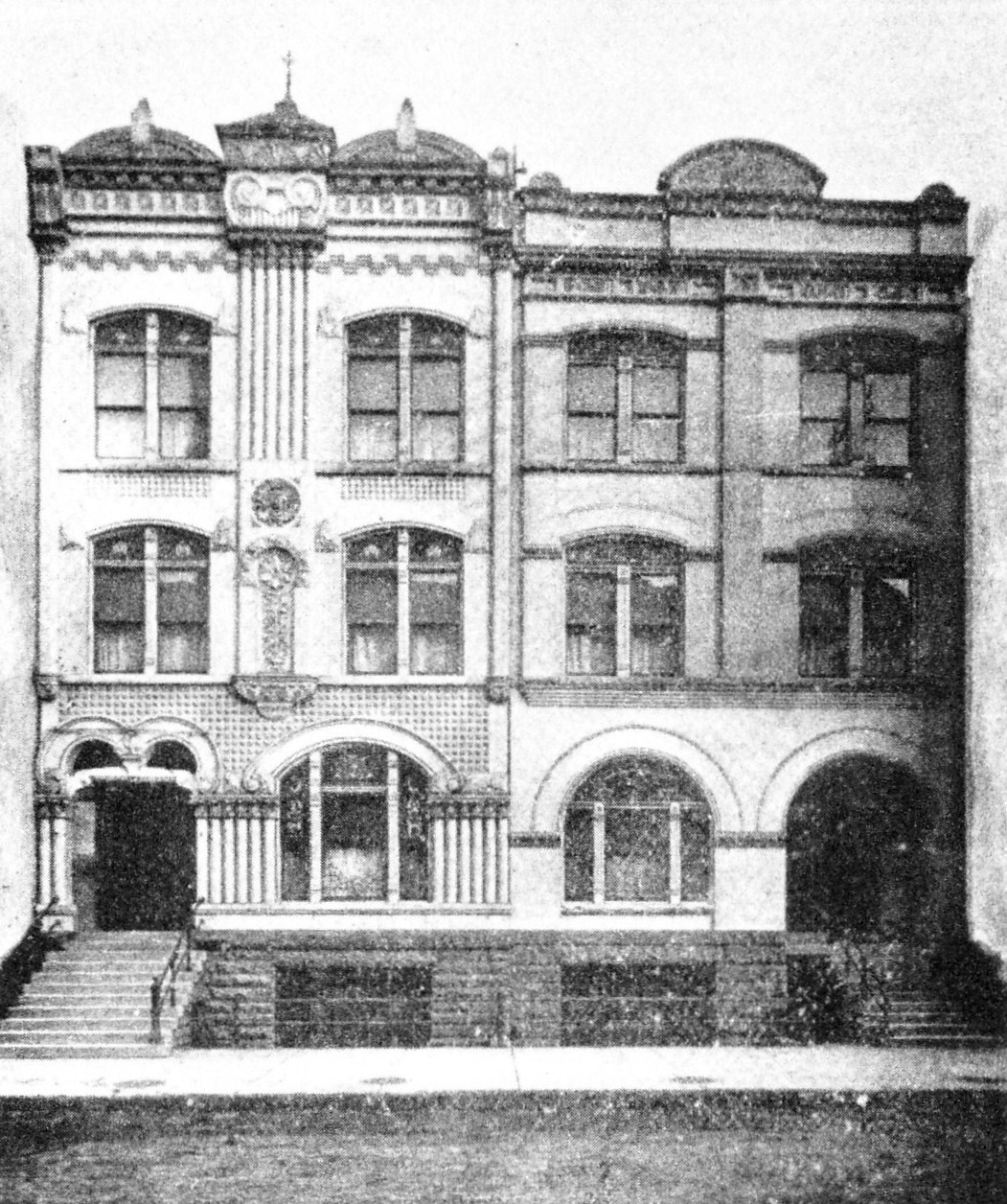
The Everleigh Club at 2131–2133 South Dearborn Street, Chicago. Minna Everleigh's 1911 book, The Everleigh Club, Illustrated, advertised the brothel with photographs of the luxurious building and its lushly decorated interiors

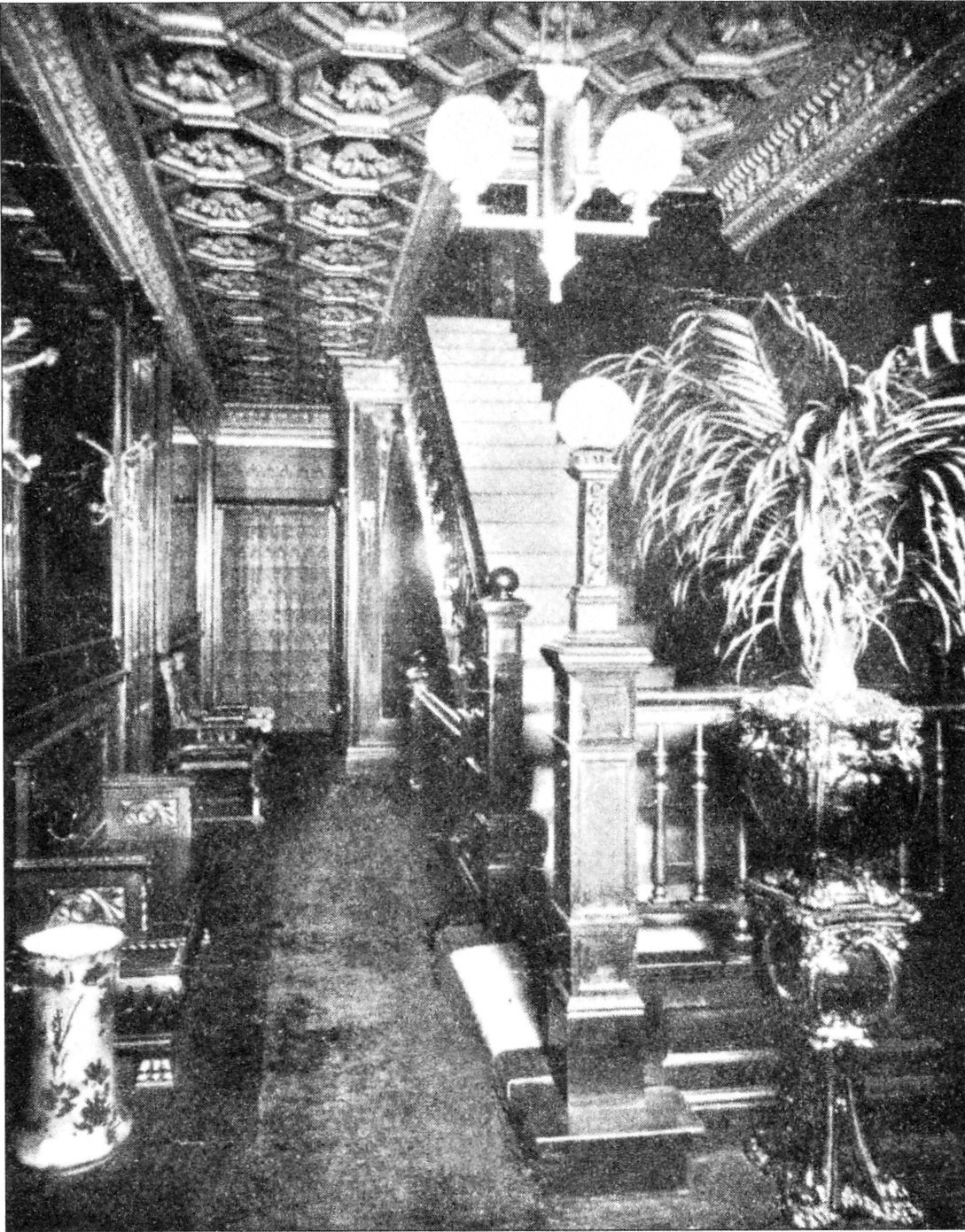
Hallway to entrance at 2133 South Dearborn

The Everleigh Club was a upscale brothel which operated in Chicago, Illinois, from February 1900 until October 1911. It was owned and operated by Ada and Minna Everleigh.

== History ==
Ada Everleigh, the elder, was born in Greene County, Virginia, on February 15, 1864, and died in Charlottesville, Virginia, on January 5, 1960. Minna was born in Greene County on July 13, 1866 and died in New York City on September 16, 1948.

Initially born with the surname Simms, the sisters took the name Everleigh, which was inspired by their grandmother's tradition to sign her letters, "Everly yours." According to the sisters, after two unsuccessful marriages (of which there is no record), the Everleigh sisters left the small town where they were raised in Kentucky (another story concocted by the sisters) for Omaha, Nebraska. It was there where Minna and Ada established their first brothel using money they invested from their $35,000 estate inheritance. In only two years, the women doubled their investment in addition to earning a considerable profit. Minna and Ada closed the brothel, and with their recent earnings, sought more lucrative investment opportunities.

Before relocating to Chicago, the Everleigh sisters toured brothels in many cities, trying to find a location which had "plenty of wealthy men but no superior houses." They were directed to Chicago by Cleo Maitland, a madam in Washington, D.C., who suggested they contact Effie Hankins in Chicago. After buying Hankins's brothel at 2131–2133 South Dearborn Street, they

fired all the women and completely redecorated the entire building with the most luxurious appointments available. Silk curtains, damask easy chairs, oriental rugs, mahogany tables, gold rimmed china and silver dinner ware, perfumed fountains in every room, a $15,000 gold-leafed piano for the Music Room, mirrored ceilings, a library filled with finely bound volumes, an art gallery featuring nudes in gold frames—no expense was spared. While the heavyweight boxer Jack Johnson thought the $57 gold spittoons in his café were worth boasting about, the patrons of the Everleigh Club were obliged to expectorate in $650 gold cuspidors.

The Everleigh Club was described by Chicago's Vice Commission as "probably the most famous and luxurious house of prostitution in the country".

Before the opening of the Everleigh Club, Ada was responsible for recruiting staff for the club. She started by contacting her former employees in Omaha and spreading the word through brothels across the country. She conducted face-to-face interviews with all the applicants. The brothel opened on February 1, 1900, with little fanfare, and turned away many of the clients who initially appeared because the Everleigh Sisters did not deem them to be the suitably upscale clientele they were seeking.

=== The sisters' separate responsibilities ===
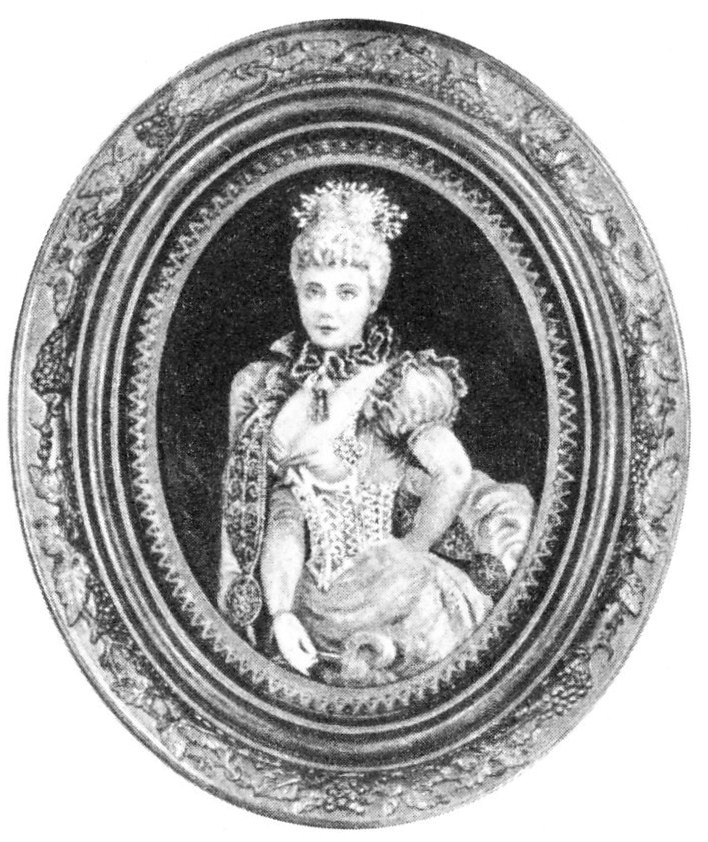
Ada Everleigh in 1895

The Everleigh sisters Minna and Ada—the madams of the Everleigh Club— carried out very different duties in the operation of the club. Ada, the quieter and more reserved sister, took on the responsibility of making sure the club was kept up to standard. She mainly focused on the business transactions, which included managing the books and allocating finances. She also took care of the logistics of running the club, including overseeing cleaning and renovations, and was responsible for hiring new girls.

Minna, the outgoing sister, was responsible for teaching new girls charm and culture, as well as any duties that required personal interaction. Her personality lent her the ability to effortlessly interact with guests. Often Minna was seen socializing with guests near the parlors or welcoming them with a friendly greeting into the club.

After the club was closed, Minna claimed in testimony that she "always entertained state legislators free in the club."

== Interior layout ==
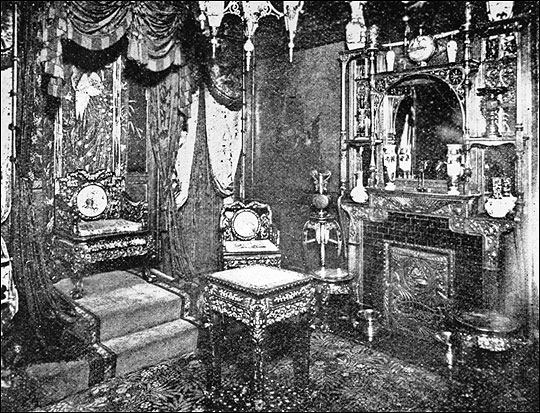
The Japanese Throne Room at the Everleigh Club

The Everleigh quickly gained a reputation as an upscale gentlemen's club, so much so that the Everleigh sisters were forced to turn away prospective clients even on opening day on February 1, 1900. The club's extensive popularity afforded Minna and Ada the opportunity to select their clientele. Only those men deemed suitable by Minna and Ada gained admittance into the Everleigh Club. The Everleigh sisters deemed a prospective client "worthy" to be admitted into the club if: the prospective client provided a letter of recommendation from an existing member, an engraved card, or through a formal introduction by Minna or Ada. These standards made the club extremely exclusive, indulging the desires of only the wealthy and influential men. Author Karen Abbott wrote, "The cachet of being able to go there, just because they turned down so many people. It became an exclusive badge of honor just to be admitted."

On March 3, 1902, Prince Henry of Prussia visited the club while in the United States to collect a ship built for his brother, German Kaiser Wilhelm II. Although the city had sponsored numerous events for Henry, his main interest was a visit to the club. The sisters planned a bacchanalia for the visiting prince, including dancing, dining and a recreation of the dismemberment of Zeus's son. During one of the dances, a prostitute's slipper came off and spilled champagne. When one of the prince's entourage drank the champagne, he started the trend of drinking champagne from a woman's shoe.

The club employed 15 to 25 cooks and maids.

== Scandals ==
On November 22, 1905, Marshall Field Jr., son of department store founder Marshall Field, suffered a gunshot to the abdomen; he died of complications several days later. Although newspapers reported it was an accident and occurred at his home, there is some evidence that he was shot by a prostitute at the Everleigh Club. A rival madam maliciously accused the Everleigh sisters of murdering Field.

On January 9, 1910, Nathaniel Moore, a former U.S. Olympic Team golfer, died of natural causes in the Chez Shaw brothel in Chicago's Levee district after spending much of the previous night at the Everleigh Club.

== Closing ==
The Everleigh sisters operated their brothel as a place of luxury, made available only to wealthier and more prominent clients. This made it more difficult when it came time for reform. Other brothels during this time period simply were raided by the police and shut down, but because the Everleigh Club in particular had such a reputation for its high standards and exclusivity, officials were not able to dismantle the club so easily.

The Chicago Vice Commission sought to close the Everleigh Club and the entire red-light district of Chicago in an attempt to rehabilitate prostitutes, curb the spread of venereal disease, and cease the crime and violence that often were associated with prostitution (not necessarily within the Everleigh Club). Because of the Everleigh sisters and their lavish club, prostitution during this time period became a glamorized activity, which made it harder to eradicate. Local politics played a large role in deciding how and when the club would be shut down. The Everleigh sisters were known for their tendency to bribe local aldermen to look the other way when it came to legal matters. Following a 1910 Vice Commission report that noted there were nearly 600 brothels in Chicago, Mayor Carter Harrison Jr. ordered the Everleigh Club to be closed on October 24, 1911. The sisters retired with an estimated $1 million in cash and traveled in Europe, then eventually changed their name back to Lester and settled in New York City. When their brothel business closed, Ada was 45 years old and Minna was 47 years old.

Minna, always the more outspoken of the two, responded philosophically, stating "If the Mayor says we must close, that settles it...I'll close up shop and walk out with a smile on my face." And so they did. She later stated "If it weren't for married men, we couldn't have carried on at all, and if it weren't for cheating married women, we could have made another million."

Shortly after the brothel was closed, Minna Everleigh testified against Chicago aldermen "Bathhouse" John Coughlin and "Hinky Dink" Kenna. Although Everleigh announced she would make her testimony public, threats by "Big Jim" Colosimo to kill Minna and her sister if the testimony were made public kept her silent. Nevertheless, Chief Justice Harry Olson of Chicago's Municipal Court released her testimony that outlined the schedule of graft due to the aldermen in return for allowing operations to continue in the Levee District.

The building that housed the Everleigh Club eventually was razed in July 1933. Today, the Chicago Housing Authority's Hilliard Homes, designed by Bertrand Goldberg, stand on the site.

== In popular fiction ==
The novel The Golden Room by Irving Wallace (1989) gives a fictionalized account of the events surrounding the visit of Prince Henry of Prussia to the Everleigh Club, taking great liberties with dates and historical characters.

The fictional novel “The Race - An Issac Bell Adventure“ by [Clive Cussler & Justin Scott](2011) includes a reference in Chapter 26 to the Everleigh Club.

== See also ==
- Dumas Brothel
