= Vina Fields =

African American brothel madam

Vina Fields was an African American brothel madam who operated in Chicago from the 1870s to the 1910s. Her career began during the 1870s, when she established her brothel, House of Pleasure, in the Levee District of Chicago. In 1893, at the height of her 30-year career, she owned the largest brothel in Chicago, housing and managing 60-70 women. This made her one of Chicago's wealthiest African Americans and one of the 50 wealthiest people in all of Chicago.

The sex workers she employed were mostly women of color, while she "admitted only white customers". She was described as a true "character of the red light district". Not much is known about Fields' personal life, but historian Cynthia Blair details her massive impact on the sex industry of Chicago, recognizing her as an influential and important African American woman in Chicago's history.

== Early career ==
By the 1870s, Vina Fields managed a large brothel at 138–140 Custom House Place in Chicago. A former slave, Field began her career as a madam with eight black women and one white servant working for her. This made her the only black madam in Chicago to have a servant, as the norm was that only white madams employed servants. Twenty years later, she was managing 19 women and employing four servants. In addition to racial issues that divided the black and white madams of Chicago, there were issues in the Levee district that all madams faced regardless of the level of racial discrimination. The most pervasive of these issues was rent. Landlords knew how lucrative the business of sex work could be, so they allowed the illegal use of their buildings and charged extremely high rent. For example, in 1898 Fields rented a house for 175 US dollars a month that would have normally rented for about 40 US dollars a month.

The racial discrimination and high rent forced many brothel owners and madams to move further from the hub of the Levee, but Fields stayed in the central region for the vast majority of her career. Her ability to maintain her brothel despite the rent and rampant police busts may have been because she owned property in the Levee, making her one of only five madams in the city to do so. She also leased out this property to other brothel keepers. Her ability to maintain multiple profitable ventures within Chicago's sex industry ultimately contributed to her outstanding long-term success.

== 1893 ==
The Worlds Columbian Exposition, which came to Chicago in 1893, brought many visitors to the region and led to increased business for Fields and her fellow brothel owners. She hit her business prime at this point with 60-70 female workers. At the same time, the Panic of 1893 swept through the nation and hit the Chicago workforce hard, with thousands losing their jobs. So while 1893 brought the sex trade a steady stream of customers from the fair, other workers were devastated. Among the soup kitchens and churches, brothel owners did what they could to help those out of work. It was said that Fields "daily fed a hungry, ragged regiment of the out-of-works".

== The move south ==
1910 marked the emergence of a new Southern Levee district. Fields moved with the transition, leaving her resort on Custom House Place after 25 years. Financial insecurity plagued the sex trade and this new district. Many women, especially black women, were forced out of the industry. In 1900, "of the 95 houses of ill fame counted in the census, only four (4 percent) were run and staffed by black women", demonstrating the increasing vulnerability of black women in the industry. Even Fields, as successful and brilliant as she was, was not exempt from the "spatial, racial, and institutional landscapes of sexual commerce" that became more pervasive in this new space. While in this new district, navigating the new organization of the sex industry, Fields moved houses every few years, sometimes due to the financial burden of renting, but possibly due to other forces. In 1907, the Health Department quarantined Fields' house declaring the outbreak of smallpox. This public declaration was clearly bad for business, and prompted Fields to again move to a new place. This kind of public association could easily have put Fields out of business for good, and this may have been the exact intention of the quarantine.

== Legacy ==
Fields' career ended soon after the push to this new region, and the way she spent the rest of her days is not well documented. What is known about her life and about her time in the sex industry paints her in a genuine and positive light as a giver and a provider. Aside from providing for her neighbors when her community fell on hard times, Fields also used her wealth to support her family. She single-handedly put her daughter through a convent school, sent money back to her sisters living in Missouri, and proudly owned a home in an almost all-white neighborhood south of the Levee.

Fields' work as a madam also provided a space for young black women of Chicago to support their own families and communities. She gave them the opportunity to earn their own money, offering lucrative employment opportunities outside of the hard, low-wage jobs that were available to black women in the more traditional economy. Simultaneously, she offered white people a greatly sought-after service. She navigated the tough racial divisions of her time and curated a unique space for herself to prosper in a world where the intersectionality of her status as a black woman made it that much harder to achieve the level of success she did.
