= Liar, Temptress, Soldier, Spy =

2014 novel by Abbott Kahler

Liar, Temptress, Soldier, Spy: Four Women Undercover in the Civil War
- Author: Abbott Kahler
- Language: English
- Genre: [[Historical non-fiction
- Published: 2014
- Publication place: United States
- Media type: Print (hardcover and paperback)
- ISBN: 978-0-06-209290-8
- OCLC: 878667621

Liar, Temptress, Soldier, Spy: Four Women Undercover in the Civil War is a historical fiction novel by American author Abbott Kahler. The book was published in 2014 by HarperCollins.

== Plot ==
Liar, Temptress, Soldier, Spy follows four women's stories throughout the American Civil War era - Rose O'Neal Greenhow, Belle Boyd, Emma Edmondson, Elizabeth Van Lew. Rose is a D.C. socialite who used her social standing to spy for the confederacy. Rose Belle Boyd freelanced as a spy for the confederacy as well. Rose was known "La Belle Rebelle" and the "Secesh Cleopatra". Emma Edmondson was brought up by a father who wished for a son instead of a daughter. To escape an arranged marriage to an older neighbor, Emma fled and joined the Union Army under an alias as a man - Private Frank Thompson. Elizabeth Van Lew is an unmarried women from a family of good social standing family in Virginia. Elizabeth's family had educated and freed their slaves and when the war broke out she became a spy for the Union and operated an extensive spy ring.

== Reception ==
In August 2015, Liar, Temptress, Soldier, Spy was listed as #2 on The New York Times Best Seller List for Espionage.

In 2023, Liar, Temptress, Soldier, Spy was listed as one of the banned books in the Frisco Independent School District.
