= Drinking from shoes =

Cultural practice of drinking from shoes

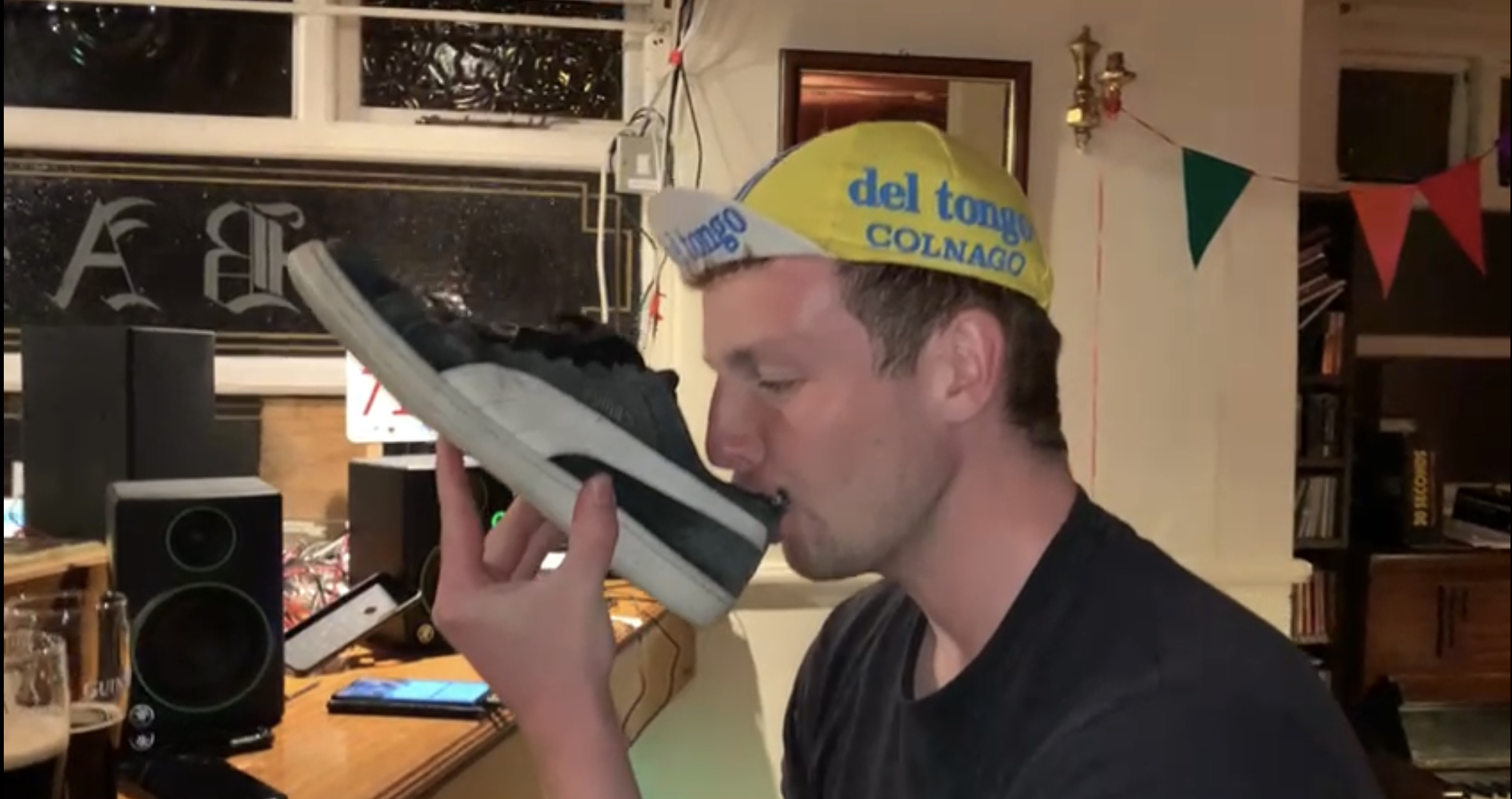
Man drinking from shoe in pub

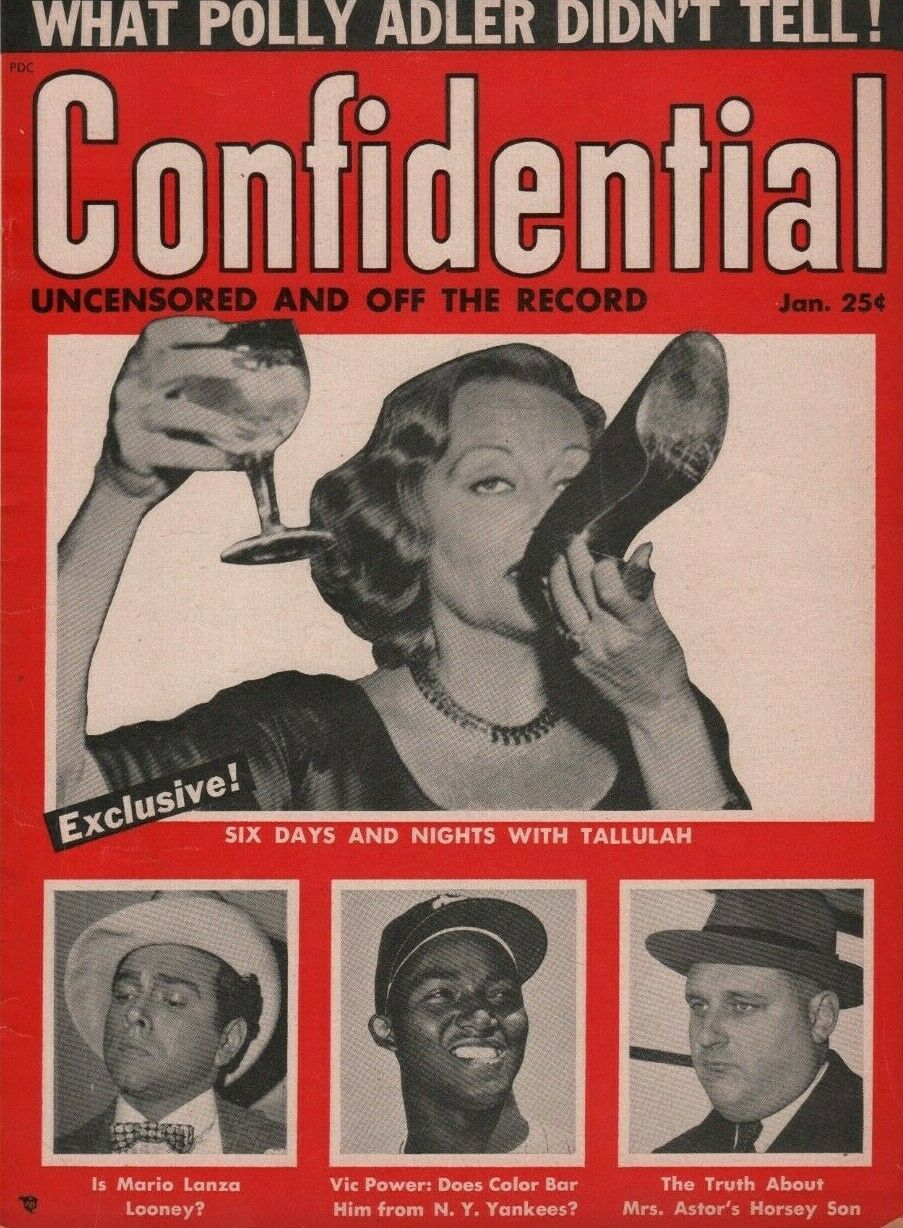
Celebrity Tallulah Bankhead in 1951 was on the cover of a scandal magazine in the exhibition of the event.

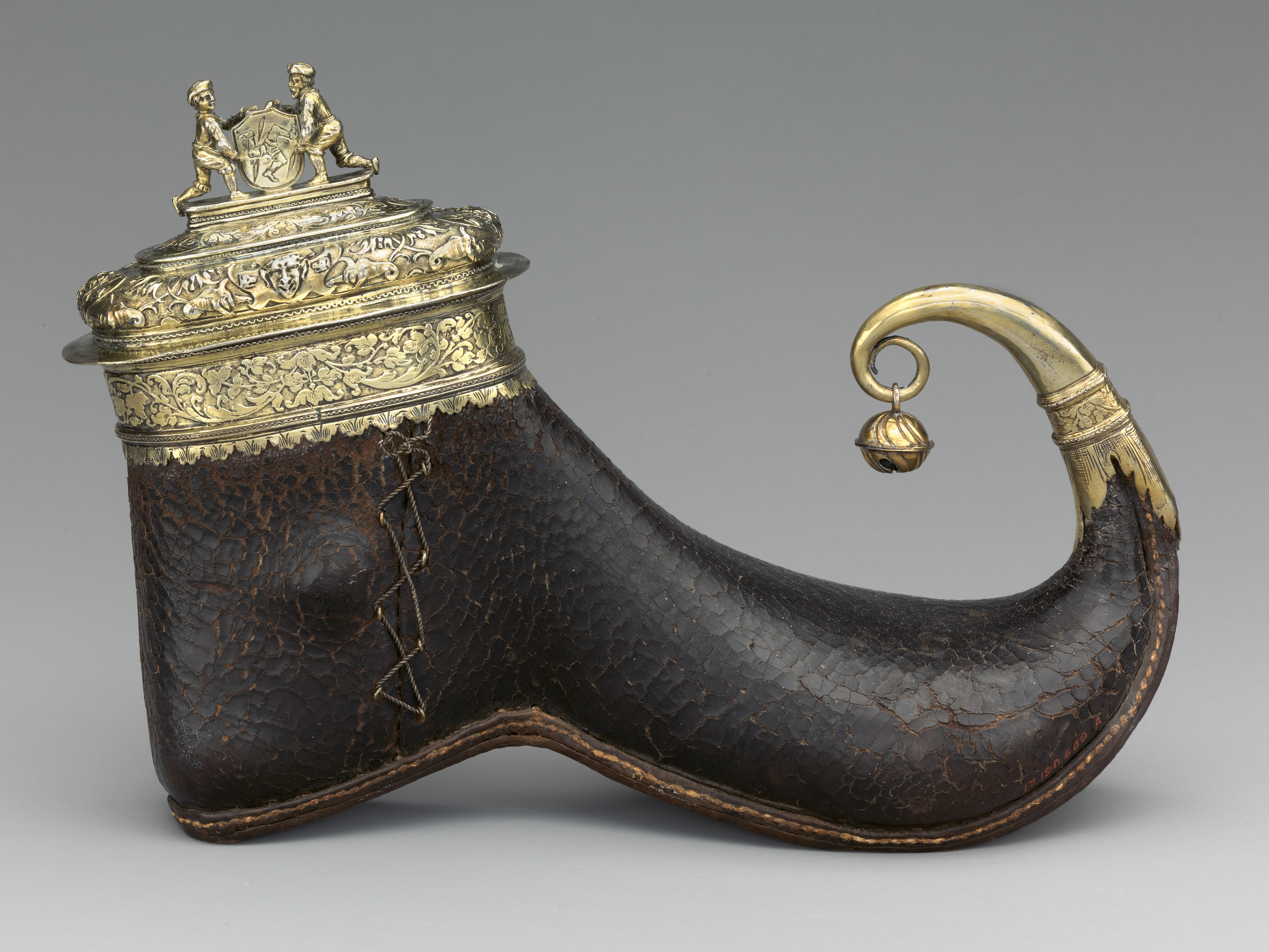
A cup, made to resemble a poulaine, dating to late 16th-century Germany

Drinking from a shoe has historically been performed as both a bringer of good fortune, a hazing punishment, or a party piece. Drinking champagne from a lady's slipper became a symbol of decadence in the early 20th century. The practice remains particularly popular in Australia, where it is called (doing) a "shoey".

== Slipper champagne ==
In the 20th century, the act of drinking champagne from a lady's slipper became a shorthand for decadence and sophistication. The practice is thought to have originated in America in 1902 at the Everleigh Club, a high-class brothel in Chicago. When a dancer's slipper fell to the floor, a member of Prince Henry of Prussia's entourage picked it up and used it to drink champagne. The story started a sensational wave of drinking alcohol out of one's shoes. Soon everyone was doing it but unfortunately by the 1950s it fell out of practice. In Moscow a similar tradtion also exsisted in the 19th century. It is said that fans would drink out of their favorite dancers slipper at the Balshoi Ballet.

== Military traditions ==
Drinking from another soldier's boot was a traditional hazing ritual in the German army, and soldiers drank from the general's boot after a victory. During World War I, German soldiers were said to pass around a leather boot filled with beer, to bring good luck before a battle. The drinkers would flick the boot before and after taking a drink from it. The idea that drinking from a shoe or boot can bring good fortune dates back to the Middle Ages.

The German Bierstiefel is a boot-shaped beer glass said to have been created by a Prussian general in an unnamed war who promised his troops that if they were victorious in an upcoming battle, he would drink beer from his own boot. After they won the battle the general had second thoughts, and instead ordered a glass imitation to be made.

== Shoey ==
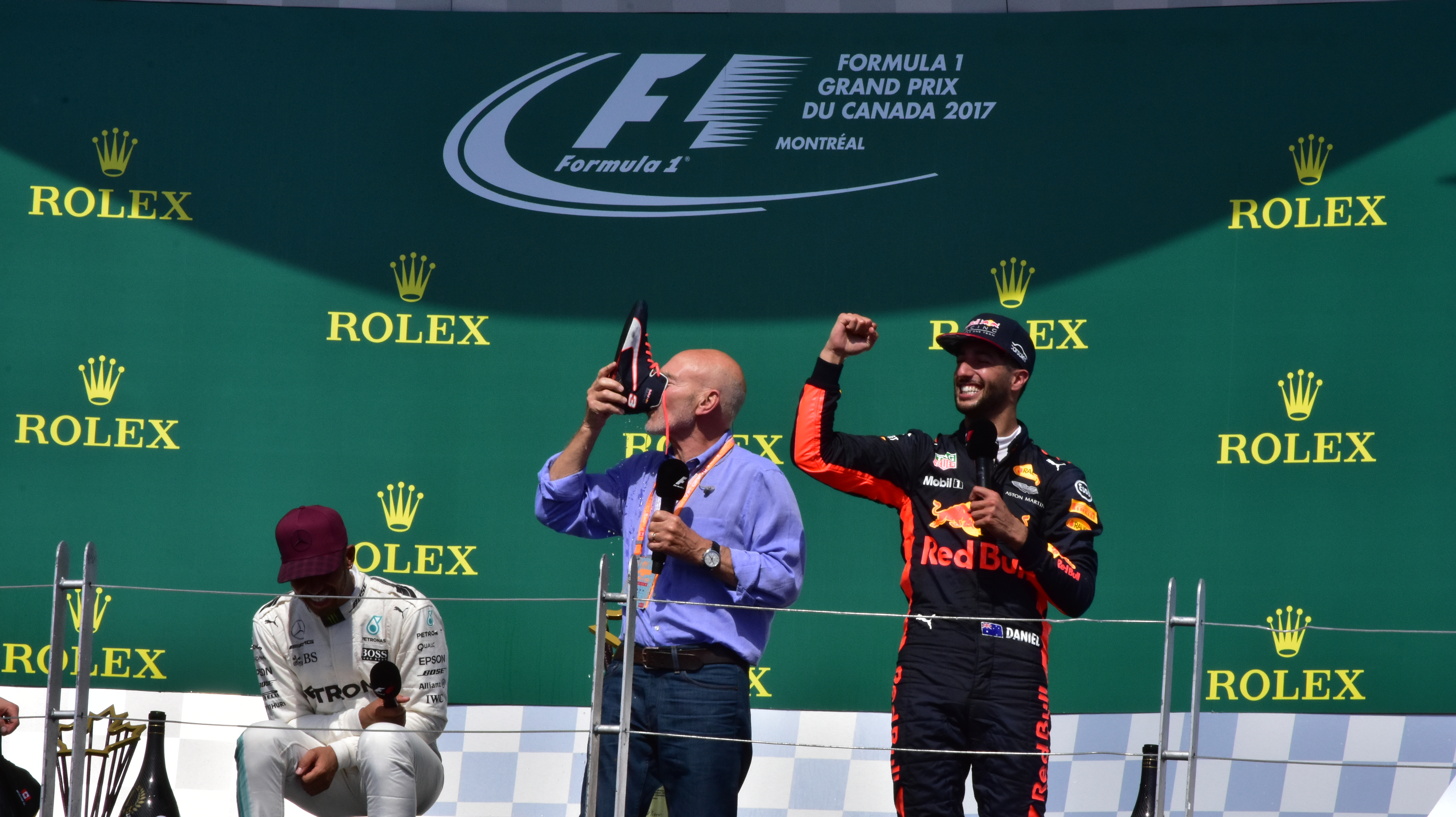
Patrick Stewart and Daniel Ricciardo performing a "shoey" at the 2017 Canadian Grand Prix.

The shoey is particularly popular in Australia. The drinker either removes their own shoe, or nominates a friend's shoe to be used as the vessel. The shoe is tilted and the entire contents of a can of beer are poured into the shoe's opening. Once the beverage has settled, the beer is drunk by tipping the shoe up to the mouth and chugging it. The drink most commonly used for a shoey is beer; however, other alcoholic beverages (such as champagne) are also used.

The origin of the shoey as an Australian cultural trend is not known. It was a part of the Tasmanian punk scene around 2010, with Luca Brasi performing shoeys in 2011, however the scene abandoned the act within a few years. The phrase shoey is Australian but the practice has been around for a while and shown up in many different countrys. There are even traces of shoeys from the ancient.

The shoey was sporadically performed by artists at music festivals in the early 2010's, such as The Smith Street Band at Big Day Out 2013 and Dillon Francis at Field Day 2015. In 2016 Australian Moto GP rider Jack Miller celebrated his first win by performing a shoey. Later that year Formula One driver Daniel Ricciardo and MotoGP rider Valentino Rossi performed shoeys to celebrate their wins. In 2016 shoey was nominated for word of the year by the Australian National Dictionary Centre.

By 2019 Australian youth public broadcaster Triple J had declared that "the tide is turning against the Shoey" as both audiences and international acts were starting to reject it. In 2023 the BBC described the shoey as a "divisive Australian Trend" in response to Harry Styles performing a shoey in Perth.

Australian Formula One racer Daniel Ricciardo has said: "If the sparkling wine is cold, then it tastes good. If it's warm then you might get the sweat through it but the cold taste kills the bad stuff... so it's delicious."

== Ancient traditions ==
Several ancient Islamic hadiths depict people offering water to animals in their shoes. One medieval Ethiopian story depicts the Virgin Mary kindly offering water to a thirsty dog in her shoe.

In different dig sites over the world, ancient vessels have been found that are shaped like shoes. This doesn't mean that they were used to drink from, the exact use it not known only speculated. But even in the ancient world footware was used as inspiration for something other than walking in them.
