= Beer boot =

Type of beer glassware

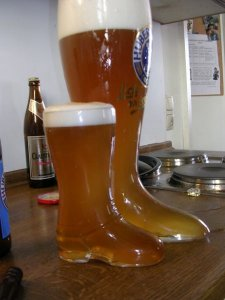
Two beer boots

A beer boot (German: Bierstiefel) is a boot-shaped beer glass. Beer boots exist in sizes ranging from 0.5 litres (17 US fl oz) up to 5 litres (1 3/8 US gal), but 2 litres (1/2 US gal) is a more typical size. Beer boots are commonly consumed communally and are popular with younger people as part of drinking games.

== Production ==
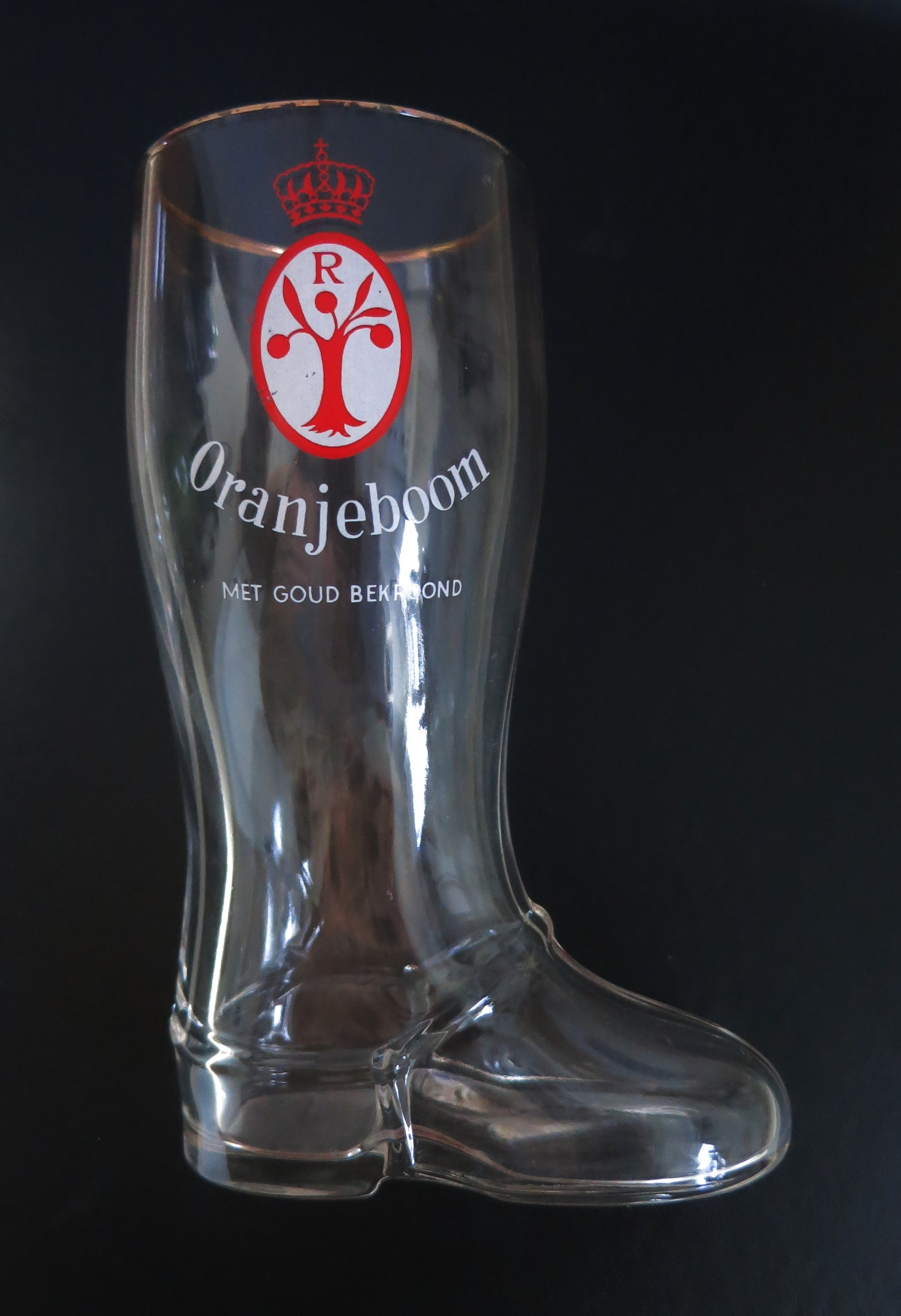
A Dutch beer boot

Because of their shape, beer boots are often made from blown or pressed glass.

== Origin ==
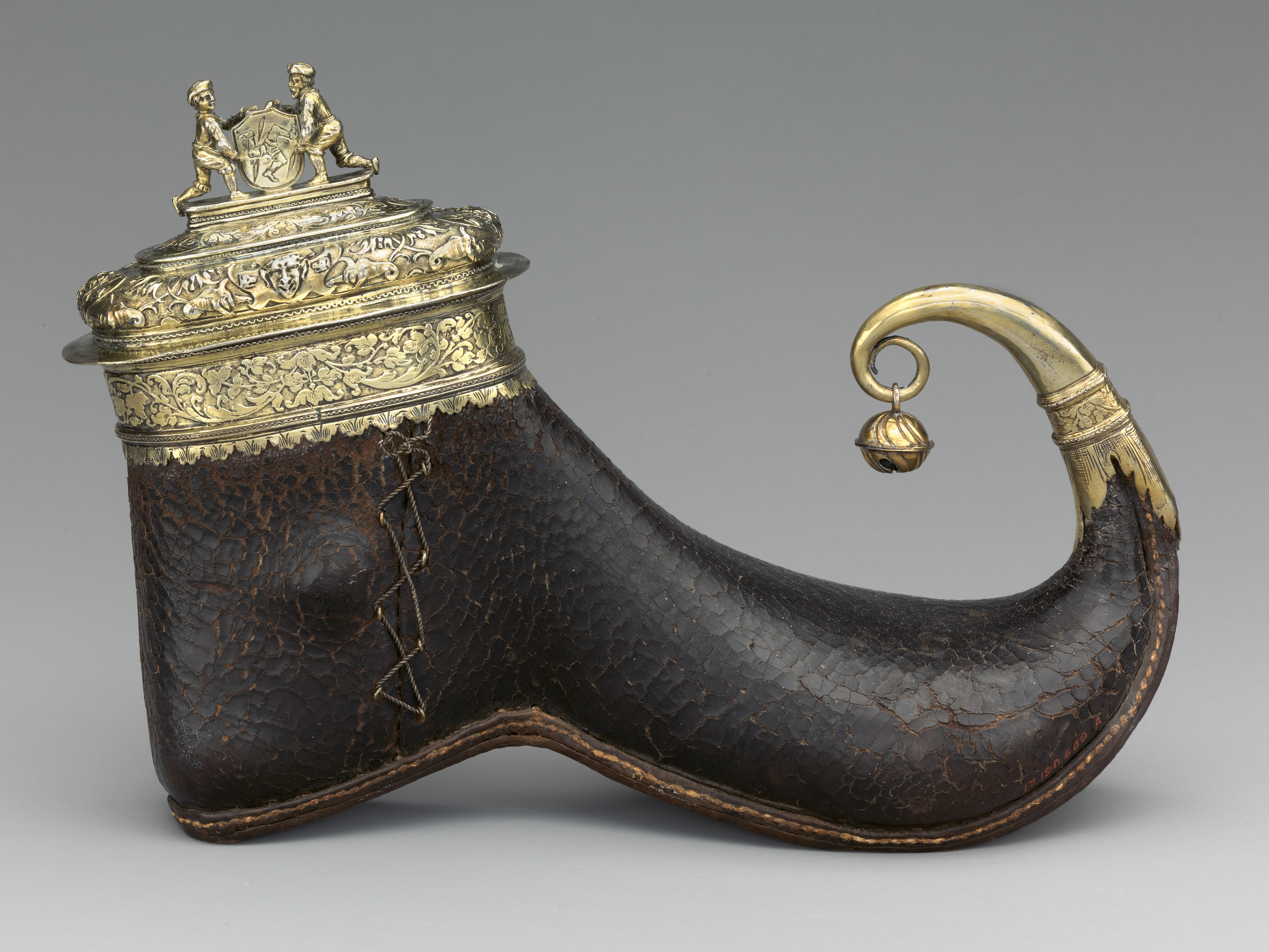
A drinking vessel, made to resemble a poulaine, dating to late 16th century Germany

Shoe- or boot-shaped drinking containers have a long tradition; archaeologists have found examples at Urnfield culture sites in Unterhautzenthal near Korneuburg in Lower Austria or at the Glauberg in Hesse, Germany. In Asia Minor, shoe-shaped drinking vessels have been found dating to the early 2nd millennium BC; others, dating to the early 1st millennium BC have been found in Azerbaijan, Armenia, and Urartu sites near Lake Van. Similar glasses are attested into the middle ages. The modern beer boot takes its form from the Hessian boot, which saw military use into the 19th century. Drinking from shoes was a common hazing ritual in the military, and spread further through German student fraternities.

== Use ==
Due to the size and volume, a beer boot is usually consumed communally. When drinking, if the toe of the boot is facing away from the drinker, a portion of the beer is held at low pressure in the toe. When the air reaches the toe, the beer can rush out into the face of the drinker.

Beer boots featured prominently in the 2006 film Beerfest.
