= Colosimi =

Colosimi Culuòsimi (Sicilian)
- Comune
- Comune di Colosimi
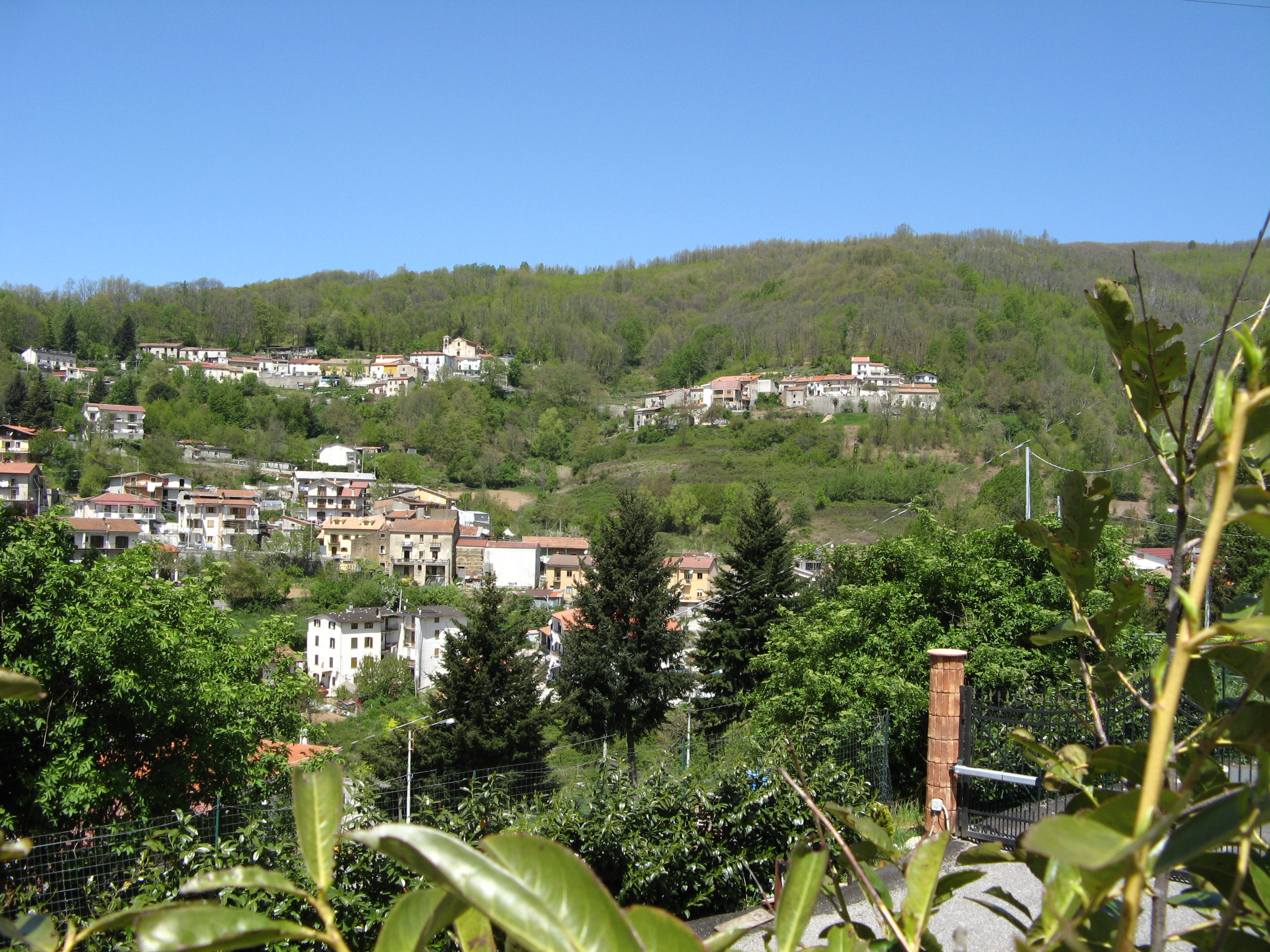

- Location within Italy Location within Calabria
- Coordinates: 39°7′N 16°24′E
- Country: Italy
- Region: Calabria
- Province: Cosenza (CS)
- Frazioni: Arcuri, Carrano, Coraci, Gigliotti, Manche, Mascari, Melilla, Rizzuti, Trearie, Volponi.

Government
  - Mayor: Giovanni Lucia

Area
  - Total: 24 km^{2} (9.3 sq mi)
- Elevation: 850 m (2,790 ft)

Population (30 April 2017)
  - Total: 1,247
  - Density: 52/km^{2} (130/sq mi)
- Demonym: Colosimari
- Time zone: UTC+1 (CET)
  - Summer (DST): UTC+2 (CEST)
- Postal code: 87050
- Dialing code: 0984
- Patron saint: Assumption of Mary
- Saint day: 15 August
- Website: Official website

Colosimi (Central Calabrian: Culuòsimi) is a town and comune (municipality) in the province of Cosenza in the Calabria region of southern Italy. Gangster James Colosimo was born here in 1878.

== History ==
The region is presented as a set of eleven small villages, including the capital, established in the 17th century. The etymology is related to the Colosimo surname, which is widespread in the area. Colosimi is potentially Greek in origin, being formed from the words 'colosi' (more correctly spelt as 'colossi' and being the plural of "colossus") and 'mi' (meaning 'me'). It is believed that until the early decades of the 7th century Colosimi was inhabited only in summer and that the first permanent inhabitants suffered disasters in the 17th century, such as famines and earthquakes, especially the large earthquake on 27 March 1638.

The first Colosimi administrative autonomy (1811) was related to the political strength of the city-owned University of Scigliano. Until 1820, the municipality of Colosimi belonged as a territory of the town of Bianchi, Calabria. It became autonomous in that year.

In 1813, Colosimi became home to the oldest Masonic Workshop, namely the Mamertini lodge, which, together with the Ginnosofisti silani di Carlopoli and the La Sila di Decollatura, can be called the cultural forges of these upland moors in the nineteenth century.
