= Dumas Brothel =

Historic bordello in Butte, Montana, United States

- U.S. Historic district – Contributing property
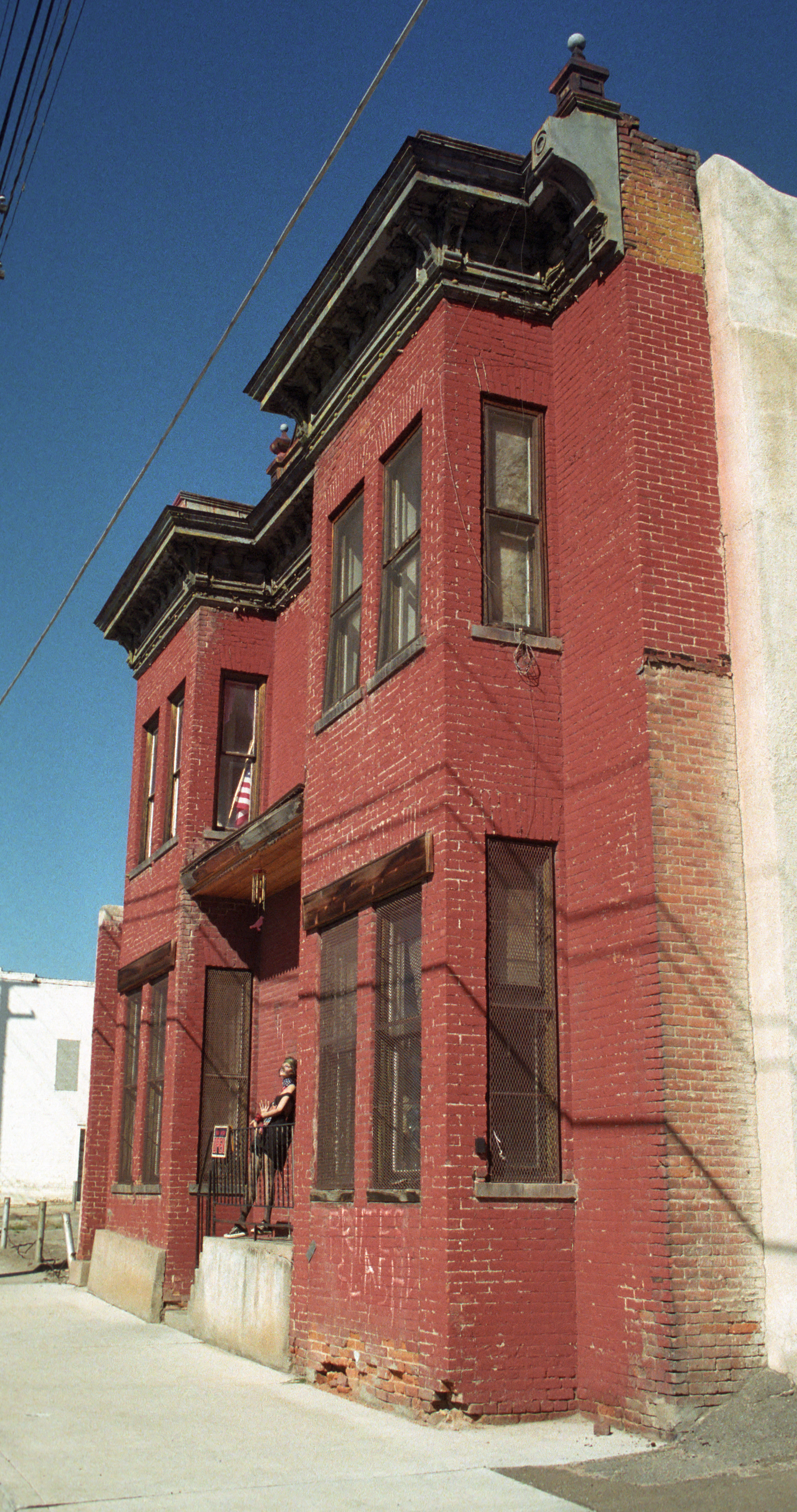
- The Dumas Brothel

- Location within Montana Location within the United States
- Location: 45 East Mercury Street, Butte, Montana, United States
- Coordinates: 46.01143°N 112.534372°W
- Built: 1890
- Architectural style: Victorian
- Part of: Butte-Anaconda Historic District (ID66000438)

The Dumas Brothel was a brothel in Butte, Montana, United States. The brothel was founded by French-Canadian brothers Joseph and Arthur Nadeau in 1890 and named after the nominal owner, Delia Nadeau, née Dumas, who was Joseph's wife. It grew considerably through the years, with the miners employed by the city's copper mines often patronizing the establishment.

After several changes of the "madams" and continuing pressure from authorities, the brothel closed in 1982, described as "a rare, intact commentary on social history". At the time of its closure, it was the longest operating brothel in the United States, having operated years after prostitution was made illegal. After closing, the brothel changed hands several times, eventually becoming a tourist attraction owned and managed by a series of Butte residents.

== Background ==
In the 1870s, a group of women, called "ladies of the line", began selling sexual services on Park Street, in the north of the city of Butte, Montana. When the tents and shacks on the street were replaced with legitimate businesses some years later, the "Park Street girls", as they had come to be known, moved to the south of the city. By the mid-1880s, a variety of dance halls, gambling houses and saloons had appeared in the city. By 1888, Butte's East Galena Street was lined with brothels; in fact, nearly every building on the street housed prostitution. This area of Galena Street would come to be known as the "twilight zone". Paramount to these establishments was the Casino Theater, a mixture of a saloon, dance hall and brothel. In the late 19th century, several prominent Montanans owned brothels in Butte, including Lee Mantle, who would go on to be a United States senator, and Anton M. Holter, a wealthy businessman from Helena, Montana.

Two French Canadian brothers, Joseph and Arthur Nadeau, would eventually acquire the most property in Butte's prostitution areas, or "red light district". The brothers built a brothel in 1890 on 45 East Mercury Street and named it for Delia Nadeau, née Dumas, Joseph's wife. By the turn of the century, there were three high-class sex houses in Butte: the Hotel Victoria, the Windsor Hotel and the Dumas Brothel, also called the Dumas Hotel.

== Description ==
The Dumas Brothel Museum is a two-story brick building at the north side of east Mercury street in the historic city of Butte, Montana. It also includes a basement level containing clandestine tunnels. There is a single story addition that was added to the rear of the main structure in 1912, and this leads directly onto the infamous brick-lined "Venus Alley", once the hub of Butte's red light district. The original structure features original vaulted skylights, and the upper level is surrounded by an interior balcony, which still provides a birds eye view for on-lookers to glimpse the suites (or "cribs") below. The basement afforded much more basic accommodations, and was built to connect the Dumas to Butte's business corridor via a tunnel system.

The Dumas Brothel was purchased by natives Michael Piche and Travis Eskelsen, who have been working to restore the building. They operate a museum and provide tours of the brothel beginning each spring and lasting until fall. Recently, they have added an antique shop and a souvenir gift shop, with plans to come that include opening a bed and breakfast at the site. After the death of Piche in 2018, Eskelsen put the building up for sale.

== History and operations ==
Scant details are known about the early history of the Dumas Brothel; however, two early boarders of the house listed their occupations as "gambler" and "saloon man" in census records. By 1900, the brothel was occupied by Madam Grace McGinnis, and her servant, a Chinese prostitute. The cost of sex in the brothel at the turn of the 20th century was fifty cents (equivalent to $19.35 in 2025), with the working girls receiving about 40 percent of that amount. Despite the size of the brothel, by 1902 Madame McGinnis had only five working girls and a musician under her employment. In 1903 the Dumas and businesses like it in Butte's red light district were unusually lucrative ventures. These businesses were frequented by miners from the local Anaconda Copper Mining Company. That year, traffic grew to a point where the Dumas's operations had to be expanded, building "cribs" (tiny cubicles where the girls worked) in the basement of the house. There were several ways potential clients could access the brothel. A back door of the Dumas opened into Pleasant Alley, near South Wyoming Street, which was the busiest section of Butte's red light area. The basement cribs could also be accessed by a staircase from the front sidewalk. Even though the Dumas operated 24 hours a day with several girls taking three shifts, by 1910, there were only two women reported to actually be living there. Instead the prostitutes lived in other parts of Pleasant Alley, and commuted to the brothel for their shifts. In Butte, the activities of the city's prostitutes were generally restricted to Galena and Mercury Street. From the windows of their street-facing cribs, the girls would attract prospective clients while being in varying states of undress. The Butte Miner, a local newspaper, explained how the girls did this:

With an abandon that has no trace of modesty in it, these women lean out of their windows and address the vilest kind of language imaginable to people passing on the street, or else boldly make their appearance on the thoroughfare and visit from one crib to another.

The Dumas's business and those like it were criticized by a number of people who sought to reform the red light district. Reverend William Biederwolf condemned Butte as "the lowest sinkhole of vice in the west," and that he saw "enough legitimate vice in Butte to damn the souls of every young man and young woman in it." Biederwolf held revival services for residents which attracted "rounders, gamblers and habitués of the red light district". However, the local business benefited and even depended on the support of the sex workers at the Dumas and other establishments like it. The prostitutes would buy their dresses at local clothiers, frequent the city's dry cleaners and would patronize Chinese herbalists, looking for birth control potions and venereal disease remedies. To ensure that their operations were unhampered, the girls at the Dumas would pay the city's police and governance five dollar "fines". Instead of the closing or relocating the red light district, the mayor and police of Butte ordered that the women wear longer skirts and high-necked blouses and that they "refrain from any indecent exposures." After these ordinances were put in place, the Butte Miner reported that "nothing was seen in the district except long dresses and long faces. What the women say about the matter is not fit for publication." By 1910 the people were petitioning Mayor Charles Nevin to shut down the district; with the district contributing two thousand dollars to the city's coffers every month, the efforts eventually died.

In 1913, the brothel was expanded again. A one-story structure was added to the building, increasing the number of cribs by eight; four of the added cribs opened directly onto Pleasant Alley, by that time known as Venus Alley. When copper prices went up, the more than 14,000 miners in the city experienced a pay-rise of twenty-five cents and injected an additional $6,000 into Butte's economy. The Dumas also experienced an upswing in patronage. As a result of the added patronage, the brothel added five partitions and a staircase in 1916, and the ground floor, once a grand parlor, was partitioned into cribs.

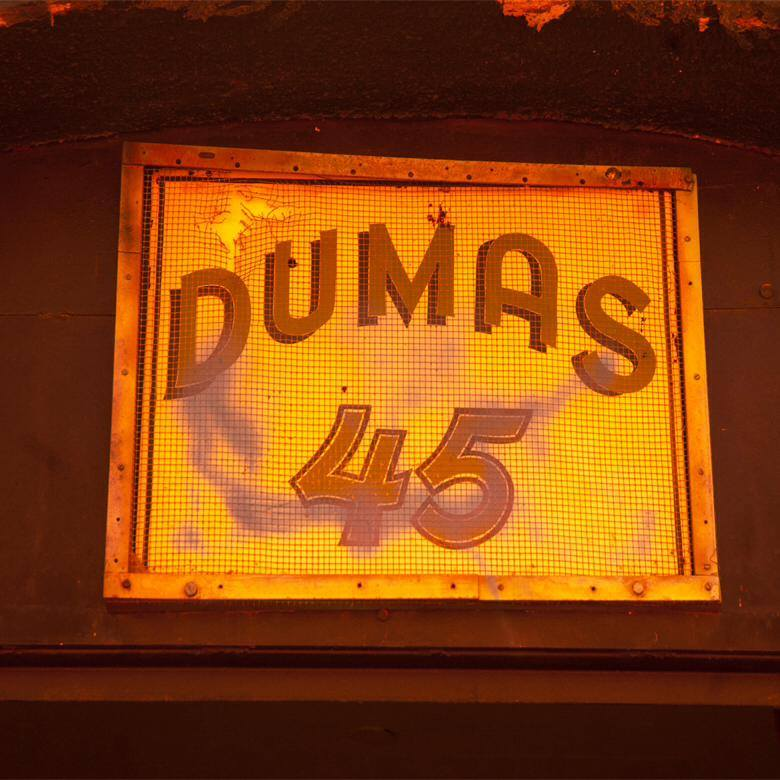
Dumas Brothel sign

World War I and Prohibition impelled local lawmakers to initiate a crackdown on Butte's red light district; by 1917, the district was effectively closed. Signs saying "Men Under 21 Keep Out" were commonplace, and in the next census, prostitution had completely disappeared as a declared profession in Butte. The Dumas, however, remained in operation. In 1925, Anne Vallet began overseeing the Dumas for the Nadeau family, and in the 1930s, operations had passed to Madam Rose Davis. In 1940, Lillian Walden and her husband Dick began running the brothel, raising the price of sex at the brothel to $2 (equivalent to $46 in 2025). Three years later, the U.S. government ordered all brothels shut down to prevent the spread of venereal diseases among soldiers in World War II. In response, the Dumas began operating even more furtively, now under the guise of being a boardinghouse. The "window-shopping" was abandoned completely and a heavy steel door was installed at the back of the Dumas with a small sliding window; customers would only gain entrance after the sliding window was opened and their identity was acknowledged. Additionally, doorbells were added and a code system for dealing with troublesome guests was also employed.

When Lillian Walden retired in 1950, the price for service at the brothel was $5 (equivalent to $67 in 2025). Afterwards, the Dumas's operations went to Elinore Knott. The Nadeaus also ceased being owners of the brothel around this time. Knott's management of the Dumas was short. In 1955, she committed suicide after her lover died of a heart attack. When the late 1960s came about, several local police officers were taking the initiative to close the three operating high-class sex houses: Hotel Victoria, Windsor Hotel and the Dumas. The Dumas did not remain closed for long however, with its next madam, Bonita Farren, operating it from 1955 until her death from cancer in 1969. In 1970 the Dumas was listed in the National Register of Historic Places as a "Victorian Brothel" and an active house of prostitution. By the following year, Ruby Garret, a local resident of Butte for some thirty years, had purchased the Dumas. Garret would pay local police officers and officials $200 to $300 a month in return for their silence about the Dumas's activities. Under Garrett, the cost of a prostitute was $20. She would come upon financial difficulties however, being charged with tax evasion in 1981. The Dumas Brothel was closed the following year.

== After closure ==
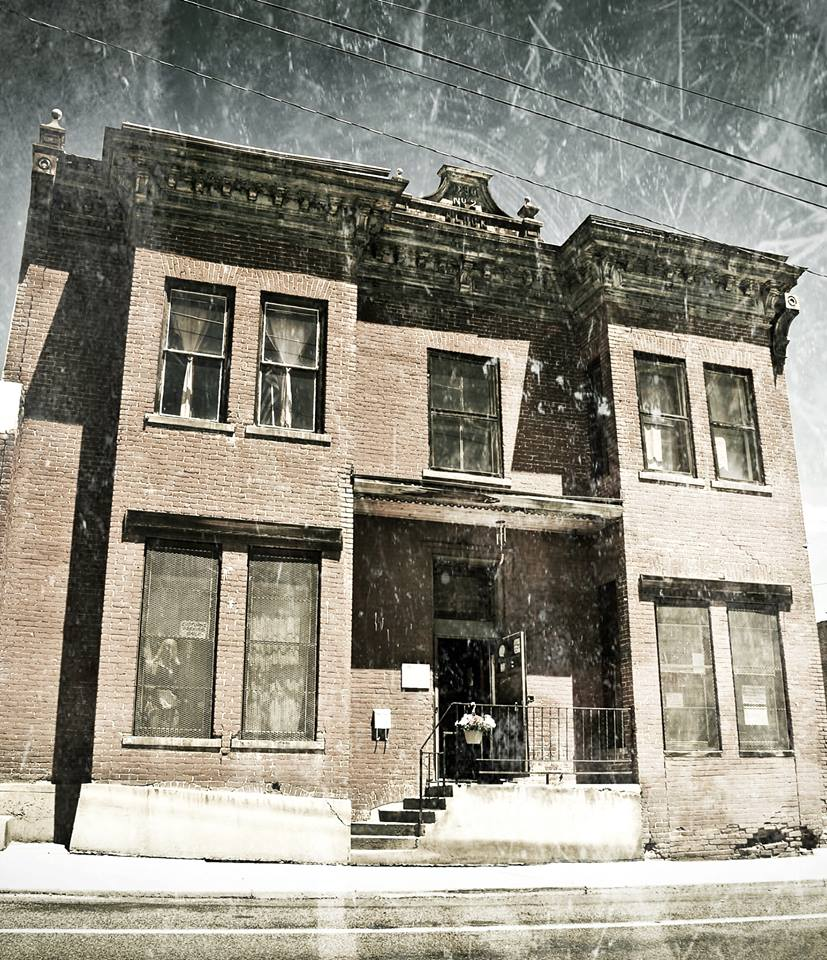
In 2013

In 1982, Ruby Garrett, the last madam of the Dumas, was convicted of federal tax evasion and served six months in prison. The brothel was closed soon after, but not before a robbery took place there. When it closed, it was the longest operating brothel in the United States, having operated for 92 years, long after prostitution was outlawed.

Garret sold the Dumas to an antiques dealer named Rudy Giecek on the condition that it was preserved in its original state. Giecek turned the brothel into a museum and operated it as such for most of the 1990s. However, in 1998, Giecek encountered financial difficulties and attempted to sell the building. The International Sex Worker Foundation for Art, Culture and Education (ISWFACE) responded. The ISWFACE sought to reopen the Dumas as not only a museum but also a gallery and convention center. Ellen Baumler of the National Register of Historic Places wrote in support for the rescue of the Dumas that "[it] is not only significant as the last standing parlor house in this area of Butte, but also because of its length of operation as a rare, intact commentary on social history." Some were against the restoration of the Dumas, including former prostitutes in Butte, but the operation proceeded—at least until September 2000, when Giecek claimed the ISWFACE owed him $52,000 in wages for work performed at the Dumas. Giecek sued and was granted the wages he petitioned for and additional penalties. The business deal with ISWFACE was terminated however. In the years that followed, the Dumas was put up for auction twice as Giecek did not have the money to maintain the building.

In late May 2005, Giecek was escorting a New York Times reporter through the Dumas for an interview when he discovered the place had been broken into. Giecek, low on funds and worried about his health, had shut down the Dumas earlier that month after it had operated offering $5 tours. After the robbery, Giecek discovered "dismantled beds, stolen antique lamps and artwork and emptied glass cases full of brothel artifacts" as well as missing "rare sex toys".

In June 2012, the Dumas was conveyed to new owners, locals Michael Piche and Travis Eskelsen. By this time however, the building was in great disrepair; among other things, there was water damage, a collapsed wall and no structurally sound roof. The new owners planned to have summer tours for $8 in the following year, but their ultimate goal was turning the Dumas into a bed and breakfast. "It needs to be around. It needs to be here for the rest of the community and the people who want to visit it," said Piche. In late 2013, the duo sought a loan from the local urban revitalization body in Butte. The requested amount was $92,000 with an additional $8,750 grant. As of December 2013, tours were still being offered at the Dumas on a limited basis.

In December 2018, David and Charlee Prince, a couple from Forsyth, MT, purchased the Dumas for $29,000 in a tax sale. The Princes are working to restore the building and preserve its historic character. Additionally, they conduct paranormal investigations of the property. As of July 2023, tours are being offered every other Saturday from 11 AM - 6 PM.

Rudy Giecek claims that the Dumas is haunted by the ghost of Elinore Knott. Author Karen Stevens also recalled paranormal experiences related to the brothel. It is suggested that Knott's ghost is one of several at the Dumas.

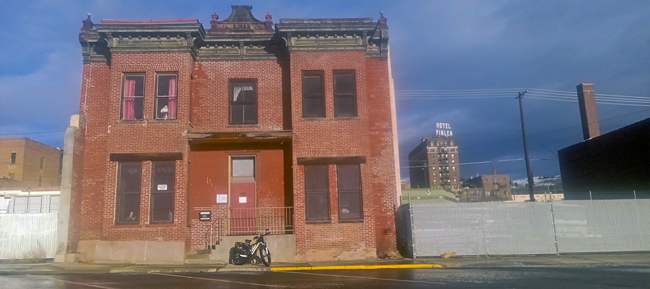
Dumas Brothel Butte America

== See also ==
- Everleigh Club
- Storyville, New Orleans
- Wallace, Idaho
