= Abbott Kahler =

American writer

- Born: Karen Abbott; January 23, 1973 (age 53); Philadelphia, Pennsylvania, U.S.
- Other name: Karen Abbott
- Occupation: Author
- Website: https://abbottkahler.com/

Abbott Kahler (born January 23, 1973), formerly known as Karen Abbott, is an American author of historical nonfiction and historical fiction. Her works include Sin in the Second City, American Rose, Liar, Temptress, Soldier, Spy, and The Ghosts of Eden Park.

== Writing ==
Sin in the Second City tells the true story of the Everleigh Club, a famous American brothel, and the club's proprietors, sisters Ada and Minna Everleigh. American Rose is an account of stripteaser Gypsy Rose Lee. Liar, Temptress, Soldier, Spy tells the true story of four women who became spies during the Civil War.

The Ghosts of Eden Park is about a German immigrant named George Remus, who quit practicing law and started trafficking whiskey. Within two years, Remus had earned the title "King of the Bootleggers."

Abbott is a contributor to Smithsonian magazine's history blog, "Past Imperfect". She also has written for The New Yorker.

== Bibliography ==
- Sin in the Second City: Madams, Ministers, Playboys, and the Battle for America’s Soul (2007) ISBN 9781400065301
- American Rose: A Nation Laid Bare: The Life and Times of Gypsy Rose Lee (2010) ISBN 9781400066919
- Liar, Temptress, Soldier, Spy: Four Women Undercover in the Civil War (2014) ISBN 9780062092892
- The Ghosts of Eden Park: The Bootleg King, the Women Who Pursued Him, and the Murder that Shocked Jazz-Age America (2019) ISBN 9780451498625
