= Big Jim Colosimo =

American mobster (1878–1920)

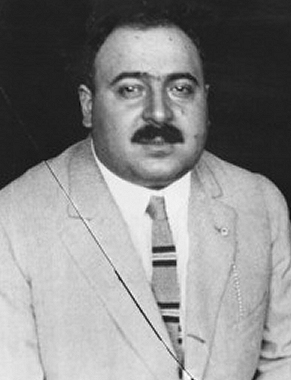
- Born: Vincenzo Colosimo; February 18, 1878; Colosimi, Calabria, Italy
- Died: May 11, 1920 (aged 42); Chicago, Illinois, U.S.
- Cause of death: Gunshot wounds
- Resting place: Oak Woods Cemetery, Chicago
- Other names: "Big Jim", "Diamond Jim"
- Occupation: Crime boss
- Spouses: Victoria Moresco (m. 1902; div. 1920) Dale Winter (m. 1920)
- Allegiance: Chicago Outfit

Vincenzo Colosimo (Italian: [vinˈtʃɛntso koˈlɔːzimo]; February 16, 1878 – May 11, 1920), known as James "Big Jim" Colosimo or as "Diamond Jim", was an Italian-American Mafia crime boss who emigrated from Calabria, Italy, in 1895 and built a criminal empire in Chicago based on prostitution, gambling and racketeering. He gained power through petty crime and heading a chain of brothels. From 1902 until his death in 1920, he led a gang known after his death as the Chicago Outfit. Colosimo was assassinated on May 11, 1920, and no one was ever charged with his murder. Johnny Torrio, an enforcer whom Colosimo imported in 1909 from New York, seized control of Colosimo's businesses after his death. Al Capone, a close associate of Torrio, has been accused of involvement in Colosimo's murder but was not yet in Chicago at the time.

== Early years ==
Colosimo was born on February 16, 1878, to Luigi Colosimo and his second wife Giuseppina Mascaro in the town of Colosimi, Province of Cosenza, Italy. He emigrated from Italy to the US at the age of 17, starting out as a street sweeper in the First Ward. Colosimo's successful efforts to unionize the ward's street sweepers attracted the attention of First Ward aldermen Michael "Hinky Dink" Kenna and John Coughlin. They made him a precinct captain and street inspector. This gave Colosimo the political connections that helped him rise to power as a mob boss.

== Prostitution empire ==
In 1902, Colosimo married Victoria Moresco, an established Chicago madam and together they began expanding their prostitution business. The First Ward aldermen made Colosimo their bagman for collecting all vice related payoffs in their district.

Among Colosimo's first brothels was The Victoria (named after his wife), on Archer and Armour Avenue, and The Saratoga, at Dearborn and 22nd Street. Within a few years, Colosimo had expanded this to nearly 200 brothels and had also made inroads into gambling and racketeering. Colosimo was reputedly making $50,000 ($720,000 in 2022) per month from his various legal and illegal operations.

Later, Colosimo acquired another nickname, "Diamond Jim," because he frequently dressed in a white suit and wore diamond pins, rings, and other jewelry. He was even known to carry loose cut stones on his person as playthings.

== Help from New York and expansion ==
By 1909, Black Hand extortion was a serious threat to Colosimo in Chicago. He brought in gangster John "The Fox" Torrio from Brooklyn and rose to be second in command of Colosimo's organization by 1914. Various sources claim Torrio's kinship to either Colosimo or Moresco, but has never been supported by evidence.

In 1910, Colosimo opened Colosimo's Cafe, a restaurant and nightclub at 2126 South Wabash. It quickly became a popular destination for prominent Chicagoans and affluent visitors, gaining nationwide fame. Colosimo's crew grew into a multi-ethnic, hierarchical gang, with Italian, Irish, Polish, and Jewish gangsters. Colosimo's vice interests eventually expanded into Chicago's suburbs, including Burnham and South Chicago.

In 1915, "Big Bill" Thompson was elected mayor of Chicago, whose corruption allowed Colosimo's vice empire to flourish. Still the Ward's bagman for bribes and graft, Colosimo paid the mayor's office directly during the Thompson administration.

In 1919, Torrio and Colosimo opened a brothel at 2222 South Wabash called the Four Deuces, referencing the address. Torrio hired his old Brooklyn colleague Al Capone to work as a bartender and bouncer, which gave Capone his entry into Chicago crime.

== Betrayal ==
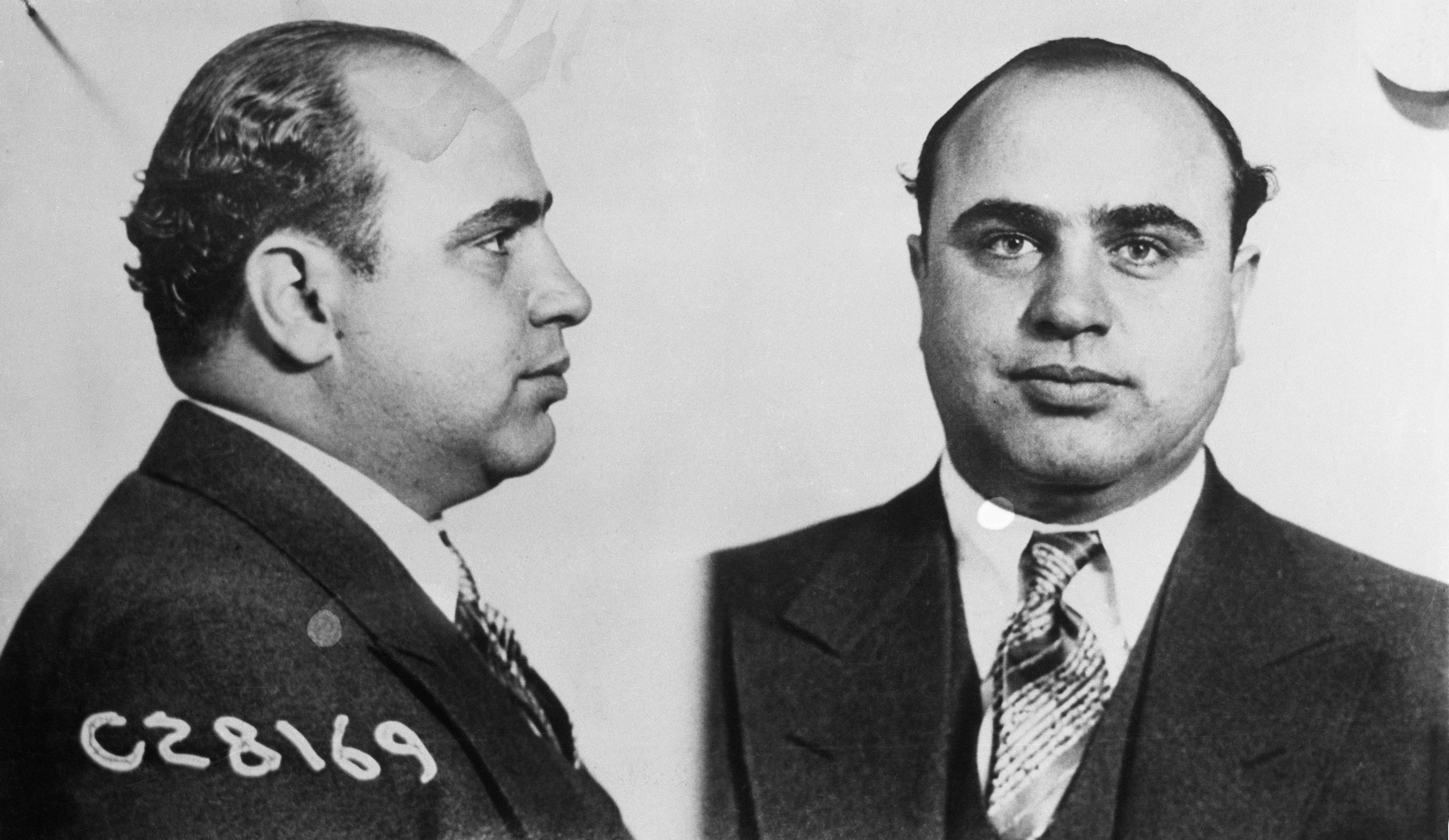
Al Capone mugshot

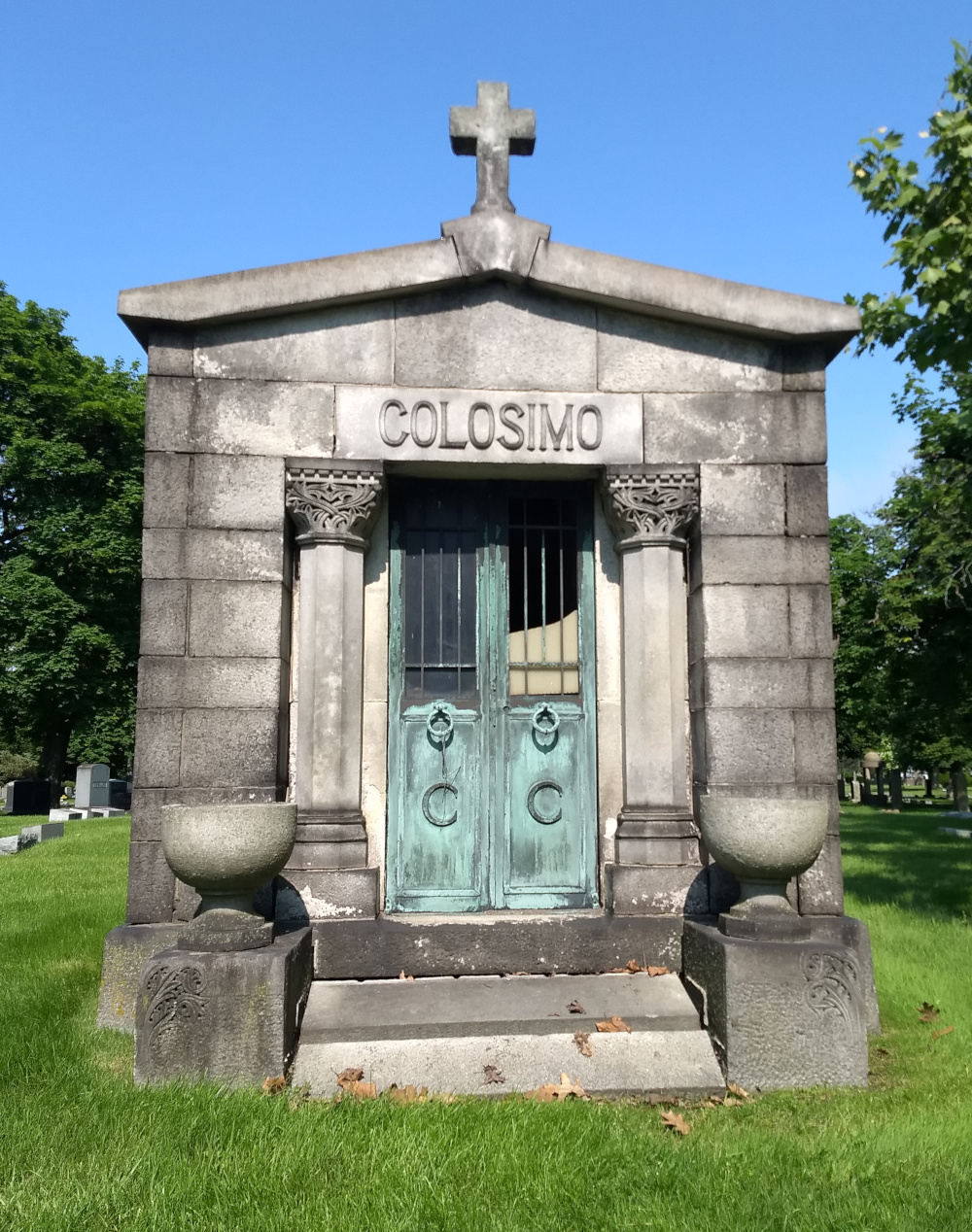
Colosimo mausoleum at Oak Woods Cemetery

When Prohibition went into effect in 1920, Torrio pushed for the gang to enter into bootlegging, but Colosimo stubbornly refused. In March 1920, Colosimo secured an uncontested divorce from Moresco. A month later, he and singer Dale Winter, the star attraction at his club, eloped to West Baden Springs, Indiana. Upon their return, he bought a home on the South Side. On May 11, 1920, Colosimo drove to Colosimo's Cafe to meet an associate he had never met before. He was shot and killed a few minutes after entering the restaurant by a gunman hiding in the cloak room. A bullet entered Colosimo's brain, behind his right ear. Contract killer Frankie Yale had allegedly traveled from New York to Chicago and personally killed longtime gang boss Colosimo at the behest of Torrio. Although suspected by Chicago police, Yale was never officially charged. Colosimo was allegedly murdered because he stood in the way of his gang making bootlegging profits, having "gone soft" after his marriage with Winter.

Colosimo was a gang leader to organize the disparate parts of Chicago's crime scene. After his death, Torrio took over his gang, later to be replaced by Al Capone. His mob eventually became the infamous Chicago Outfit that ruled over some parts of the city.

Colosimo was interred at Oak Woods Cemetery in Chicago, in a lavish funeral witnessed by 5,000 mourners. His pall bearers, actual and honorary, included three judges, eight aldermen, a congressman, and several ward bosses.

== In popular media ==
=== Film ===
- In Scarface: The Shame of a Nation (1932), the death of "Big Louie" Costillo (Harry J. Vejar) is loosely based on Colosimo's assassination. Antonio "Tony" Camonte kills Big Louie at the behest of his friend Johnny Lovo, Costillo's right-hand man. Lovo was based on Johnny Torrio and Camonte on Al Capone, and the film presents Costillo's murder as the beginning of Lovo and Camonte's involvement in bootlegging, similar to how Colosimo's refusal to allow bootlegging is considered the primary reason for his murder.
- Joe De Santis played Colosimo in Al Capone (1959).
- Frank Campanella played Colosimo in Capone (1975).

=== Television ===
- Peter Siragusa portrayed Colosimo in the pilot episode of The Untouchables (1993).
- Colosimo and a fictionalized account of his murder was the subject of a 1993 episode of The Young Indiana Jones Chronicles, titled "Young Indiana Jones and the Mystery of the Blues." Colosimo was portrayed by Raymond Serra, Victoria Moresco by Linda Lutz, and Dale Winter by Jane Krakowski.
- Colosimo was portrayed by Peter Banks in a 1994 episode of In Suspicious Circumstances, titled No Witness, No Case (a reference to a prostitute whom Colosimo had sent from Chicago to Connecticut, who was murdered after she talked to the police).
- In 2010, Colosimo's murder was depicted in the series premiere of HBO's Boardwalk Empire. It depicts Colosimo, played by Frank Crudele, as the victim of a hit ordered by Torrio and committed by Frankie Yale to allow Torrio to go into bootlegging. He is shown being shot at the back of the head while listening to an Enrico Caruso record in his restaurant.
- He was portrayed by Andre King in the 2016 docuseries The Making of the Mob: Chicago.

=== Music ===
- In Ian Hunter's song "Resurrection Mary" (on The Artful Dodger), the storyteller, who sees the infamous ghost of the title, used to do "the numbers for Big Jim."
- Kool G Rap makes a reference to Colosimo in the song "Guns Blazing (Drums of Death Pt. 1)" by UNKLE on the 1998 album Psyence Fiction.

=== Theater ===
- In the musical Chicago, the character Velma Kelly mentions she wants to perform at Big Jim Colosimo's, bribing the matron for the opportunity.

=== Gaming ===
- In Mafia: Definitive Edition (2020), the mentioned offscreen murder of the Illinois mob boss Felice Peppone in 1922, by his two capos Ennio Salieri and Marcu Morello to get into the bootlegging business and form their own Mafia families in the city of Lost Heaven, is loosely inspired by the murder of Colosimo.

== See also ==
- List of homicides in Illinois § Organized crime
- List of unsolved murders (1900–1979)

American Mafia
Preceded by New title	Chicago Outfit Boss; 1910–1920	Succeeded by John Torrio
