= 1899 Chicago mayoral election =

- April 4, 1899
- Turnout: 85%
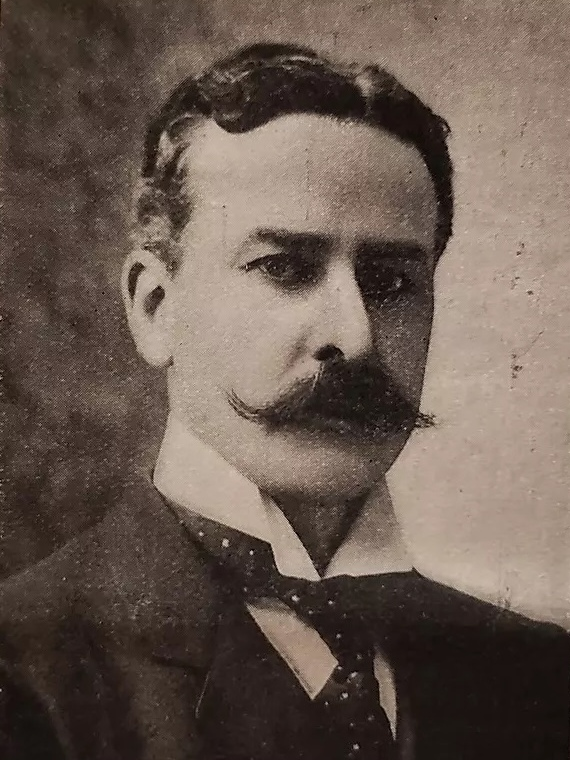

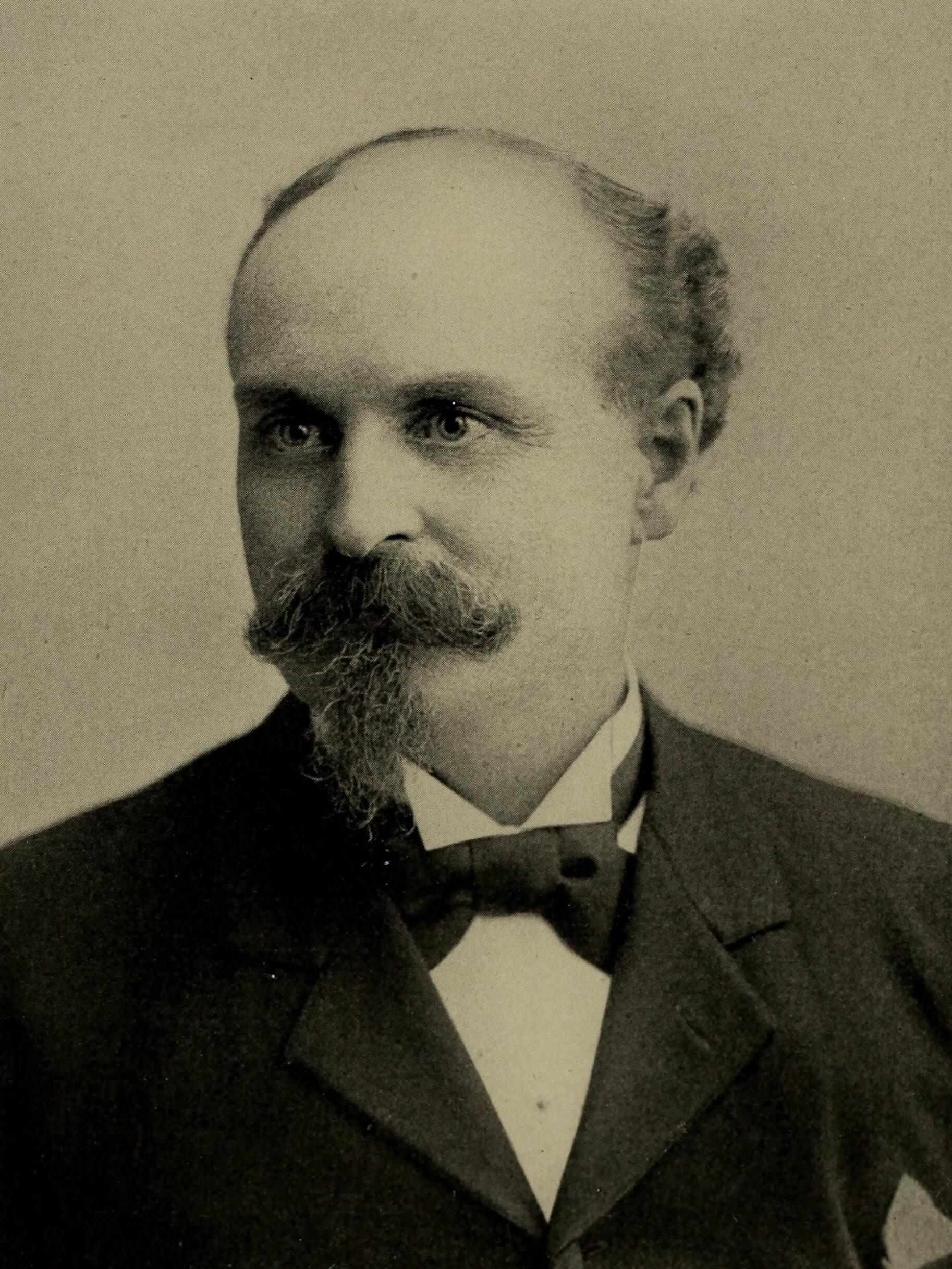

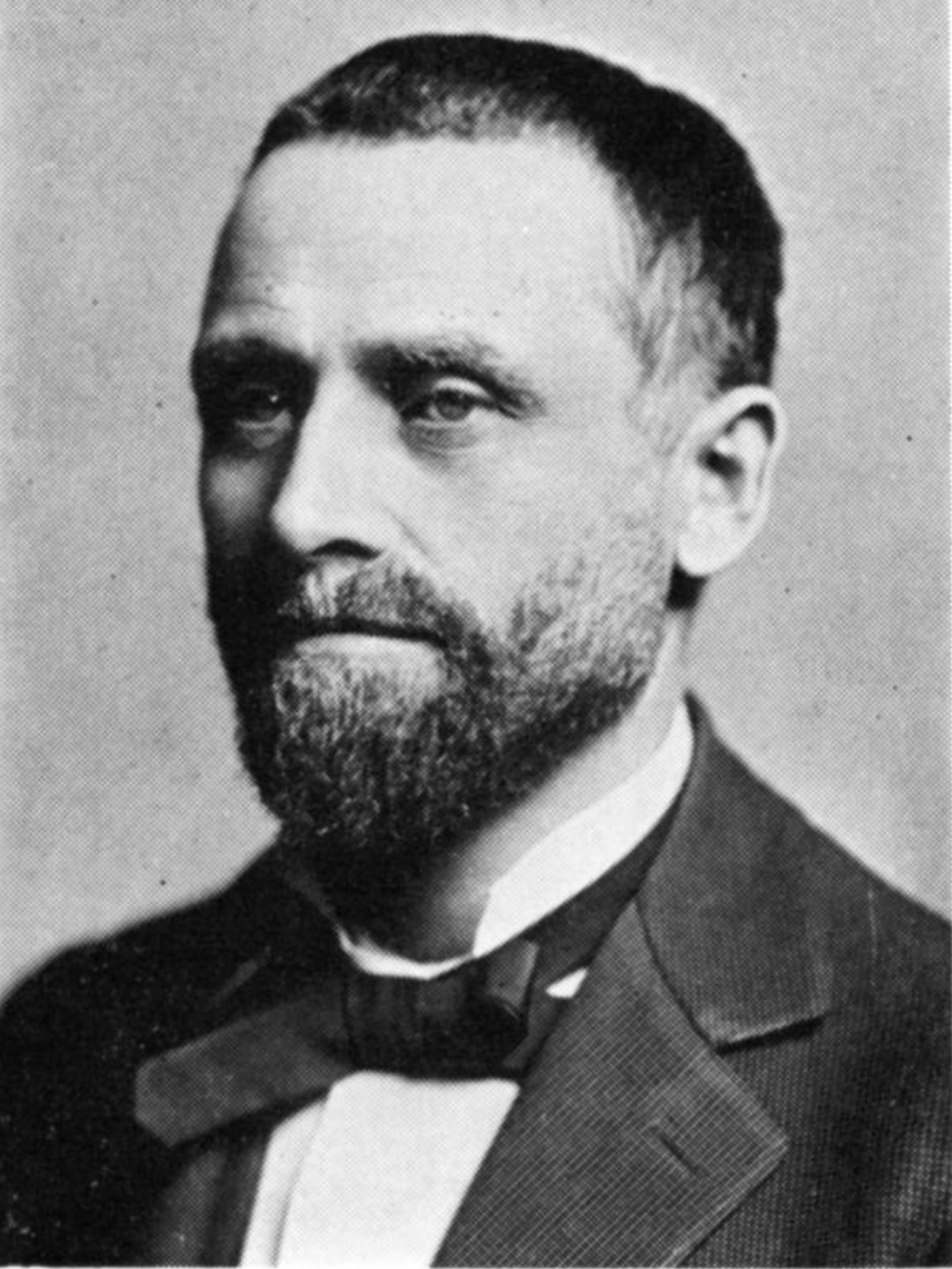
Nominee	Carter Harrison IV	Zina R. Carter	John Peter Altgeld
Party	Democratic Party	Republican Party	Municipal Ownership
Popular vote	148,498	107,437	47,169
Percentage	48.58%	35.15%	15.43%
Mayor before election
Carter Harrison IV
Democratic Party
Elected mayor
Carter Harrison IV
Democratic Party

In the Chicago mayoral election of 1899, Democrat Carter Harrison IV was reelected, winning a plurality of the vote and defeating Republican nominee Zina R. Carter, former Illinois governor John Peter Altgeld, as well as several minor candidates by a double-digit margin.

The election took place on April 4.

Before the election, the two major parties held municipal nominating conventions to determine their nominees. At the Democratic Party's nominating convention, incumbent mayor Harrison was renominated by acclamation. At the Republican Party's nominating convention, Carter (a businessman, trustee of the Sanitary District of Chicago, and former alderman) defeated Graeme Stewart (a businessman and former president of the Chicago Board of Education).

== Background ==
=== Carter Harrison and John Peter Altgeld ===
Carter Harrison had been elected mayor in 1897. Harrison immediately became a major player in state and local politics, particularly within the Democratic Party. Like his father had attempted to before him, Harrison sought to create his own united party organization. He used patronage to his advantage. Many of his political allies were notorious and seedy figures such as "Bathhouse" John Coughlin and Michael "Hinky Dink" Kenna, both members of the so-called Gray Wolves. Harrison quickly had attracted the scorn of the city's proclaimed reformers.

Harrison's aspirations of power in the Democratic Party came in to conflict with former Governor John Peter Altgeld. Despite having lost his bid for reelection as governor in November 1896, Altgeld was a prominent national political figure, and had, since early 1896, held fragile control over Illinois' Democratic Party. Altgeld had been the most prominent Democrat in the state, and had strong advocacy of free silver and an obtained a pro-labor record as during his governorship. Altgeld held control over the state's Democratic Central Committee, and the committee's chair James Orr was largely a puppet of his. Altgeld also was supported by reformist Chicagoans, such as Clarence S. Darrow, Murray F. Tuley, and Edward Fitzsimmons Dunne. Altgeld also had loyal support from many labor leaders and Chicago politicians. As leader of the Illinois Democratic Party he had selected Harrison in 1897 to be the party-backed candidate for mayor. However, a divide between them arose shortly afterwards. Like Harrison, Altgeld also aspired to create a unified Democratic organization of his own. Thus, the two politicians became the heads of rival factions, not initially centered around ideology (each were pro-silver and had supported William Jennings Bryan), but rather centered around each of them as political personalities, and their quest for political power. The personal divide between the two was exacerbated by disagreements about the traction debate and whether or not municipal ownership was the solution to it. However, for a while both were able to keep their feelings about each other private. Harrison further upset Altgeld by, at the request of Tammany Hall, campaigning for the Democratic mayoral nominee in the 1898 New York City mayoral election, who was running against Altgeld's longtime friend Henry George. Their discontent with each other became public during an early 1898 dispute over when to schedule the state Democratic convention.

In March 1898, Harrison's allies, through ward-level victories in Chicago, gained control of the Cook County Democratic Party Central Committee. Harrison also, soon after, announced that he had negotiated a formal alliance with Tammany Hall leader Richard Corker, much to the preterition of Altgeld's wing of the party. In response, Altgeld would imply that Harrison was abandoning the cause of free silver (Tammany Hall had notably opposed it during the 1896 election cycle).

Another dispute that would arise between the two was over the election of the chairman of the Cook County Democratic Party. Harrison backed incumbent Thomas Gahan, while Altgeld, seeing an opportunity to undermine Harrison, backed Timothy Ryan's candidacy. Gahan would ultimately win a decisive victory.

=== Preceding 1898 elections ===
In 1898, Republicans swept both the Illinois state and Cook County elections. Republicans had been riding high off of the popularity that Republican President William McKinley, who was the beneficiary of public support following the nation's victory in the Spanish–American War. The only redeeming sign for Democrats was that, despite Republicans retaining control of the Illinois General Assembly, the Democrats had slightly increased their seat share.

Even before the war, McKinley had been popular in Chicago, receiving approximately 200,000 votes in the city for the 1896 United States presidential election.

== Nominations ==
=== Democratic primary ===
A primary was held in March to elect delegates to the city's Democratic convention. Harrison was renominated by acclamation at the convention held March 16.

=== Republican ===
Zina R. Carter won the Republican nomination.

Carter had previously served as an alderman in 1895 and 1896, resigning before the end of his term in order to take office as a member of the Board of Trustees of the Sanitary District of Chicago, on which he was still serving in 1899. He had also served as president of the Chicago Board of Trade in 1898.

At the city's Republican convention, Carter received 810 votes on the first ballot, against the 198 votes that Graeme Stewart received. After the first ballot, a motioned was carried to make Carter's nomination unanimous.

The Republican Party was seen to be divided, weakening its chances of winning the general election.

=== Municipal Ownership ===
In December 1898, after consideration, Altgeld made a widely anticipated announcement that he would challenge Harrison for the mayoralty. Realizing that he could not win the Democratic nomination, as Harrison had coalesced control of the city party, Altgeld opted to challenge him as a third-party candidate in the general election, backed by the Municipal Ownership League.

In announcing his candidacy, Altgeld justified his challenge to Harrison by laying blame for Democrats failure in the 1898 elections at the feet of Harrison, claiming that the results were in reaction to Harrison's failures.

== General election ==
Since Harrison was unopposed for the Democratic nomination and Altgeld was launching his own third-party label, the general election campaign technically took off before the Democratic convention had even taken place.

At the start of his campaign, there was little belief that Altgeld would actually win the mayoralty. His campaign advisor William Prentiss even stated in January that the actual goal of the campaign was to sabotage Harrison's chances, throwing the election to the Republicans. With Harrison removed from office, they believed that Altgeld would again be the undisputed leader of the state and local Democratic parties. By the end of the election, however, Altgeld was convinced that he would win the mayoralty.

In early January, with his campaign appearing to falter, Harrison was concerned by the threat of Altgeld potentially acting as a spoiler, and tried to appeal to Altgeld to withdraw by pledging to, in turn, take steps that would promote free silver in the state's politics. Altgeld immediately rejected Harrisons attempts at appeasing him. Harrison began to, out of what appeared to be desperation, solicit the endorsement and support of individuals such as Timothy Ryan, whose candidacy he had earlier opposed for Cook County Democratic Party Chairman. However, within weeks, the state of Harrison's campaign would appear to change, and his prospects would brighten up.

Altgeld accused Harrison of turning a blind eye to corruption and abandoning the reformist platforms he had campaigned on in 1897.

The traction issue took a prominent role in the campaign. Harrison accused Altgeld of being hypocritical on the issue, having ignored it while governor. Harrison also touted his success in defeating unpopular traction legislation. Altgeld accused Harrison of being a puppet of streetcar magnate Charles Yerkes. Algeld pledged to lower streetcar fares from five cents to four cents, and also pledged to push for immediate municipal ownership of street car lines. Harrison decried this as impractical.

Harrison eschewed discussing the national hot-button debate surrounding the gold standard. However, Altgeld took advantage of this issue, criticizing Harrison for his friendliness with several Gold Democrats.

Altgeld painted Harrison as an opponent of reform.

Harrison highlighted his successes in expanding street lighting in the city.

Starting in February, Altgeld began delivering public speeches to increasingly large and excited crowds. He also had a number of other orators campaign on his behalf across the city. However, among the orators that spoke on his behalf, there were only two major Democratic Party figures, William Prentiss and Clarence Darrow, with the rest of the orators dispersed across the city being lesser-known individuals. To keep up with Altgeld and his surrogates, Harrison and his allies also took a heavy schedule of stump-speeches.

Altgeld received backing from Georgist clubs and a number of labor organizations.

Republican nominee Zina B. Carter sought to run a positive campaign focused on returning business values to city government, and largely avoided attacking either Harrison or Altgeld. He was widely ignored in the press. He was also largely ignored by both Harrison and Altgeld. Carter aroused very little enthusiasm.

=== Endorsements ===
John Peter Altgeld (Municipal Ownership)

Officeholders

- Thomas Cusack, congressman
- Joseph S. Martin, city collector
- William Prentiss, lawyer and 1897 Democratic nominee for circuit judge

Individuals

- Clarence Darrow, lawyer and activist

Organizations

- Chicago Tammany Society
Carter Harrison IV (Democratic)

Officeholders

- John Maynard Harlan, former Chicago alderman and 1897 candidate for mayor
- J. N. C. Shumway, state senator

=== Results ===
Harrison won the election, become the first incumbent Chicago mayor to be re-elected since his own father won the 1885 mayoral election.

1899 Chicago mayoral election
Party	Candidate	Votes	%
Democratic	Carter Harrison IV (incumbent)	148,498	48.58
Republican	Zina R. Carter	107,437	35.15
Municipal Ownership	John Peter Altgeld	47,169	15.43
Socialist Labor	August Klenkie	1,175	0.38
Prohibition	John A. Wadhams	1,023	0.34
Social Democratic	T. G. Kerwin	367	0.12
Turnout		305,669	85

Harrison received 68.75% of the Polish-American vote, while Carter received 23.54% and Altgeld received 6.13%.

=== Allegations of electoral fraud ===
At least three of the city's newspapers published allegations of fraud in voting places across the city.

== Aftermath ==
Altgeld's loss diminished his position in Democratic politics.
