= Political boss =

Person who controls a faction or local branch of a political party

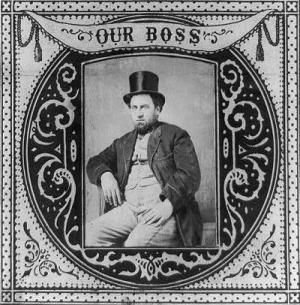
1869 tobacco label featuring Boss Tweed

A political boss or a party boss is a person who controls a faction or local branch of a political party. They do not necessarily hold public office themselves; most historical bosses did not, at least during the times of their greatest influence. Numerous officeholders in that unit are subordinate to the single boss in party affairs. Bosses may base their power on the support of numerous voters, usually organized voting blocs, and manage a coalition of these blocs and various other stakeholders. When the party wins, they typically control appointments in their unit, and have a voice at the higher levels.

Reformers typically allege that political bosses are corrupt. This corruption is usually tied to patronage: the exchange of jobs, lucrative contracts and other political favors for votes, campaign contributions, and sometimes outright bribes.

== History ==
In Spanish America, Brazil, Spain, and Portugal political bosses called caciques hold power in many places, while in Italy they are often referred to as ras. Bosses were a major part of the political landscape during the 19th and early 20th centuries in the United States, such as the political machines of Tammany Hall in New York City and the Choctaw Club in New Orleans, which controlled financing of campaigns and influence via owing of favors to arrange patronage public appointments.

In the Southern United States, charismatic populist politicians like Huey Long commanded large networks of supporters. Similar practices existed in the northern cities, particularly New York City, where Boss Tweed wielded control over the powerful Democratic political machine. In Denver, Colorado, during the 1890s Jefferson Randolph "Soapy" Smith operated as the Republican party boss and political fixer.

Charles Brayton exercised great influence over the politics of turn of the 20th century Rhode Island. He exemplified rural bossism within the Republican Party. Chicago had numerous colorful bosses, such as Democrats Hinky Dink and Bathhouse John, and Pat Marcy. Chicago's Republican counterparts included Big Bill Thompson, who became mayor in the 1920s. One of Chicago's most iconic figures was longtime mayor and chairman of the Cook County Democratic Committee Richard J. Daley, who had a major voice in state and national Democratic politics. With a few exceptions in the Southwest, such as Phoenix, most large cities of 100,000 or more in the early 20th century had machine organizations, and usually claimed one or more local bosses, most of whom were Democrats. Some had a major impact and hold on state politics, such as E. H. Crump in Memphis, Tennessee. A few bosses had reputations as reformers, such as Frank Hague of Jersey City.

Political bosses exist today. Politico in 2019 described insurance executive George Norcross as New Jersey's "most powerful unelected official", with "nearly uncontested control of South Jersey's Democratic machine". An October 2020 article in The Bulwark argued that Donald Trump's appeal to white working-class voters in the 2016 United States presidential election was driven by the same kind of paternalistic and localist mentality that was exploited by the Democratic political bosses of the early 20th century. An April 2022 New York Times article portrayed him as a modern party boss during his post-presidency.

== Characteristics and mechanisms ==
Political bosses exercised authority in a variety of ways, but particularly through mass mobilization of political supporters, particularly among immigrant populations. The boss maintained a hierarchy of street level organizers who reported to him directly so that he could coordinate election strategies and appoint people to certain municipal positions. This hierarchy allowed the boss to influence the selection of candidates, allocate resources however they saw fit, and shape policy decisions while not being a formal member of the government.

Patronage laid at the core of the boss's power. Once the political hierarchy was established in a city, the boss had near total control over the allocation of resources such as jobs, public work contracts, license distribution, and access to government services. These were distributed based on a person's loyalty to the party. Bosses would ensure that party members would remain loyal by giving them access to these programs and barring access from those that did not fall in line with the party. This was done because, in the early days of party machines, cities were often too burdened by financial strains to provide the majority of their citizens with basic public services, such as sanitation. Political bosses were capable of providing these services in exchange for political support.

Once bosses had gained this loyalty, they maintained their control and influence by maintaining a constant street presence. He did this by employing district leaders who would regularly meet face to face with constituents. They kept people informed on the party's activities and encouraged them to vote for the machine's preferred candidates, typically under the guise of a personal appeal. These operatives were expected to produce the results necessary, including votes from family and friends, for the party machine to maintain its control, or else they would be removed from their position. Bosses utilized this highly organized network of pay rolled vote makers to maintain control over city politics without having to stretch thin precious resources meant for direct patrons.

== Decline ==
Reform movements in the early twentieth century weakened political bosses considerably by reducing the capacity to maintain their patronage networks. Progressive reforms like direct primaries limited their ability to directly influence who was up for election, leading to machine unfriendly candidates gaining office. Once the boss's ability to distribute the rewards for loyalty was diminished, support for the bosses began to diminish as well.

As cities began to shift socially and economically, the bosses began to lose their largest base of support. Immigrant communities began to assimilate into the middle class and no longer relied on the machine for services. Their assimilation into native-born American culture changed what they expected from their local governments. Especially among the Irish, who initially held the belief that political support brought financial rewards, they began to value low taxation and homeowner based services instead. Without a poor and unassimilated urban support base, the political machine that bosses had carefully constructed began to lose its purpose.

Despite the loss of their initial supporters, the poor and unassimilated continue to exist in cities in different forms. So long as the need for services exist that city governments are either unable or unwilling to provide themselves, is it likely that the existence of political machines and bosses that control them will continue to exist in some capacity

== See also ==
- Corporatocracy
- Political corruption
