= Chicago Coliseum =

Arena in Illinois, United States

Coordinates: 41°51′43″N 87°37′30″W

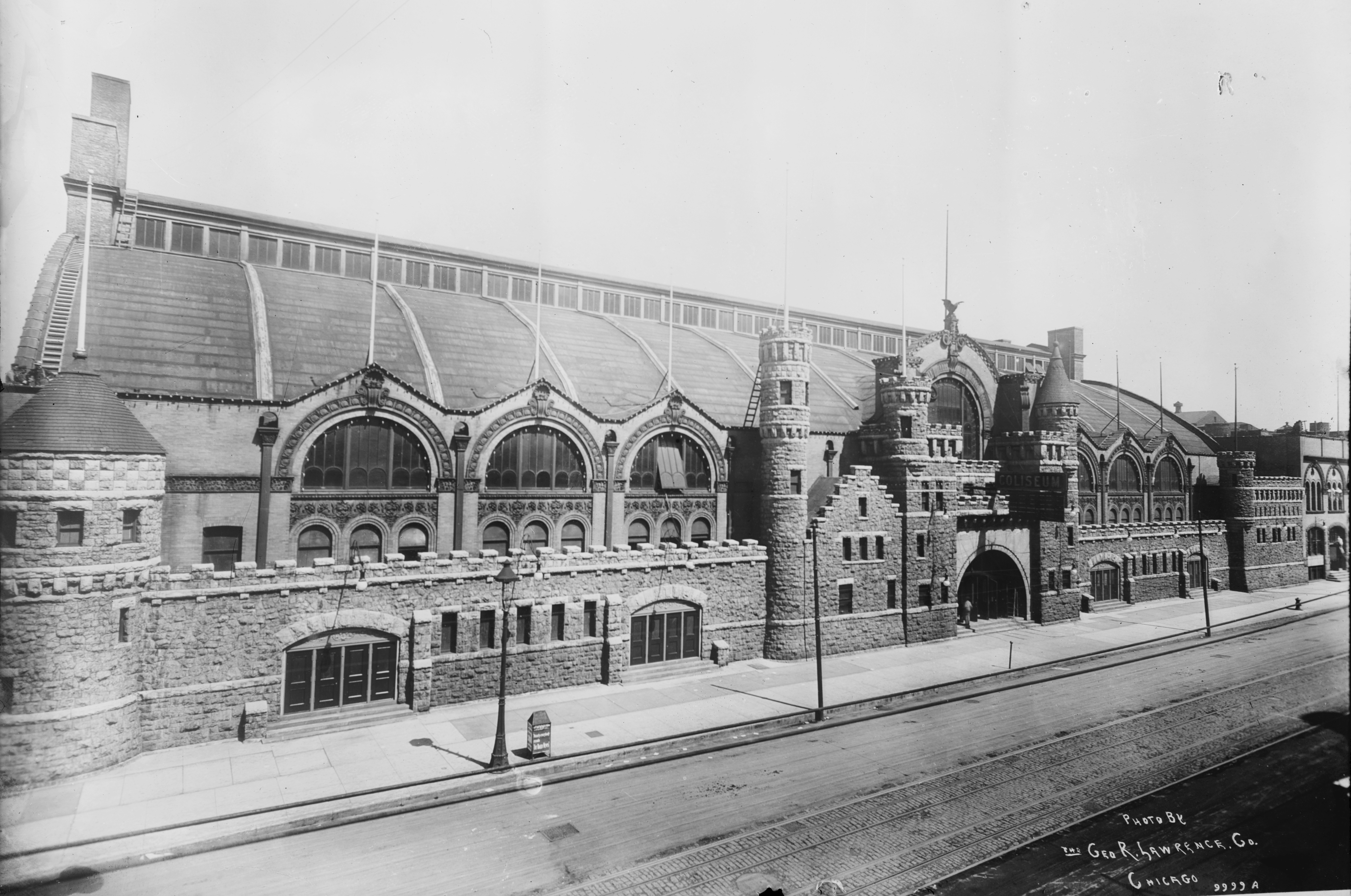
Exterior of the third Chicago Coliseum

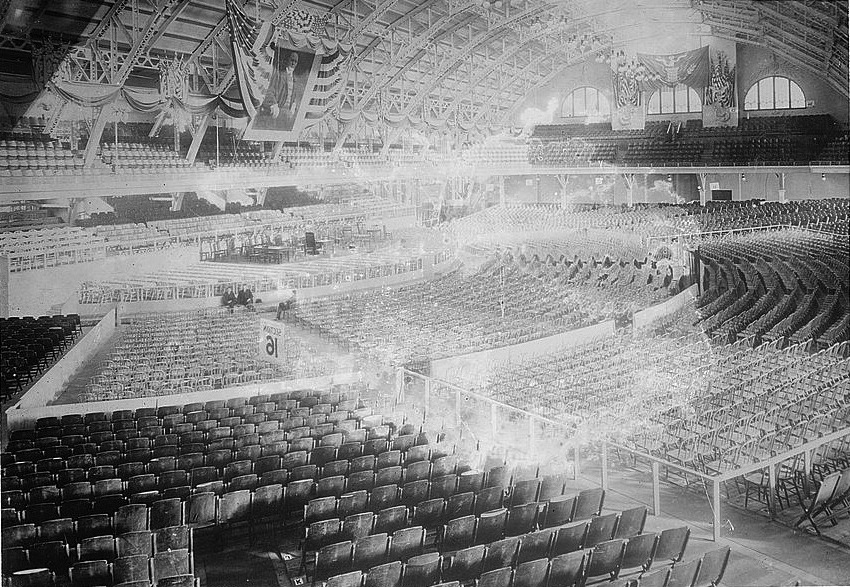
The third Chicago Coliseum during the 1904 RNC

Chicago Coliseum was the name applied to three large indoor arenas, which stood at various times in Chicago, Illinois, from the 1860s to 1982. They served as venues for large national conventions, exhibition halls, sports events, and entertainment.

The first Coliseum stood at State and Washington streets in Chicago's downtown in the late 1860s. The second venue was located at 63rd Street near Stony Island Avenue in the south side's Woodlawn community (near the site of the 1893 World's Fair). It hosted the 1896 Democratic National Convention (known for the "Cross of Gold" speech), and several early indoor American football games. After hosting a notable convention for the then new and growing bicycle industry, it burned a few months later.

The third Chicago Coliseum was located at Wabash Avenue near 15th Street on the near south side. It hosted five consecutive Republican National Conventions, (1904, 1908, 1912, 1916, 1920) and the Progressive Party National Convention in 1912 and 1916. It also hosted the Lincoln Jubilee in 1915. In the 1920s, it became a popular professional ice hockey venue, and hosted the world's first roller derby, during the Great Depression. The American Negro Exposition was hosted at the Coliseum in 1940. In the 1950s to early 1970s, the Coliseum served as a general admission venue for rock concerts, roller derbys, and professional wrestling matches. Generally closed in 1971, it was sold for redevelopment in 1982; however, portions of the building remained standing until the early 1990s. The Coliseum is commemorated in a public park named in its honor, across from its last site.

== History: the first Coliseum ==
The first Coliseum hosted horse shows, boxing matches, and circus acts beginning in 1866. Typical of most 19th century cities, Chicago had a flourishing bachelor subculture, which made events at the Coliseum often rowdy affairs. The arena's history is hazy as there are no accurate sources as to when it opened or closed.

== The second Coliseum ==
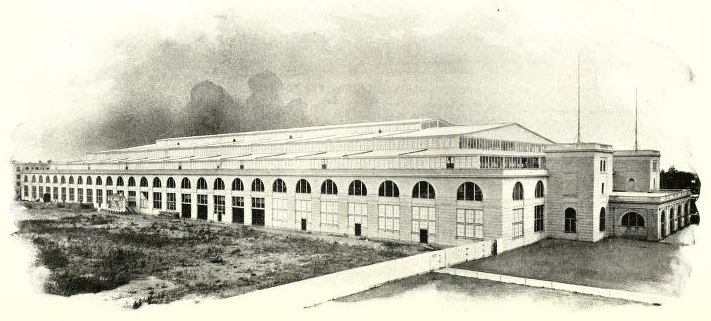
The second Coliseum

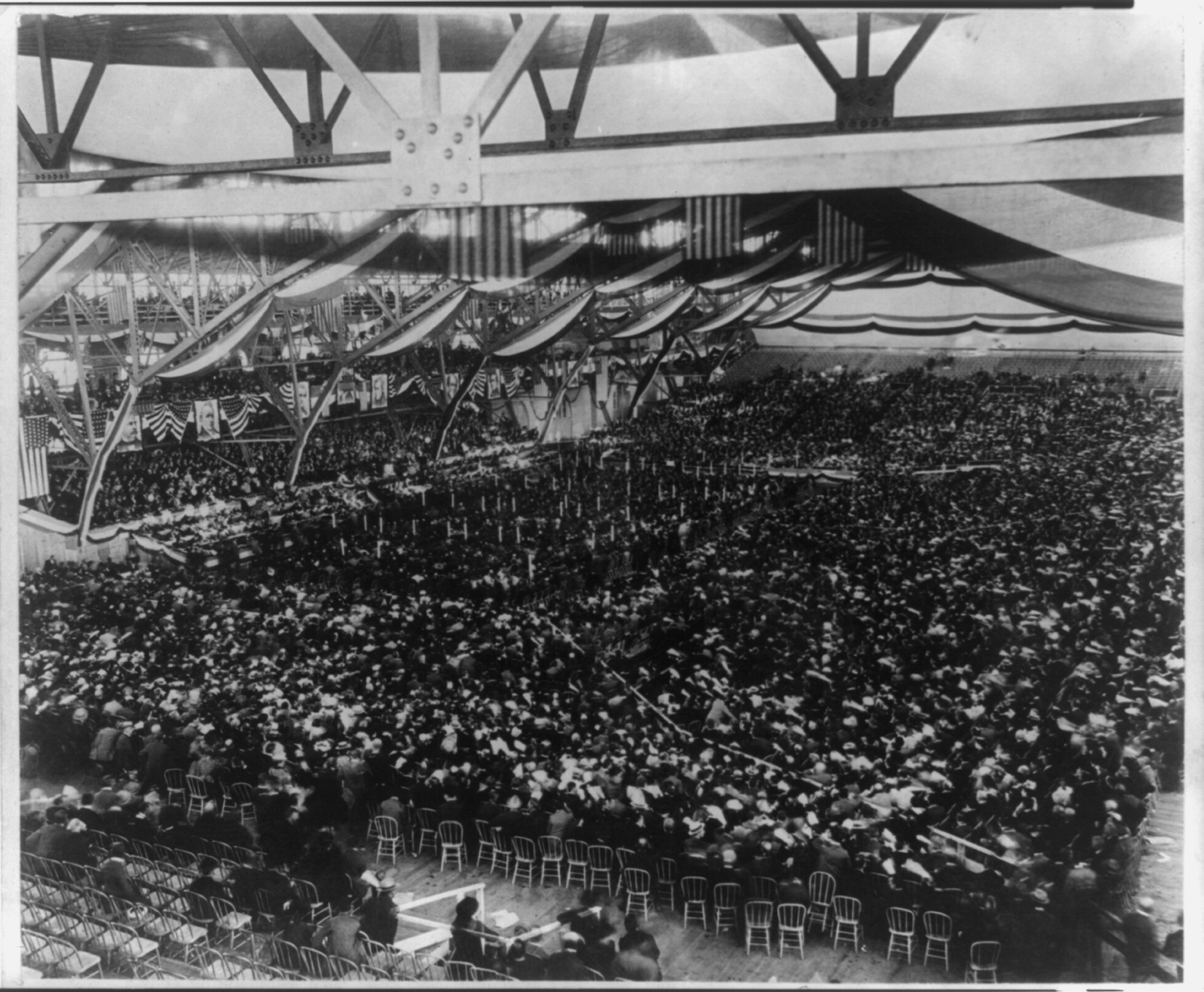
1896 Democratic National Convention

The second Coliseum, in the Woodlawn neighborhood on the city's south side, had a difficult history. Initial construction began early in 1895 on a 14-acre (57,000 m^{2}) site of the World's Columbian Exposition, but on August 22, the incomplete structure collapsed, and builders had to start over. Construction of the 300-by-700-foot (91 by 213 m) building entailed the use of 2.5 million pounds (1,100,000 kg) of steel, 3.2 million feet (980,000 m) of lumber, and 3 million bricks, and was finally completed in June 1896. The building was impressive in size for its day, twice as large as Madison Square Garden; its interior was supported by 12 massive arches, 100 feet (30 m) high with a span of 230 feet (70 m). The facility housed 7 acres (2.8 ha) of interior floor space.

Buffalo Bill's Wild West Show opened the facility, and in July 1896, it hosted the Democratic Party's national convention, which nominated for the presidency William Jennings Bryan; he famously electrified the crowd with his historic "Cross of Gold" speech. In October 1896 the Coliseum hosted the Barnum and Bailey Circus, the largest three-ring circus in the country.

College football teams immediately saw the feasibility of playing indoor games in the Coliseum, and four big games took place:

- University of Michigan vs. University of Chicago, Thanksgiving Day, November 26, 1896; won by Chicago, 7–6.
- Carlisle Indian School vs. University of Wisconsin, December 19, 1896; won by Carlisle, 18–8.
- Carlisle Indian School vs. University of Illinois, November 20, 1897; won by Carlisle, 23–6.
- University of Michigan vs. University of Chicago, Thanksgiving Day, November 25, 1897; won by Chicago, 21–12.

The Carlisle games represented the first time the Carlisle Indian School played in the Midwest. In 1896, 8,000 fans each attended the Chicago-Michigan and Carlisle-Wisconsin games, and in 1897, 12,000 fans attended the Carlisle-Illinois game and 10,000 showed for the second Michigan-Chicago game.

In January 1897, the Coliseum hosted one of the largest trade shows in the country, the annual Bicycle manufacturer's trade show. Another grand trade show took place in October, the Chicago Horse Show. The Coliseum by this time was hailed as a financial success. Besides football games, the facility hosted bicycle races, the Military and Athletic Carnival of the AAU, Buffalo Bill's Wild West Show, horse shows, agricultural exhibitions, and commercial trade shows.

On December 24, 1897, around 6:00 PM, during the Manufacturers' Carnival and Winter Fair, after many visitors had left the exhibit for supper, a fire caused by faulty electrical wiring broke out and swept through the building. Despite initial reports of numerous deaths, only one man died, a fireman (not a city fire fighter, but the facility's furnace man). The building was completely destroyed, primarily when one of the 12 arches supporting the roof fell over to bring down all the other arches like a row of dominoes. The fire consumed the building within 20 minutes. This massive structure, one of the greatest indoor facilities of the 19th century, had a lifespan of only 19 months.

== The third Coliseum ==
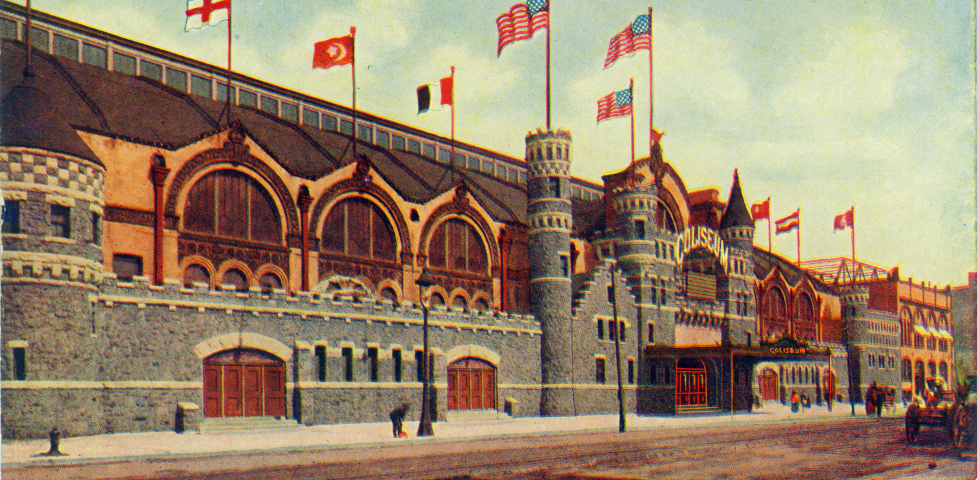
Coliseum Building Chicago (1910 postcard)

Third Coliseum

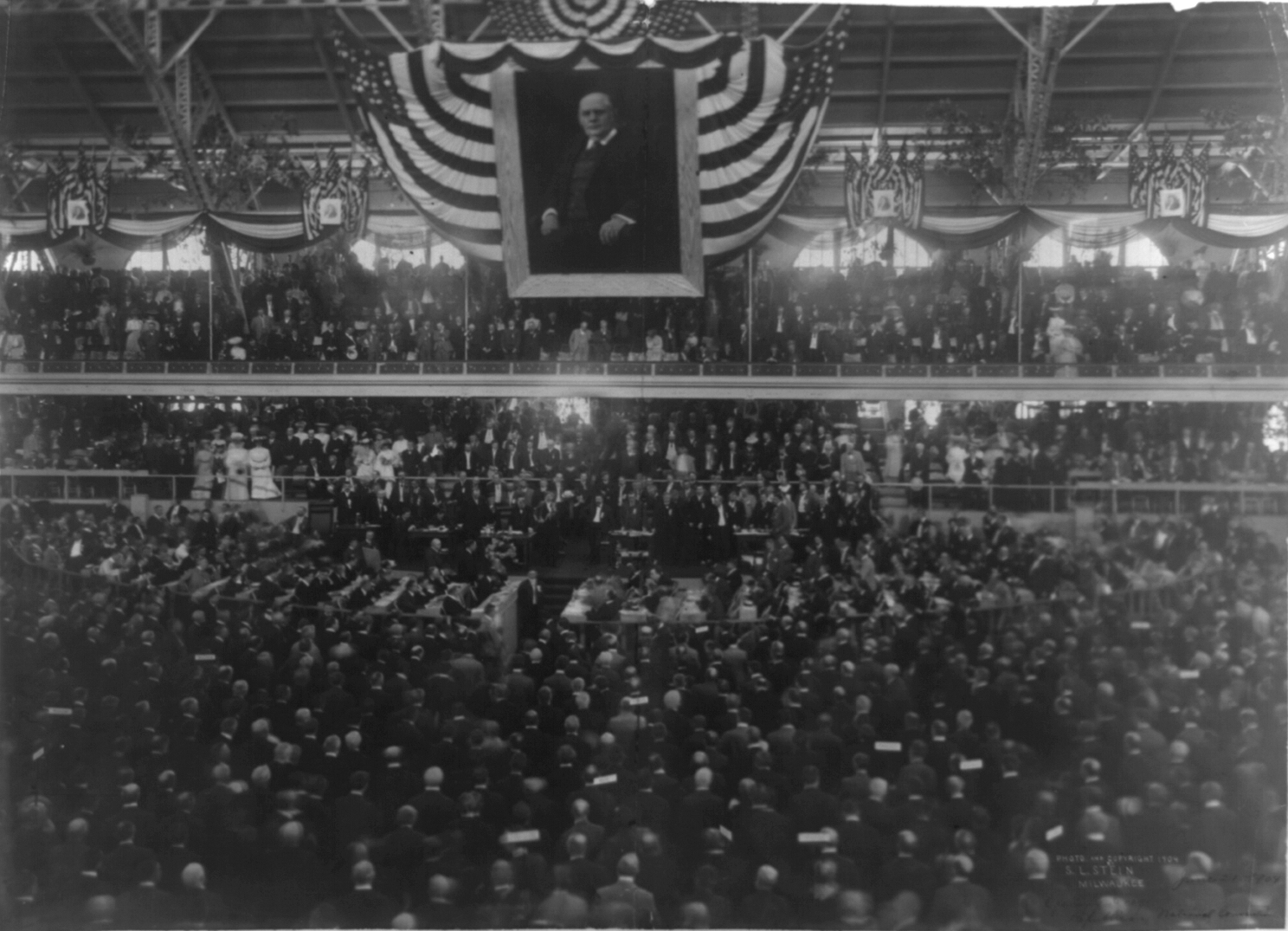
1904 Republican National Convention

1908 Republican National Convention

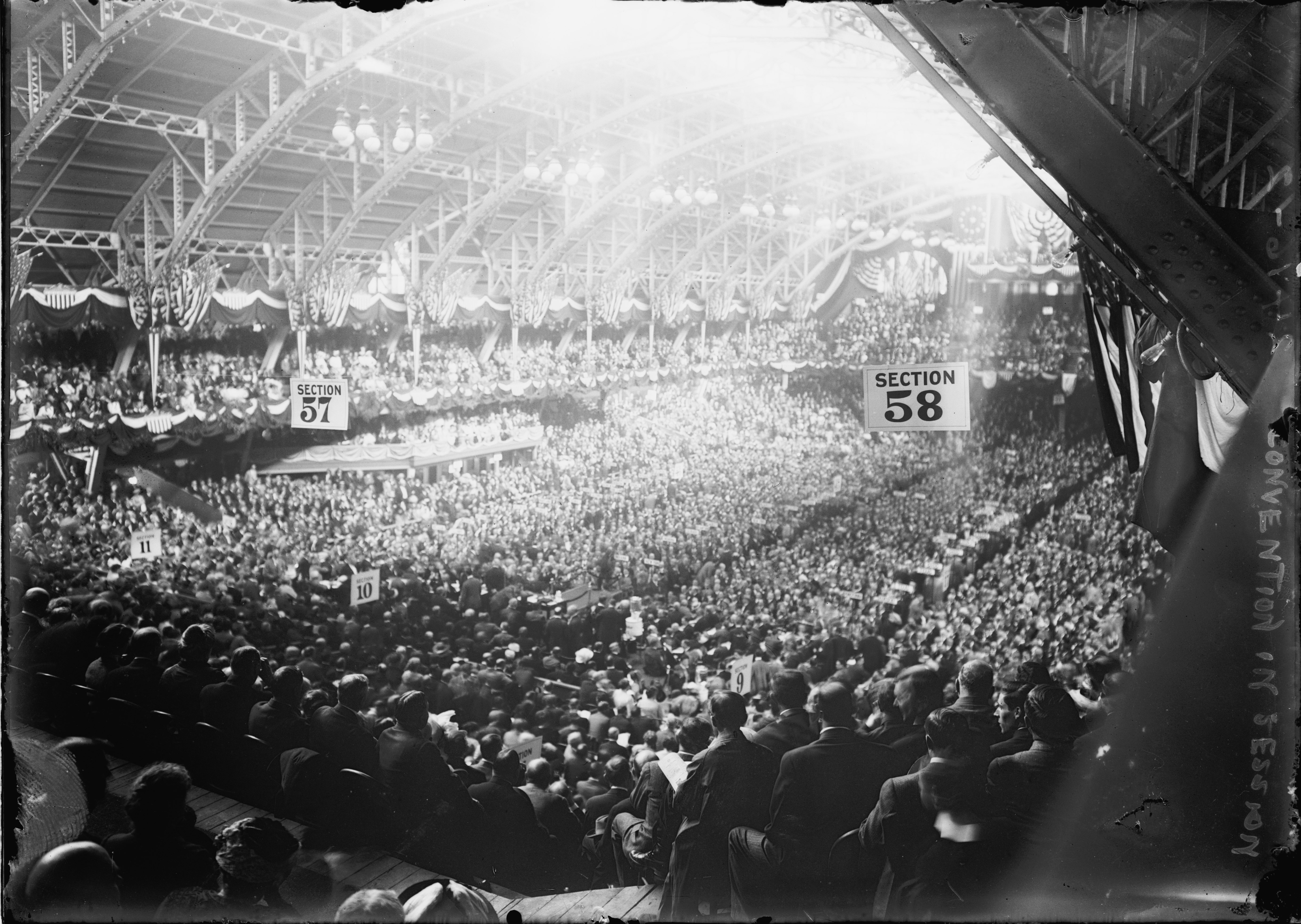
1912 Republican National Convention

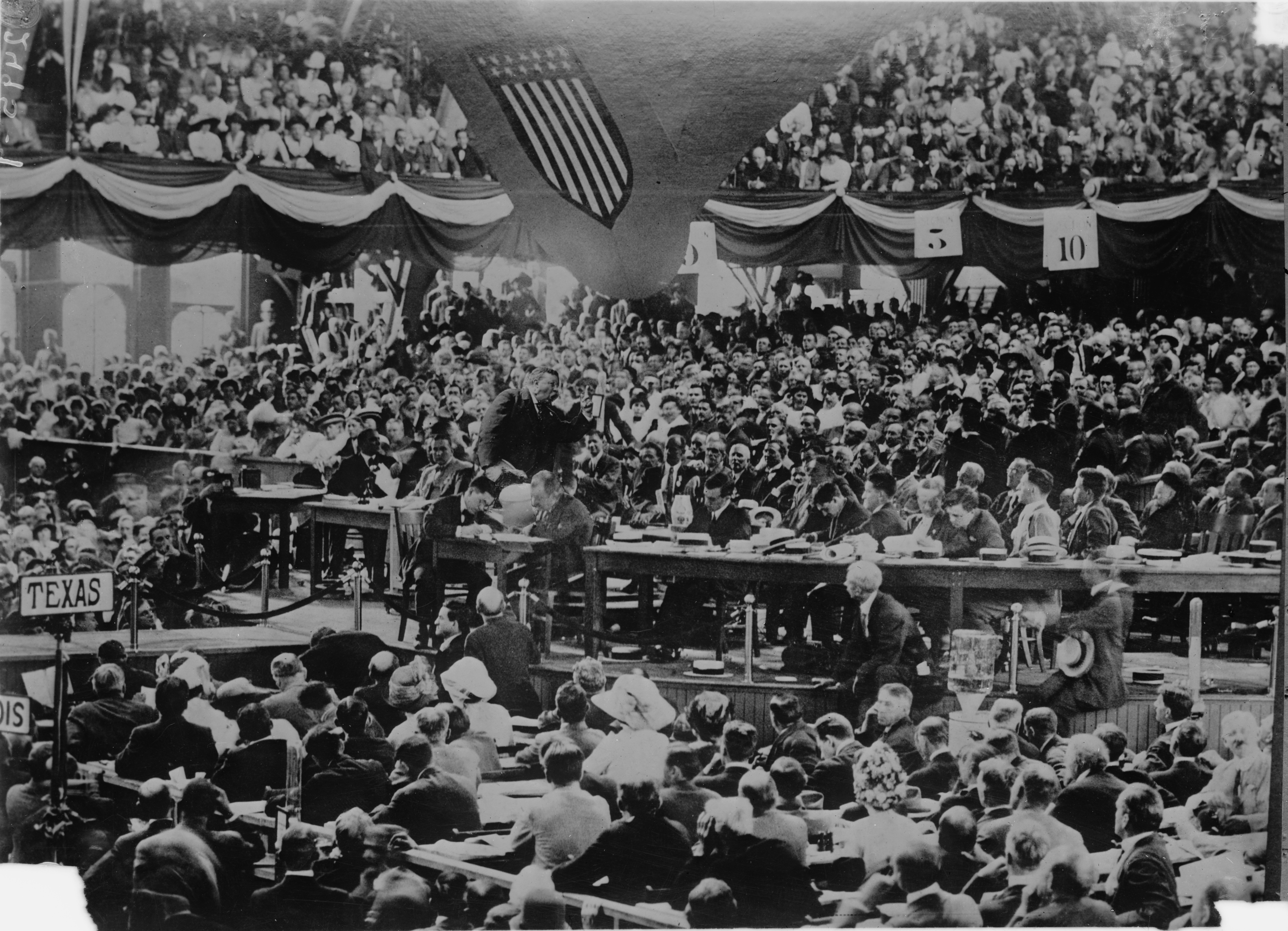
1912 Progressive National Convention

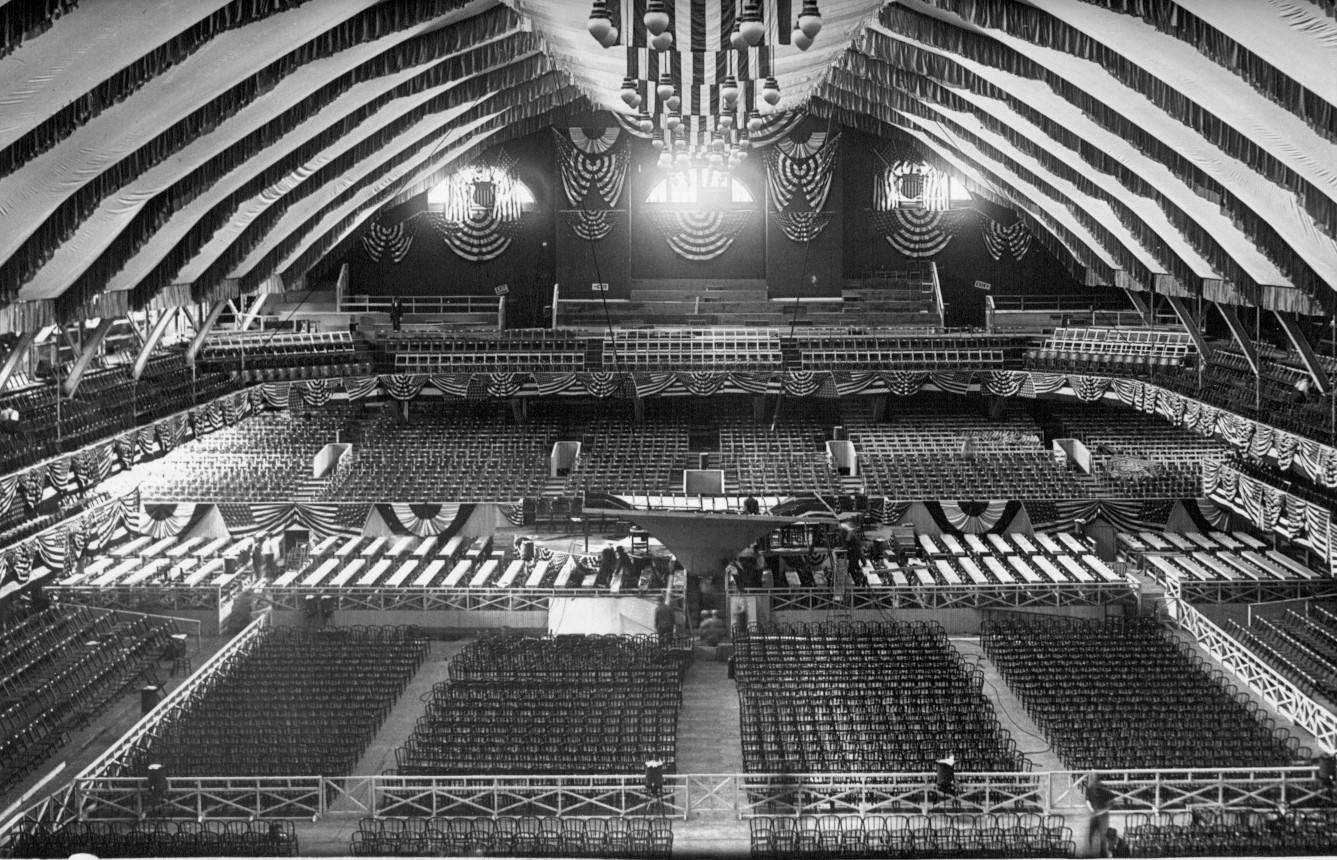
1916 Republican National Convention

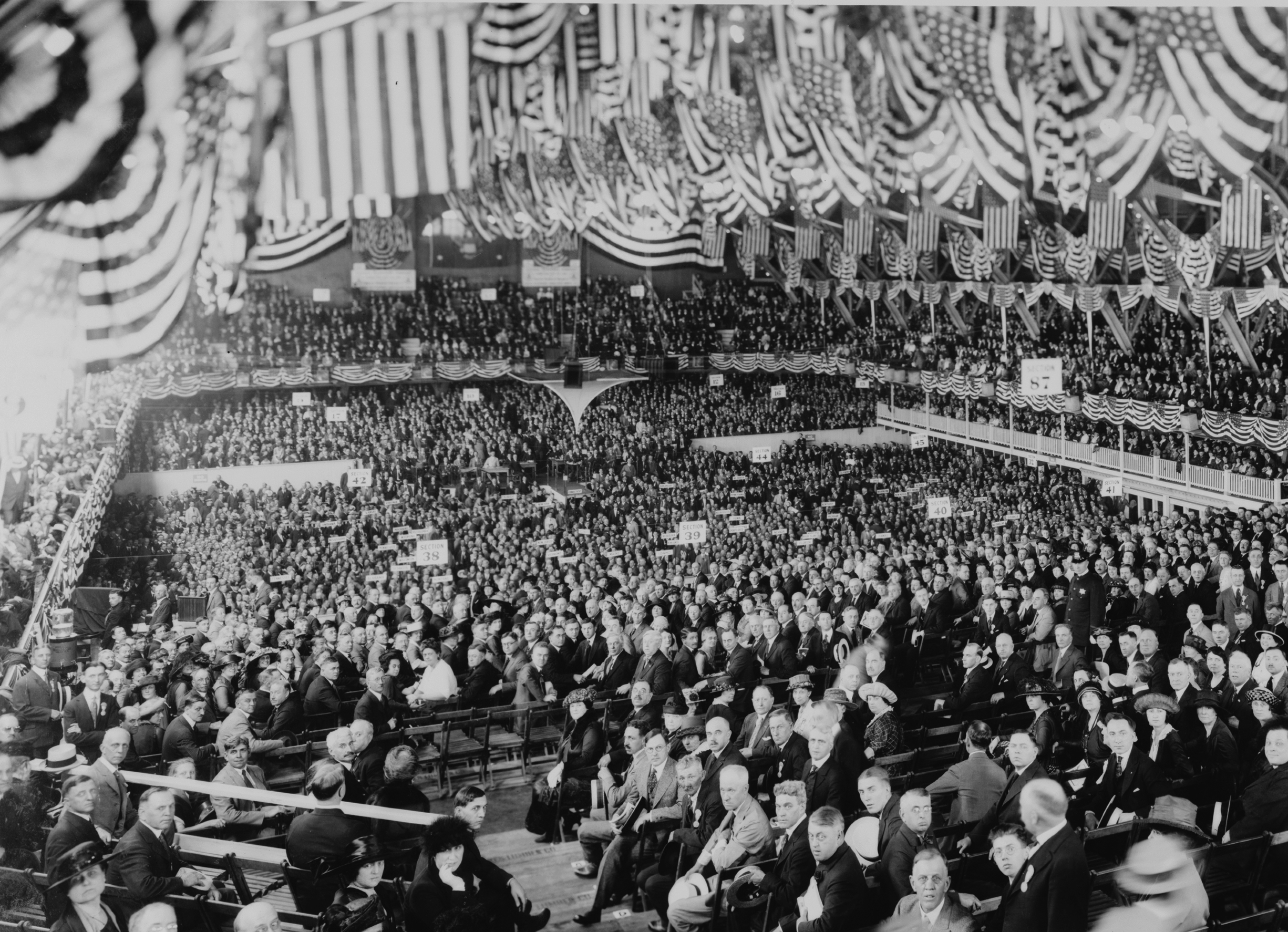
1920 Republican National Convention

Candy manufacturer Charles F. Gunther built the third Coliseum at 1513 South Wabash Avenue in 1899. He purchased Libby Prison, a structure in Richmond, Virginia, constructed as a warehouse which became a Confederate prison during the Civil War. Gunther had it dismantled, shipped to Chicago on 132 railroad cars, and rebuilt in 1889 as the Libby Prison War Museum, which displayed memorabilia from the Civil War. After about a decade the old prison was torn down again, except for a castellated wall that became part of the new Chicago Coliseum.

In January 1902, the Coliseum Garden Company procured a five-year lease from the Coliseum "to provide music and high class vaudeville entertainments" for the months of June, July, August and September.

Until 1908, the Coliseum hosted the notorious First Ward Ball, an annual political fundraiser for the two First Ward aldermen "Bathhouse" John Coughlin and Michael "Hinky Dink" Kenna – Coughlin and Kenna had been known as the "Lords of the Levee". Mayor Fred Busse was finally successful in halting the Ball in 1909.

From 1904 through 1920, this Coliseum hosted five consecutive Republican National Conventions, and the Progressive Party convention in 1912 and 1916.

During World War II, the army used the structure to house a radio training school which was previously in the nearby Stevens Hotel.

=== Ice hockey ===
In 1926, the Coliseum built an ice rink at the arena to support professional ice hockey. The Coliseum hosted the Chicago Black Hawks (today the 'Blackhawks') of the National Hockey League (NHL) from 1926–1929 with a seating capacity of 6,000. It was also the home of the Chicago Cardinals (later renamed Chicago Americans) of the American Hockey Association (AHA) for the season of 1926–27 and the Chicago Shamrocks of the AHA from 1931–32. In June 1928, fight promoter Paddy Harmon announced plans to construct Chicago Stadium, with the Black Hawks as the marquee tenants.

As the 1928–29 NHL season approached, the Stadium was not yet ready, and Black Hawks owner Major Frederic McLaughlin had had a falling-out with Harmon. Consequently, the Black Hawks arranged to continue playing at the Coliseum. However, they could only get ice time through January 1929; they played the remainder of their "home" games in Detroit, Michigan and in Fort Erie, Ontario, across the Niagara River from Buffalo, New York.

Although the Stadium was ready, the Black Hawks were back at the Coliseum as the 1929–30 season opened, unwilling to accept Harmon's terms. Harmon was deposed as president of the Stadium and in December the team began play at the Stadium.

In 1932, another dispute led the Black Hawks to return temporarily to the Coliseum, for their first three home games of the 1932–33 season. On November 20, the Black Hawks defeated the Montreal Canadiens, 2–1, in their final game on Coliseum ice. Canadiens superstar Howie Morenz was the last player to score an NHL goal at the Coliseum, assisted by Aurel Joliat and Johnny Gagnon, at 7:06 of the second period.

=== Other events ===
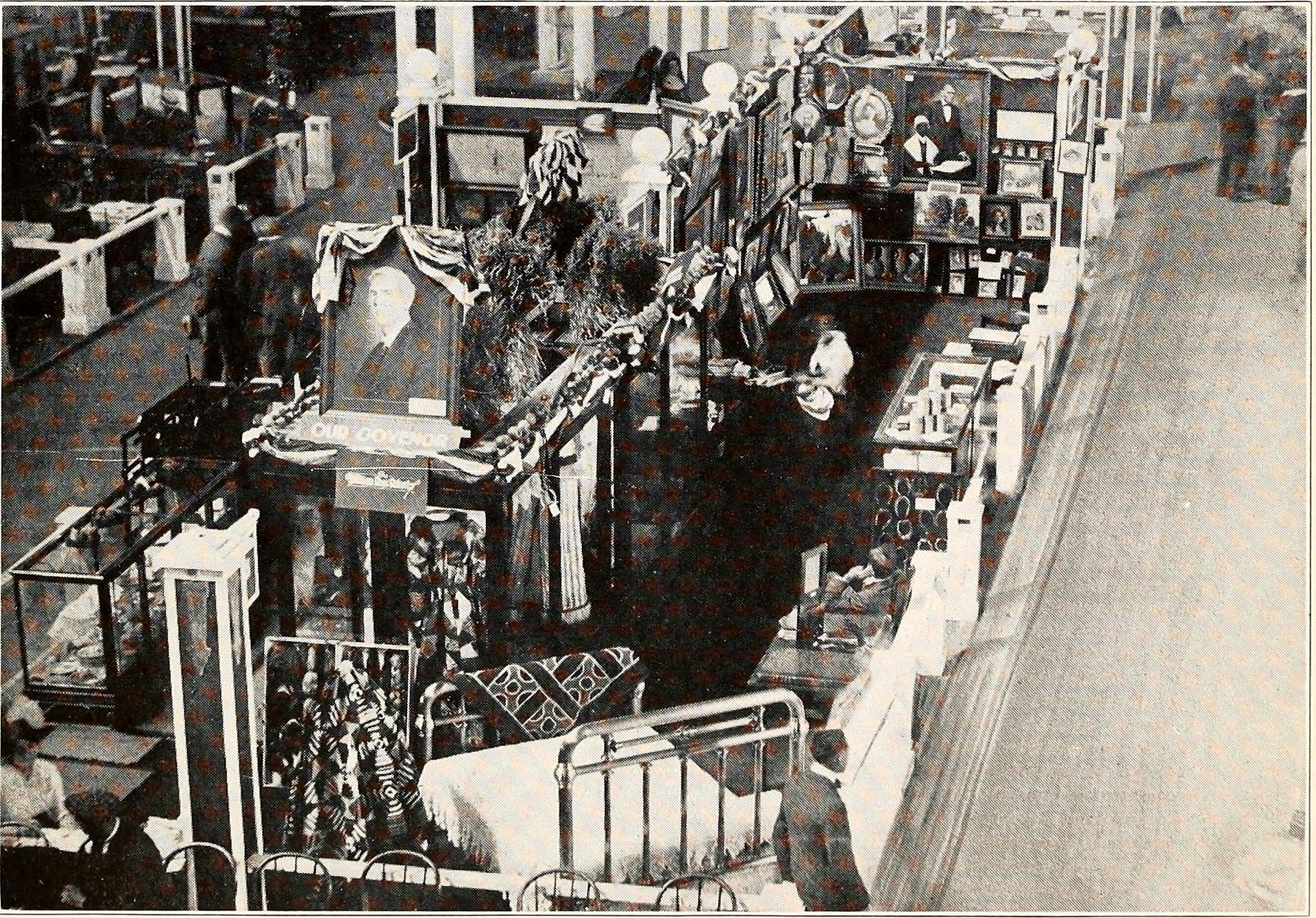
The Lincoln Jubilee in 1915

Over its history, the Coliseum featured a wide variety of other events that included the 1915 Lincoln Jubilee, which celebrated 50-years since the abolition of slavery in the U.S. (also, the 75th anniversary commemoration, the American Negro Exposition in 1940); sessions of the 28th International Eucharistic Congress in June 1926; bowling tournaments; professional wrestling bouts that included stars Gorgeous George and Angelo Poffo; circuses meetings of Black Muslims; Black Panthers and the last convention of the radical antiwar organization Students for a Democratic Society (SDS) in June 1969. On March 25 1967, civil rights leader Dr. Martin Luther King, Jr. addressed a 5,000 person rally in his first public speech against the Vietnam War.

With the ice hockey's Blackhawks gone and the Great Depression in full swing in the 1930s, use of the arena was limited. In 1935, promoter Leo Seltzer, drawing on the Depression-era popularity of roller skating, conceived the idea of a Roller Derby. In 1935, he staged the world's first Roller Derby at the arena. The event drew more than 20,000 people.

=== Refurbishing for the Chicago Zephyrs ===
The arena was re-furbished for use by the Chicago Packers, an expansion NBA team. Among the improvements was an increase of the seating capacity to 7,000. After playing their first season in the International Amphitheater, the Packers changed their name to the Zephyrs and moved into the Coliseum in 1962. In 1963 they moved to Baltimore and took the name Bullets. (Today they are known as the Washington Wizards). The NBA would return to Chicago with the Bulls expansion team in 1966, but the Bulls opted to use the International Amphitheatre and then Chicago Stadium as their home courts, so the Coliseum remained without a major tenant. The Bulls now play at the United Center.

=== The Syndrome ===
During the 1960s and early 1970s, many popular bands of the era played The Coliseum, including Cream (twice in 1968), Jethro Tull, The Jimi Hendrix Experience (December 1, 1968), The Doors (November 3, 1968) and B.B. King (May 16, 1970).

During 1970 and 1971, The Coliseum occasionally saw duty as "The Syndrome", a general-admission venue for rock music concerts. The inaugural concert was staged on Friday, October 16, 1970, featuring Humble Pie, Brethren, Chase, and the headline act, Grand Funk Railroad. Other bands that played The Syndrome included Rod Stewart and the Faces, The Grateful Dead, Steppenwolf, New Riders of the Purple Sage, Traffic, Ten Years After, Fleetwood Mac, Mountain, Alice Cooper, Siegel-Schwall Band, Mott The Hoople, and Savoy Brown.

On March 8, 1971, riots erupted at both The Chicago Coliseum and Chicago Amphitheater amongst fans attempting to watch a live, closed-circuit television broadcast of the Muhammad Ali – Joe Frazier fight being staged at Madison Square Garden in New York. When Coliseum projection equipment broke down, management asked an audience of 7,000 to leave just before the fight began. "[...] A group of youths, angered by the announcement [,] began tearing up ticket counters near the door and throwing them thru [sic] the front windows. Others, who had paid $10 a head to see the fight, began hurtling chairs and bottles from the balcony onto the main floor. An estimated 80 police were rushed to the Coliseum to restore order."

As a result of the damage, all scheduled concerts were cancelled with the exception of March 12, 1971, featuring James Taylor and Carole King.

On March 13, 1971, the city shut the building due to fire code violations, and it fell into disrepair. In 1982, it was sold for redevelopment and partially demolished; however, the planned construction never took place and large portions of the outer wall facing Wabash remained until the early 1990s when it was finally cleared. Part of the Libby facade was given to the Chicago History Museum. The site is now occupied by the Soka Gakkai USA Culture Center. Coliseum Park, located across Wabash Avenue on the site of the former Haven School at 14th Place and Wabash Avenue, commemorates the Coliseum.

== Bibliography ==
- Pruter, Robert. "Chicago's Other Coliseum." Chicago History Magazine. Spring 2012, pp. 44–65.

Events and tenants
Preceded by first arena	Home of the Chicago Black Hawks; 1926–1929	Succeeded by Chicago Stadium
Preceded by International Amphitheatre	Home of the Chicago Zephyrs; 1962–1963	Succeeded by Baltimore Civic Center
