= Lords of the Levee =

Book by Lloyd Wendt and Herman Kogan

Lords of the Levee: The Story of Bathhouse John and Hinky Dink
- First edition
- Author: Lloyd Wendt and Herman Kogan
- Language: English
- Subject: Political history, Politics
- Publisher: Bobbs-Merrill
- Publication date: 1943
- Publication place: United States
- Media type: Print (Hardback)
- Pages: 384

Lords of the Levee is a 1943 non-fiction book by longtime Chicago Tribune reporters Lloyd Wendt and Herman Kogan in one of three collaborations about the city of Chicago, focusing on its politicians "Bathhouse" John Coughlin and "Hinky Dink" Kenna, notorious alderman for the City of Chicago's lakeside First Ward. The book was reprinted in 1967 by Indiana University Press. In 1974, Indiana University Press published the book again under the title Bosses in Lusty Chicago, along with a new introduction by Illinois Senator Paul Douglas. The book appeared under its original title in 2005 when it was reprinted by Northwestern University Press.

== See also ==
- Gray Wolves of Chicago
