= John Coughlin (alderman) =

Former Chicago alderman

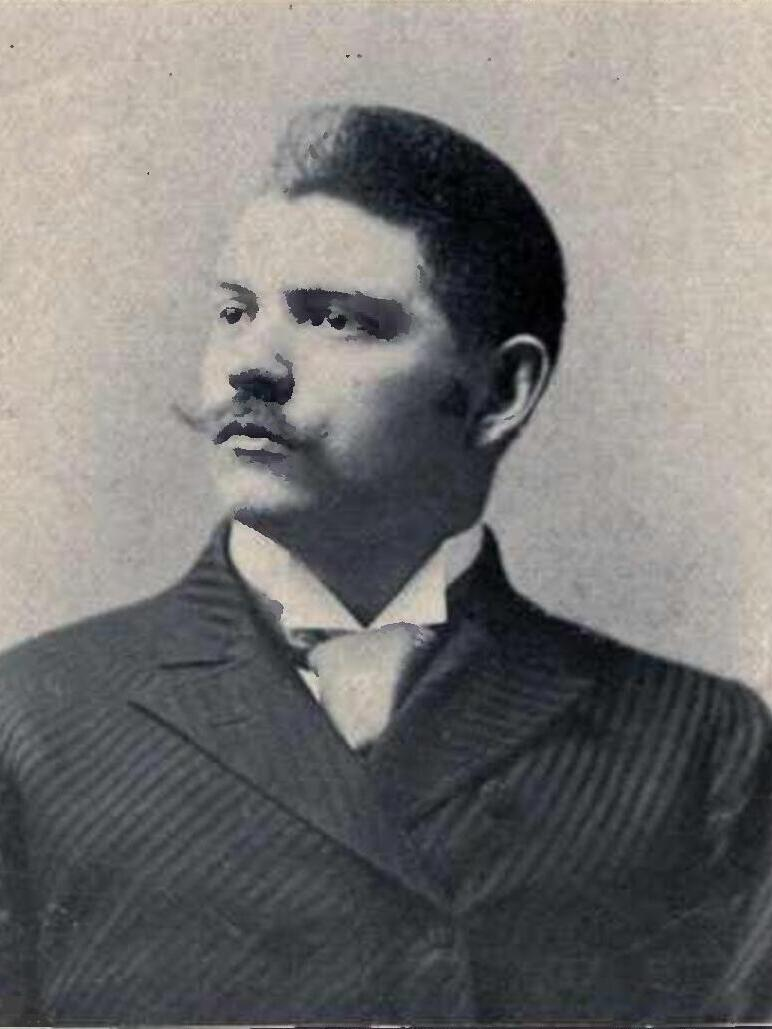
- Coughlin circa the 1890s

Alderman on the Chicago City Council from the 1st ward
- In office 1892 – November 11, 1938 Serving with John R. Morris (1892–1893); Louis I. Epstean (1893–1895); Francis P. Gleason (1895–1897); Michael Kenna (1897–1923)
- Preceded by: Nicholas A. Cremer
- Succeeded by: Michael Kenna

Personal details
- Born: August 15, 1860 Chicago, Illinois
- Died: November 11, 1938 (aged 78) Chicago, Illinois
- Resting place: Calvary Cemetery
- Party: Democratic

John Joseph Coughlin (August 15, 1860 – November 11, 1938), known as "Bathhouse John" or "the Bath", was an American politician who served as alderman from Chicago's 1st ward from 1892 until his death. Representing the Chicago Loop and in later years its environs, he represented what was often called the "world's richest ward". Alongside his partner, fellow 1st ward alderman Michael "Hinky Dink" Kenna, he controlled the ward for most of the first half of the 20th century.

A part of 1st ward politics for about 50 years, he was a charismatic and eccentric figure who was well-known across the city and adored by his constituents; he and Kenna constructed a machine that would last the better part of the 20th century. He was the longest serving alderman in Chicago history until November 2014 when his record was surpassed by Edward M. Burke of the 14th ward. Notoriously corrupt, he and Kenna led the "Gray Wolves", a group that attracted much scorn from reformers; he and Kenna in particular were notorious across the nation and globe. He and Kenna were known as the "Lords of the Levee" after the Levee vice district that provided them with funds and support in exchange for protection from law enforcement.

In addition to politics Coughlin was known for his outlandish fashion, eccentric poetry, and horse racing. His poetry and horse racing in particular would come to dominate the later part of his life; his horse-racing interests increasingly drained his money, which his horses failed to recoup at the racetrack, and he died penniless.

== Early life ==
John Joseph Coughlin was born August 15, 1860 in Chicago to Johanna (née Hanley) and Michael Coughlin. Michael, a native of County Roscommon, had come to the 1st ward in 1857, and owned a moderately-successful grocery at Polk and Wells before it burned down in the Great Chicago Fire. Coughlin never seemed concerned about the poverty the fire caused his family, remarking:

Why, money didn't mean anything to me. I'm glad that fire came along and burned the store. Say, if not for that bonfire I might have been a rich man's son and gone to Yale—and never amounted to nothing!

Coughlin acquired his nicknames as a result of working in a bathhouse as a masseur. Eventually he was able to purchase a tavern and several bathhouses of his own.

== Political career ==
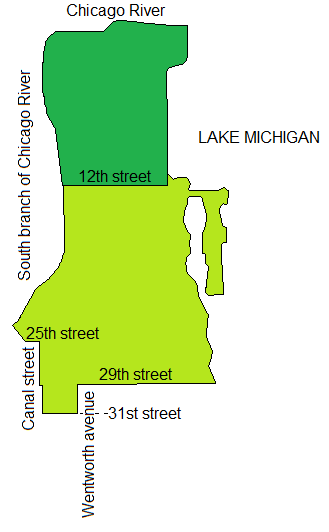
Boundaries of the 1st ward in 1892 1938

Coughlin's tenure was marked by a large amount of corruption, in which he, Kenna, and 19th ward alderman Johnny Powers led the Gray Wolves, a group of notorious aldermen. In the late 19th century Chicago would award franchises to private companies for construction of such utilities as gas and public transit, the latter of which would prove contentious in Chicago. Businesses seeking such lucrative contracts would bribe and otherwise work with the aldermen in a practice known as "boodling". Such antics ultimately led to the creation of the reform organization Municipal Voters' League to run and endorse candidates in opposition to the Gray Wolves. Despite being almost invariably excoriated by the Municipal Voters' League Coughlin himself was re-elected 19 times and never defeated, running unopposed in his last four elections. Indifferent if not enthused about his reputation for corruption, upon being accused of corruption he demanded a retraction not for the charge of graft but for the claim he was born in Waukegan.

=== Entry into politics ===
Coughlin was elected alderman as a Democrat from Chicago's First Ward on April 5, 1892 despite having no prior experience in public service. (Note: Reference incorrectly states Coughlin's age at election as 35.) Coughlin and his partner, fellow First Ward alderman Michael "Hinky Dink" Kenna, were known as the "Lords of the Levee", a district which was part of their ward. The Levee was known as being a vice-ridden section of Chicago and home to many saloons, gambling dens, prostitutes, pimps, and flop houses.

=== 1890s ===
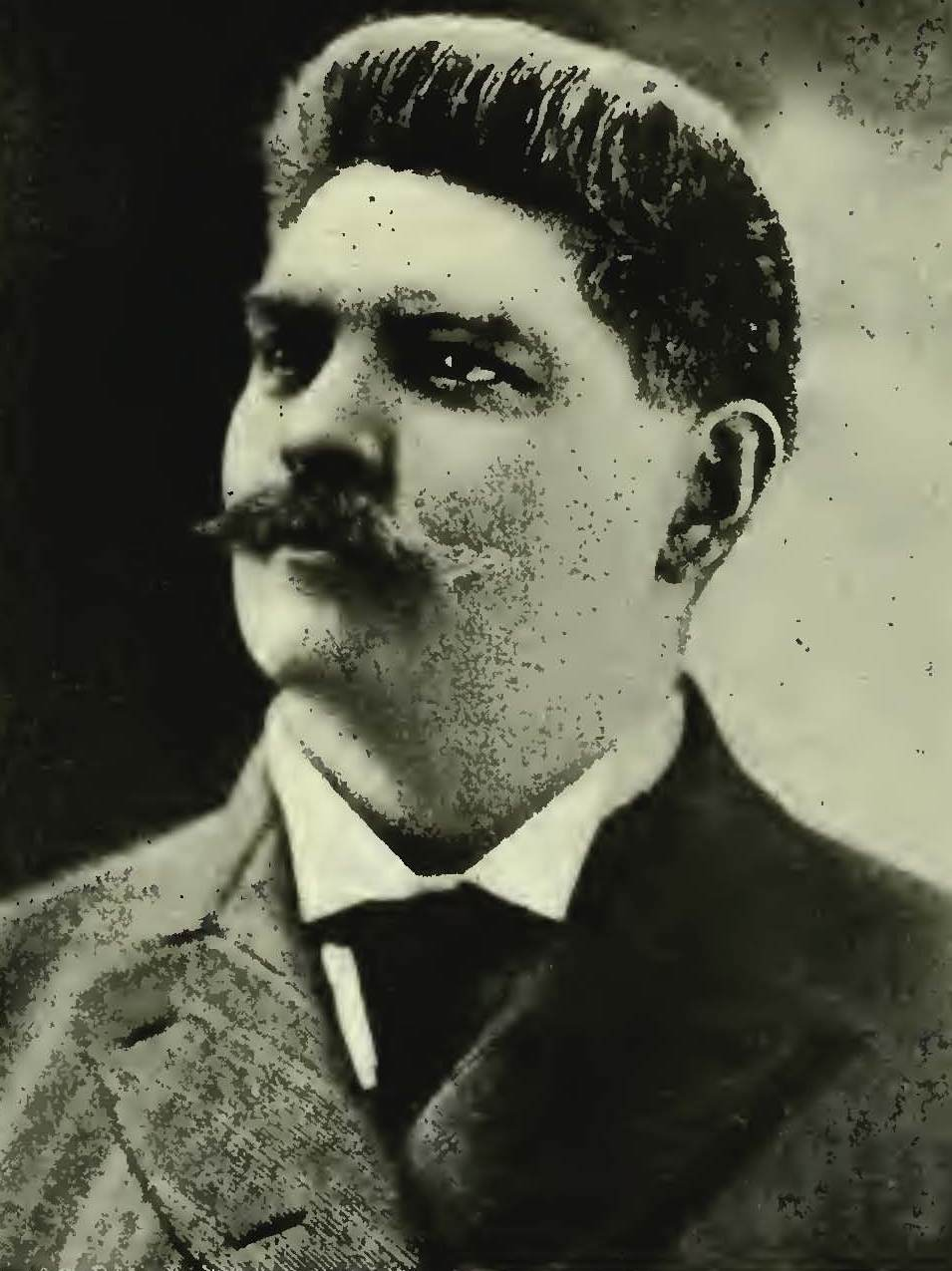
Coughlin, circa the 1890s

In 1894 Coughlin was unanimously nominated as the Democratic nominee in what Lloyd Wendt and Herman Kogan would later call "the briefest political convention in Chicago's history" and was reported by the Chicago Herald as lasting "only a few minutes as the delegates were in a hurry to get away to attend a prize fight." However, rival Billy Skakel, who specialized in offering and soliciting gambling on fraudulent stock quotations and hated Coughlin for allowing local Prince Hal Varnell to cut into his turf, formed his own Independent Democratic Party. Working with Sol van Praag, who had ambitions of his own to rule the 1st ward, he ran as a rival to Coughlin for the race and was endorsed by such publications as Mixed Drinks: The Saloon Keepers' Journal. Fearing for his career despite Kenna's insistence that he would win, Coughlin visited Mayor John Patrick Hopkins, who unsuccessfully asked Skakel to withdraw from the race. Coughlin then presented a petition to get Skakel's name removed from the ballot, which was initially accepted by the election board but would later be overturned by a local judge and backfire on Coughlin. Nevertheless, Kenna reassured Coughlin of victory and used his organizational skills to bribe the homeless with fifty cents, as much food as desired, and a place to stay for each voter.

Kenna also suggested that Coughlin visit Hopkins once again and remind him of how the duo had helped him. After Hopkins once again pled with Skakel to withdraw to no avail, he ordered the police department in the 1st ward to detain any Skakel supporters seen and to close any saloons supporting Skakel immediately at midnight. Kenna also recruited members of the notorious Quincy Street gang to protect any voters of Coughlin, noting that the police would ignore any tactics used to that effect, preceding von Praag, who had had a similar idea, by a few hours.

Coughlin would win the election with 2,671 votes while independent Republican J. Irving Pearce received 1,261 and Skakel received 1,046. The tactics used in the election received much scorn in the press, with the Chicago Tribune writing that "Bathhouse John's election was secured by methods which would have disgraced even the worst river parishes of Louisiana," but neither Coughlin nor Kenna cared about such reception.

Kenna ran for alderman in 1895, but van Praag and Skakel took vengeance for the events of 1894 and with the help of a controversial franchise to the Ogden Gas Company aided Republican candidate Francis P. Gleason to defeat him. Coughlin retaliated for the loss by introducing an ordinance banning fighting in the city the night before van Praag had a gloved fight scheduled in the ward. Although the ordinance had passed but was found to not be able to stop the fight, the previous ordinance banning only bare-knuckled fighting was argued by attorneys to be able to stop the fight, and Coughlin arranged for the top fighters to be arrested immediately before the semifinals. Knowing of the impending police intervention the fight's manager called it off, damaging the Skakelites' credibility.

The 1895 elections had produced a Republican mayor and a Republican majority in the City Council, both of whom Charles Tyson Yerkes would fight in his efforts to construct the Loop during the Chicago Traction Wars. Kenna, recouping his forces in preparation for the 1897 race, saw that Coughlin would serve as a vital tool for Yerkes, and arranged for an alliance between him and Powers. As the 1st ward contained the locations of most of the targets of boodling, including the Loop, Coughlin found himself sponsoring most of the corrupt measures. However, Powers had betrayed Coughlin by December, collaborating with Yerkes and the Republican majority to the exclusion of Coughlin and introducing most of Yerkes's ordinances. Coughlin and Kenna took their revenge on Powers by defeating his bid for the chair of the Cook County Democratic Party Central Committee in favor of free silverite Tommy Gahan. Emboldened by this victory Coughlin introduced an ordinance to grant the General Electric Company a streetcar franchise that included Jackson Street, a valuable street that would fetch a high price from Yerkes, passing the ordinance over Mayor George Bell Swift's veto.

Kenna unseated Gleason in 1897 to take office in the City Council, alongside Carter Harrison Jr. for the mayoralty. In the meantime Yerkes had tired of buying streets individually in the city and wanted to go to the Illinois General Assembly in order to get the State to grant him franchises across the City. This united the reformers, who felt that the City was being deprived of tax dollars, and the corrupt aldermen, who saw their sources of profit vanish, to oppose Yerkes's efforts. Harrison was the leader of this opposition, but while he made Coughlin his leader in the Council he felt as if reformers were better suited to directly attack Yerkes. He decided to make Coughlin the leader of opposition of a bill in the General Assembly to allow the seven gas companies of Chicago to merge into one and form a monopoly. In such capacities Coughlin won some begrudging admiration from the reformers, although he did not fully believe in reform.

=== First Ward Ball ===
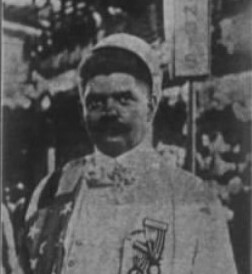
Coughlin attending the 1900 Democratic National Convention

Coughlin and Kenna were also the hosts of the First Ward Ball, an annual political fundraiser which brought together safecrackers, sex workers, gangsters, politicians, businessmen, gamblers, and a variety of other types. The event raised more than $50,000 a year for the two First Ward aldermen until it was closed down in 1909 by Mayor Fred Busse. By the time it was banned, the ball was so large that it had to be held in the Chicago Coliseum, the city's major convention center. Besides its notoriety in attracting many unsavory characters it often ended with the police having to curb disorderly conduct bordering on rioting.

=== 1914 Challenge by Marion Drake ===
In 1914 local suffrage for women in Chicago elections portended a possible shift in city power, by woman candidates and women's votes. Coughlin was strongly challenged by Marion Drake, an attorney and legal secretary. Despite local Chicago and nationwide attention to the race, Coughlin again held the alderman seat.

=== Prohibition ===
In 1923 the number of aldermen a Chicago ward was entitled to was reduced from two to one, in concert with the number of wards being increased from 35 to 50. Kenna stepped down in favor of Coughlin after this change, but remained as 1st ward committeeman.

Coughlin was opposed to Prohibition, introducing a motion in the Council to praise New York Governor Al Smith for repealing the law enforcing Prohibition and encouraging Illinois to do the same. In anticipation for the ratification of the 21st amendment he introduced an ordinance providing for the licensing of liquor. The Berghoff in his ward was the first bar in Chicago to receive a liquor license after Prohibition was repealed.

=== Later career ===
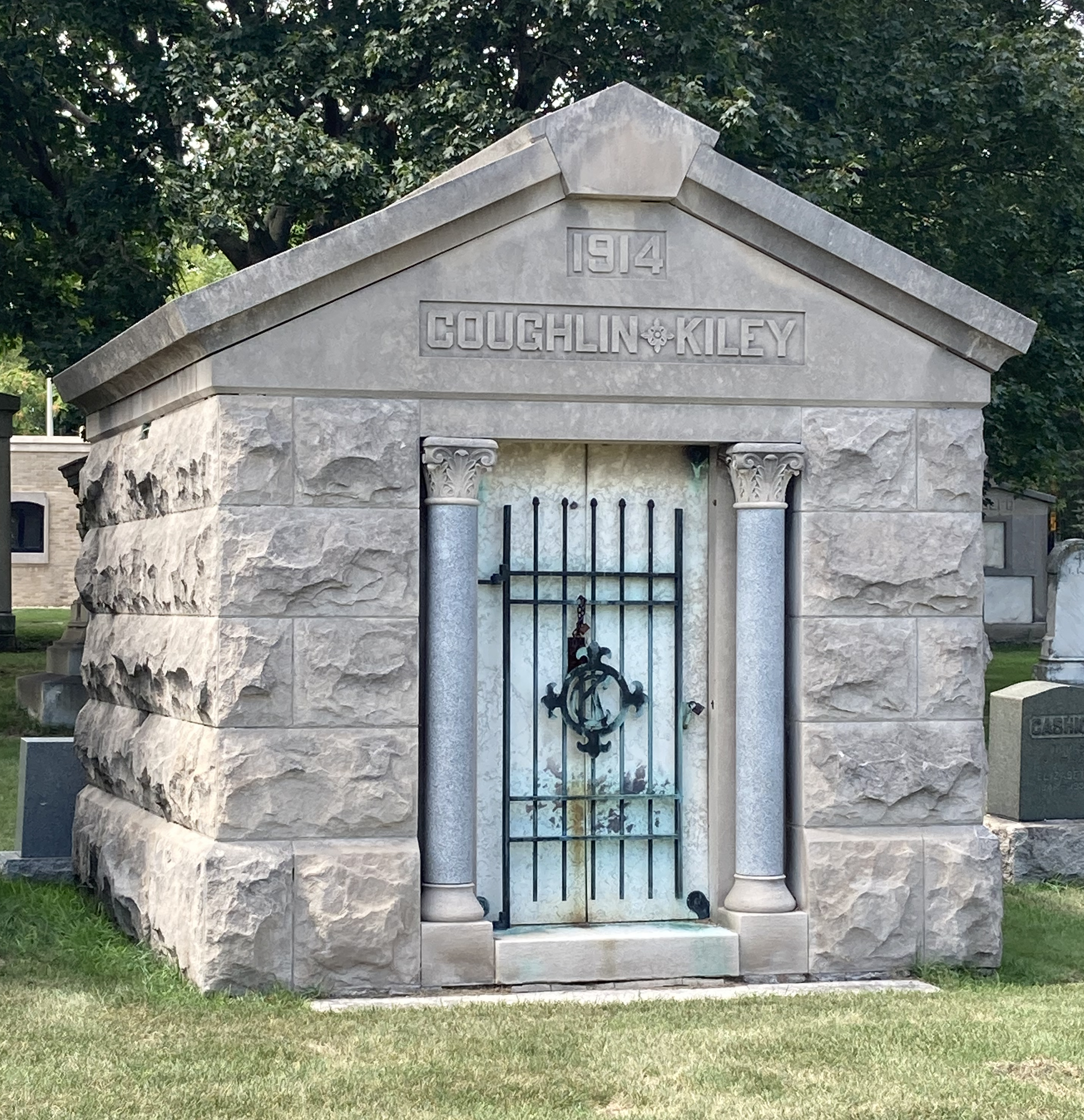
Coughlin-Kiley mausoleum at Calvary Cemetery

By 1933 a report on Coughlin's unopposed run in that year's aldermanic election by the Associated Press described him as a "Vestige of a past era" and "the epitome of a vanishing [type of] American". At that time the longest-serving municipal legislator in the country by his own estimate, he decried that Council business distracted him from his poetry.

After 46 years as alderman of the First Ward, Coughlin died in office at age 78 of pneumonia at Mercy Hospital in Chicago on November 11, 1938. He was buried at Calvary Cemetery in Evanston.

After a vacancy in the position Kenna would be elected unopposed to assume the office of 1st Ward alderman. Coughlin's death had caused a surge of factionalism within the 1st ward, and Kenna was thought to be the best candidate to ensure peace.

== Personal life ==
Coughlin was an eccentric figure in Chicago politics, known for his erratic behavior, flashy fashion, poetry, and horse racing. His boisterous personality and large figure often stood in contrast to the comparative meekness and small stature of his partner Kenna. When Harrison asked Kenna whether Coughlin was crazy or on drugs, Kenna replied that "John isn't dotty and he ain't full of dope. To tell you th' God's truth, Mr. Mayor, they ain't found a name for it yet."

=== Fashion ===
Having grown up in poverty, Coughlin liked to dress himself in ostentatious fashions, often contracting the services of costumers for vaudevillian actors. He was known to prefer bright colors.

=== Poetry ===
Coughlin was known for his poetry, which was often considered of dubious quality. Such was his infamy in poetry that it was common practice for Chicagoans to pen doggerel and facetiously credit it to Coughlin, a practice he allowed.

One of his poems, known as "Dear Midnight of Love", was penned during a vacation in Denver. Coughlin set the poem to music and had the daughter of a friend sing it after Emma Calvé refused, performing it at the Chicago Opera House on October 8.

=== Horses ===
Coughlin was known for his endeavors in horse racing, and was often successful in it. Ultimately, however, they failed and he died penniless.

=== Colorado Springs ===
Coughlin opened Zoo Park in Colorado Springs, Colorado, in 1906. He had first vacationed in Colorado Springs in 1900 and fell in love with it, spending most of his summers there. One of the main attractions of Zoo Park was an elephant named Princess Alice, which had been granted from Chicago's Lincoln Park Zoo after Coughlin convinced his fellow aldermen that owning another elephant was a waste of taxpayer money. However, the rise of reformers dried up Coughlin's Chicago revenue, and combined with declining attendance at Zoo Park and the destruction by fire of Coughlin's summer residence in 1914 his stay became more difficult, and he ultimately left Colorado for good upon its passing of Prohibition.

== Legacy ==
A 2012 retrospective by NBC News Chicago ranked Coughlin and Kenna as the 3rd and 4th most corrupt public officials in Illinois history, behind William Hale Thompson and Paul Powell.

The last surviving link to Coughlin and Kenna was Anthony C. Laurino, who had served as an assistant precinct captain under their tutelage and later serve as alderman of the 39th ward from 1965 to 1994, dying in 1999.

The 1st ward continued its corruption throughout the 20th century until it was moved north in 1993 and the Loop and areas divided among several wards.

== See also ==
- List of Chicago aldermen since 1923

== Bibliography ==
- Fremon, David K. (1988). Chicago Politics Ward by Ward. Bloomington, Indiana and Indianapolis, Indiana: Indiana University Press. ISBN 0-253-31344-9.
- Wendt, Lloyd; Kogan, Herman (1971). Bosses in Lusty Chicago (a.k.a. Lords of the Levee). Indiana University Press. ISBN 0-253-20109-8.
