= Zina R. Carter =

American politician (1846–1922)

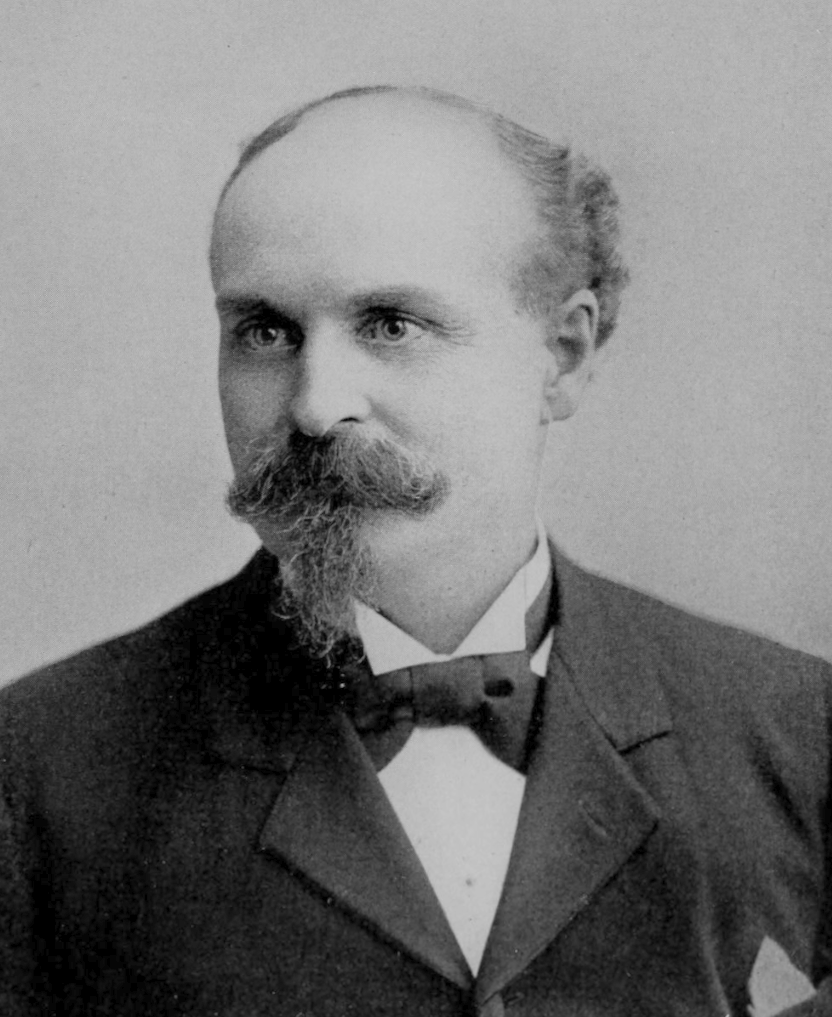
- Carter circa 1900

President of the Sanitary District of Chicago Board of Trustees
- In office 1903–1905
- Preceded by: Thomas A. Smyth
- Succeeded by: Charles H. Sergel

Trustee of the Sanitary District of Chicago
- In office 1896–1905

Chicago Alderman from the 10th ward
- In office 1895–1896 Serving with Fred C. Engel
- Preceded by: John F. Dorman
- Succeeded by: August W. Miller

Personal details
- Born: October 23, 1846 Jefferson County, New York
- Died: April 19, 1922 (aged 75) Chicago, Illinois
- Resting place: Rosehill Cemetery
- Party: Republican
- Relatives: Orrin N. Carter (brother)
- Occupation: Businessman, politician
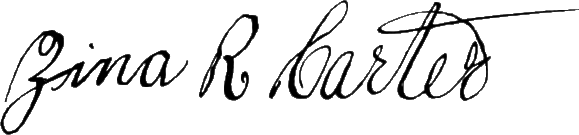
- Signature

Zina Roscoe Carter (Note: Growing up, his family pronounced his name "Zeena", but as an adult he preferred "ZINE-ah".) (1846–1922) was an American businessman and politician who served as the president of the Sanitary District of Chicago Board of Trustees as well as a Chicago alderman. He was the unsuccessful Republican Party nominee for mayor of Chicago in 1899. He also served as president of the Chicago Board of Trade for the year 1898.

== Early life and family ==
Carter was born on a farm in Jefferson County, New York, on October 23, 1846. When he was 16, he moved with his family to DuPage County, Illinois.

Carter had four siblings – Orrin, Alpheus, Benajah, and Armada.

== Business career ==
Carter moved to Chicago in 1871. There, he founded the Z. R. Carter and Bro. feed and flour business.

Carter was a member of the Chicago Board of Trade for nearly four decades. He served as its president in 1898.

== Political career ==
=== Chicago alderman ===
In 1895, Carter was elected a member of the Chicago City Council from the tenth ward.

=== Sanitary District of Chicago board of trustees ===
Having been elected to the Sanitary District of Chicago board of trustees in the November 5, 1895 election, Carter resigned from the Chicago City Council in January 1896 to assume his new office. He was reelected to the board of trustees on November 5, 1900.

In 1899, Carter was the Republican Party's nominee for mayor of Chicago. He lost the election to Carter Harrison IV

In November 1903, an agreement was reached that the board would elect Carter would be voted by the Sanity District's board as its president on December 8, 1903. He served in this position until December 4, 1905, when his tenure on the board of trustees altogether ended.

=== Later career ===
Carter was appointed by Mayor Fred A. Busse in May 1907 to the Chicago Civil Service Commission.

== Death ==
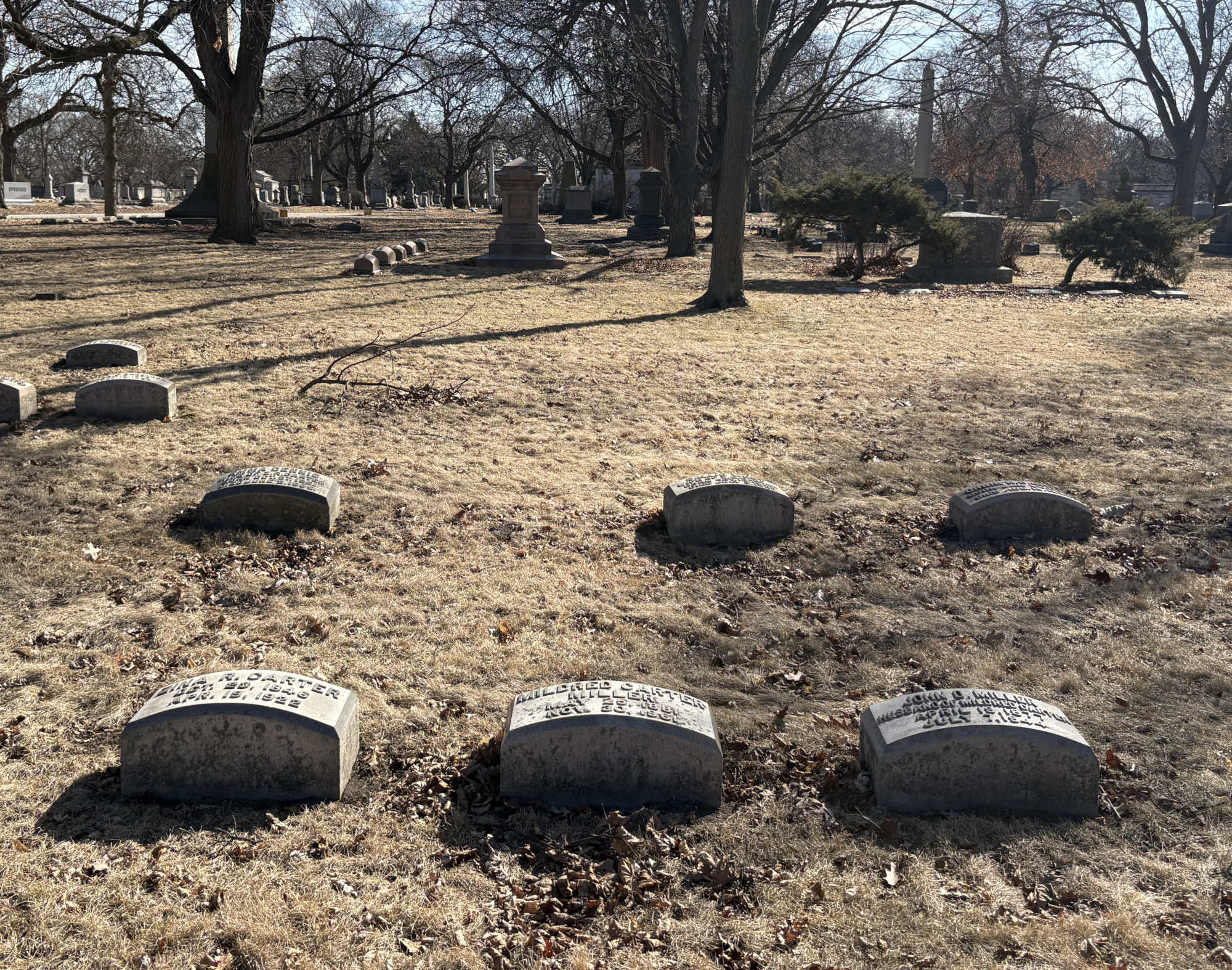
Carter's grave (front left) at Rosehill Cemetery

After a brief illness, Carter died at the age of 75 on April 19, 1922, at Chicago's Columbus Hospital. He was buried at Rosehill Cemetery.
