= First Ward Ball =

- Locations: Chicago, Illinois
- Country: United States
- Most recent: 1908
- Attendance: 10,000–15,000

The First Ward Ball was an annual political fundraiser with 10,000–15,000 attendees held in Chicago from 1896 until 1908, until the city revoked the liquor license in 1909. It was notorious for the riot-like behavior of the illustrious guests. According to the Chicago Tribune, the first ball in 1896 had "attracted a wild mix of society thrill seekers, police captains, politicians, prostitutes and gamblers" and "the 1908 ball made that affair look tame". Initially held at the 7th Regiment Armory, by the time it was banned the ball was so large that it took place in the Chicago Coliseum, the city's major convention center.

The event raised more than $50,000 a year for the two aldermen of Chicago's first ward: "Bathhouse" John Coughlin and Michael "Hinky Dink" Kenna. Coughlin and Kenna were known as the "Lords of the Levee", a red-light district of Chicago. The Ball was finally closed down in 1909 by Mayor Fred Busse. Besides its notoriety in attracting many unsavory characters, it often ended with the police having to curb disorderly conduct bordering on rioting.
