= Orrin N. Carter =

American judge

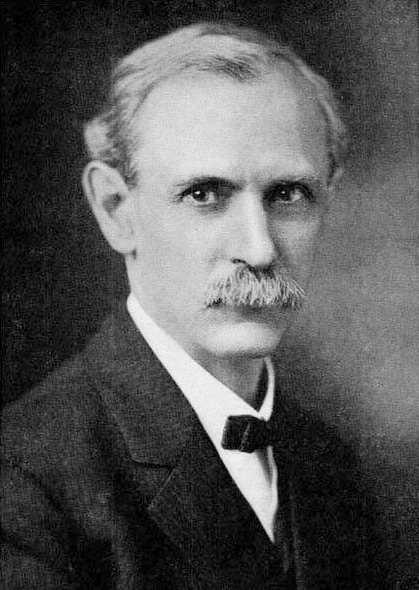
- Carter circa 1923

Justice of the Illinois Supreme Court
- In office 1906–1924

Personal details
- Born: January 22, 1854 Jefferson County, New York, U.S.
- Died: August 16, 1928 (aged 74) Glendale, California, U.S.
- Resting place: Rosehill Cemetery
- Party: Republican
- Relatives: Zina R. Carter (brother)
- Education: Wheaton College
- Occupation: Jurist

Orrin Nelson Carter (January 22, 1854 – August 16, 1928) was an American jurist.

== Biography ==
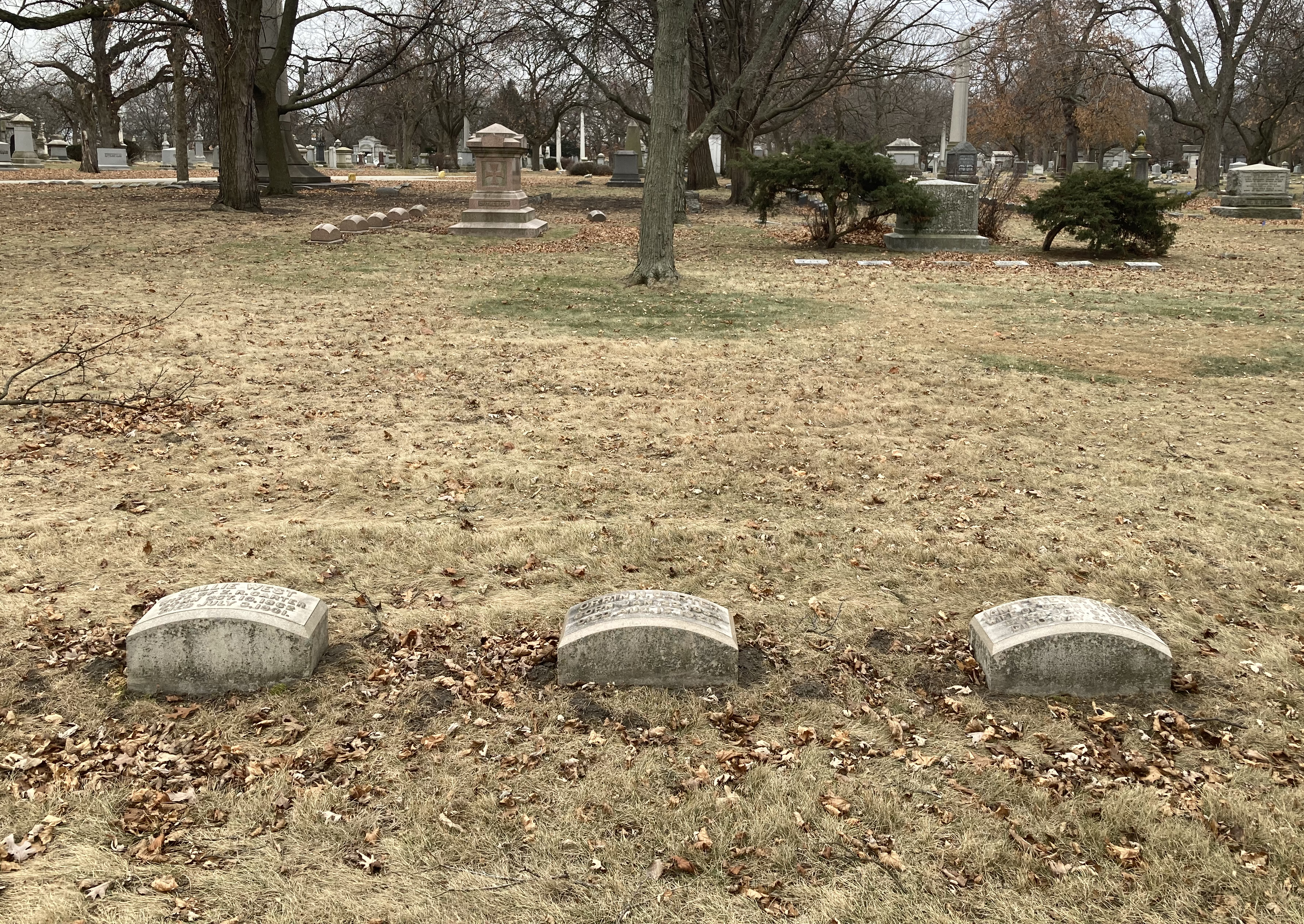
Carter's grave (center) at Rosehill Cemetery

Born in Jefferson County, New York, Carter moved with his parents to DuPage County, Illinois where he lived on a farm. Carter received his bachelor's degree from Wheaton College in 1877. Carter studied law and was admitted to the Illinois bar. He taught school in Grundy County, Illinois and served as state's attorney for Grundy County. In 1888, he moved to Chicago, Illinois and served as attorney for the Chicago Sanitary District from 1892 to 1894. In 1894, Carter was elected circuit court judge for Cook County, Illinois. In 1900, Carter was a candidate for the Republican nomination for Governor of Illinois. From 1906 until 1924, Carter served on the Illinois Supreme Court. He retired in 1924 because of ill health and died at his home in Glendale, California. He was buried at Rosehill Cemetery in Chicago.

He was the brother of businessman and politician Zina R. Carter.
