= Michael Kenna (politician) =

American politician

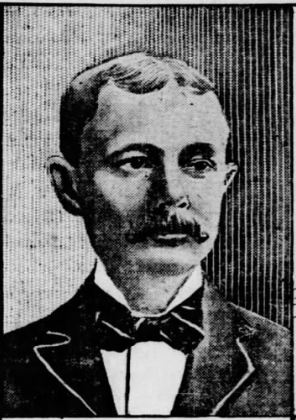
- Alderman Kenna in 1901

Alderman on the Chicago City Council from the 1st ward
- In office April 12, 1939 – April 9, 1943
- Preceded by: Vacant, previously John Coughlin
- Succeeded by: John Budinger
- In office April 19, 1897 – April 16, 1923 Serving with John Coughlin
- Preceded by: Francis P. Gleason
- Succeeded by: John Coughlin

Member of the Cook County Democratic Party Central Committee
- In office December 21, 1893 – April 1944 Serving with John P. Leindecker (1893 – 1895); John Coughlin (after 1895)
- Preceded by: James Walsh
- Succeeded by: Fred M. Morelli
- Constituency: 1st Ward

Personal details
- Born: August 20, 1857 (Note: Wendt & Kogan, p. 73 gives his birth as happening during a winter night in 1858. The Chicago Tribune's obituary states that a baptismal record gives his birth as August 20, 1857, which is also the date given by his death certificate. The Associated Press indicates a death age of either 88 or 91, implying a birth year of 1854–1855 or 1857–1858, and notes confusion on the matter in both the official record and Kenna's own words. Birth certificates were not mandatory in Illinois until 1877.) Chicago, Illinois, U.S.
- Died: October 9, 1946 (aged 88–89) Chicago, Illinois, U.S.
- Party: Democratic

Michael Kenna (August 20, 1857 – October 9, 1946), also known as "Hinky Dink", was an American politician who served as alderman from Chicago's 1st ward from 1897 to 1923 and again from 1939 to 1943. In addition to his position as alderman he was committeeman of the 1st Ward for the Democratic Party from 1893 to 1944. Representing the Chicago Loop and later its environs in such capacities, he led what was often called the "world's richest ward". He and his partner, fellow 1st Ward alderman "Bathhouse John" Coughlin, controlled the ward for most of the first half of the 20th century.

A part of 1st Ward politics for more than 60 years, Kenna possessed great influence on the municipal affairs of Chicago, being able to make or break the prospects of Democratic candidates for the mayoralty. In large part with Kenna's help Coughlin would serve as alderman from the ward for 46 years. Possessing such influence despite his short stature and unassuming presence, he and Coughlin constructed a political machine that would last for the better part of the 20th century.

Kenna was notoriously corrupt; he, Coughlin, and several other aldermen led what was known as the "Gray Wolves", a group that attracted much scorn from reformers. He and Coughlin in particular were infamous across the nation and globe. Of particular note were his tactics involving bribing homeless people to vote as desired and performing voter fraud for his candidates. He was also intimate with several figures of organized crime in the city; he and Coughlin were known as the "Lords of the Levee" after the Levee vice district in the 1st Ward which provided them with the financial and political support of sex workers, pimps, tavern owners, and gamblers in exchange for protection from law enforcement.

== Early life ==
Michael Kenna was born in the late 1850s to Catherine (née Ferrel) and John Kenna, both immigrants from County Cork. He was born at the corner of Polk and Sholto (modern-day Carpenter) streets at the edge of "Connelly's Patch" on Chicago's Near West Side. At age 10 he left school and began selling newspapers. At age 12, by then an orphan, he borrowed $50 (Note: $1,000 in 2018) from a barkeeper and purchased a newsstand at the corner of Monroe and Dearborn Streets. He was so successful that he was able to pay back the loan within a month, and would sell newspapers at the stand until 1877. According to legend, it was at this time that Kenna got the nickname "Hinky Dink" from Chicago Tribune publisher Joseph Medill due to his small stature; as an adult he stood 5 feet 4 inches (163 cm) tall. (Note: Abbott, p. 58 gives a height of 5 feet 1 inch (155 cm).) Kenna variously professed ignorance of the nickname's origin or claimed that it arose at "th' old swimming hole." He was also known as "the little fellow". In 1879 he moved to Leadville, Colorado, to work for a newspaper in the area, returning to Chicago in 1881.

== Political career ==
=== 1st Ward ===
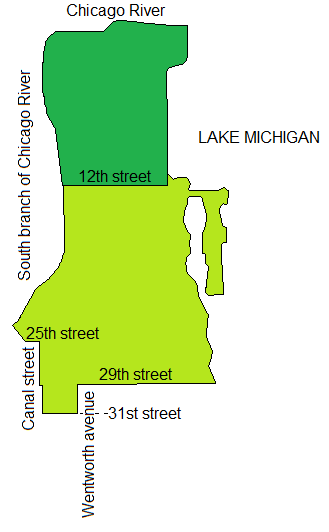
Boundaries of the 1st Ward in 1893 1946

At the close of the 19th century Chicago had a reputation of bad morals, central to which was the 1st Ward, home to a teeming vice district. It was also home to Chicago's central business district, which would later be called "the Loop" after the looping elevated railroad trackage constructed in it in the late 1890s. Due to the presence of the Loop the 1st Ward was often known as the "world's richest" ward, a fact which Coughlin would use to fire back at critics of his tenure. As the first half of the 20th century progressed the 1st Ward would expand southward to also encompass most of the surrounding Near South Side.

At the time of Kenna's ascendancy the vice elements of the 1st Ward and throughout the city were protected by "King Mike" McDonald, who had lived in the city since the late 1850s and controlled its gambling since shortly thereafter, and was credited with first saying "there's a sucker born every minute." However, by 1890, his reign began to end and a power vacuum started developing.

Corruption was not uncommon in late 19th-century Chicago; aldermen would charge for licenses and infrastructural projects within their wards, a practice known as "boodling". A group of aldermen including Kenna and Coughlin known as the "Gray Wolves" were particularly infamous for their propensities towards boodling. Supporters of the pair said that Kenna and Coughlin were unfairly targeted by the reformers and yet reelected by their constituents every election cycle.

=== Early career ===
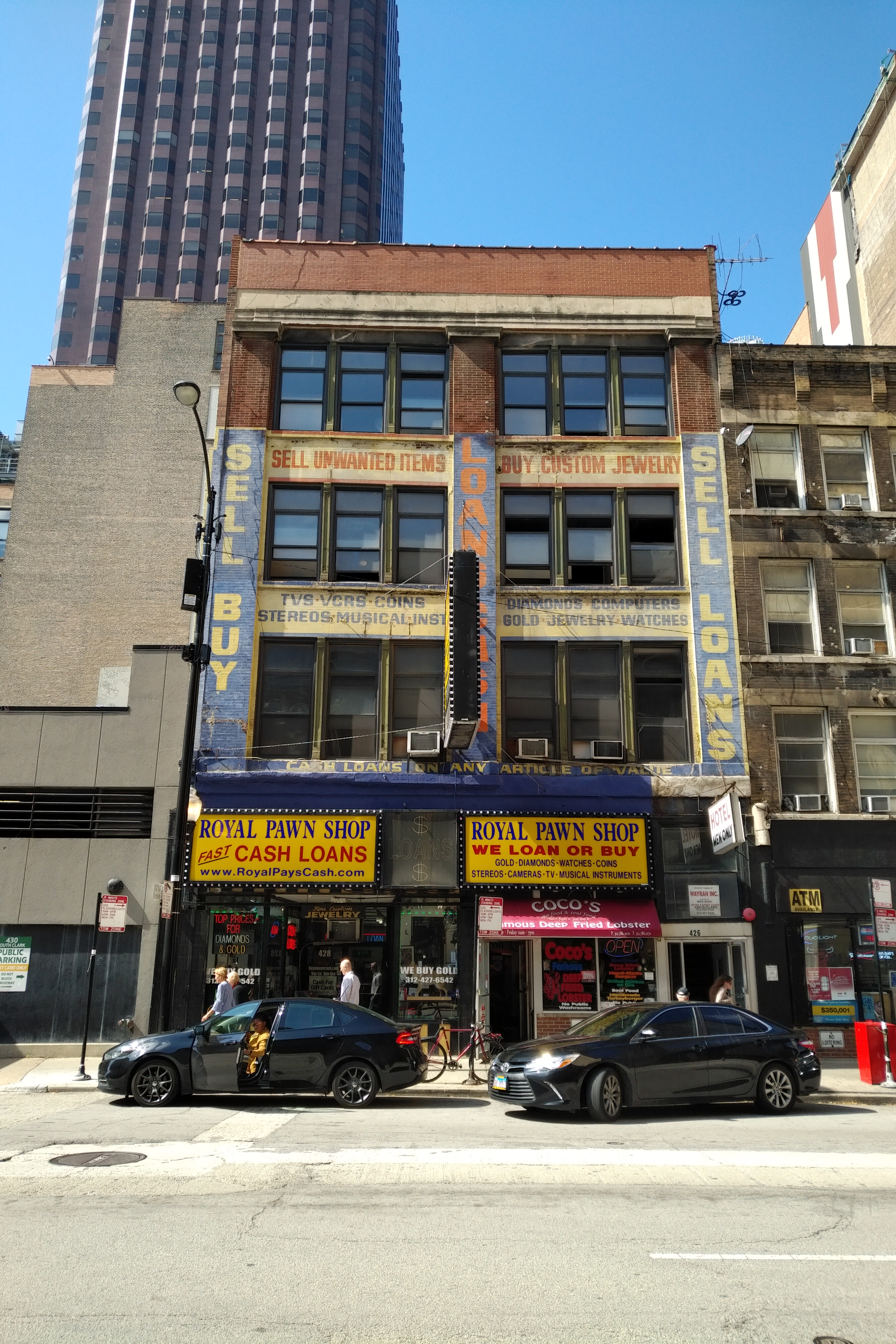
The building that housed the Workingman's Exchange and Alaska Hotel, pictured in 2019.

Upon his return to Chicago Kenna opened a saloon on Clark Street known as the Workingman's Exchange where he doled out meals to the indigent in exchange for votes. Above the Workingman's Exchange was the Alaska Hotel, which could provide space for 300 men, and up to 600 during elections. By 1882 his saloon was a success and he was a fixture in the 1st Ward Democratic organization under Chesterfield Joe Mackin; his work in securing Grover Cleveland's victory in the 1884 election led Mackin to make him captain of his precinct immediately prior to being imprisoned for fraud related to that election. It was at this time that Kenna first encountered John Coughlin, although the two would not become close friends for a while. Coughlin, who had in his early life served as a bathhouse masseur, was popularly known as "Bathhouse John" or "The Bath". When Coughlin was first elected as alderman in 1892, Kenna helped the campaign as he normally would but did not make any extra effort. When Carter Harrison III ran for mayor in 1893, Kenna was to quick to support him while Coughlin was one of the last holdouts, straining relations between the two. However, Harrison's betrayal of Kenna by prosecuting him for gambling just like others in the 1st Ward, as well as the rise of the detested rival Billy Skakel, led Kenna to reconsider an alliance with Coughlin as McDonald's influence started to wane. In 1893, Kenna proposed an alliance which Coughlin readily accepted. Coughlin was the public face of the machine while Kenna would work in the background.

Kenna started the new organization by proposing that a defense fund be organized from protection money from brothel keepers and gamblers to legally defend members of the organization who got into trouble. From such fund two lawyers would be retained at $10,000 (Note: $280,000 in 2018) a year to represent organization members; Kenna and Coughlin themselves paid the initial $10,000. The future judge John R. Caverly, who would later preside over the trial of Leopold and Loeb, received his first fees from this fund.

For the special mayoral election triggered by Harrison's assassination, Kenna and Coughlin broke with traditional Harrison supporters by supporting John Patrick Hopkins. Kenna is noted as a member of the Cook County Democratic Party Central Committee for the 1st Ward as of December 21, 1893, serving alongside John P. Leindecker. He succeeded James Walsh, who had been an alderman from the 10th ward from 1883 to 1885.

An early example of Kenna's organizational skills was the 1894 aldermanic election. Coughlin was unanimously nominated as the Democratic nominee in what Lloyd Wendt and Herman Kogan would later call "the briefest political convention in Chicago's history" and was reported by the Chicago Herald as lasting "only a few minutes as the delegates were in a hurry to get away to attend a prize fight." However, rival Billy Skakel, who specialized in offering and soliciting gambling on fraudulent stock quotations and hated Coughlin for allowing local Prince Hal Varnell to cut into his turf, formed his own Independent Democratic Party. Working with Sol van Praag, who had ambitions of his own to rule the 1st Ward, he ran as a rival to Coughlin for the race and was endorsed by such publications as Mixed Drinks: The Saloon Keepers' Journal. Fearing for his career despite Kenna's insistence that he would win, Coughlin visited Hopkins, who unsuccessfully asked Skakel to withdraw from the race. Coughlin then presented a petition to get Skakel's name removed from the ballot, which was initially accepted by the election board but would later be overturned by a local judge and backfire on Coughlin. Nevertheless, Kenna reassured Coughlin of victory and used his organizational skills to bribe the homeless with fifty cents, (Note: $15 in 2018) as much food as desired, and a place to stay for each voter. Kenna also suggested that Coughlin visit Hopkins once again and remind him of how the duo had helped him avoid scandal in a gas-boodling concern. After Hopkins once again pled with Skakel to withdraw to no avail, he ordered the police department in the 1st Ward to detain any Skakel supporters seen and to close any saloons supporting Skakel immediately at midnight. Kenna also recruited members of the Quincy Street gang to protect any voters of Coughlin, noting that the police would ignore any tactics used to that effect; in such efforts he preceded van Praag, who had had a similar idea, by a few hours. Coughlin would win the election with 2,671 votes while independent Republican J. Irving Pearce received 1,261 and Skakel received 1,046. The tactics used in the election received much scorn in the press, with the Chicago Tribune writing that "Bathhouse John's election was secured by methods which would have disgraced even the worst river parishes of Louisiana", but neither Coughlin nor Kenna cared about such reception.

=== Entry into City Council ===
Van Praag and Skakel would get revenge when Kenna ran for alderman in 1895. Prior to the election, the City Council had passed an ordinance granting the dubious Ogden Gas Company the rights to manufacture, distribute, and sell gas for 50 years. The resultant Ogden Gas Scandal sparked an outrage in Chicagoans and would prove a disaster to the local Democratic party and especially Kenna's aldermanic aspirations. Irked about the events of 1894, van Praag and Skakel backed the Republican candidate Francis P. Gleason in the race, and a few days before the election Kenna found much of his vote-getting money having been spent to get the Ogden Gas ordinance passed while van Praag had much money of his own. Kenna ended up losing to Gleason by 366 votes. The papers rejoiced in his defeat, with the Chicago Tribune writing him the following poem:

"I t'ink"
Said Hink-
Y Dink,
"I'll take a drink."

It was found after the election that van Praag and Skakel had aided Gleason by giving the local Republican party the names and addresses of hundreds of Kenna's registered voters who were deceased or lived outside of the Ward; the Republicans then had the illegitimate names struck from the register.

The 1895 elections produced a Republican mayor and a Republican majority in the City Council, both of whom Charles Tyson Yerkes would fight in his efforts to construct rapid transit in the Loop during the Chicago Traction Wars. Kenna, recouping his forces in preparation for the 1897 race, saw that Coughlin could be of great use for Yerkes, and arranged for an alliance between him and rival 19th Ward alderman John Powers. However, Powers betrayed Coughlin by December, collaborating with Yerkes and the Republican majority to the exclusion of Coughlin and introducing most of Yerkes's ordinances which by custom should have been introduced by Coughlin. Coughlin and Kenna took their revenge on Powers by defeating his bid for the chair of the Cook County Democratic Party Central Committee in favor of free silverite Tommy Gahan.

Kenna was successful in entering the City Council in 1897. That same year Carter Harrison IV would be elected mayor in large part due to Kenna's organizational skills in the 1st Ward. Kenna repeated his tactics of paying the homeless for votes, much to the horror of the Republican-dominated Special Committee for the Detection and Prevention of Vote Frauds. Despite the best efforts of Republican Congressman William Lorimer to arrest those of dubious voter credentials, Kenna continued to attract homeless voters from other parts of the city. The Saturday before the election Harry G. Darrow, the proprietor of the new saloon The Bon Ton, issued an invitation for its grand opening, claiming that Kenna, Coughlin, and Harrison would be present. Coughlin came and socialized with the guests but Kenna and Harrison refused to come. Nevertheless, Kenna openly displayed his gambling affiliation in response to a condemnation to that effect by the reform-minded Municipal Voters' League (MVL), stating "Sure, I associate with gamblers. Why shouldn't I? I like a good game myself." Kenna defeated Gleason by 4,373 votes to 1,811 and took office on April 19.

Immediately upon assumption of office as a reward for his work for Harrison he was made Chairman of the Police committee, and was a member of the committees of Railroads; Gas, Oil, and Electricity; the Water Department; Elections; and Markets, which were considered among the best committees of the Council. Kenna made his introduction to the Council by quietly introducing an order for an ambulance division in the police department.

=== Influence and notoriety ===
After his election to the City Council Kenna's organizational prowess became known nationwide, to the extent that Tammany Hall boss Richard Croker asked his help to get Robert Van Wyck elected as the Mayor of the new City of Greater New York. He succeeded, and Van Wyck won with a plurality of 86,000 votes. His notoriety extended across the globe; people from England came and wrote the book If Christ came to Chicago, lambasting several Chicago politicians and Kenna and Coughlin in particular.

In 1901 he and four other saloonkeepers were arrested for violating ordinances regarding saloon hours. The arrest came after deputy state health inspector Jacob Ball investigated the saloons in the 1st Ward and found almost 1,000 homeless people lodged in 18 saloons. The prosecutor in the case, Thomas F. Scully, was unprepared to prosecute the case and Kenna was acquitted by the jury, leading to Scully's suspension for thirty days. A 1902 editorial on Coughlin referred to his "sole claim to even political strength [as] rest[ing] on his being a parasitical partner" of Kenna.

In the 1911 Chicago mayoral election Kenna backed Harrison, allowing him to get the Democratic nomination; when Democrats under the chieftain Roger Sullivan supported his opponent Charles Merriam in the general election, Kenna and the 1st Ward gave Harrison the margin of victory needed to win. Things would turn out differently in 1915 Scandal had befallen the duo with an exposé on the exploits of the Levee, leading to county judge John Owens's insisting that Kenna and Coughlin be ejected from the Democratic committee. Harrison acquiesced to these demands, declaring that Kenna's and Coughlin's careers were finished unless they towed the line and supported his entire slate of candidates, including Owens. Angry about this turn of events, the two joined Sullivan in leading a rebellion against Harrison that several other Democrats would join, including Powers and the nascent Anton Cermak. In that same election he selected Scully as the candidate for county judge against Owens despite several red-light district leaders supporting the latter, and successfully worked hard to get him elected. Harrison was defeated in the 1915 mayoral primary by the Sullivan-backed candidate Robert M. Sweitzer, who lost the general election to William Hale Thompson, an avowed enemy of Kenna and Coughlin.

=== Lord of the Levee ===
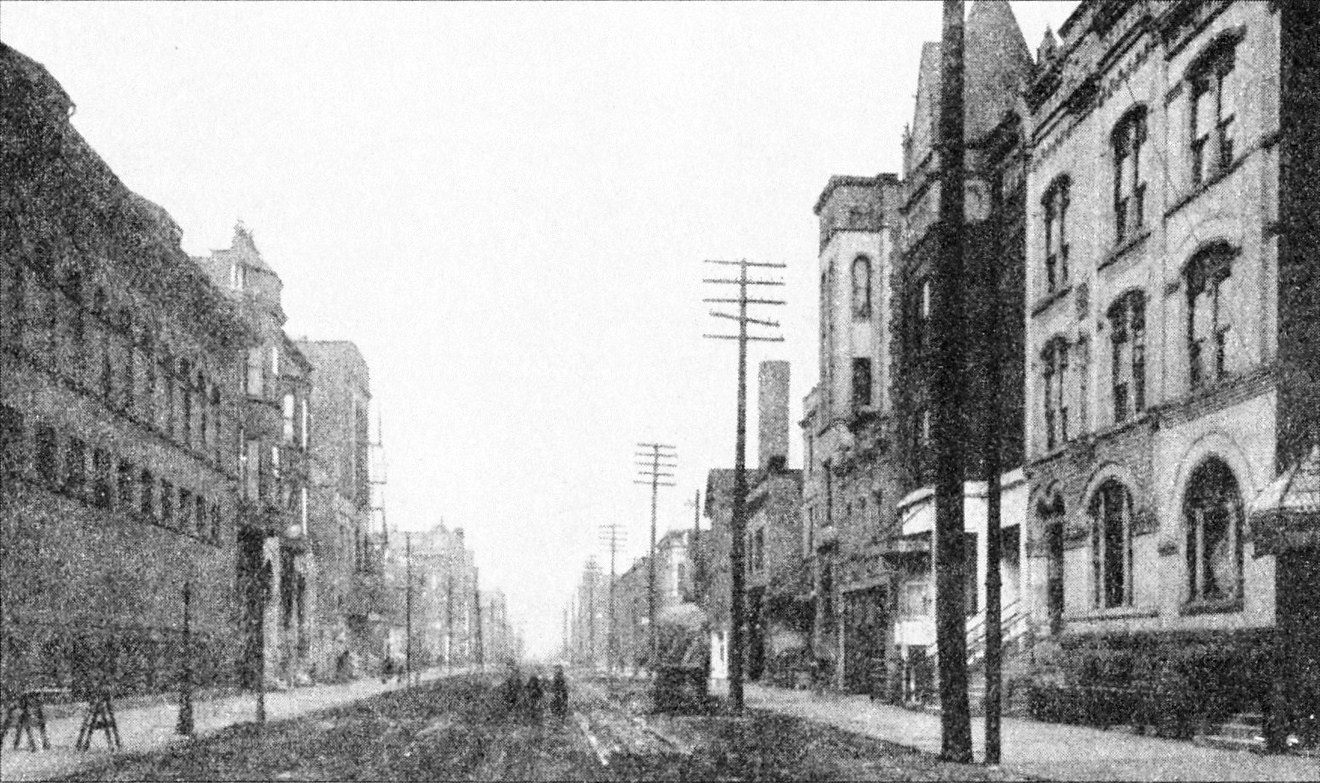
South Dearborn Street in the Levee, c. 1911. The Everleigh Club is to the far right.

The 1st Ward was home to a vice district known as "the Levee", which was named for a nearby wharf and contained some of the best-known brothels in Chicago. Among the brothels in the area was the Everleigh Club owned by the eponymous Everleigh sisters who had arrived from Omaha. It was well known internationally for its opulence and sex workers to the point where it was a point of pride for many Chicagoans. The club, Kenna, and Coughlin were inexorably linked in the imagination of people around the world. It was an important source of protection money for the two aldermen; one of the sisters stated that she had paid Coughlin over $100,000 (Note: $2,790,000 in 2018) over the course of 12 years, and Kenna and Coughlin ended up collecting over $15 million in graft from the Levee.

After the events of 1895, Kenna and Coughlin were particularly conscious of the need for a cash flow to finance their endeavors. They were discussing ideas at the Workingmen's Exchange shortly before Christmas when they stumbled on an idea. A party had been held annually for "Lame Jimmy", a disabled musician in Carrie Watson's establishment, since the late 1880s. These parties were initially held in what would become Freiberg's Hall on east 22nd Street (modern-day Cermak Road), and were marked by joy and peace with policemen being honored guests. However, a confrontation between police officers at the 1895 event resulted in an outcry against the event and it was banned. Realizing the potential in such an event, Coughlin suggested that the duo revive it under their tutelage. Although Kenna was not particularly keen on the idea, he figured it was not worth the trouble to stop Coughlin from pursuing it.

What resulted was the First Ward Ball, an annual fundraiser which quickly exceeded the excesses of the Lame Jimmy parties. The inaugural ball was held at the 7th Regiment Armory. Known as Coughlin's "Derby", it continued to grow in the early 20th century. Its reputation grew such that public pressure forced Mayor Fred Busse to withhold its liquor license in 1909; an event was still held at the Coliseum, but only 3,000 people attended.

Upon his election as mayor in 1915, Thompson opened up the city to vice and liquor. However, it was clear that Thompson controlled these areas, and the duo's rule over the ward remained insecure. In particular, Big Jim Colosimo, who was a trusted precinct captain, started to surpass Coughlin and Kenna and would soon take over representing the interests of vice. Within the ward the two were nevertheless safe as Thompson refused to challenge them directly, Colosimo remained on good enough terms with them, and the relief of vice obligations allowed them to concentrate on other matters. Both Kenna and Coughlin were present at Colosimo's funeral in 1920.

=== Prohibition ===
After alcoholic beverages were prohibited in the United States in 1920, The Workingman's Exchange had to close and Kenna ran a candy, sandwich, and cigar store in its place. In 1923 the Illinois General Assembly reduced the number of aldermen per ward from two to one, with the new Council to that effect taking office on April 16. Kenna, who never cared much for Council meetings, stepped aside to leave the alderman's position of the 1st Ward to Coughlin. Coughlin would find that the legislation increased his voting power in the council, while Kenna stated that he was content in his cigar store, where he hung up pictures of friends and prominent figures in the 1st Ward.

The power of the duo began to diminish in the 1920s as mobsters such as Johnny Torrio and Al Capone began to take control of the ward. Capone, who had originally worked for Torrio, would fight his way to the top of the vice scene in the area, and throughout the city. Capone had no need for the two and could have removed them from politics if he wanted. However, Capone took a liking to them, having noticed their previous loyalty to both Colosimo and Torrio. This increased the stature of the pair as Capone had prestige in the politics of the time, and Kenna had a position in the Cook County Democratic Party equal to Cermak, who was the president of the Cook County Board of Commissioners and known as the "Mayor of Cook County".

Cermak was elected mayor in 1931, and given that Capone had recently been convicted for tax evasion the duo hoped that from their ardent support of Cermak they could regain lost glory. However, Cermak turned out to spurn the old style of urban feudalism that had characterized their reign. Throughout the 1930s the new Democratic organization gave committeemen new powers but also subordinated them to the machine. It limited Coughlin's voting power such that the MVL insisted that he had mellowed his record, to which Coughlin responded with indignation and Kenna jocularly suggested that Coughlin sue them. In the later years of Coughlin's life Kenna prevented some of the younger members of the 1st Ward organization from attempting to take Coughlin's aldermanic seat before his death.

=== Return to City Council and later years ===
Coughlin died of pneumonia on November 11, 1938. Kenna was elected unopposed to fill his vacancy in the following year's aldermanic election. Coughlin's death had caused a surge of factionalism within the 1st Ward, and Kenna was thought to be the best candidate to ensure peace. Rich and aging, he had no desire to return to the City Council but was assured that his involvement would be minimal. Three opponents initially tried to contest him, but all had withdrawn by February 9.

He received a special ovation at the inaugural ceremony of the new Council on April 12. He rarely spoke at Council meetings and would soon stop coming altogether, sending his orders of the Council via his secretary Joe Clark. At that point Kenna was a figurehead, being present for name value and with power being held by others within the 1st Ward. For the last ten years of his tenure de facto power of the 1st Ward was held by a gang run by Jack Guzik, who used Coughlin as a figurehead prior to his death and Kenna thereafter. Throughout this time the Democratic organization considered Clark as the acting committeeman.

Kenna declined reelection to the Council in 1943. Two candidates appeared to take his seat. John Budinger had previously been alderman of the then-4th ward from 1910 to 1912 and a County Commissioner, and had the backing of the Democratic organization. James McVittie was the owner of an electroplating business and had the endorsements of the Business Men's Committee and Better Government Association. The contest was particularly aggressive; both candidates' petitions were contested in court, and McVittie accused Budinger of being falsely registered as a 1st Ward voter and actually living in Woodlawn, with the Business Men's Committee threatening to challenge Budinger if he attempted to vote in the 1st Ward. Budinger overwhelmingly won the election in the first round with what McVittie's supporters claimed were illegal and illegitimate tactics such as voter intimidation and took office April 9. Kenna stepped down as 1st Ward committeeman in 1944, effective April of that year. He endorsed Fred M. Morelli as his successor, and Morelli would be unopposed to succeed him as Democratic leader of the ward.

In 1943 historians Lloyd Wendt and Herman Kogan released the book Lords of the Levee, which concerns Coughlin and Kenna's activities. During the research for the book the pair interviewed Kenna and relatives of Coughlin. Kenna, who had the book read to him by an assistant, complained that he does not appear in the first 20 pages.

== Personal life and death ==
Kenna was a teetotaler. In his later years Kenna lived in hotels in the Loop. He died on October 9, 1946, at the Blackstone Hotel of diabetes and myocarditis.

Kenna was a millionaire at the time of his death. His heirs fought over his estate. Although Kenna left his heirs $33,000 (Note: $400,000 in 2018) to be used to erect a mausoleum for his remains to repose in, his heirs took all of the money and bought him an $85 (Note: $1,100 in 2018) tombstone instead.

== Legacy ==
It was thought that after Kenna stepped down the 1st Ward would be moved south and the Loop would be divided across multiple wards. Upon redistricting in 1948, the 1st Ward was combined with the erstwhile "Bloody 20th" Ward across the Chicago River's south branch. The 1st Ward committeemen of both parties resigned in favor of their counterparts of the old 20th Ward, largely due to the fact that the old 20th could have outvoted the old 1st. Nevertheless, the 1st Ward's reputation would last long after Kenna's death; by the 1980s it was well associated with organized crime. In 1991 allies of Mayor Richard M. Daley proposed, and the City Council approved, a redistricting that renumbered much of the 1st Ward as the 42nd Ward at the request of businesses in the area, who felt that the 1st Ward had gained too much of a negative connotation. As of 2019 the 42nd Ward alderman is Brendan Reilly and the 1st Ward alderman is Daniel La Spata.

The last surviving link to Kenna and Coughlin was Anthony C. Laurino, who served as an assistant precinct captain under their tutelage and would later serve as alderman of the 39th Ward from 1965 to 1994, dying in 1999. Laurino, who was known for dealing mainly in the matters of the 39th Ward rather than those across the city, expressed pride in his political practices and credited the two for teaching them to him.

David K. Fremon argues in his book Chicago Politics Ward by Ward that while Coughlin and Kenna "are generally viewed as living cartoon characters[,]... both were astute men in their time. Were they to appear today [in 1988], they would probably have made their fortunes through law, insurance, or real estate[.]" Reflecting on their tenure, reformer Paul Douglas noted:

Here were two men of the people who rose to power not merely by brawn and self-assertiveness but also by acting as the very human friends of people in poverty and trouble. They fed the hungry and got jobs for the unemployed. They protected those in trouble with the law. In return, like the condottieri of the medieval cities, they demanded and obtained loyalty and obedience. ... Can [reformers] meet the human needs which the blundering Bath and the Shrewd Hink served, and do so without the corruption that they practiced?

A 2012 retrospective by NBC News Chicago ranked Kenna and Coughlin as the 3rd and 4th most corrupt public officials in Illinois history, behind Thompson and Illinois Secretary of State Paul Powell.

== See also ==
- List of Chicago aldermen since 1923

== Bibliography ==
- Abbott, Karen (2007). Sin in the Second City: Madams, Ministers, Playboys, and the Battle for America's Soul. New York, New York: Random House. ISBN 978-1-4000-6530-1.
- Fremon, David K. (1988). Chicago Politics Ward by Ward. Bloomington, Indiana and Indianapolis, Indiana: Indiana University Press. ISBN 0-253-31344-9.
- Lindberg, Richard C. (2008). To Serve and Collect: Chicago Politics and Police Corruption from the Lager Beer Riot to the Summerdale Scandal, 1855–1960. Carbondale, Illinois: Southern Illinois University Press. ISBN 978-0-8093-2223-7.
- Hogan, John F. (2018). Chicago Shakedown: The Ogden Gas Scandal. Charleston, South Carolina: The History Press. ISBN 9781467139519.
- Sawyers, June Skinner (1991). Chicago Portraits: Biographies of 250 Famous Chicagoans. Chicago, Illinois: Loyola University Press. ISBN 0-8294-0700-6.
- Wendt, Lloyd; Kogan, Herman (1971). Bosses in Lusty Chicago (a.k.a. Lords of the Levee) (2nd ed.). Bloomington, Indiana and Indianapolis, Indiana: Indiana University Press. ISBN 0-253-20109-8.

Political offices
Preceded by Francis P. Gleason	Member of the Chicago City Council; 1st Ward; 1897 – 1923; Served alongside: John Coughlin	Succeeded by John Coughlin
Vacant Title last held by John Coughlin	Member of the Chicago City Council; 1st Ward; 1939 – 1943	Succeeded by John Budinger
