= Gray Wolves (Chicago) =

Corrupt aldermen, 1890s-1930s

Cartoons from the Chicago Tribune depicting "Bathhouse" John (left) and "Hinky Dink" Kenna (right).

The Gray Wolves were corrupt Chicago aldermen who held office from the 1890s to the 1930s.

The Gray Wolves were led by first ward aldermen "Bathhouse" John Coughlin, "Hinky Dink" Mike Kenna, and Johnny Powers of the Nineteenth Ward.

The Chicago City Council frequently gave franchises to private businesses to maintain public services. Many businesses bribed the aldermen to be awarded such contracts, a practice known as "boodling".

== The Ogden Gas Company Scandal ==
In 1895 the Gray Wolves awarded a franchise to the non-existent Ogden Gas Company to force the existing franchise holder to buy up the rights of Ogden Gas. This and similar schemes resulted in the formation of the Municipal Voters League in 1896 to throw the Gray Wolves aldermen off the council.

Lincoln Steffens, a muck-raking reporter from McClure's Magazine, was the first to describe these aldermen as gray wolves "for the color of their hair and the rapacious cunning and greed of their natures."

== See also ==
- Lords of the Levee
- Black Horse Cavalry
