= Lloyd Wendt =

American journalist

- Born: May 16, 1908; Spencer, South Dakota, U.S.
- Died: October 21, 2007 (aged 99); Sanford, Florida, U.S.
- Education: Northwestern University
- Occupations: Journalist, author
- Employer(s): Chicago Tribune, Chicago's American, Chicago Today
- Notable work: Lords of the Levee, Big Bill of Chicago, Chicago Tribune: The Rise of a Great American Newspaper

Lloyd Wendt (May 16, 1908 – October 21, 2007) was a longtime Chicago journalist and the author of a number of books. After a lengthy battle with Alzheimer's, Wendt died in a nursing home in Sanford, Florida.

Wendt was originally from Spencer, South Dakota. He graduated from Northwestern University in Evanston, Illinois and joined the Chicago Tribune as a reporter in 1934. After serving in naval intelligence as a lieutenant from 1943 to 1946, he returned to the Tribune, then in 1961 became editor of the Chicago's American newspaper, remaining as both editor and publisher when the paper changed its name to Chicago Today in 1969.

Wendt co-authored several books with colleague Herman Kogan, wrote others on his own and taught fiction at Northwestern. He died at age 99.

== Publications ==
- Four nonfiction pieces with Herman Kogan;
  - Lords of the Levee. Indianapolis: Bobbs-Merrill, 1943
  - Give the Lady What She Wants: the story of Marshall Field & Company. Chicago: Rand, McNally, 1952
  - Big Bill of Chicago. Indianapolis: Bobbs-Merrill, 1953
  - Chicago: A Pictorial History. New York: Bonanza, 1958
- "Chicago Tribune": the rise of a great American newspaper. Chicago: Rand, McNally, 1979
- Swift Walker: an informal biography of Gurdon Saltonstall Hubbard. Chicago: Regnery, 1986
- The Wall Street Journal: The story of Dow Jones & the nation's business newspaper. Chicago: Rand McNally & Co., 1982
