= Herman Kogan =

American journalist

Herman Kogan (November 6, 1914 – March 8, 1989) was an American journalist who spent fifty years covering the city of Chicago, many with the Chicago Daily News and Chicago Sun-Times.

Kogan, a 1936 graduate of the University of Chicago and a Phi Beta Kappa, authored several books, including The Great EB: The Story of the Encyclopædia Britannica] (University of Chicago Press, 1958); Yesterday's Chicago (E.A. Seeman, 1976); Give the Lady What She Wants: The Story of Marshall Field & Company (co-authored with Lloyd Wendt, Rand McNally, 1952); Big Bill of Chicago (Co-authored with Lloyd Wendt, Bobbs-Merrill, 1953); Lords of the Levee (Co-authored with Lloyd Wendt; Bobbs-Merrill, 1943) and Chicago: A Pictorial History (co-authored with Lloyd Wendt; Bonanza, 1958).

Kogan was the father of current Chicago Tribune journalist and WBEZ radio host Rick Kogan. Kogan was Jewish.
