= Luna Park, Chicago =

American amusement park

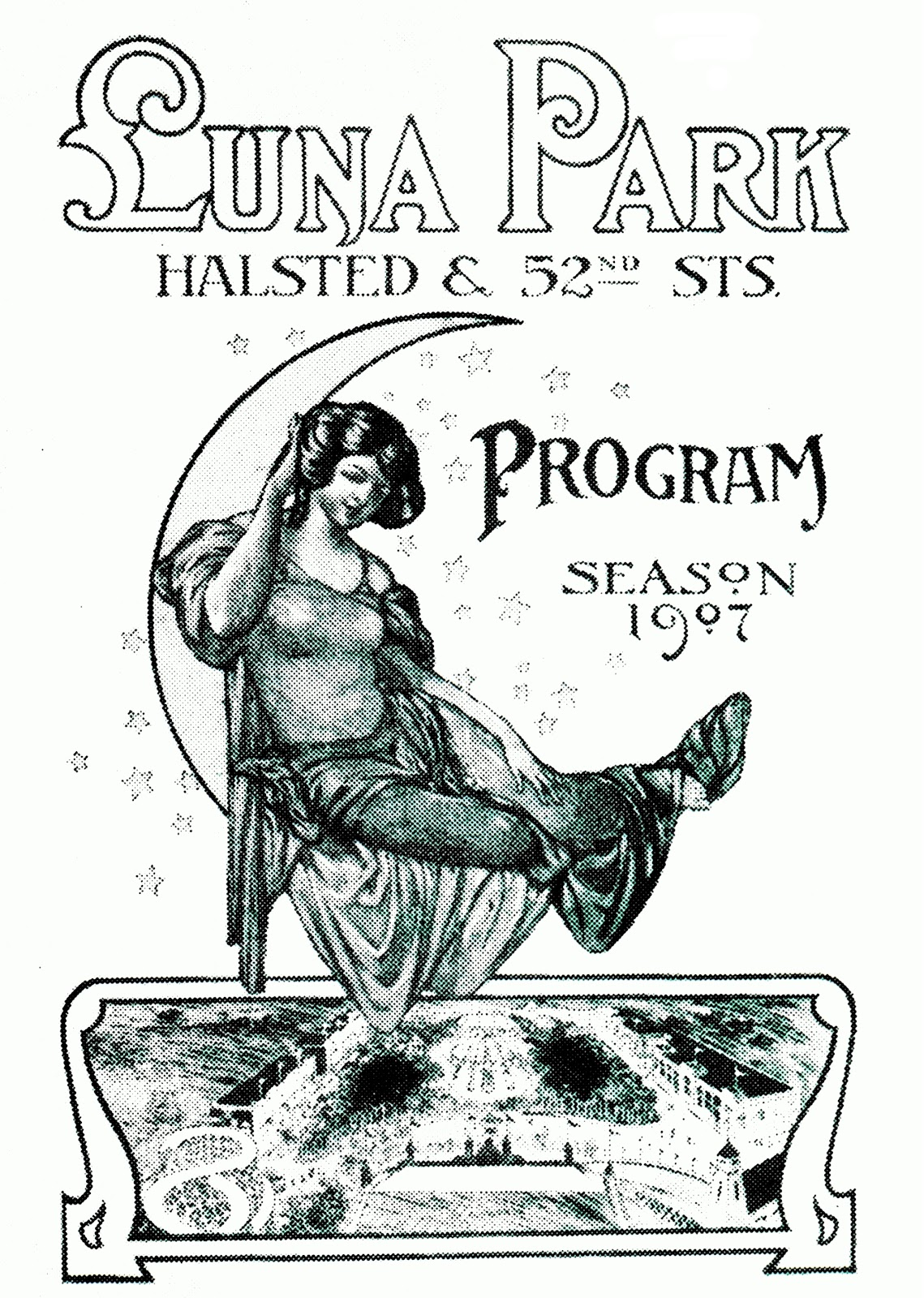
Pamphlet for the 1907 season

Luna Park was an amusement park that was in operation in Chicago, Illinois, from 1907 to 1911. Located on the plot of a former picnic grove at the corner of 51st and Halsted Streets, it was owned by an investment group led by boxing promoter James "Big Jim" O'Leary (son of Mrs. O'Leary of Great Chicago Fire fame). A trolley park occupying only ten acres, Luna Park was smaller than most of the other Chicago amusement parks of the era (most notably Riverview Park and White City; in fact, Riverview Park was the largest amusement park in existence at that time). O'Leary became the park's manager in 1908.

Attractions included a midway, a ballroom, a roller coaster, a roller skating rink, concessions, live entertainment (including vaudeville and boxing), and a restaurant.

Initially popular (averaging 5000 patrons a day in its peak), attendance declined in light of the increasing competition from other Chicago-area amusement parks. In 1910, management temporarily closed the park in response to flagging attendance. The park was reopened in 1911 as O'Leary attempted to find new ownership to no avail. In 1912, most of the attractions were removed; the remaining structures were converted into a large food market hall.

In 1916, the grounds were sold to real estate developer James H. Milligan for the building of single-family houses.
