= In Old Chicago =

1938 film by Henry King, Robert D. Webb

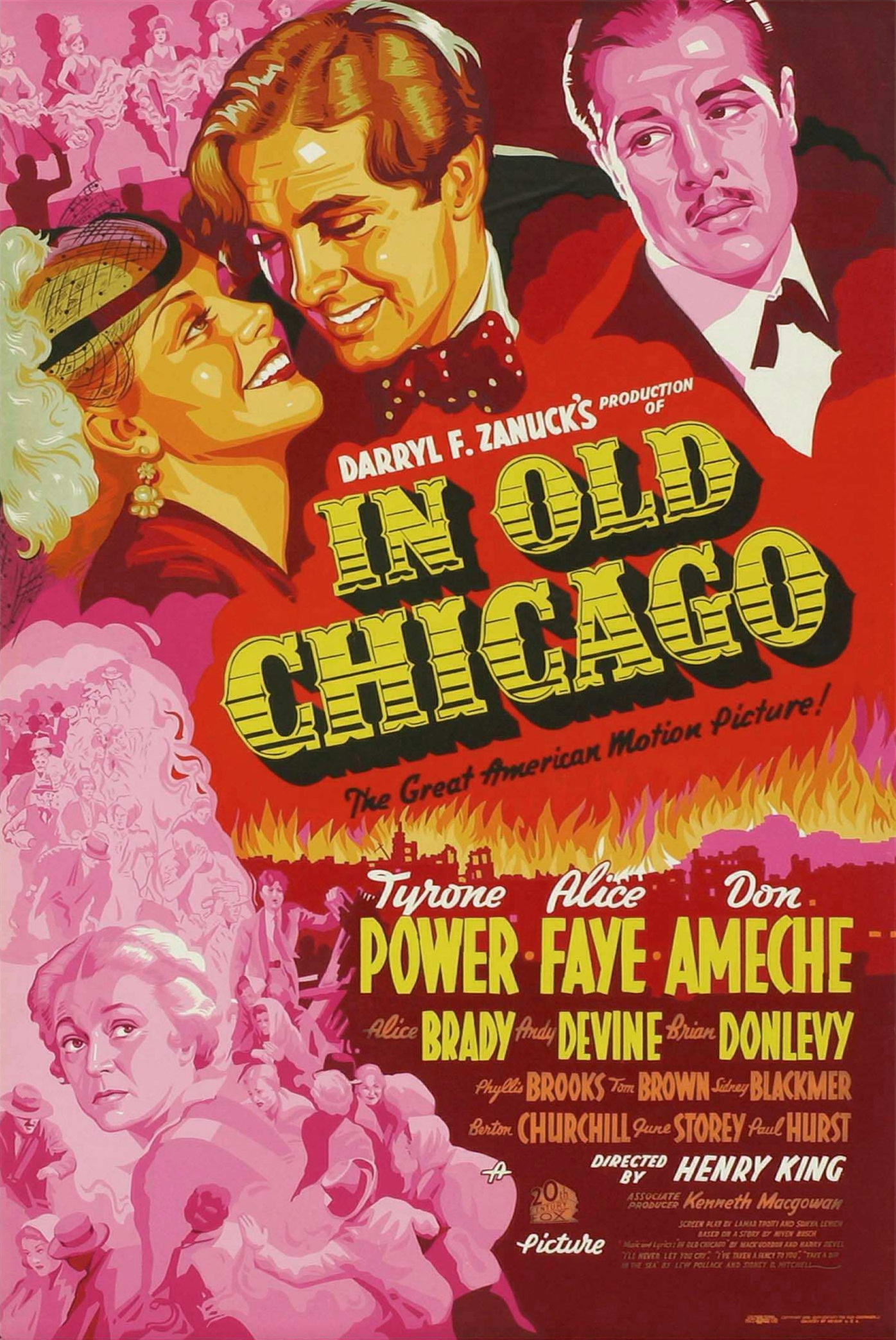
- Theatrical release poster
- Directed by: Henry King
- Written by: Story: Niven Busch
- Screenplay by: Sonya Levien; Lamar Trotti
- Produced by: Kenneth Macgowan (associate producer)
- Starring: Tyrone Power; Alice Faye; Don Ameche; Alice Brady; Andy Devine; Brian Donlevy; Phyllis Brooks; Tom Brown; Sidney Blackmer; Berton Churchill; June Storey; Paul Hurst
- Cinematography: J. Peverell Marley
- Edited by: Barbara McLean
- Music by: Sidney Clare; Lew Pollack
- Production company: Darryl F. Zanuck Productions
- Distributed by: 20th Century Fox
- Release date: January 6, 1938
- Running time: 96 minutes (US theatrical cut); 111 minutes (Roadshow version)
- Country: United States
- Language: English
- Budget: over $1 million
- Box office: $1.964 million (U.S. and Canada rentals)

In Old Chicago is a 1938 American disaster musical drama film directed by Henry King. The screenplay by Sonya Levien and Lamar Trotti was based on the Niven Busch story, "We the O'Learys". The film is a fictionalized account about the Great Chicago Fire of 1871 and stars Alice Brady as Mrs. O'Leary, the owner of the cow that started the fire, with Tyrone Power and Don Ameche as her sons. It also stars Alice Faye and Andy Devine. At the time of its release, it was one of the most expensive movies ever made.

== Plot ==
In 1854, the O'Leary family is traveling to Chicago to start a new life when Patrick O'Leary tries to race a steam train in his wagon. He is killed when his wagon hits a bump and his horses break loose, dragging him. His wife Molly and their three boys are left to survive on their own. In town, she agrees to prove her skills as a laundress when a woman's dress is accidentally spattered with mud. She quickly proves herself and builds a laundry business in an area known as "the Patch". Her sons are educated. One, Jack, becomes a reforming lawyer, but another, Dion, is involved in gambling. While washing a sheet, Mrs. O'Leary discovers a drawing, apparently created by Gil Warren, a devious local businessman. Her sons realize that it reveals that he has a plan to run a tramline along a street that his cronies and he intend to buy up cheaply.

Dion becomes enamored with a feisty saloon-bar singer, Belle, who works for Warren. After a stormy courtship, they become lovers. Meanwhile, Bob, the youngest O'Leary son, who helps his mother, is in love with Gretchen, an innocent German girl. They meet in the barn watched by the O'Leary's cow Daisy and plan to marry. Mrs. O'Leary approves of the match, but expresses disdain for the loose-living Belle.

Dion and Belle bribe the local politicians to set up a saloon on the street where the tramline will pass. Dion makes a deal to support Warren's political career and carve up business in the town. However, Dion's dishonest practices lead to conflict with his brother Jack when one of Dion's cronies is arrested for multiple voting. Dion later decides to support his brother rather than Warren in the election, convinced he can cut out Warren altogether and reign in Jack's reformist zeal. He is increasingly attracted by the daughter of the corrupt local senator, leading to conflicts with Belle. Bob and Gretchen marry and have a baby.

At a Warren election rally, a fight breaks out, arranged by Dion. All Warren's election workers are arrested. Jack is elected mayor. He soon announces a campaign against corruption, targeting his brother's fiefdom in the Patch, which he intends to demolish. Belle and Dion separate when Jack asks her to support him. When he realizes Belle might testify against him, Dion asks her to marry him, making her testimony inadmissible. As mayor, Jack marries the couple, but knocks Dion out in a fist fight as soon he realizes he has been deceived.

Mrs. O'Leary is told about the fight while helping Daisy's calf to suckle. In her distress, she leaves a lamp in the barn, and Daisy knocks it over. A fire breaks out. Soon, the whole of the Patch is on fire. Dion, Warren, and their cronies are convinced that Jack has set the fire. Warren's men look for Jack, seeking revenge. Advised by Philip Sheridan, Jack plans to create a firebreak by dynamiting buildings to stop the fire reaching the gasworks, but Warren's gang tries to stop him. When Dion learns from Bob how the fire really started, he rushes to Jack's aid. In the struggle, Jack and Dion fight off the gang and set off the dynamite, but Jack is shot by one of Warren's thugs and then killed by a falling building. Warren attempts to flee, but is trampled to death by stampeding cattle from the stockyards.

Dion and Bob help to save Gretchen and the baby, while Belle rescues Mrs O'Leary. They all manage to escape to the river. Belle and Dion are reconciled, and Mrs. O'Leary predicts that the city will be rebuilt and flourish after her son's sacrifice for its future.

== Cast ==
- Tyrone Power as Dion O'Leary
- Alice Faye as Belle Fawcett
- Don Ameche as Jack O'Leary
- Alice Brady as Mrs. Molly O'Leary
- Phyllis Brooks as Ann Colby
- Andy Devine as Pickle Bixby
- Brian Donlevy as Gil Warren
- Tom Brown as Bob O'Leary
- Berton Churchill as Senator Colby
- Sidney Blackmer as General Phil Sheridan
- J. Anthony Hughes (de) as Patrick O'Leary
- Paul Hurst as 'Mitch' Mitchell
- June Storey as Gretchen O'Leary
- Gene Reynolds as Young Dion
- Eddie Collins as Drunk
- Billy Watson as Young Jack
- Spencer Charters as Commissioner W.J. Beavers
- Rondo Hatton as Rondo
- Charles Lane as Booking Agent
- Francis Ford as Driver
- Gustav von Seyffertitz as Dutch
- Russell Hicks as Politician
- Scotty Mattraw as Beef King
- Larry Steers as Belle's Admirer (uncredited)
- Harry Tenbrook as Hub Patron (uncredited)

== Production and release ==
During preproduction, MGM had announced that Jean Harlow, who was under contract to that studio, would be lent to 20th Century Fox to star in the role of Belle Fawcett. Harlow's untimely death caused the part to go to Alice Faye. Faye's popularity skyrocketed as a result of the picture, and she was reunited with Power and Ameche that same year for Alexander's Ragtime Band, which proved to be even more successful.

Some sources claim that MGM offered to lenf both Harlow and Clark Gable to Fox for In Old Chicago if they reciprocated by lending Shirley Temple to MGM for their upcoming production of The Wizard of Oz. This is merely a rumor, though, as Harlow died in June 1937, several months before MGM had even purchased the rights to Oz. The railroad scenes were filmed on the Sierra Railroad in Tuolumne County, California.

The film was released and restored to its full length on DVD in 2005.

== Awards ==
The film was nominated for the Academy Award for Best Picture. Alice Brady won the Oscar for Best Actress in a Supporting Role. She was the first person to win the Supporting Oscar after being nominated in the prior year. The film was also nominated in the categories of Music (Scoring), Sound Recording (E. H. Hansen), and Writing (Original Story), and won for Assistant Director (Robert D. Webb).

== Historical accuracy ==
Despite crediting the Chicago Historical Society for assistance with historical research, much of the film is fictionalized. The area known as "the Patch" did exist as a predominantly Irish neighborhood and was associated with crime, as portrayed in the film. In the years before the film was made, it had been supplanted by the Levee, an area renowned for its corrupt politicians, known as the Gray Wolves, whose deeds resemble those of the characters in the film.

The portrayal of the O'Leary family is largely fictitious down to the names of the characters. Mrs. O'Leary's name was Catherine, not Molly. The O'Learys had two children, one son and one daughter. The movie depicts three sons; her only son was named James Patrick O'Leary. The daughter was named Anna. Their father Patrick O'Leary did not die in 1854 as a result of an accident involving his horses. He died in 1894. Mrs. O'Leary did not run her own "French Laundry" out of their house.

The mayor of Chicago in 1871 was Roswell B. Mason, not an O'Leary son. However, Mason was elected on a reform ticket like the fictional Jack and took similar measures to deal with the fire. Mrs. O'Leary's son James Patrick did achieve success as a gambler and saloon owner comparable to that of Dion in the film.

== See also ==
- List of firefighting films
