= George Mundelein =

American Catholic cardinal (1872–1939)

His Eminence George Mundelein
- Archbishop of Chicago
- Church: Catholic Church
- Archdiocese: Chicago
- Appointed: December 9, 1915
- Term ended: October 2, 1939
- Predecessor: James Edward Quigley
- Successor: Samuel Stritch
- Other post: Cardinal-Priest of Santa Maria del Popolo (1924–1939)
- Previous post: Auxiliary Bishop of Brooklyn (1909–1915)

Orders
- Ordination: June 8, 1895 by Charles Edward McDonnell
- Consecration: September 21, 1909 by Charles Edward McDonnell
- Created cardinal: March 24, 1924 by Pope Pius XI
- Rank: Cardinal-Priest

Personal details
- Born: July 2, 1872 New York City, U.S.
- Died: October 2, 1939 (aged 67) Mundelein, Illinois, U.S.
- Education: Manhattan College; Saint Vincent Seminary; Pontificio Collegio Urbano de Propaganda Fide
- Motto: Dominus adjutor meus (Latin for 'The Lord is my helper')
- Signature: George Mundelein's signature

- Coat of arms

George William Mundelein (July 2, 1872 – October 2, 1939) was an American Catholic prelate who served as Archbishop of Chicago from 1915 until his death in 1939. He was created a cardinal in 1924.

== Early life and education ==
George William Mundelein was born on July 2, 1872, at his parents' home on Avenue C in the Lower East Side of Manhattan in New York City. He was the only son of Francis and Mary (née Goetz) Mundelein. He had two sisters, Margaret and Catherine. Mundelein's maternal grandfather, Valentine Goetz, served in the 31st New York Infantry Regiment during the American Civil War and died at the Battle of Eltham's Landing in 1862.

Mundelein received his early education at the parochial school of St. Nicholas Kirche, a national parish for German Catholics in Manhattan. He then attended De La Salle Institute, where one of his classmates was Patrick Joseph Hayes (the future Archbishop of New York who would be created a cardinal alongside Mundelein in 1924). He and Hayes also attended Manhattan College, where Mundelein graduated with a Bachelor of Arts degree in 1889 at age 17. Mundelein was offered an appointment to the United States Naval Academy by President Grover Cleveland, but declined in order to study for the priesthood.

Mundelein won a scholarship for German-speaking candidates for the priesthood who would serve in the Diocese of Brooklyn, and subsequently entered St. Vincent Seminary in Latrobe, Pennsylvania. After graduating from St. Vincent's, he was too young to be ordained so Bishop Charles Edward McDonnell of Brooklyn sent him to Rome in 1892 to further his studies at the Pontifical Urban College for the Propagation of the Faith. At the Urban College, he received the degree of Doctor of Divinity.

== Priesthood ==
On June 8, 1895, Mundelein was ordained a priest in Rome by Bishop McDonnell, who was on an ad limina visit. He celebrated his first Mass the following day at Saint Peter's tomb in St. Peter's Basilica.

Upon his return to the United States in 1895, Mundelein was appointed an assistant secretary to Bishop McDonnell. In addition to that role, he carried out pastoral duties at the Lithuanian parish of St. Mary of the Angels Church in Brooklyn.

He served as chancellor of the Diocese of Brooklyn from 1897 to 1909. During this time, he was named a member of the Roman Liturgical Academy in 1903, a domestic prelate with the title of Monsignor in 1906, and a member of the Pontifical Academy of Arcadia in 1907.

== Auxiliary Bishop of Brooklyn ==
Coat of arms as Auxiliary Bishop of Brooklyn

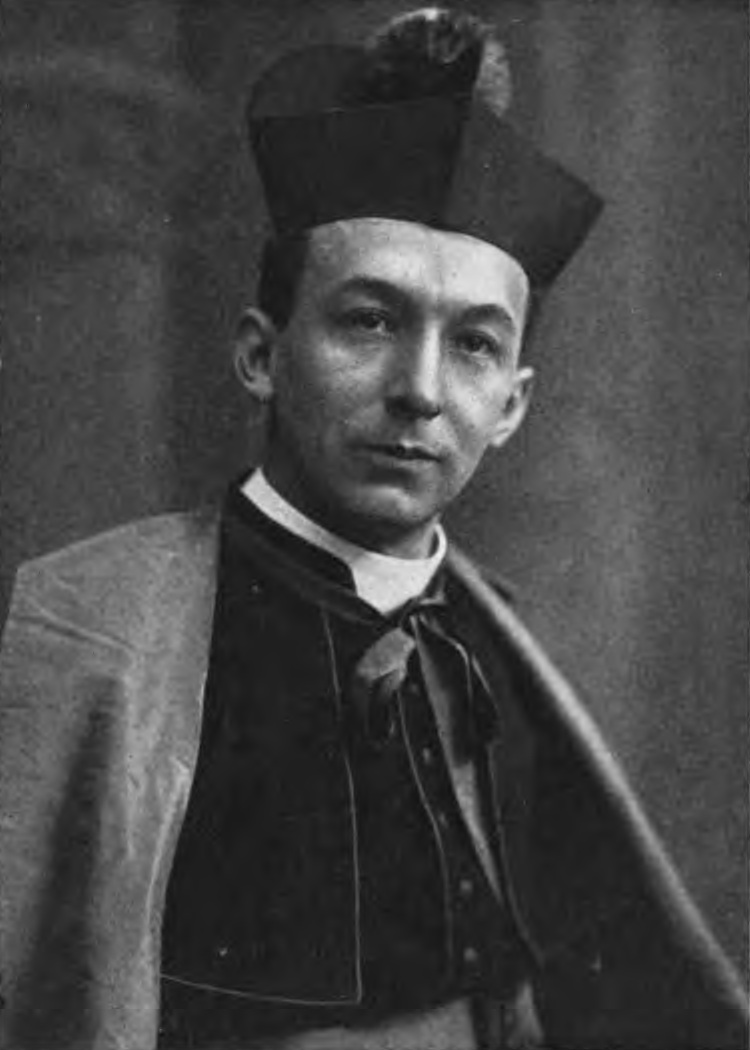
Mundelein as Auxiliary Bishop of Brooklyn

On June 30, 1909, Mundelein was appointed auxiliary bishop of Brooklyn and titular bishop of Loryma by Pope Pius X. He received his episcopal consecration on the following September 21 from Bishop McDonnell, with Bishops Charles H. Colton and John J. O'Connor serving as co-consecrators.

As auxiliary bishop, Mundelein erected Queen of All Saints Church to serve the Catholics of the cathedral parish. At the time, the cathedral was unfinished and parishioners worshiped in a small chapel; Queen of All Saints, which also housed a parochial school, was dedicated on Thanksgiving Day 1913. The following year, in 1914, he established Cathedral College of the Immaculate Conception, a minor seminary of the diocese.

== Archbishop of Chicago ==
Following the death of Archbishop James Edward Quigley in July 1915, the suffragan bishops and priests of the Archdiocese of Chicago submitted a terna, or list of three candidates, to succeed Quigley that included Bishops Edmund Dunne, Peter Muldoon, and Alexander McGavick. However, Pope Benedict XV did not select any of these candidates and instead appointed Mundelein as the third Archbishop of Chicago on December 9, 1915. The pope had originally intended to appoint Mundelein as Bishop of Buffalo, with the more experienced Bishop Dennis Dougherty becoming Archbishop of Chicago. However, the British government reportedly objected to having a bishop of German ancestry in Buffalo, so close to the Canadian border, during World War I. To placate them, Benedict XV named Dougherty to Buffalo and Mundelein to Chicago.

Mundelein was formally installed as archbishop on February 9, 1916, and was appointed an assistant at the pontifical throne on May 8, 1920.

The archdiocese greatly expanded its charity outreach during the Great Depression, rivaling the efforts of Chicago's Associated Jewish Charities. It established a city-wide network of St. Vincent de Paul Societies.

=== Poison plot 1916 ===
At a large dinner held at the University Club of Chicago on February 12, 1916, chef Jean Crones slipped arsenic into the soup. His intent was to poison Mundelein and over 100 other guests, including Illinois Governor Edward F. Dunne. However, the potency of the arsenic was reduced because the kitchen staff was forced to water down the soup to accommodate 50 extra guests.

As the diners started exhibiting symptoms of arsenic poisoning, a doctor at the event prepared a makeshift emetic that the victims could drink to promote vomiting. As he was dieting on the evening of the dinner, Mundelein ate only a bite or two of the soup and was unharmed. There were three fatalities, including Andrew J. Graham (a banker who had been a mayoral candidate in 1911). Newspapers later referred to the incident as the "Mundelein poison soup plot".

Police were unable to apprehend Crones after the supper. Their investigation revealed that his real name was Nestor Dondoglio and that he belonged to the Galleanist circle of anarchists.

=== Catholic schools ===
Almost half the Chicago population was Catholic by the 1920s. For decades, the parishes had been building and running their own schools, employing religious sisters as inexpensive teachers. The desire of some was that the language of instruction should match the ethnicity of the parish (with many Polish, and until World War II, many German parishioners popularly promoting that instruction, especially religious instruction, be provided in the language of their heritage). Whereas virtually every parish was required to operate its own elementary school, Mundelein felt that the parish priests were inadequate to supervise high schools and the highly qualified religious Orders that usually operated such schools. As a result, on taking office, Mundelein centralized control of the archdiocesan high schools and encouraged the closure of parish high schools in favor of new centralized high schools operated by a teaching religious Order. The archdiocesan building committee now picked the locations for new high schools while its school board standardized the school curricula, textbooks, teacher training, testing, and educational policies. As a result, fewer parish high schools existed within the Archdiocese of Chicago after the 1930s. Whereas many of the parish high schools were phased out at the time (notable exceptions that survived for decades afterwards included St. Francis de Sales High School; St. Gregory High School; and St. Procopius High School), and a slow process of closure that was only complete by the late 1960s began for the last of the parish high schools; permission was upheld from the opening of new parish high schools. Simultaneously he gained a voice in city hall, and Catholic William J. Bogan became superintendent of public schools.

== Cardinal ==
Pope Pius XI created Mundelein as cardinal-priest of the Basilica of Santa Maria del Popolo in Rome during the consistory of March 24, 1924. With his elevation, Chicago became the first archdiocese west of the Allegheny Mountains to have a cardinal. In 1926, Mundelein presided over the 28th International Eucharistic Congress in Chicago.

In 1933, the Vatican appointed Mundelein as judge for the apostolic process for Mother Frances Cabrini's cause for canonization.

Mundelein served as papal legate to the eighth National Eucharistic Congress in New Orleans, Louisiana, on September 13, 1938. He also served as a cardinal elector in the 1939 papal conclave that selected Pope Pius XII.

== Death ==
Mundelein died from heart disease in his sleep on October 2, 1939, in Mundelein, Illinois (a village renamed in his own honor 14 years prior to his death), at age 67. He is buried behind the main altar of the chapel at Mundelein Seminary, which was founded on his initiative.

== Views ==
=== Church and politics ===
Considered a liberal, Mundelein was a friend of US President Franklin D. Roosevelt and a supporter of Roosevelt's New Deal initiative. A staunch supporter of trade unions, Mundelein once remarked:

Selfish employers of labor have flattered the Church by calling it the great conservative force, and then called upon it to act as a police force while they paid but a pittance of wage to those who work for them. I hope that day has gone by. Our place is beside the workingman.

=== Film industry ===
Mundelein commented on the film industry in 1934, saying, "We don't like the Mae West type ... The kind of film in which Will Rogers, Janet Gaynor, and Victor Moore appear is what we have in mind."

=== Marriage ===
In 1935, Mundelein said "that not war, nor famine, nor pestilence have brought so much suffering and pain to the human race, as have hasty, ill-advised marriages, unions entered into without the knowledge, the preparation, the thought even an important commercial contract merits and receives. God made marriage an indissoluble contract, Christ made it a sacrament, the world today has made it a plaything of passion, an accompaniment of sex, a scrap of paper to be torn up at the whim of the participants." He was an outspoken opponent of artificial contraception.

=== Ethnic groups ===
During his tenure in Chicago, Mundelein launched an effort to unify ethnic Catholic groups such as the Poles and Italians into territorial, instead of ethnic, parishes with mixed success. St. Monica's parish, however, was endorsed by Mundelein as the city's sole black parish, leading to distaste for the archbishop in both the early 1900s and today. After constructing the landmark Archbishop Quigley Preparatory Seminary in Chicago, Mundelein built St. Mary of the Lake Seminary, later renamed Mundelein Seminary in his honor, in what is now Mundelein, Illinois. Quigley Seminary was the site of Mundelein's 1937 "paper hanger" speech, criticizing German Chancellor Adolf Hitler and other Nazi leaders. He also organized the construction of other churches in the see, such as the Saint Philip Neri church and the Corpus Christi Church, both designed by Chicago architect Joseph W. McCarthy. He publicly sparred with the Father Charles Coughlin, the Detroit Catholic priest who broadcast anti-banking and anti-Semitic views to millions of radio listeners until he was forced off the air in 1939.

== See also ==
- Mundelein College
- Mundelein, Illinois
- Paper hanger (Mundelein's speech)
- List of covers of Time magazine (1920s) – May 31, 1926
- History of education in Chicago

Catholic Church titles
Preceded by James Edward Quigley	Archbishop of Chicago; 1915–1939	Succeeded by Samuel Stritch
Preceded by –	Auxiliary Bishop of Brooklyn; 1909–1915	Succeeded by –
