= Andrew J. Graham (banker) =

- Born: Circa. 1861; Chicago, United States
- Died: May 1, 1916 (aged 54–55); Chicago
- Occupations: Banker, local politician
- Known for: Death through poisoning
- Spouse: Minnie Padden Graham

Andrew J. Graham was a Chicago banker (founder and head of Graham & Sons). He was an unsuccessful contender for the Democratic nomination in the 1911 Chicago mayoral election.

Graham died at the age of 55 on May 1, 1916; weeks after having been poisoned at a dinner celebrating the enthronement of George Mundelein as the archbishop of Chicago. At the time of his death, Graham & Sons was the largest private banking institution in the American Midwest.

== Early life ==
Graham was born into a family that traced its Chicago roots to the city's early years.

== Banking career ==
Graham was the founder and of Graham & Sons, a private bank he founded circa 1889. At the time of his death in mid-1916, the bank was the largest private banking institution in the American Midwest. However, the year after his death, on June 29, 1917, the bank closed its doors after a bank run resulted in heavy withdrawals of liberty bonds. Its 1917 closure drew national attention.

The titular "sons" in the bank's name were his sons Frank and Andrew, who were also involved in the bank's operations.

Graham's bank made him one of the best-known private bankers in the United States at the time of his death.

The bank was involved in selling construction bonds that funded the final iteration of the Morrison Hotel. In January 1916, allegations were printed in newspapers that Police Captain Morgan A. Collins had brought lax police enforcement to establishments within the hotel due to his political ties to Graham, as Collins had been a donor to Graham's mayoral campaign several years prior and was widely understood to be Graham's choice for Chicago police chief if he had been elected mayor.

== 1911 mayoral candidacy ==
Graham was prominently involved in the local Democratic Party. In 1911, he ran for mayor of Chicago with the backing of Roger Charles Sullivan and his political machine. Many council Gray Wolves joined Sullivan in backing his candidacy.

A key component of Graham's campaign platform was a promise to cut city spending in order to enable tax cuts.

In early February, betting odds offered by James Patrick O'Leary heavily anticipated Graham to win the Democratic primary. However, he faced an onslaught of attacks from his opponents over his ties to Sullivan, and his support severely subsided in the closing weeks of the campaign.

== Death ==
Graham was one of three to die after a chef deliberately poisoned the soup served at a February 12, 1916 University Club of Chicago dinner honoring the enthronement of George Mundelein as the archbishop of Chicago. Mundelein was dieting on the evening of the dinner, and did not eat the soup. Police investigation identified the chef who had poisoned the food. While the chef had gone by the name "Jean Crones", he was found to really be named Nestor Dondoglio and belonged to the Galleanist circle of anarchists, and additionally held anti-religious sentiments. While Dondoglio was indicted, he was never apprehended. After being poisoned, Graham remained sick for several weeks, and succumbed to this on May 1 at his residence on the West Side of Chicago. The reasons cited for his death included complications related to kidney problems and heart disease. He was 55 years of age. Newspapers such as the Omaha Daily Bee regarded Graham to be among the most notable internationally known figures in the banking profession to die in the year 1916. Graham's will left the entirety of his $3 million estate to his widow.

Both Graham and his wife carried large life insurance policies. Graham's large policy resulted in his beneficiaries receiving an insurance payment of $434,599 after his death. This was a significant sum, being the fourth-largest single-life insurance payment made by United States insurance companies in 1916. It was one of only sixteen single-life insurance payments of $250,000 or more to be made by United States companies in 1916.

== Personal life and family ==
Graham's wife, Minnie Padden Graham, involved herself in advocating for women's suffrage and women holding more political offices.

One of Graham's sons, Joseph W. Graham Sr., married Eleanor Duffy, the daughter of prominent Chicago construction magnate Joseph J. Duffy. Joseph W. Graham Sr. and Eleanor D. Graham's son, Joseph W. Graham Jr. (1922–2002), was a real estate businessman and politician in Anchorage, Alaska (where he moved in the 1950s), who served in the Anchorage Assembly (city council) in the 1970s.

Another of Graham's sons, Ralph Richard Graham, married Ethel Lorimer (the daughter of U.S. Senator William Lorimer) in 1911.

Another of Graham's sons was Jarlath John Graham Sr., who married Isabel Corboy and had four children: sons John Waller, Jarlath John Jr. (also known as "Jack"), and daughter Isabelle. Jarlath Jr. worked in news publishing in Chicago, serving as an editor of Advertising Age from 1954 to 1975. He worked as editorial department executive and an executive of Crain between 1975 and 1985. He was married to Elizabeth Carlson, who had worked as head librarian at Advertising Age. Isabelle, who worked as a journalist for The Washington Star, married newspaperman Willard E. Shelton and adopted his surname.
