= 1911 Chicago mayoral election =

- April 4, 1911
- Turnout: 87% ▲1 pp
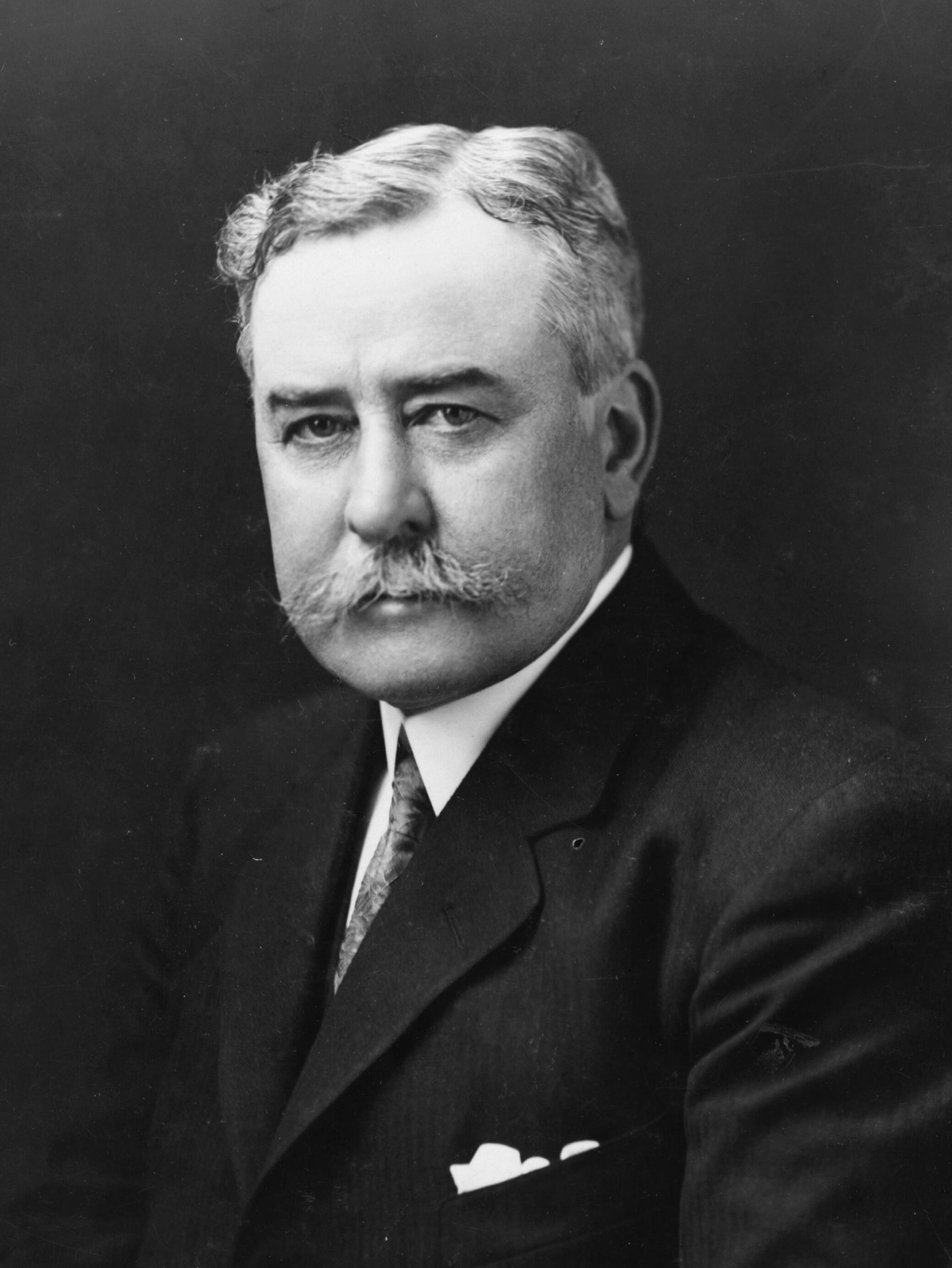

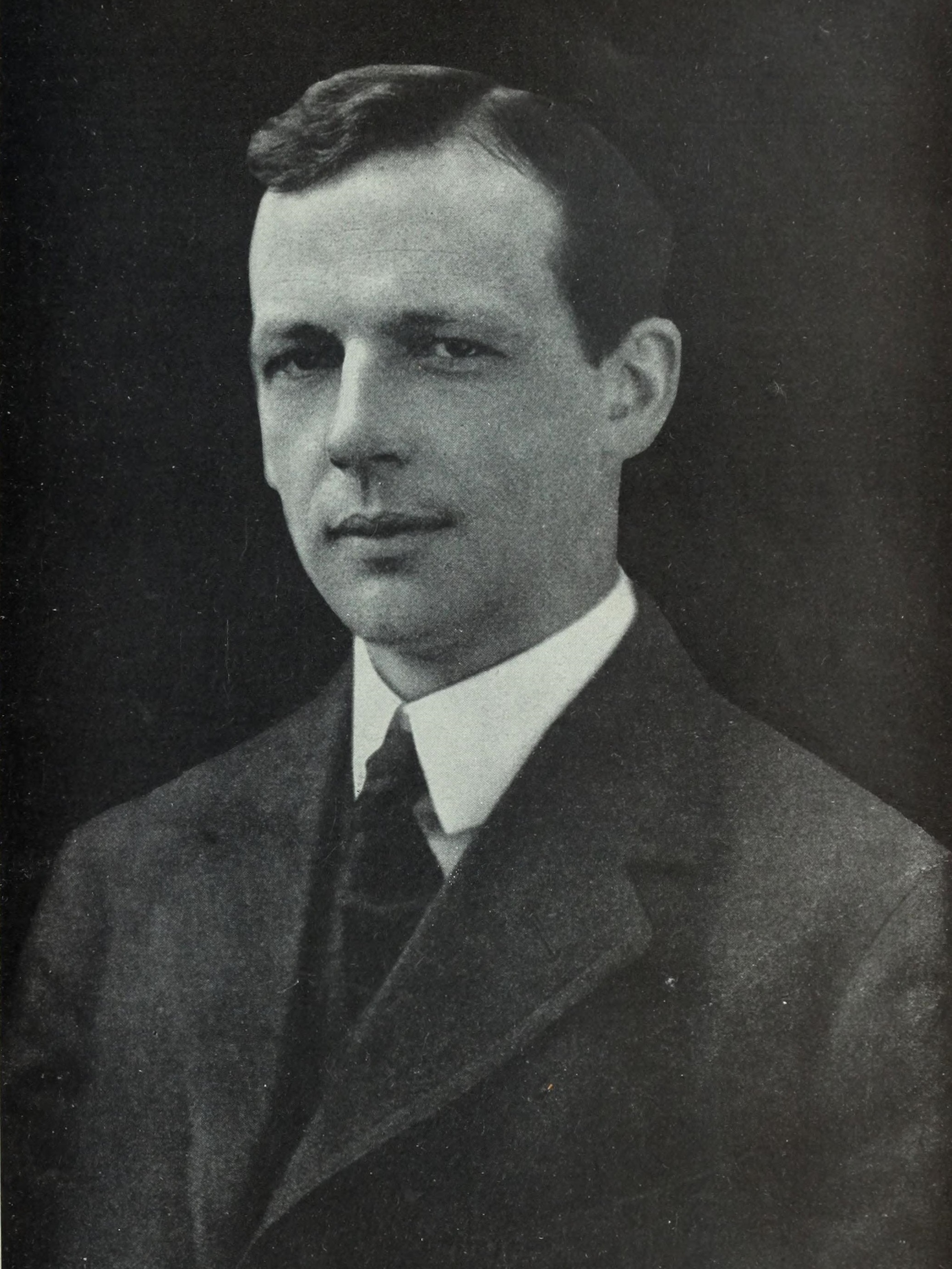

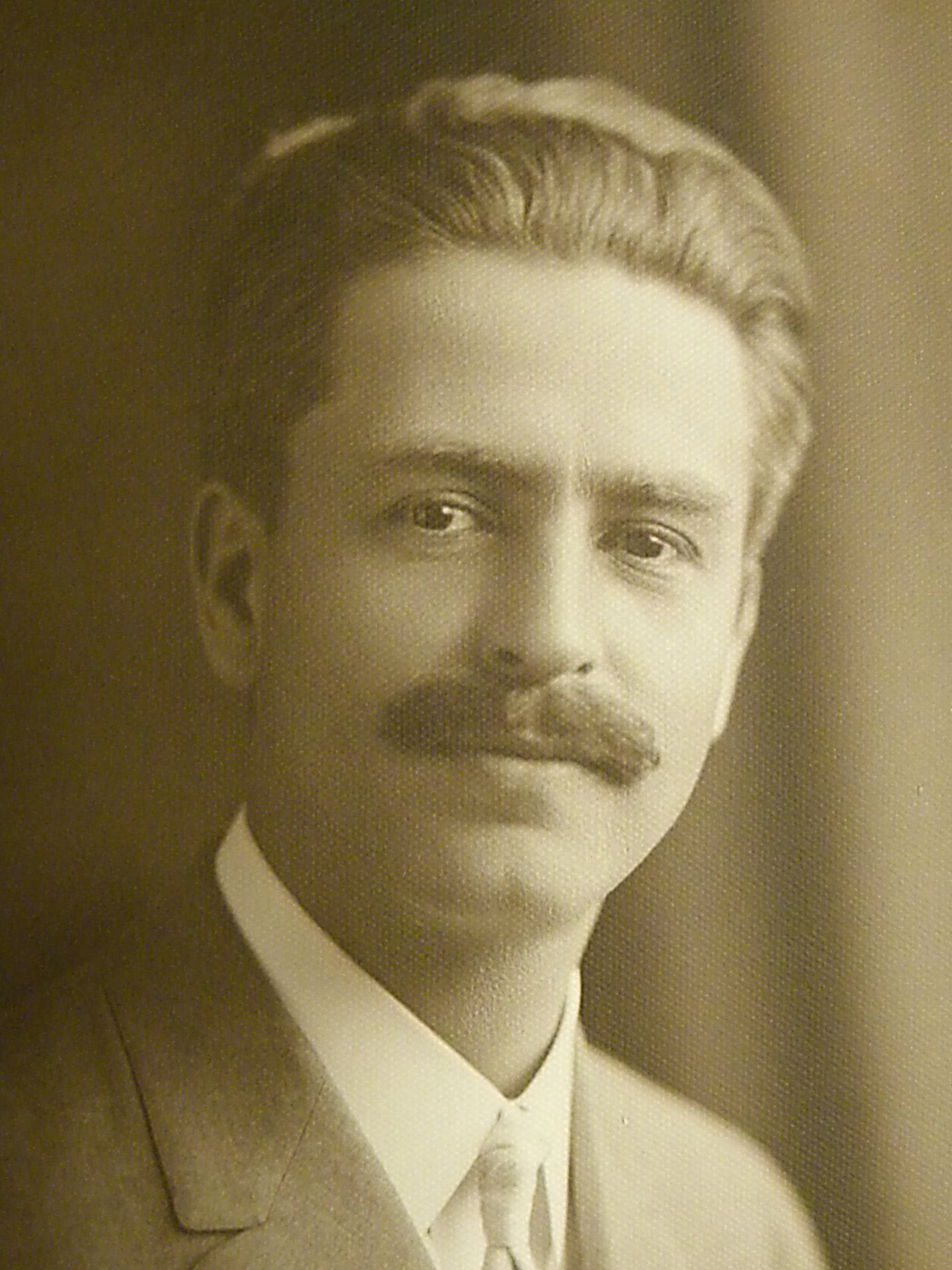
Nominee	Carter Harrison IV	Charles E. Merriam	William E. Rodriguez
Party	Democratic	Republican	Socialist
Popular vote	177,997	160,672	24,825
Percentage	48.53%	43.81%	6.77%
Mayor before election
Fred A. Busse
Republican
Elected mayor
Carter Harrison IV
Democratic

In the 1911 Chicago mayoral election, Democrat Carter Harrison IV was elected to his fifth non-consecutive term as mayor, tying the then-record set by his father Carter Harrison Sr. for the most Chicago mayoral election victories. Harrison defeated Republican nominee Charles E. Merriam and Socialist nominee William E. Rodriguez.

The election was held on April 4.

On February 28, 1911, for the first time, direct primary elections were held. Both major parties held primaries to determine their nominees, and both the Democratic and Republican primaries saw heated races. In the Democratic primary, former mayor Harrison won a very narrow 0.97% margin of victory over former mayor Edward F. Dunne, and also beating a competitive candidacy by banker Andrew J. Graham. With incumbent Republican mayor Fred A. Busse declining to seek a second term, the Republican Party also had an open race for its nomination. Charles E. Merriam won a strong victory over restaurateur John R. Thompson and former Illinois treasurer John F. Smulski, as well as two minor candidates.

== Holding of direct primaries ==
Ahead of the election, Illinois adopted a law to hold direct primary elections for public offices in the state. Illinois law changes scheduled for such primary elections to be held on the last Tuesday of February in the case of Chicago's municipal elections. Being the first Chicago mayoral election held since the law change, the Democratic and Republican primaries were the first direct primary elections for Chicago mayor. The primaries were tense, and even elicited incidents of election-day violence. All parties held their primaries on February 28, 1911.

== Democratic primary ==
Carter Harrison IV, who had previously served four terms as mayor, defeated former mayor Edward F. Dunne as well as Andrew J. Graham (a wealthy banker) in the Democratic primary on February 28. Harrison's margin of victory in the primary was very narrow.

=== Candidates in the Democratic primary ===
Ran

- Edward Fitzsimmons Dunne, former mayor (1905–07)
- Andrew J. Graham, banker
- Carter Harrison IV, former mayor (1897–1905)

Speculated candidates that did not run

- Fred W. Blocki, former city treasurer (1905–1907)
- John T. Connery
- Henry Gibbons
- Charles F. Gunther, former alderman
- Lockwood Honoré
- Ernst Hummel, former city treasurer (1903–1906)
- J. Hamilton Lewis, former Chicago corporation counsel (1905–1907) and former member of the United States House of Representatives from Washington at-large (1897–1899)
- Charles J. Vopicka, diplomat
- Charles H. Wacker, chairman of the Chicago Plan Commission

=== Harrison's primary campaign ===
Harrison had, in late 1910, formed a political alliance with William Randolph Hearst. Their mutual interest was that they both sought to oust political boss Roger Charles Sullivan and his network.

The platforms of the candidates did not heavily differ on substance. The primary was heavily centered upon personal attacks between opponents. In its (biased) coverage, Hearst's Examiner emphasized Graham's connection with Sullivan, who the paper caricatured and portrayed as a villain. The Examiner reported on and exaggerated Sullivan's involvement with the local utility trust People's Gas Light & Coke Company, and claimed that Graham was running to simply keep gas prices high. Harrison used this narrative too, calling Sullivan the "gas dictator". Harrison declared himself to be the "Anti-Roger C. Sullivan and Anti-Gas candidate". He proclaimed that "Roger Sullivan is not a Democrat" and that neither was Graham. Harrison's supporters went to great lengths to describe Sullivan as an immense villain.

Harrison and Graham were the only two candidates in either major party decline to allow a committee appointed by the Municipal Voters' League and Chicago Federation of Labor to audit their campaign accounts.

With Graham's support subsiding in the closing weeks of the campaign, Harrison refocused his messaging to focus on convincing Democrats that he had strong electability for the general election. He also used promises of patronage to his advantage, and seized on late reports that part of Sullivan's coalition was shifting their support to Dunne painting Dunne as being tied to Sullivan.

=== Dunne's campaign ===
Dunne announced his candidacy on November 19, 1910. His candidacy came as somewhat of a surprise, as his chances of winning appeared unrealistic. However, he had a few factors that were still to his advantage. One was that he had strong support among the city's Irish middle class. Another was that he was a reform-minded politician in an election year in which reform seemed important to voters. Shortly after he announced his candidacy, he received backing from reformist figures such as alderman John J. Bradley (who would serve as manager of his campaign), William Emmett Dever, Margaret Haley, Clarence Darrow, and Raymond Robins. Dunne's platform called for improving service and lowering the prices of gas and electricity, nighttime waste collection, universal transfers, the construction of city-owned subways, a consolidation of Chicago and Cook County, and the creation of parks administrations. He also pledged to root out graft, bomb throwing. He pledged to instill a government which emphasized, "decency towards and fair treatment of the citizen from public officials". He would adopt "wet" stance, opposing prohibition of alcohol. While Dunne's campaign had an invigorated launch, receiving the support many reformist endorsers, most of the press and political professionals still disregarded his prospects.

Dunne, while for much of the race having not been widely covered by the press and largely ignored by his opponents, attacked both Harrison and Graham. He accused Harrison of sabotaging his reelection campaign in 1907, and called Graham a puppet of Sullivan, who he claimed had also for sabotaged his reelection campaign in 1907 . After weeks of the press and both of his opponents largely disregarding him, Dunne's candidacy had begun to gain momentum, and the race began to move in his favor. Dunne secured the endorsement of the Chicago Federation of Labor.

In the closing weeks of the race, there were some reports that Graham was losing supporters to Dunne. Around this time, Dunne ceased attacks on Graham and Roger Sullivan in his stump speeches. He focused his campaign instead on appealing to reformist sentiments that had been strengthened by the scandals of Busse's administration and the scandals of William Lorimer.

=== Graham's campaign ===
Andrew J. Graham announce his candidacy on December 9, 1910. was backed by Roger Charles Sullivan. He, in essence, ran as Sullivan's hand-picked candidate. Graham was a prominent banker from the city's West Side, who was a longtime friend and associate of Sullivan's. Graham was known for acts of philanthropy which had earned him popularity in his locality of the city. With no political record, it was difficult for opponents to make political attacks on him. Graham's platform placed a focus on eliminating graft, pointing specifically to kinds of graft which incumbent mayor Busse's administration had been disgraced by. He also advocated a consolidation of Chicago and Cook County (something that would have served the political interests of Sullivan). He wanted subways and universal transfers. He supported "personal liberty", which was a euphemistic way of saying that he supported protecting access to alcoholic drinks. Less than a week after he declared his candidacy, Graham received the formal endorsement of the Democratic Party of Cook County Committee. He received 63 votes from the 84 members who were present at the vote (former Cook County sheriff John E. Traeger had received two votes and Harrison received no votes, and fourteen abstentions were made). Graham's official campaign manager was Thomas F. Flynn.

Graham ran an extensive billboard advertising campaign, utilizing as many as 3,000 billboards. At first, most of his billboards used simple slogans such as "No Graft at the City Hall" and "A Seat for Every Pupil in the Public Schools". Eventually, the campaign began using former Hearst quotes and cartoons from 1904 (when Harrison had opposed Hearst's presidential campaign) that vilified Harrison. A key component of Graham's campaign platform was a promise to cut city spending in order to enable tax cuts.

Graham received a celebrity endorsement from world heavyweight boxing champion Jack Johnson. Many council Gray Wolves joined Sullivan in backing his candidacy.

Graham and Harrison were the only two candidates in either major party to decline to allow a committee appointed by the Municipal Voters' League and Chicago Federation of Labor to audit their campaign accounts.

Sullivan, in an attempt to directly counter attacks by Hearst and Harrison centered on him, for the first time in two decades delivered stump speeches. This broke his longtime policy of not delivering public speeches.

While he started his campaign in a strong position, in the closing weeks of the race, Graham's odds of winning greatly subsided. There were even some reports that members of Sullivan's own coalition were quietly changing their support over to Dunne's campaign.

=== Betting odds given for Democratic primary ===
The betting odds at James Patrick O'Leary's betting house, which had originally been 4-5 for Graham, 8-5 for Harrison, and 5-2 for Dunne, had changed to 3-5 for Graham, 9-5 for Harrison and 7-7 for Dunne. By Election Day, Harrison and Dunne were seen as the only two candidates with chances of winning the primary.

=== Results of Democratic primary ===
The initial result was so narrow, with a 1,420 vote margin of victory of Harrison, that Dunne requested a recount. A recount was held, with Harrison remaining the victor.

Democratic primary
Party	Candidate	Votes	%
Democratic	Carter Harrison IV	55,116	36.94
Democratic	Edward Fitzsimmons Dunne	53,696	35.98
Democratic	Andrew J. Graham	38,578	25.85
Write-ins	Other	1,829	1.23
Total votes		149,219	100

== Republican primary ==
=== Candidates in the Republican primary ===
- Charles E. Merriam, member of the Chicago City Council (1909–1911) and academic
- Tom Murray
- John Edward Scully
- John F. Smulski, former Illinois Treasurer
- John R. Thompson, restaurant businessman

=== Mayor Busse's decision to forgo re-election ===
Incumbent mayor Fred A. Busse did not seek a second term. Despite the high hopes some supporters had for him, Busse's term had been rather uneventful in regards to achievements. Additionally, Busse's administration was plagued by allegations of graft. Busse reportedly believed that he would be able to defeat Merriam in the primary, but did not believe that he could beat a Democratic opponent in the general election.

=== Republican primary campaigns ===
Harold L. Ickes convinced Merriam to run for mayor and managed his campaign. Merriam's campaign was financially supported by Julius Rosenwald, and Victor Lawson.

Educator and politician Charles E. Merriam (a strong proponent of progressivism) defeated a number of candidates, including restaurateur John R. Thompson and John F. Smulski (former state treasurer). Smulski was considered to be a leader in the city's Polish community, and received the backing of Governor Charles Deneen. Thompson was regarded to be a notable businessman.

Merriam was seen as a natural heir to receive the support of Busse's political base. He ran on a campaign calling for clean and efficient government rooted in "Progressive Republicanism" based on "the value of conservation as applied to municipal affairs as in the relation to state and national interests". He aimed to launch "a straight challenge to the graft system, spoils system, and the special privilege system". Some of Dunne's reformist colleagues backed this Republican candidate over their Dunne, including Raymond Robins who campaigned extensively on his behalf. The Chicago Federation of Labor endorsed him for the Republican nomination. Merriam benefited from a reformist sentiment that had been fed by revelations of municipal corruption that he had played a large role in originally uncovering.

=== Results of Republican primary ===
Republican primary
Party	Candidate	Votes	%
Republican	Charles E. Merriam	53,089	47.95
Republican	John R. Thompson	26,406	23.85
Republican	John F. Smulski	23,138	20.90
Republican	Tom Murray	2,799	2.53
Republican	John Edward Scully	1,052	0.95
Write-in	Others	4,237	3.83
Total votes		110,721	100

== Prohibition primary ==
The Prohibition Party nominated William A. Brubaker, its 1907 mayoral nominee and the chairman of the Prohibition Central Committee of Cook County.

Probation primary
Party	Candidate	Votes	%
Prohibition	William A. Brubaker	433	100
Total votes		433	100

== Socialist primary ==
William E. Rodriguez (a member of the Chicago City Council) received the Socialist nomination.

Socialist primary
Party	Candidate	Votes	%
Socialist	William E. Rodriguez	2,143	100
Total votes		2,143	100

== General election ==
Both the Democratic and Republican Party had been divided by their contentious primaries.

The general election was contentious.

For his 1911 campaign, Harrison adopted many progressive policies. The reform proposals which Harrison put forth were easily understood. "We plan to wage this fight on the theory that public utility corporations should be our servants instead of our masters. I believe that the gas company can sell its products not more than 70 cents for 1000 cubic feet." He also championed the Burnham Plan of Chicago. He portrayed himself as a pragmatic and experienced change-maker and Merriam as an overly-idealistic and bookish professor.

To ward off potential immigrant support for Merriam, Harrison accused him of being a prohibitionist (a stance that was unpopular in the city's immigrant communities). While Merriam was well connected to the "dry" side of the debate over alcohol, as a mayoral candidate he tried to frame his position on the matter as being more about home rule and democracy than an outright support of implementing such laws. He claimed to be opposed to blue laws, and said that he would respect the will of the people of Chicago as mayor, which he recognized as being overwhelmingly opposed to prohibition.

Allegations surfaced that Merriam had been a member of the Hyde Park Protective Association, which was anti saloons and had also earned a strongly anti-African American reputation. Merriam denied these allegations.

Due to Merriam's strong reformist views, many Republican machine operatives of political boss Lorimer had worked to strengthen Harrison's bid, sabotaging their own party's nominee.

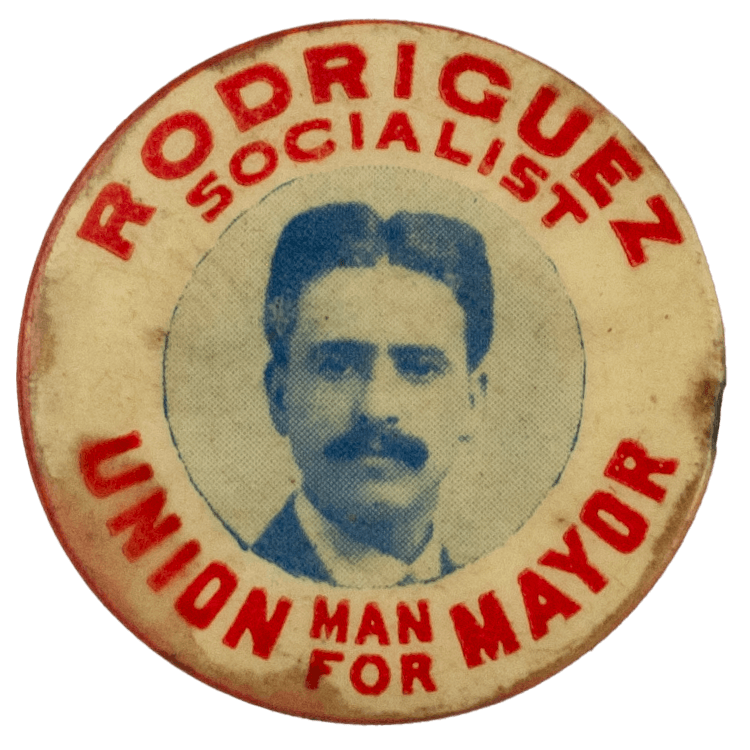
Rodriguez for Mayor pin, 1911

Socialist candidate William E. Rodriguez pledged that as mayor, he would focus on, “the problems of the working class,” which he stated included, “comfortable and sanitary dwellings at low cost” and “adequate street car service in the working-class districts.” He also pledged to pursue and an efficient health department, fair pay, and for the public schools to be open for public meetings.

=== Results of general election ===
Harrison was able to win a relatively-narrow victory. Merriam returned to the board of aldermen in 1913.

1911 Chicago mayoral election (general election)
Party	Candidate	Votes	%
Democratic	Carter Harrison IV	177,997	48.53
Republican	Charles E. Merriam	160,673	43.81
Socialist	William E. Rodriguez	24,825	6.77
Prohibition	William Brubaker	2,239	0.61
Socialist Labor	Anthony Prince	1,053	0.29
Turnout		366,787	87

According to polls, Harrison received 68.91% of the Polish-American vote, while Merriam received 24.40% and Rodriguez received 5.60%.

== Works cited ==
- Merriner, James (2004). Grafters and Goo Goos: Corruption and Reform in Chicago, 1833-2003. Southern Illinois University Press. ISBN 0809325713.
