= Jarlath J. Graham =

American magazine editor

Jarlath John Graham Jr. (d. 1998) was an American magazine editor who for 35 years worked for the publishing company Crain, including as editor of Advertising Age during the 1950s, 1960s, and 1970s. He lived and worked in the city of Chicago.

== Early life, family, and education ==
Graham was the son of Jarlath John Graham Sr. and Isabel Corboy Graham. His siblings were brother John Waller Graham and sister Isabelle Shelton (née Graham). Graham was often known by the nickname "Jack". Graham's forebears had resided in Chicago since the late-19th century. He was a paternal grandson of Andrew J. Graham (the late Chicago banker and politician) and Minnie Padden Graham.

Graham graduated from the University of Chicago in 1949, with a Bachelor of Arts degree. Afterwards, he briefly attended the University of Chicago Law School, but did not finish.

== Career ==
Graham worked in trade magazine publishing at the Crain publishing company for 35 years. His work at Crain began in 1950, soon after withdrawing from law school. He worked as the managing editor of Advertising Age from 1954–69, and editor from 1969–75. The Chicago Tribune obituary for Graham credited him with having helped, "transform the weekly into an influential, hard-hitting trade publication which became known as the bible of the advertising industry". A similar sentiment was included in obituaries by other leading newspapers, including The Washington Post. During the 1960s, the magazine became the most influential advertising trade magazine. During that decade, many advertising and marketing firms followed the practices its editorial board recommended. During his tenure in this role, the magazine also expanded its coverage of United States federal politics and the federal government's increasing regulation of the advertising industry.

In June 1968, Advertising Age's editorial board drew controversy and generated significant discussion about gun control in the United States after it ran an editorial headlined "Guns Must Go" in reaction to the assassination of Robert F. Kennedy.

In 1975, Graham began working as director of the editorial department of Crain, a role that was newly-established to coordinate the company's rapidly growing trade and business publication portfolio. He held an additional title as Publisher of Crain Books. In May 1977, he was given a promotion to Vice President In Charge Of Communications and Editorial Development, a title which incorporated many of the existing duties he had overseen for the previous two years. Graham also authored a marketing column for its Crain's Chicago Business publication. He retired in 1985.

Graham was involved in marketing trade associations, including the Advertising Club of Chicago and the American Business Press. He was also involved in marketing education, including serving on the board of the James Webb Young Foundation (a nonprofit aiding advertising students at the University of Illinois).

== Personal life and death ==
Graham married Elizabeth Carlson, who had worked as head librarian at Advertising Age. He was widowed in 1987. For decades, he and his family lived on Chicago's North Side.

Graham died of liver cancer at Evanston, Illinois' Wagner Health Center on January 24, 1998 at the age of 78.
