= William E. Rodriguez =

American lawyer (1879–1970)

Rodriguez c. 1917

William Emilio Rodriguez (September 15, 1879 – July 6, 1970) was an American socialist politician and lawyer. A founding member of the Chicago chapter of the American Civil Liberties Union, Rodriguez is best remembered as the first Hispanic individual elected to the Chicago City Council.

== Biography ==
=== Early years ===
William (christened Eldritus) Emilio Rodriguez was born in Naperville, Illinois on September 15, 1879. His father, Emilio, was a Spaniard who worked as a laborer and his mother, of ethnic German extraction, was born in Germany.

Rodriguez attended public schools and worked as a house painter following his graduation from high school.

He later entered law school, graduating from John Marshall Law School in 1912 and joining a small firm in Chicago. He was the first Hispanic graduate of the John Marshall Law School.

Rodriguez married Sophia V. Levitin and was the brother-in-law of radical journalist J. Louis Engdahl, who was married to another Levitin sister.

=== Political career ===
Rodriguez joined the Socialist Party of America from shortly after his graduation of high school.

Rodriguez made a first unsuccessful attempt at winning election to the Chicago City Council in April 1910, running in Ward 20 as part of a slate of 35 Socialist candidates. Only 324 votes were recorded for Rodriguez in this inaugural effort.

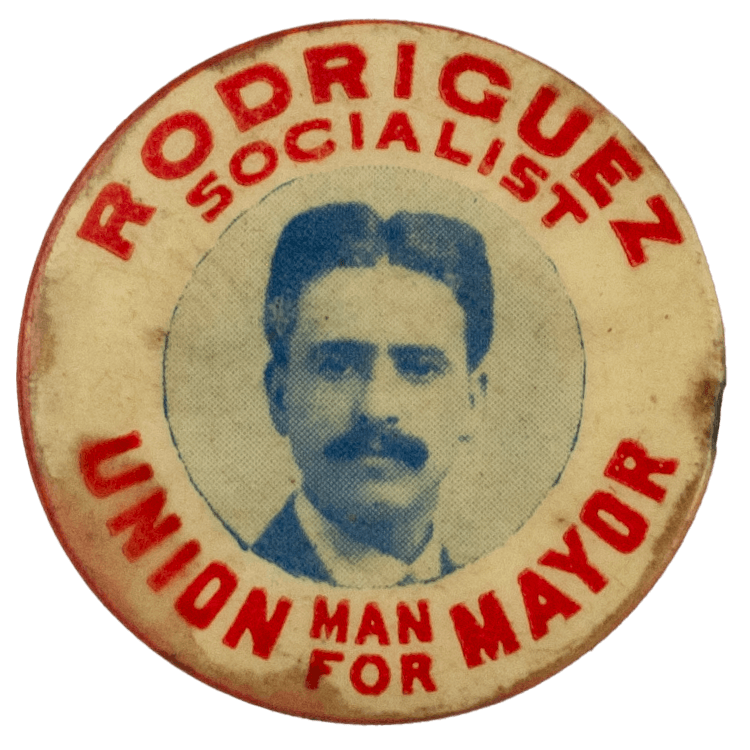
Rodriguez for Mayor pin, 1911

In April 1911, Rodriguez was the Socialist candidate for Mayor of Chicago. In this race he garnered slightly less than 25,000 votes, trailing the major party candidates by over 135,000 each.

Rodriguez moved into the 15th Ward of Chicago, located in the city's northwest, and ran for Chicago City Council in 1914. While Rodriguez lost, the Republican victor of that election died soon afterwards triggering a special election in 1915 to fill the now-vacant seat. Rodriguez announced his candidacy in the special election, and won the race for the remainder of the term with a plurality, as did fellow Socialist John C. Kennedy in the 27th Ward. Rodriguez was subsequently was reelected to a full term in 1916. Rodriguez was the first Hispanic member of the Chicago City Council.

As a Chicago City Council member, Rodriguez targeted the city's transit companies, which he charged were making exorbitant profits and billing the public for unnecessary "public service messages" in the press.

Rodriguez was targeted in the 1918 City Council race in the climate of anti-Socialist nationalism and the Republicans and Democrats in his ward united behind a "fusion" candidate, who won by 266 votes. Rodriguez was defeated by Oscar H. Olsen, a Republican running with Democratic support, owing to socialist opposition to American involvement in World War I.

In 1918, Rodriguez became involved in the Labor Party of Cook County, a forerunner of the Labor Party of the United States. He subsequently left the Socialist movement.

=== Later life ===
After his defeat in 1918. Rodriguez ran for Illinois Attorney General in 1920 on the Farmer–Labor Party's ticket and served on the party's executive committee during the same period. He served on the Farmer Labor party's executive committee He helped to establish the Chicago chapter of the American Civil Liberties Union and ran unsuccessfully for judge in 1933.

Rodriguez continued to practice law until he was in his late-80s. After his retirement, Rodriguez moved to Phoenix, Arizona.

=== Death and legacy ===
William E. Rodriguez died in Phoenix, Arizona on July 6, 1970.
