= James Patrick O'Leary =

Chicago gambling boss and saloon owner (1869–1925)

- Born: 1869; Chicago, Illinois
- Died: January 23, 1925 (aged 56); Chicago, Illinois
- Occupation(s): Gambling czar, amusement park manager
- Spouse: Anna Ryan
- Children: 2 sons, 3 daughters
- Parent(s): Patrick and Catherine O'Leary

James Patrick O'Leary (1869 – January 22, 1925) was a gambling boss and saloon owner in Chicago. His parents were Patrick and Irish-born Catherine O'Leary, in whose barn the Great Chicago Fire is alleged to have begun.

== Biography ==
O'Leary was born at 137 DeKoven Street, the house in which his family lived and where the Great Chicago Fire would start two years later.

O'Leary worked for the local bookies when he was a teenager, and eventually, he began as a bookmaker himself in Long Beach, Indiana, an off-track betting resort. However, he soon went bankrupt and worked at the Union Stock Yards, where he gained the nickname "Big Jim." In the early 1890s, he left the Stock Yards and opened a saloon on Halsted Street which included Victorian Turkish baths, a restaurant, a billiard room, and a bowling alley. He also posted detailed race track results and other betting information near the entrance to the Stock Yards. O'Leary soon began operating a pool hall and book parlor in the rear of the saloon. He became one of the leading gamblers in Chicago and was known for taking bets on everything from presidential candidates to changes in the weather.

In 1904, O'Leary began operating illegal gambling on Lake Michigan aboard the steamship The City of Traverse. Without police protection, this venture had failed by 1907 because of police raids each time the ship docked. O'Leary refused to bribe the police and instead had his saloon protected by adding a set of iron and zinc layered oak doors which allegedly were "fireproof, bomb-proof, and police-proof". Following Chicago crime lord Michael Cassius McDonald's death that year, O'Leary took over complete control of gambling on Chicago's southwest side around the Union Stock Yards. In the summer of 1907, Luna Park opened with O'Leary the principal owner. The popular park operated for four years before permanently closing.

O'Leary, who delivered whiskey to Colosimo's Cafe under an arrangement with Johnny Torrio, was suspected of involvement in the May 11, 1920 murder of James Colosimo, but no charges were brought against him. By the time of his death, O'Leary had become a millionaire several times over.

Despite numerous raids by police, O'Leary was found guilty of gambling only one time during his thirty-year career. The perception was that O'Leary, along with gambling bosses Mont Tennes and "Hot Stove" Jimmy Quinn, controlled the Chicago Police.

O'Leary married Annie McLaughlin, whose family lived next to the O'Learys at the time of the fire. They were the parents of two sons and three daughters.

James Patrick O'Leary died in Chicago of natural causes at the age of 56 on January 23, 1925.
