= Great Chicago Fire =

1871 conflagration in Illinois, US

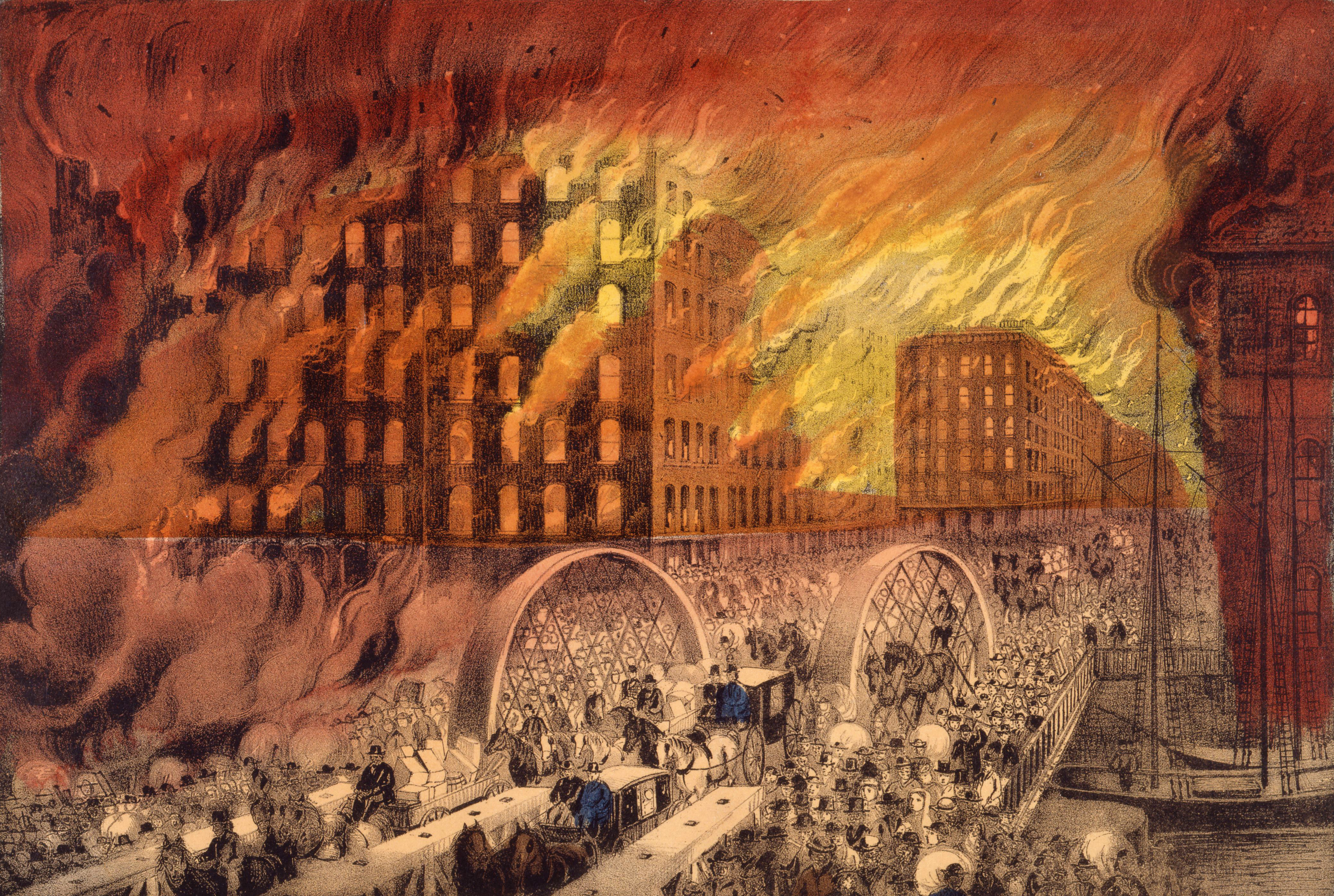
- An artist's rendering of the fire, by Currier and Ives. The view faces northeast across the Randolph Street Bridge.
- Date: October 8, 1871 – October 10, 1871
- Location: Chicago, Illinois, United States
- Coordinates: 41.8693°N 87.6418°W

Statistics
- Burned area: 2,112 acres (8.55 km^{2})

Impacts
- Deaths: 300 (estimate)
- Structures destroyed: 17,501 buildings
- Cost: $222 million, equivalent to $5.97 billion in 2025

Ignition
- Cause: Unknown

The Great Chicago Fire burned in Chicago, Illinois, United States, during October 8–10, 1871. The fire killed approximately 300 people, destroyed 17,000 structures across roughly 3.3 square miles (9 km^{2}), and left more than 100,000 residents homeless. The fire began in a neighborhood southwest of the city center. A long period of hot, dry, windy conditions, and the wooden construction prevalent in the city, led to the conflagration spreading quickly. The fire leapt the south branch of the Chicago River and destroyed much of central Chicago and then crossed the main stem of the river, consuming the Near North Side.

Help flowed to the city after the fire. The city government improved building codes to stop the rapid spread of future fires and rebuilt rapidly to those higher standards. A donation from the United Kingdom spurred the establishment of the Chicago Public Library.

== Origin ==
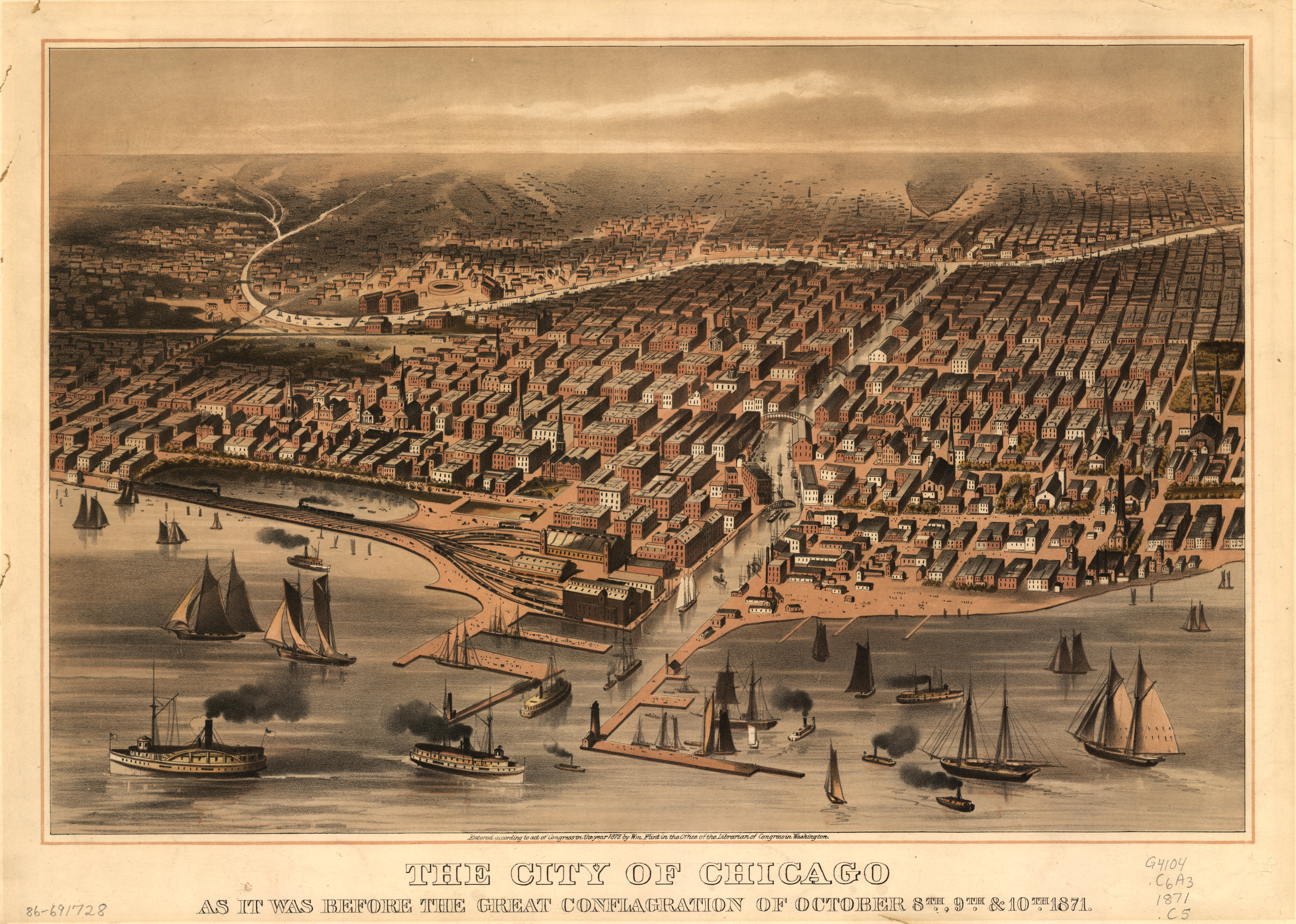
1871 Chicago view before the 'Great Conflagration'

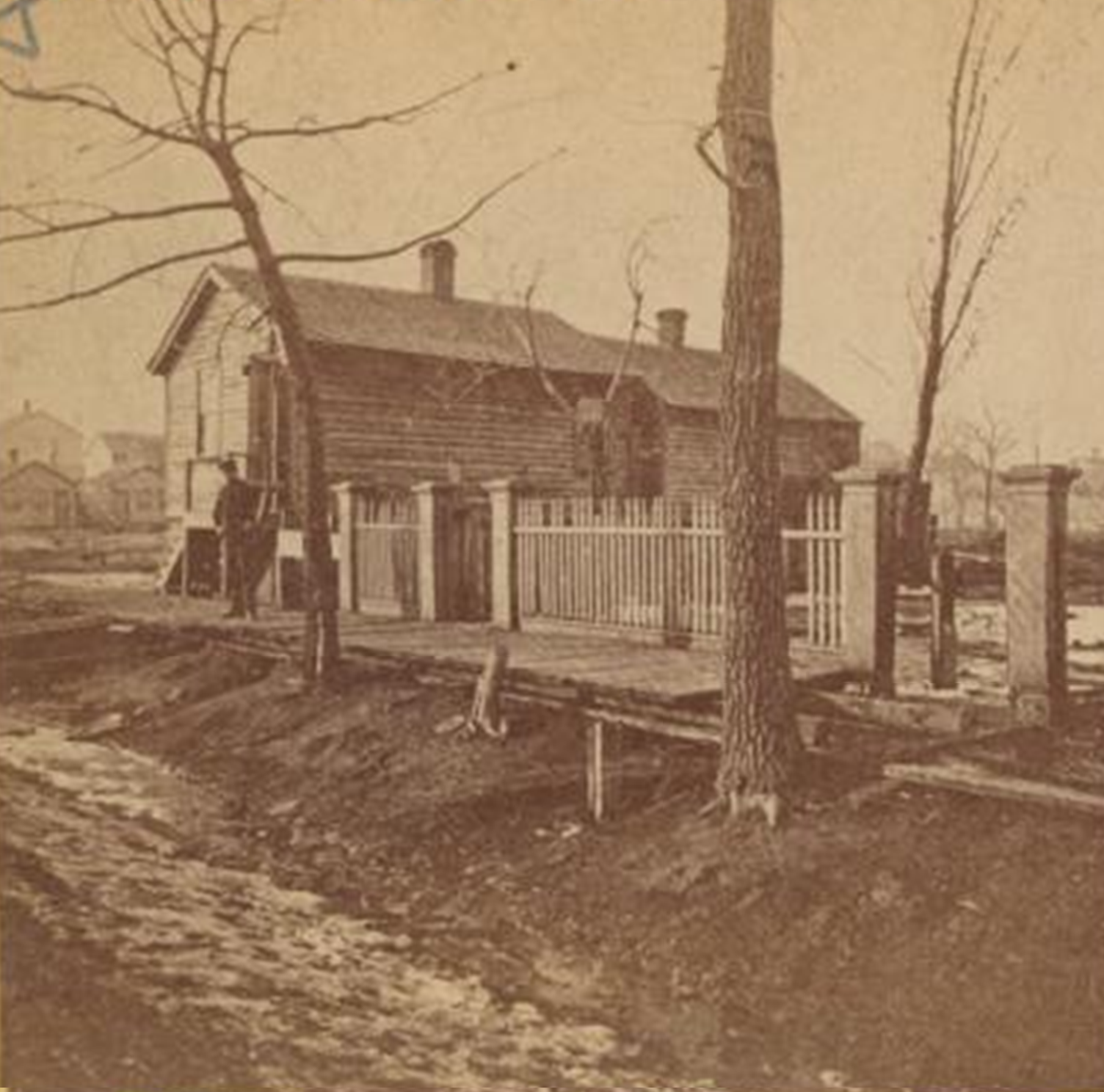
The O'Leary family cottage, 137 (now 558) W. DeKoven St. The neighborhood was congested with wooden buildings and industry, causing the fire to spread rapidly. A strong northeastern wind spared the cottage and the buildings to its west. From a stereoptican view by A.H. Abbott, whose studio at 976 (now 2201) N. Clark Street was consumed by the flames.

According to Nancy Connolly, great-great-granddaughter of Catherine O'Leary, the fire is said to have started at about 8:30 p.m. on October 8, in or around a small barn belonging to the O'Leary family that bordered the alley behind 137 W. DeKoven Street when Daniel "Peg-Leg" Sullivan accidentally knocked over a lantern while looking for beer for a party. The shed next to the barn was the first building to be consumed by the fire. City officials never determined the cause of the blaze, but the rapid spread of the fire due to a long drought in that year's summer, strong winds from the southwest, and the rapid destruction of the water pumping system explain the extensive damage of the mainly wooden city structures. There has been much speculation over the years on the single start to the fire. The most historically popular tale blames Mrs. O'Leary's cow, which allegedly knocked over a lantern; others state that a group of men were gambling inside the barn and knocked over a lantern. Still other speculation suggests that the blaze was related to other fires in the Midwest that day. In 1997, the Chicago City Council formally exonerated O'Leary of any responsibility for the fire, following research by historian Richard Bales.

The fire's spread was aided by the city's use of wood as the predominant building material in a style called balloon frame. More than two-thirds of the structures in Chicago at the time of the fire were made entirely of wood, with most of the houses and buildings being topped with highly combustible tar or shingle roofs. All of the city's sidewalks and many roads were also made of wood. Compounding this problem, Chicago received only 1 inch (25 mm) of rain from July 4 to October 9, causing severe drought conditions before the fire, while strong southwest winds helped to carry flying embers toward the heart of the city.

In 1871, the Chicago Fire Department had 185 firefighters with just 17 horse-drawn steam pumpers to protect the entire city. The initial response by the fire department was timely, but due to an error by the watchman, Mathias Schaffer, the firefighters were initially sent to the wrong place, allowing the fire to grow unchecked. An alarm sent from the area near the fire also failed to register at the courthouse where the fire watchmen were, while the firefighters were tired from having fought numerous small fires and one large fire in the week before. These factors combined to turn a small barn fire into a conflagration.

== Spread ==
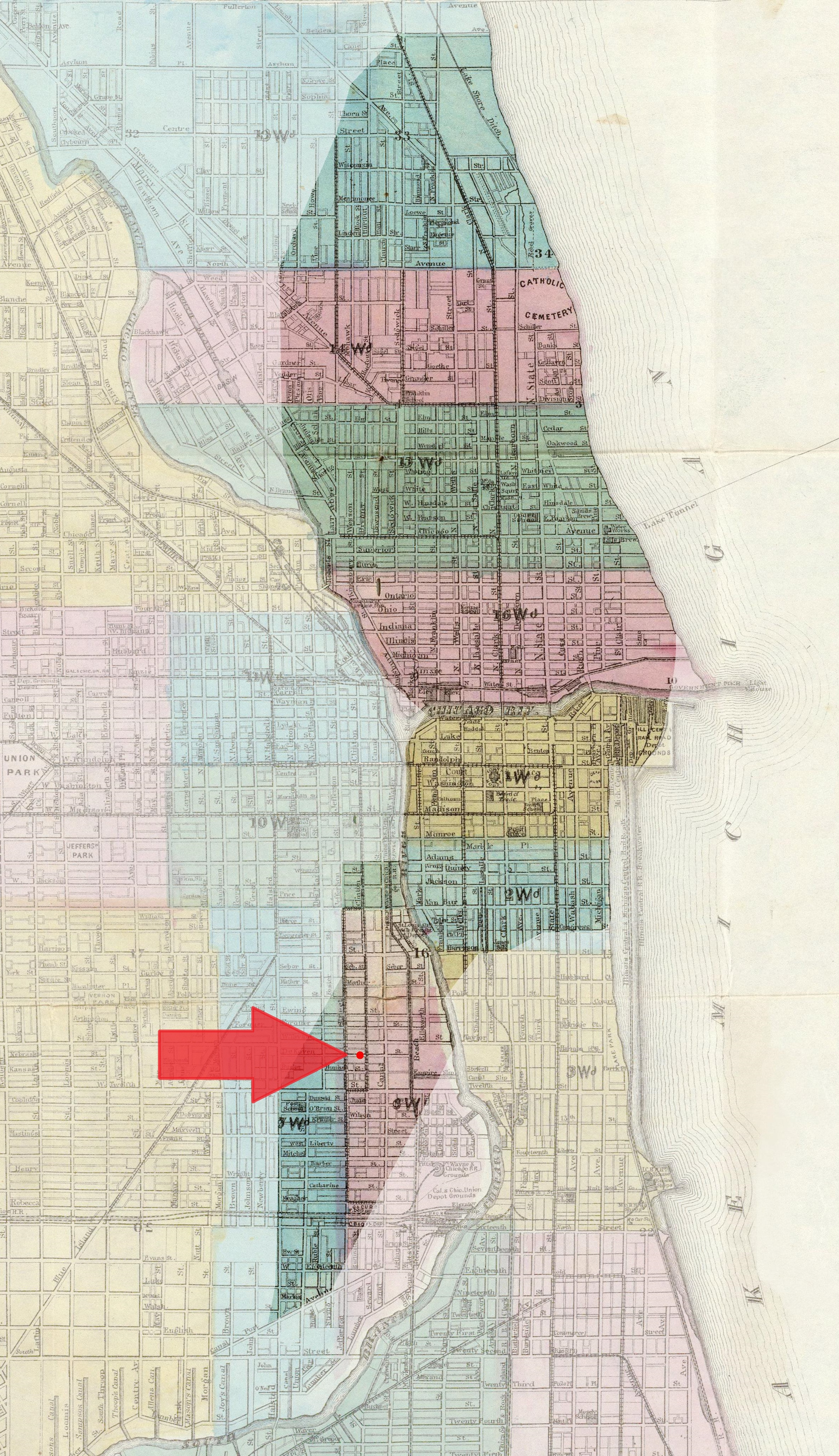
1869 map of Chicago, altered to show the area destroyed by the fire (location of O'Leary's barn indicated by red dot and arrow)

When firefighters finally arrived at DeKoven Street, the fire had grown and spread to neighboring buildings and was progressing toward the central business district. Firefighters had hoped that the South Branch of the Chicago River and an area that had previously thoroughly burned would act as a natural firebreak. All along the river, however, were lumber yards, warehouses, and coal yards, as well as barges, and numerous bridges across the river. As the fire grew, the southwest wind intensified and the temperature rose, causing structures to catch fire from the heat and from burning debris blown by the wind. Around midnight, flaming debris blew across the river and landed on roofs and the South Side Gas Works.

With the fire across the river and moving rapidly toward the heart of the city, panic set in. About this time, Mayor Roswell B. Mason sent messages to nearby towns asking for help. When the courthouse caught fire, he ordered the building to be evacuated and the prisoners jailed in the basement to be released. At 2:30 a.m. on the 9th, the cupola of the courthouse collapsed, sending the great bell crashing down. Some witnesses reported hearing the sound from a mile (1.6 km) away.

As more buildings succumbed to the flames, a major contributing factor to the fire's spread was a meteorological phenomenon known as a fire whirl. As hot air rises, it comes into contact with cooler air and begins to spin, creating a tornado-like effect. These fire whirls are likely what drove flaming debris so high and so far. Such debris was blown across the main branch of the Chicago River to a railroad car carrying kerosene. The fire had jumped the river a second time and was now raging across the city's north side.

Despite the fire spreading and growing rapidly, the city's firefighters continued to battle the blaze. A short time after the fire jumped the river, a burning piece of timber lodged on the roof of the city's waterworks. Within minutes, the interior of the building was engulfed in flames and the building was destroyed. With it, the city's water mains went dry and the city was helpless. Contemporary Chicago Tribune reporting confirmed that the waterworks roof caught fire at an early hour, forcing firefighters to retreat before the building was lost. The fire burned unchecked from building to building, block to block. One eyewitness account, reprinted from a Western paper, described a family trapped on the fourth floor of a building at the corner of Randolph and Market Streets, the father collapsing beside his wife as the flames closed in.

Late in the evening of October 9, it started to rain, but the fire had already started to burn itself out. The fire had spread to the sparsely populated areas of the north side, having thoroughly consumed the densely populated areas.

== Aftermath ==
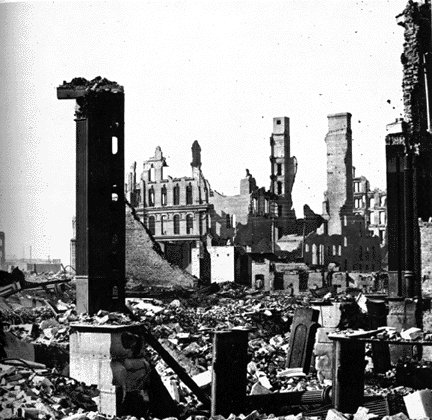
Aftermath of the fire, corner of Dearborn and Monroe Streets, 1871

Once the fire had ended, the smoldering remains were still too hot for a survey of the damage to be completed for many days. Eventually, the city determined that the fire destroyed an area about 4 miles (6 km) long and averaging 3/4 mile (1 km) wide, encompassing an area of more than 2,000 acres (809 ha). Destroyed were more than 73 miles (117 km) of roads, 120 miles (190 km) of sidewalk, 2,000 lampposts, 17,500 buildings, and $222 million in property, which was about a third of the city's valuation in 1871.

On October 11, 1871, U.S. Army Lieutenant General Philip H. Sheridan came to the aid of the city. Chicago mayor Roswell B. Mason issued a proclamation that declared martial law and placed the city under Sheridan's temporary control:

"The Preservation of the Good Order and Peace of the city is hereby intrusted to Lieut. General P.H. Sheridan, U.S. Army."

Sheridan's command structure consisted of a mix of regular troops, militia units, police, and a specially organized civilian group "First Regiment of Chicago Volunteers". Former Lieutenant-Governor William Bross, and part owner of the Tribune, later recollected his response to the arrival of Gen. Sheridan and his soldiers: "Never did deeper emotions of joy overcome me. Thank God, those most dear to me and the city as well are safe." For two weeks, Sheridan's men patrolled the streets, guarded the relief warehouses, and enforced other regulations. On October 24 the troops were relieved of their duties and the volunteers were mustered out of service.

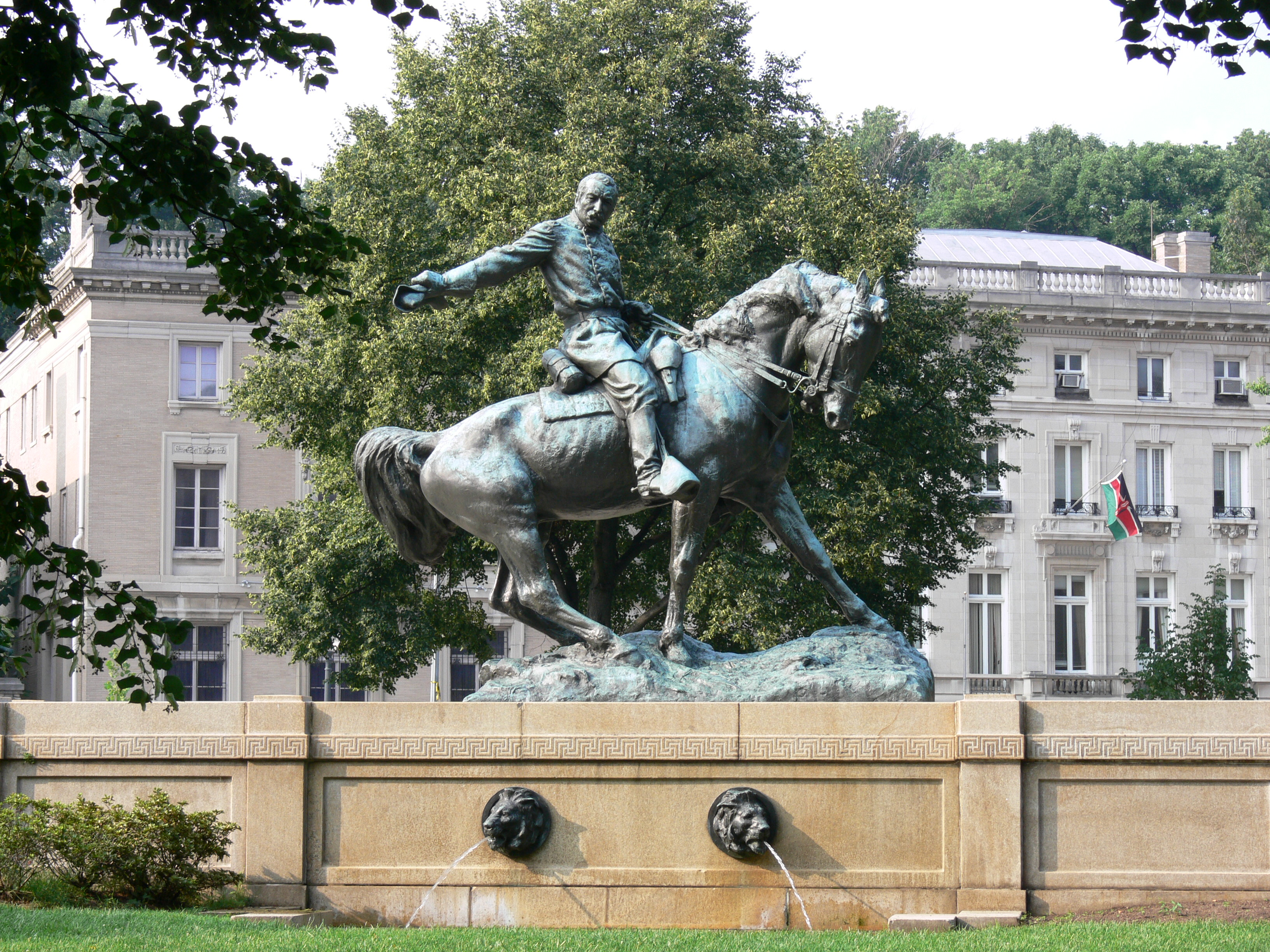
General Philip H. Sheridan, who saved Chicago three times: the Great Fire in October 1871, when he used explosives to stop the spread; again after the Great Fire, protecting the city; and lastly in 1877 during the Chicago railroad strike of 1877, riding in from 1,000 mi (1,600 km) away to restore order.

Of the approximately 324,000 inhabitants of Chicago in 1871, 90,000 Chicago residents (about 28% of the population) were left homeless. 120 bodies were recovered, but the death toll may have been as high as 300. The county coroner speculated that an accurate count was impossible, as some victims may have drowned or had been incinerated, leaving no remains.

In the days and weeks following the fire, monetary donations flowed into Chicago from around the country and abroad, along with donations of food, clothing, and other goods. These donations came from individuals, corporations, and cities. New York City gave $450,000 (equivalent to $12.1 million today) along with clothing and provisions, St. Louis gave $300,000 (equivalent to $8.06 million today), and the Common Council of London gave 1,000 guineas, as well as £7,000 from private donations. In Greenock, Scotland (pop. 40,000) a town meeting raised £518 on the spot. Cincinnati, Cleveland, and Buffalo, all commercial rivals, donated hundreds and thousands of dollars. Milwaukee, along with other nearby cities, helped by sending fire-fighting equipment. Food, clothing and books were brought by train from all over the continent. Mayor Mason placed the Chicago Relief and Aid Society in charge of the city's relief efforts.

Operating from the First Congregational Church, city officials and aldermen began taking steps to preserve order in Chicago. Contemporary accounts reported that draymen, hackmen, and vehicle drivers extorted desperate residents during the fire itself, refusing to carry people's belongings unless paid $50 to $100 in advance; helpless women with children fleeing their burning homes were among those turned away when they could not meet the demanded price. Price gouging was a key concern, and in one ordinance, the city set the price of bread at 8¢ for a 12-ounce (340 g) loaf. Public buildings were opened as places of refuge, and saloons closed at 9 in the evening for the week following the fire. Many people who were left homeless after the incident were never able to get their normal lives back since all their personal papers and belongings burned in the conflagration. Tribune reporting also documented deliberate arson during the chaos: one man set fire to the Jesuit Church on the West Side, while a woman was arrested for firing a building on Burnside Street; the man was caught by neighbors, stoned, and beaten to death on the spot.

After the fire, A. H. Burgess of London proposed an "English Book Donation", to spur a free library in Chicago, in their sympathy with Chicago over the damages suffered. Libraries in Chicago had been private with membership fees. In April 1872, the City Council passed the ordinance to establish the free Chicago Public Library, starting with the donation from the United Kingdom of more than 8,000 volumes.

The fire also led to questions about development in the United States. Due to Chicago's rapid expansion at that time, the fire led to Americans reflecting on industrialization. Based on a religious point of view, some said that Americans should return to a more old-fashioned way of life, and that the fire was caused by people ignoring traditional morality. On the other hand, others believed that a lesson to be learned from the fire was that cities needed to improve their building techniques. Frederick Law Olmsted observed that poor building practices in Chicago were a problem:

Chicago had a weakness for "big things", and liked to think that it was outbuilding New York. It did a great deal of commercial advertising in its house-tops. The faults of construction as well as of art in its great showy buildings must have been numerous. Their walls were thin, and were overweighted with gross and coarse misornamentation.

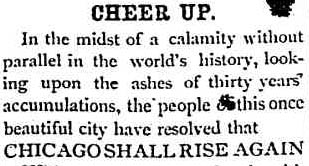
Chicago Tribune editorial

Olmsted also believed that with brick walls, and disciplined firemen and police, the deaths and damage caused would have been much less.

Almost immediately, the city began to rewrite its fire standards, spurred by the efforts of leading insurance executives, and fire-prevention reformers such as Arthur C. Ducat. Chicago soon developed one of the country's leading fire-fighting forces.

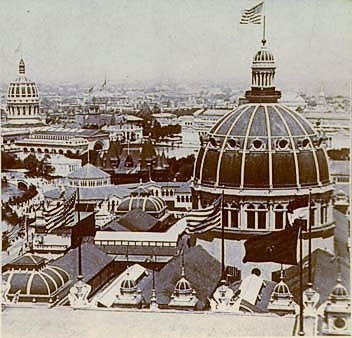
More than 20 years after the Great Fire, 'The World Columbian Exposition of 1893', known as the 'White City', for being lit up with newly invented light bulbs and electric power.

Business owners and land speculators such as Gurdon Saltonstall Hubbard quickly set about rebuilding the city. The first load of lumber for rebuilding was delivered the day the last burning building was extinguished. By the World's Columbian Exposition 22 years later, Chicago hosted more than 21 million visitors. The Palmer House hotel burned to the ground in the fire 13 days after its grand opening. Its developer, Potter Palmer, secured a loan and rebuilt the hotel to higher standards, across the street from the original, proclaiming it to be "The World's First Fireproof Building".

In 1956, the remaining structures on the original O'Leary property at 558 W. DeKoven Street were torn down for construction of the Chicago Fire Academy, a training facility for Chicago firefighters, known as the Quinn Fire Academy or Chicago Fire Department Training Facility. A bronze sculpture of stylized flames, entitled Pillar of Fire by Egon Weiner, was erected on the point of origin in 1961.

== Surviving structures ==
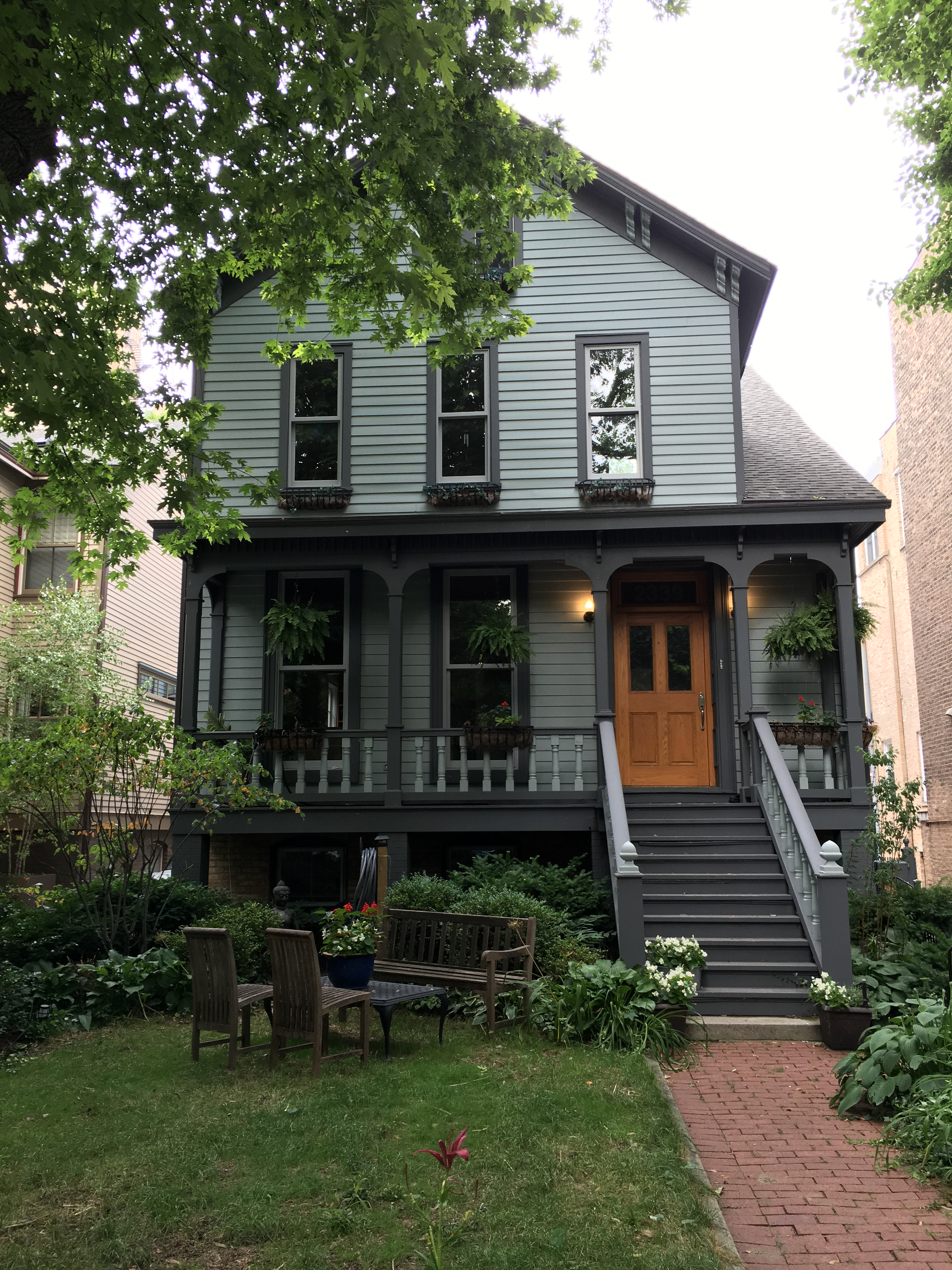
2339 Cleveland Avenue in Lincoln Park survived the path of the fire (photographed in 2016)

The following structures from the burned district are still standing:

- St. Michael's Church, Old Town
- Chicago Water Tower
- Chicago Avenue Pumping Station
- Police Constable Bellinger's cottage at 21 Lincoln Place (2121 North Hudson, today).
- 2339 and 2343 North Cleveland Avenue also survived the blaze.

St. Michael's Church and the Pumping Station were both gutted in the fire, but their exteriors survived, and the buildings were rebuilt using the surviving walls. Additionally, though the inhabitable portions of the building were destroyed, the bell tower of St. James Cathedral survived the fire and was incorporated into the rebuilt church. The stones near the top of the tower are still blackened from the soot and smoke.

== Panorama of damage ==
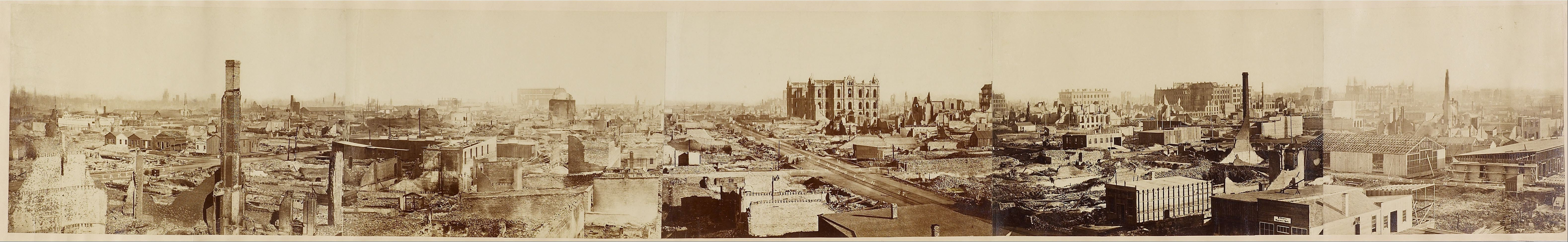
Attributed to George N. Barnard

== Precise start ==
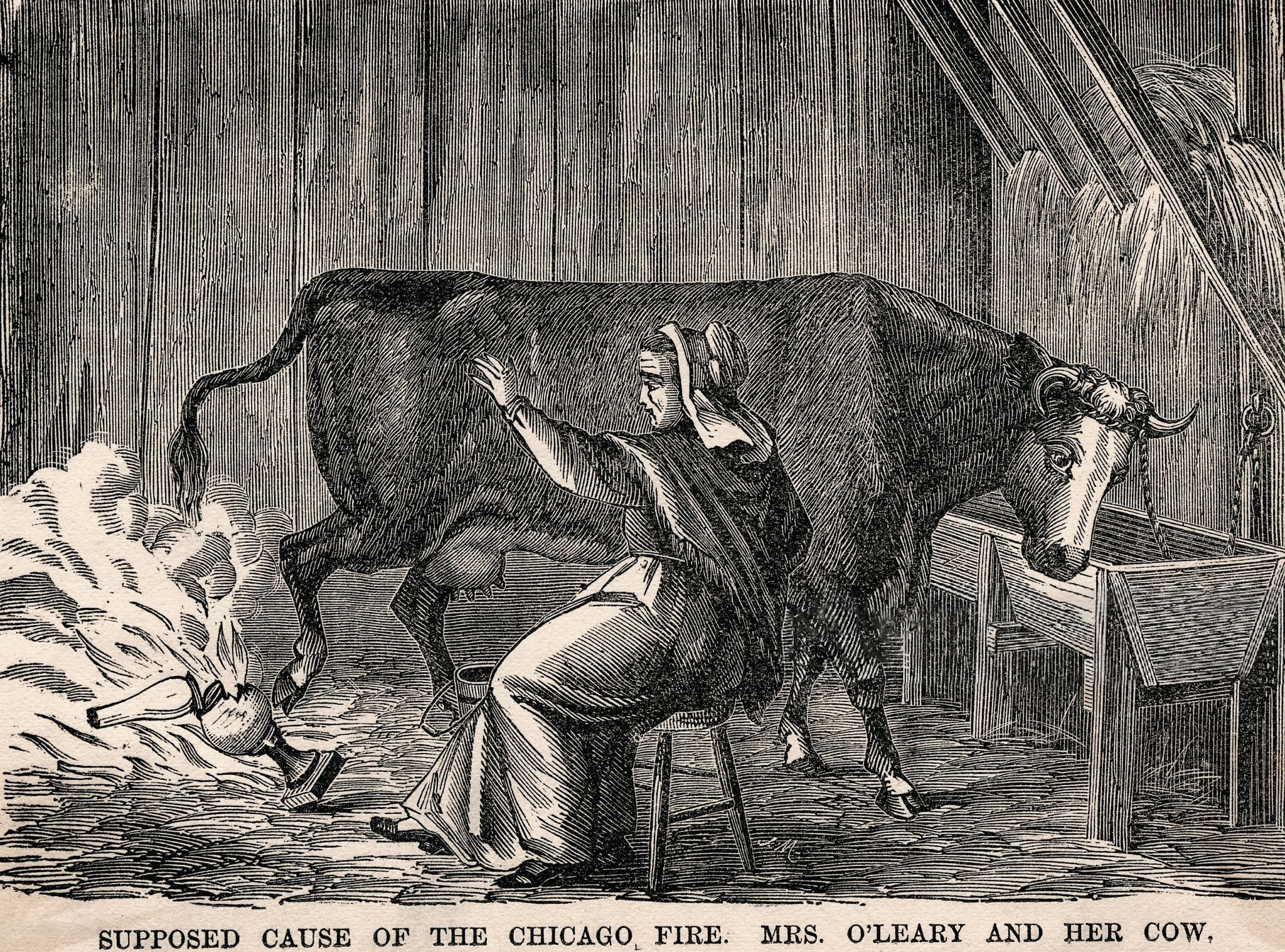
An 1871 illustration from Harper's Magazine depicting Mrs. O'Leary milking the cow

Almost from the moment the fire broke out, various theories about its cause began to circulate. The most popular and enduring legend maintains that the fire began in the O'Leary barn as Mrs. O'Leary was milking her cow. The cow kicked over a lantern (or an oil lamp in some versions), setting fire to the barn. The O'Leary family denied this, stating that they were in bed before the fire started, but stories of the cow began to spread across the city. Catherine O'Leary seemed the perfect scapegoat: she was a poor, Irish Catholic immigrant. During the latter half of the 19th century, anti-Irish sentiment was strong in Chicago and throughout the United States. This was intensified as a result of the growing political power of the city's Irish population.

Furthermore, the United States had been distrustful of Catholics (or papists, as they were often called) since its beginning, carrying over attitudes in England in the 17th century; as an Irish Catholic, Mrs. O'Leary was a target of both anti-Catholic and anti-Irish sentiment. This story was circulating in Chicago even before the flames had died out, and it was noted in the Chicago Tribune's first post-fire issue. In 1893 the reporter Michael Ahern retracted the "cow-and-lantern" story, admitting it was fabricated, but even his confession was unable to put the legend to rest. Although the O'Learys were never officially charged with starting the fire, the story became so engrained in local lore that Chicago's city council officially exonerated them—and the cow—in 1997.

Amateur historian Richard Bales has suggested the fire started when Daniel "Pegleg" Sullivan, who first reported the fire, ignited hay in the barn while trying to steal milk. Part of Bales's evidence includes an account by Sullivan, who claimed in an inquiry before the Fire Department of Chicago on November 25, 1871, that he saw the fire coming through the side of the barn and ran across DeKoven Street to free the animals from the barn, one of which included a cow owned by Sullivan's mother. Bales's account does not have consensus. The Chicago Public Library staff criticized his account in their web page on the fire. Despite this, the Chicago city council was convinced of Bales's argument and stated that the actions of Sullivan on that day should be scrutinized after the O'Leary family was exonerated in 1997.

Anthony DeBartolo reported evidence in two articles of the Chicago Tribune (October 8, 1997, and March 3, 1998, reprinted in Hyde Park Media) suggesting that Louis M. Cohn may have started the fire during a craps game. Following his death in 1942, Cohn bequeathed $35,000 which was assigned by his executors to the Medill School of Journalism at Northwestern University. The bequest was given to the school on September 28, 1944, and the dedication contained a claim by Cohn to have been present at the start of the fire. According to Cohn, on the night of the fire, he was gambling in the O'Learys' barn with one of their sons and some other neighborhood boys. When Mrs. O'Leary came out to the barn to chase the gamblers away at around 9:00, they knocked over a lantern in their flight, although Cohn states that he paused long enough to scoop up the money. The argument is not universally accepted.

An alternative theory, first suggested in 1882 by Ignatius L. Donnelly in Ragnarok: The Age of Fire and Gravel, is that the fire was caused by a meteor shower. This was described as a "fringe theory" concerning Biela's Comet. At a 2004 conference of the Aerospace Corporation and the American Institute of Aeronautics and Astronautics, engineer and physicist Robert Wood suggested that the fire began when a fragment of Biela's Comet impacted the Midwest. Biela's Comet had broken apart in 1845 and had not been observed since. Wood argued that four large fires took place, all on the same day, all on the shores of Lake Michigan (see related events), suggesting a common root cause. Eyewitnesses reported sighting spontaneous ignitions, lack of smoke, "balls of fire" falling from the sky, and blue flames. According to Wood, these accounts suggest that the fires were caused by the methane that is commonly found in comets.

Meteorites are not known to start or spread fires and are cool to the touch after reaching the ground, so this theory has not found favor in the scientific community. Methane-air mixtures become flammable only when the methane concentration exceeds 5%, at which point the mixtures also become explosive, a situation unlikely to occur from meteorites. Methane gas is lighter than air and thus does not accumulate near the ground; any localized pockets of methane in the open air rapidly dissipate. Moreover, if a fragment of an icy comet were to strike the Earth, the most likely outcome, due to the low tensile strength of such bodies, would be for it to disintegrate in the upper atmosphere, leading to a meteor air burst like the Tunguska event.

The specific choice of Biela's Comet does not match with the dates in question, as the 6-year period of the comet's orbit did not intersect that of the Earth until 1872, one full year after the fire, when a large meteor shower was observed. A common cause for the fires in the Midwest in late 1871 is that the area had had a dry summer, so that winds from the front that moved in that evening were capable of generating rapidly expanding blazes from available ignition sources, which were plentiful in the region.

== Related events ==
On that hot, dry, and windy autumn day, three other major fires occurred along the shores of Lake Michigan at the same time as the Great Chicago Fire. Some 250 miles (400 km) to the north, the Peshtigo Fire consumed the town of Peshtigo, Wisconsin, along with a dozen other villages. It killed 1,200 to 2,500 people and charred approximately 1.5 million acres (6,100 km^{2}). The Peshtigo Fire remains the deadliest in American history but the remoteness of the region meant it was little noticed at the time, because one of the first things that burned were the telegraph lines to Green Bay.

Across the lake to the east, the town of Holland, Michigan, and other nearby areas burned to the ground. Some 100 miles (160 km) to the north of Holland, the lumbering community of Manistee also went up in flames in what became known as the Great Michigan Fire.

Farther east, along the shore of Lake Huron, the Port Huron Fire swept through Port Huron, Michigan and much of Michigan's "Thumb". On October 9, 1871, a fire swept through the city of Urbana, Illinois, 140 miles (230 km) south of Chicago, destroying portions of its downtown area. Windsor, Ontario, likewise burned on October 12.

The town of Singapore, Michigan, provided a large portion of the lumber to rebuild Chicago. As a result, Singapore was so heavily deforested that the land deteriorated into barren sand dunes that buried the town, which had to be abandoned.

== In popular culture ==
- The University of Illinois at Chicago athletic teams have been nicknamed Flames since 1982, in commemoration of the Great Chicago Fire.
- Although set in Philadelphia, Theodore Dreiser's 1912 novel The Financier portrays the nationwide impact the 1871 Chicago fire had on the stock markets and the financial world.
- The 1938 film In Old Chicago is centered on the fire, with a highly fictionalized portrayal of the O'Leary family as the main characters.
- A Dudley Do-Right segment in The Adventures of Rocky and Bullwinkle and Friends featured a bear character named Stokey who was hypnotized by the segment's villain and lights fires instead of preventing fires. In the end of the segment, Do-Right took Stokey to Chicago to stay with a friend, but the bear ends up starting major fires, with the implication that he started the Great Chicago Fire. The segment was later banned for more than four decades due to protests from the U.S. Forest Service who disliked the parody of Smokey Bear shortly after its original airing in 1961.
- In 1974, the Chicago Fire football team played in the short-lived World Football League. Another Chicago Fire played in the American Football Association.
- The 1974 album Chicago VII by the band Chicago depicts scene of a cow knocking over a lantern with the Great Chicago Fire in the background on the bottom left corner of the album artwork.
- The 1976 made-for-TV movie Time Travelers has two doctors sent back to 1871 Chicago to find a cure for a disease thought lost to the fire. The Fire is shown starting when flames burst out from the O'Leary's barn and various attempts to stop the fire with a fire carriage and dynamiting buildings are depicted.
- A 1980 The Far Side strip by Gary Larson depicts two cows watching the 1871 fire from the outskirts of Chicago. One of them comments, "It seems that agent 6373 had accomplished her mission," alluding to O'Leary's cow.
- In the 1984 animated series Around the World with Willy Fog, adaptation of Around the World in Eighty Days, the characters talk about the Great Fire as they walk through the ruins of Chicago in December 1872. The original novel only mention that Chicago has "already risen from its ruins", and the characters just change trains at its station.
- Events of the 1986 novel Illinois! by Noel Gerson writing as Dana Fuller Ross occur around the Great Chicago Fire.
- The 1987 Williams pinball "Fire!" was inspired by the Great Chicago Fire.
- In the 1987 film Near Dark, set in the 1980s, the immortal vampires Severen and Jesse Hooker are implied to have started the Chicago Fire.
- The 1995 book The Great Fire by Jim Murphy tells the story of the fire for children, and was a Newbery Honor book in 1996.
- A 1998 episode of the American television series Early Edition depicted Gary Hobson finding himself back in time in 1871 trying to prevent the fire. While he initially succeeds and stops the fire after the lantern is kicked over, subsequent events lead to the fire restarting, preserving the historical event while changing its origin.
- The Major League Soccer team Chicago Fire was founded on October 8, 1997, the 126th anniversary of the Great Chicago Fire.
- In 2014, the city of Chicago and Redmoon Theater partnered to create The Great Chicago Fire Festival. Held on October 4, 2014, the event fell victim to technical difficulties as replicas of 1871 houses on floating barges in the Chicago River failed to ignite properly due to electrical problems and heavy rain on the preceding days.
- The Beach Boys' instrumental track titled "Mrs. O'Leary's Cow" was inspired by the fabled cause of the Great Chicago Fire, and served as the representation for the classical element fire on their abandoned project Smile.
- Adopted on April 4, 1917, the flag of Chicago represents the Great Chicago fire with one of the four red stars present on the flag.
- In the 1976 time travel science fiction story "Run, Come See Jerusalem!" By Richard C Meredith, the Great Fire of Chicago plays a pivotal role in the plot.

== See also ==
- Dwight L. Moody – 19th-century evangelist whose church was burned down in the fire
- Triangle Shirtwaist Factory fire – A similar event in 1911
- Our Lady of the Angels School fire — another disastrous structural fire in Chicago, 87 years later
- Iroquois Theater Fire — fire in the Chicago Loop in 1903 that killed 602 people and injured 250, the deadliest theater fire in U.S. history
