= DeKoven Street =

Street in Chicago

Coordinates: 41.869002°N 87.641501°W

- 1050 South
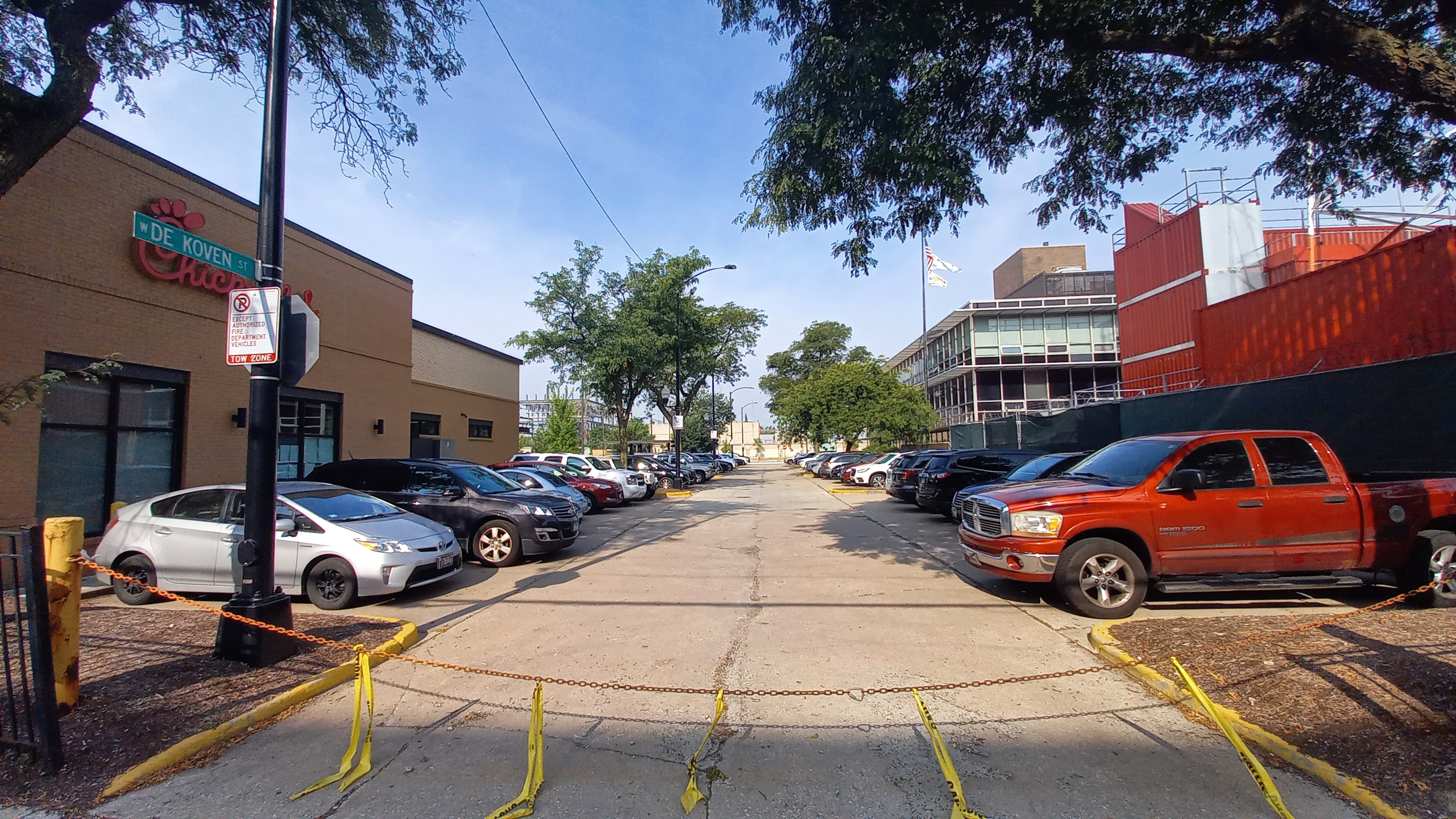
- DeKoven Street, as viewed from Clinton Street
- Interactive map of DeKoven Street
- Length: 409 ft (125 m)
- West end: Jefferson (current); Halsted (historical)
- East end: Clinton (current); Stewart (historical)

Other
- Known for: John DeKoven

DeKoven Street is a street in Chicago. Located in the city's Near West Side, it was named for John DeKoven, one of the founders of the Northern Trust Company.

== History ==
The earliest plat of Chicago, surveyed in 1830 in preparation for the Illinois and Michigan Canal, was located to the northeast of DeKoven Street and established Chicago's grid system. Chicago was incorporated as a town in 1833, and surveyors began extending its grid in 1834. DeKoven Street first appeared as a street at this time.

=== Great Chicago Fire ===
The Great Chicago Fire of 1871 started in the barn behind the cottage of Patrick and Catherine O'Leary at 137 (after 1909, 558) DeKoven Street. Although the popular story is that a cow kicked over a lantern to start the fire, Michael Ahern, the Chicago Republican reporter who created the cow story, admitted in 1893 that he had made it up because he thought it would make colorful copy. At the time, the street was in a less prosperous neighborhood of Chicago.

=== Subsequent history ===
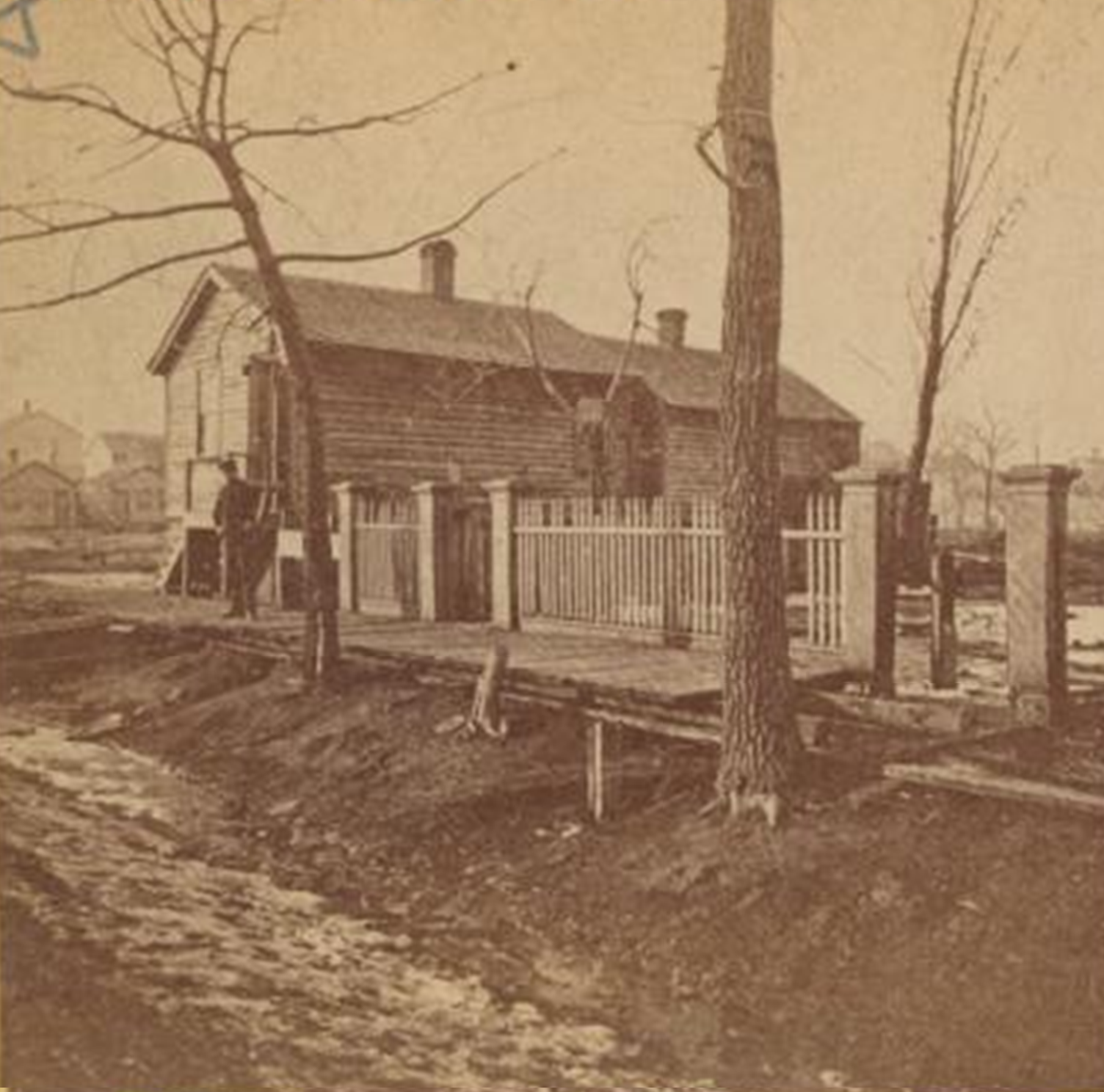
The cottage of Catherine and Patrick O'Leary, 137 (now 558) W. DeKoven St. As this view suggests, the neighborhood was congested with mean wooden buildings and a variety of industry, a condition which helped to spread the fire of 1871 as rapidly as it did. A strong wind blowing towards the northeast spared the O'Leary cottage and the buildings seen here to its west. From a stereoptican view by A.H. Abbott, Photographer, whose studio at 976 (now 2201) N. Clark Street was consumed by the flames.

The site is now occupied by the Chicago Fire Department training academy, near the intersection of Roosevelt Road and Canal Street, just southwest of the Loop. The address of the academy "...by design is the same as that where legend has it that Mrs. Mollie (sic) O'Leary's cow kicked over the lantern that started the Great Chicago Fire."

The site is a designated landmark of the City of Chicago.
