= Catherine O'Leary =

Irish immigrant living in Chicago (1827–1895)

- Born: Catherine Donegan; March 1827; Ireland
- Died: July 3, 1895 (aged 68); Chicago, Illinois, U.S.
- Burial place: Mount Olivet Cemetery
- Spouse: Patrick O'Leary
- Children: 3

Catherine O'Leary (née Donegan; March 1827 – July 3, 1895) was an Irish-born American immigrant living in Chicago who became associated with the origin of the Great Chicago Fire in 1871. She was widely accused of starting the fire when a cow in her barn allegedly kicked over a lantern, though the story was later shown to be unfounded.

== Early life and family ==
Catherine Donegan was born in Ireland and later emigrated to the United States. She married Patrick O'Leary, and the couple had three children. Their son, James Patrick O'Leary, later operated a saloon and gambling establishment.

== Great Chicago Fire and the legend ==
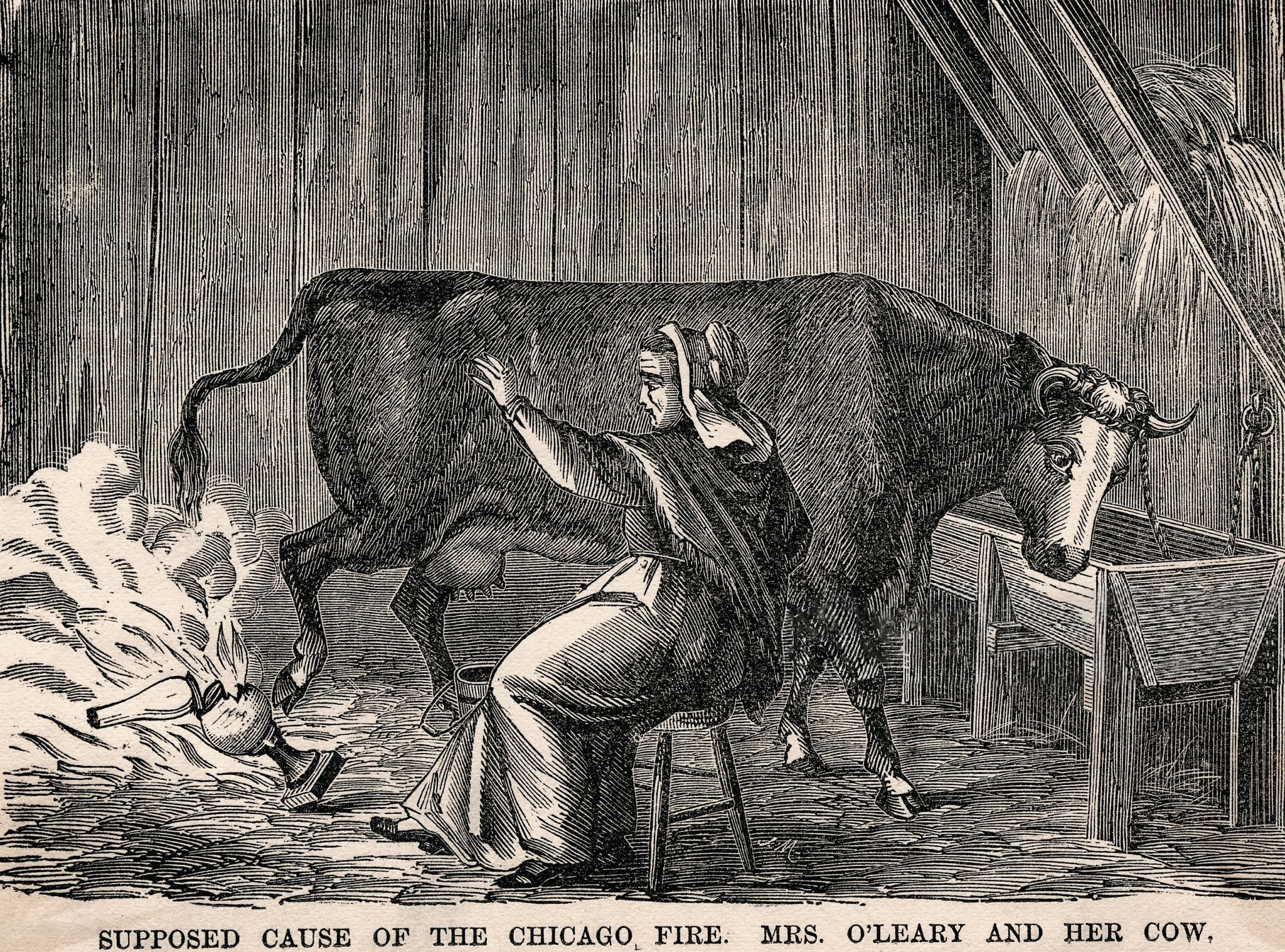
1871 Harper's Magazine illustration of Mrs O'Leary and her cow, showing the alleged cause of the fire.

On the evening of October 8, 1871, a fire began in the O'Leary family's barn on DeKoven Street. Fueled by dry conditions and strong winds, the fire spread rapidly and destroyed a large portion of Chicago.

Shortly after the fire, journalist Michael Ahern published a story claiming that the fire had started when a cow kicked over a lantern while it was being milked. Although he did not initially name Catherine O'Leary, she soon became associated with the incident because the fire began on her property. The story gained widespread attention and was reinforced by illustrations and caricatures.

=== Later accounts and reassessment ===
In 1893, Ahern admitted that he had fabricated the story. The official investigation into the fire concluded that its exact cause could not be determined. Anti-Irish sentiment at the time contributed to the O'Leary family being treated as scapegoats, and various unverified claims circulated about the circumstances of the fire.

== Later life, death and legacy ==
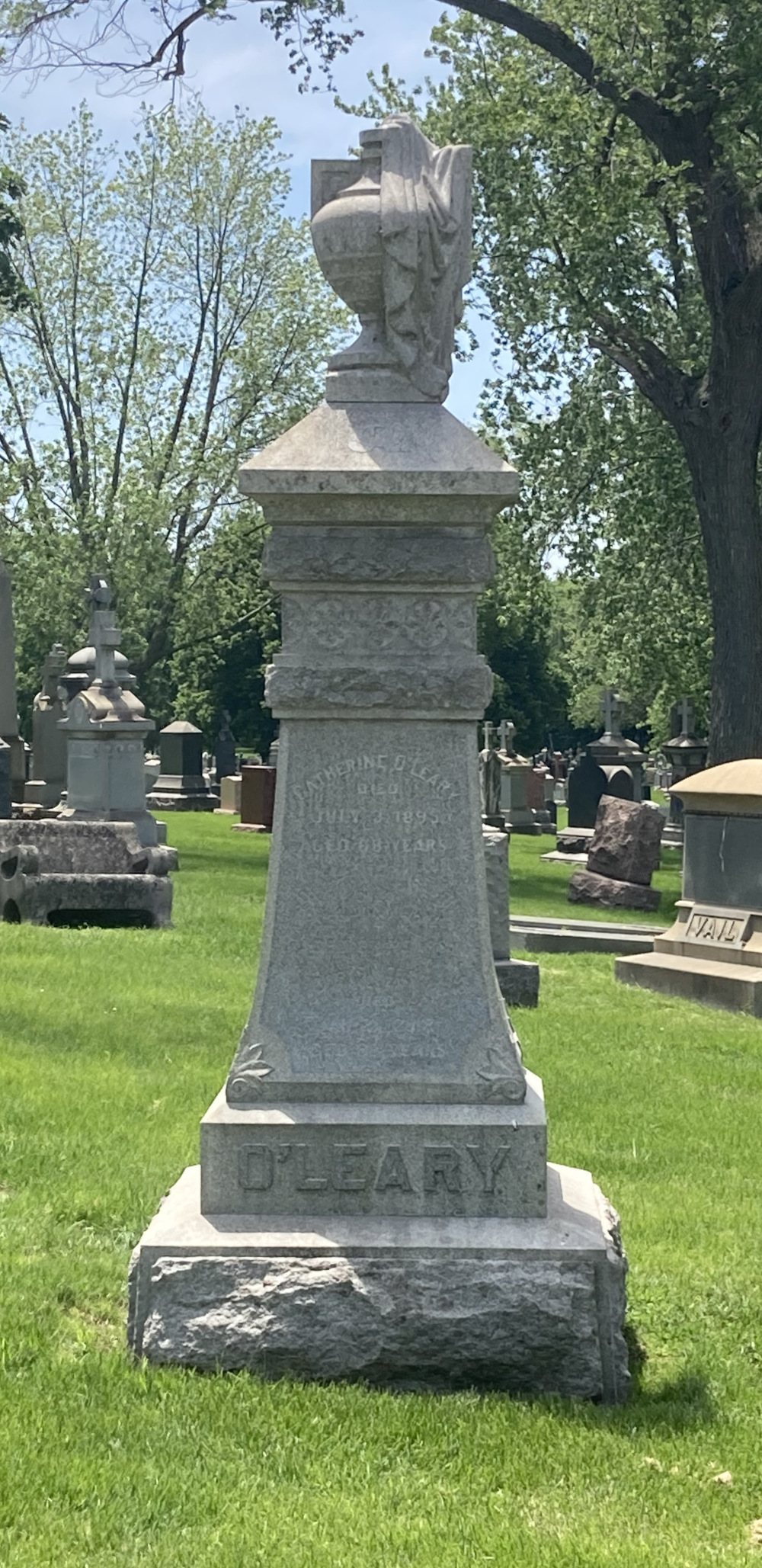
O'Leary's grave at Mount Olivet Cemetery

O'Leary continued to live in Chicago after the fire. She died on July 3, 1895, aged 68, from pneumonia, and was buried at Mount Olivet Cemetery.

The story of O'Leary's cow became a widely repeated explanation for the Great Chicago Fire, despite its lack of evidence. In 1997, the Chicago City Council formally exonerated O'Leary of any responsibility for the fire, following research by historian Richard Bales.

== Cultural references ==
O'Leary's story was dramatized in the film In Old Chicago (1938), in which she was portrayed by Alice Brady, who won the Academy Award for Best Supporting Actress.
