= List of Chicago alderpersons since 1923 =

Post-1923 Chicago City Council members

The Chicago City Council assumed its modern form on April 16, 1923, with fifty wards each electing one alderperson.

Since its incorporation as a city in 1837 Chicago had been divided into wards whose number varied (Note: They were six in 1837 and 35 immediately prior to 1923.) but which were almost (Note: The 3rd and 5th wards were entitled to one alderman each until 1839.) always entitled to two alderpersons. In the early 20th century it was decided that reducing the number of alderpersons to a ward to one would be a cost-saving measure, and an ordinance to that effect was passed in 1920, taking effect in 1923.

City council elections in Chicago have been formally nonpartisan since 1920. Nevertheless, many alderpersons have had, and continue to have, de facto partisan affiliations that are reflected in this list.

This list is organized by which side of the Chicago River the wards were on as of 1923. Numbering the wards such that those on the South Side received the first numbers, followed by in order the West and North sides was a tradition that had dated to the City's founding and division into wards in 1837. Incumbent alderpersons who started a new term in 1923 are reckoned as having started their term in 1923 regardless of whenever they actually started holding office, which is noted in the "Notes" column.

== History ==
Chicago was incorporated in 1837 and initially comprised six wards.

== South Side (Wards 1–19) ==
=== 1st Ward ===
Originally covering the Loop, Near South Side, and the northern part of Armour Square, this ward was significantly moved to its current location in 1993 to help stymie corruption.

No.	Alderperson	Term in office	Party	Notes
1	John Coughlin	April 16, 1923 – November 11, 1938	Democratic (Note: Fremon p. 25)	Had been serving since 1892; Died in office
2	Michael Kenna	April 12, 1939 – April 9, 1943	Democratic	Had previously served from 1897 to 1923
3	John Budinger	April 9, 1943 – 1951	Democratic	Had previously served (previous iteration of) the 4th ward from 1910 to 1912
4	John D'Arco Sr.	1951 – 1963	Democratic	
5	Michael Fiorito	February 16 – May 6, 1963	Democratic	Resigned
6	Donald Parrillo	1963 – 1968	Democratic	
7	Fred Roti	1968 – 1991	Democratic	
8	Ted Mazola	1991 – 1995	Democratic	
9	Jesse Granato	1995 – May 19, 2003	Democratic	
10	Manuel Flores	May 19, 2003 – January 4, 2010	Democratic	Appointed to be Chairman of the Illinois Commerce Commission
11	Proco Joe Moreno	March 26, 2010 – May 20, 2019	Democratic	
12	Daniel La Spata	May 20, 2019 – present	Democratic	

=== 2nd Ward ===
Originally covering Douglas and its immediate surroundings, this ward has drastically moved northward to its current location across the Near North Side and West Town.

No.	Alderperson	Term in office	Party	Notes
1	Louis B. Anderson	April 16, 1923 – 1933	Republican	Had been serving since 1917
2	William L. Dawson	1933 – April 12, 1939	Republican	
3	Earl B. Dickerson	April 12, 1939 – April 9, 1943	Democratic	
4	William H. Harvey	April 9, 1943 – December 20, 1968		Became a County Commissioner
5	Fred D. Hubbard	March 11, 1969 – March 16, 1972		
6	William Barnett	August 15, 1972 – 1983	Democratic	
7	Bobby Rush	1983 – 1993	Democratic	
8	Madeline Haithcock	1993 – May 21, 2007	Democratic	
9	Robert Fioretti	May 21, 2007 – May 2015	Democratic	
10	Brian K. Hopkins	May 2015 – present	Democratic	

=== 3rd Ward ===
No.	Alderperson	Term in office	Party	Notes
1	Robert R. Jackson	April 16, 1923 – April 12, 1939	Republican	Had been serving then-2nd ward since 1918
2	Benjaim A. Grant	April 12, 1939 – April 9, 1943		
3	Oscar Stanton De Priest	April 9, 1943 – 1947	Republican	Had previously served then-2nd ward from 1915 to 1917
4	Archibald Carey Jr.	1947 – 1955	Republican	
5	Ralph Metcalfe	1955 – December 1970	Democratic	Became a Congressman
6	Tyrone T. Kenner	February 23, 1971 – February 11, 1985		
7	Dorothy Tillman	February 11, 1985 – April 27, 2007	Democratic	
8	Pat Dowell	April 27, 2007 – Present	Democratic	

=== 4th Ward ===
No.	Alderperson	Term in office	Party	Notes
1	Ulysses S. Schwartz	April 16, 1923 – 1925		Had been serving then-3rd ward since 1916
2	Berthold A. Cronson	1925 – December 23, 1937	Republican	Died in office
3	Abraham H. Cohen	April 12, 1939 – 1955		
4	Claude Holman	1955 – June 1, 1973		Died in office
5	Timothy C. Evans	November 27, 1973 – 1991		
6	Toni Preckwinkle	1991 – 2010	Democratic	
7	Shirley Newsome	2010 – May 2011		
8	William D. Burns	May 2011 – February 2016	Democratic	
9	Sophia King	April 16, 2016 – present	Democratic	

=== 5th Ward ===
- Charles S. Eaton (Republican)
- Leonard J. Grossman
- Charles S. Eaton (Republican)
- Irving J. Schreiber
- James J. Cusack Jr. (Democratic)
- Paul Howard Douglas
- Bertram B. Moss
- Robert E. Merriam
- Leon Despres
- Ross Lathrop
- Lawrence Bloom
- Barbara Holt
- Leslie Hairston
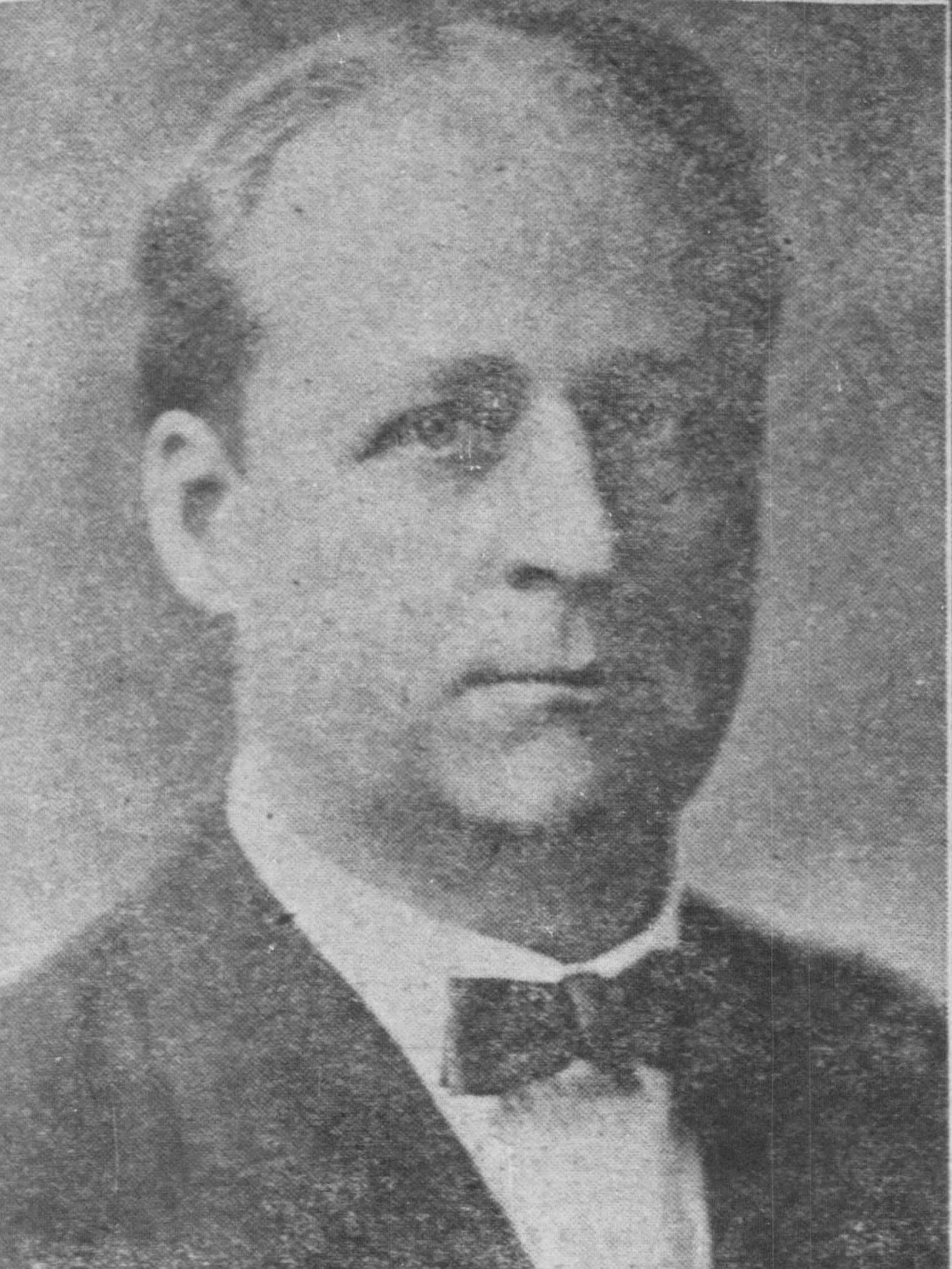
Charles S. Eaton

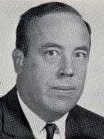
Robert E. Merriam

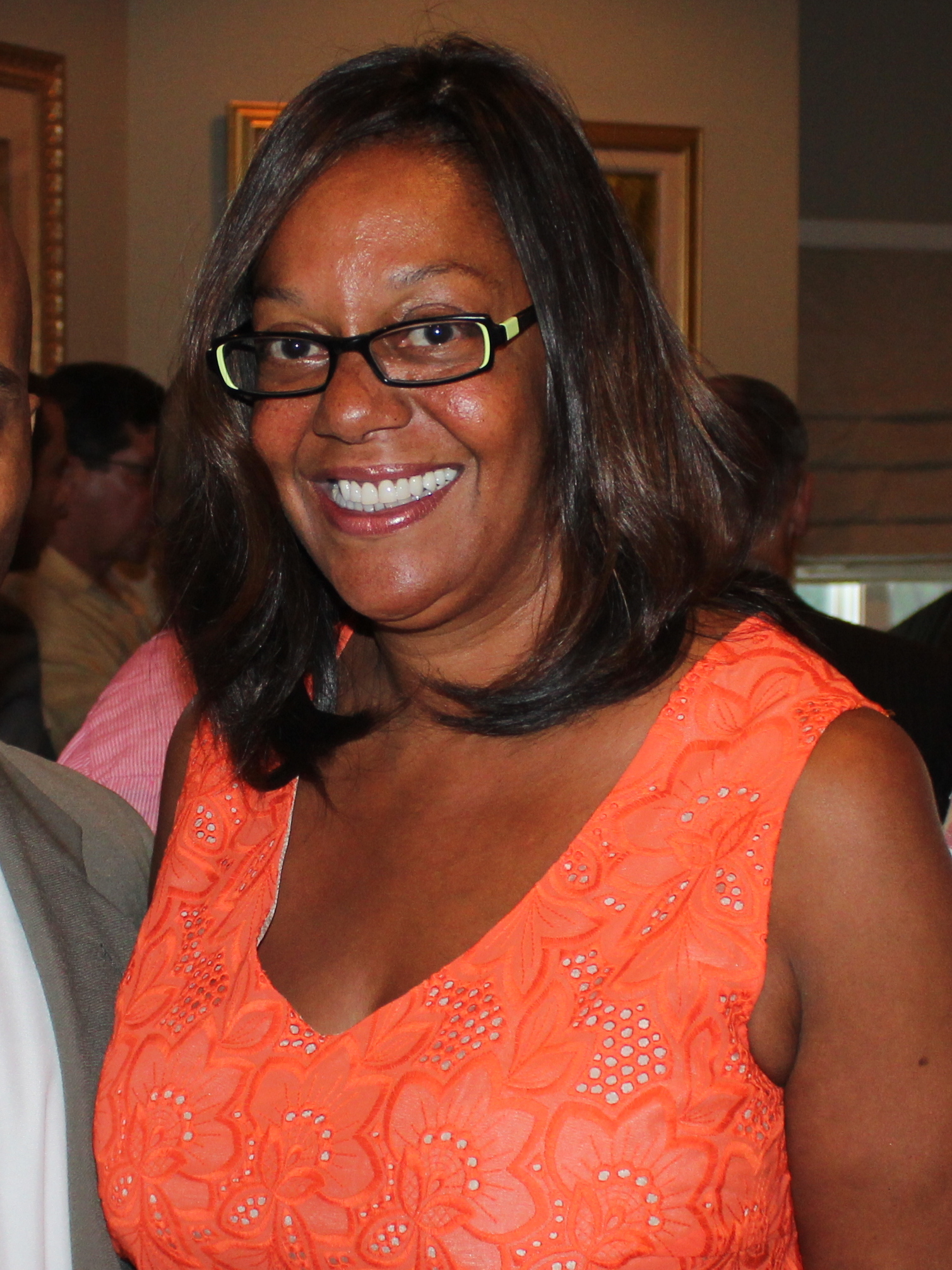
Leslie Hairston

=== 6th Ward ===
- Guy Guernsey
- John F. Healy (Democratic)
- Patrick Sheridan Smith
- Francis J. Hogan
- David R. Muir
- Sydney A. Jones Jr.
- Robert H. Miller
- A. A. Rayner Jr.
- Eugene Sawyer
- John O. Steele
- Freddrenna Lyle
- Roderick Sawyer

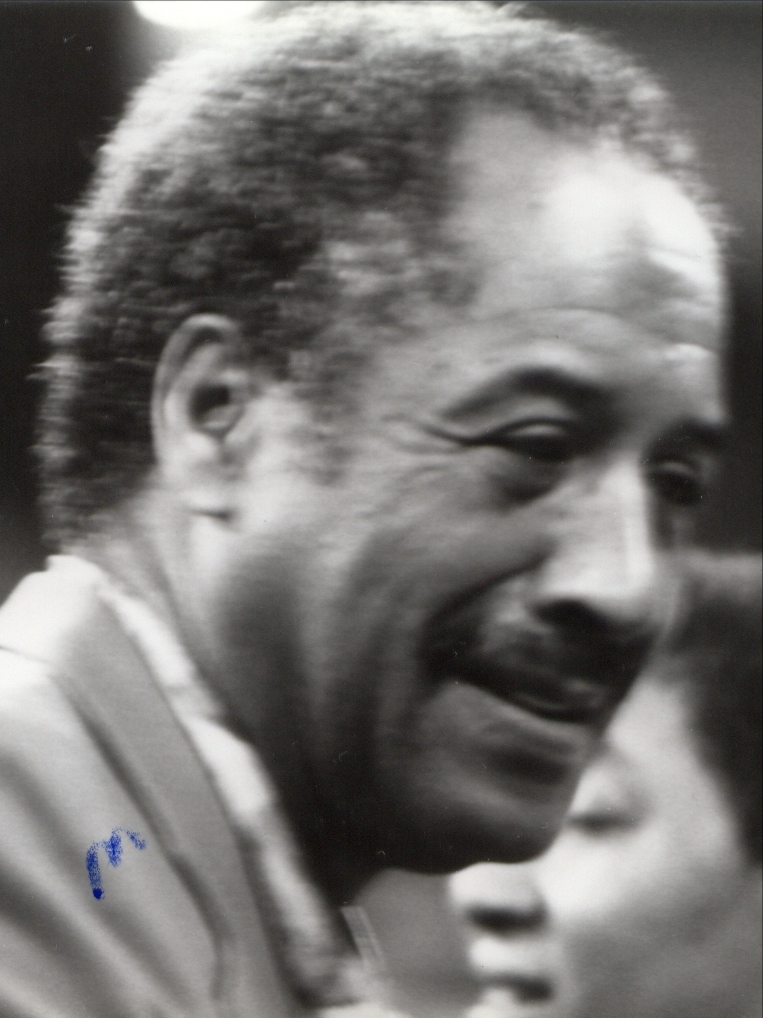
Eugene Sawyer

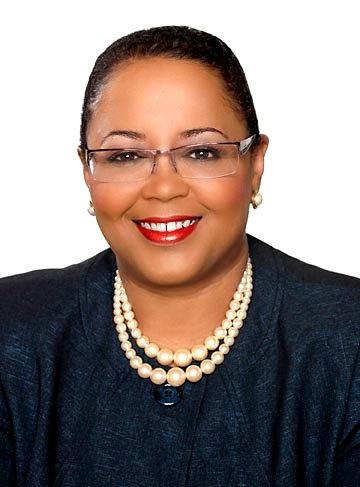
Freddrenna Lyle

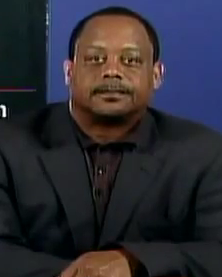
Roderick Sawyer
- William E. Hall

=== 7th Ward ===
- Ross A. Woodhull
- Clement A. Nance
- Barnet Hodes
- Thomas J. Daley (Democratic)
- Nicholas J. Bohling (Republican)
- Robert S. Wilinski
- Gerald E. Jones
- Robert S. Wilinski
- Joseph G. Bertrand
- William Beavers
- Darcel Beavers
- Sandi Jackson
- Natashia Holmes
- Gregory Mitchell
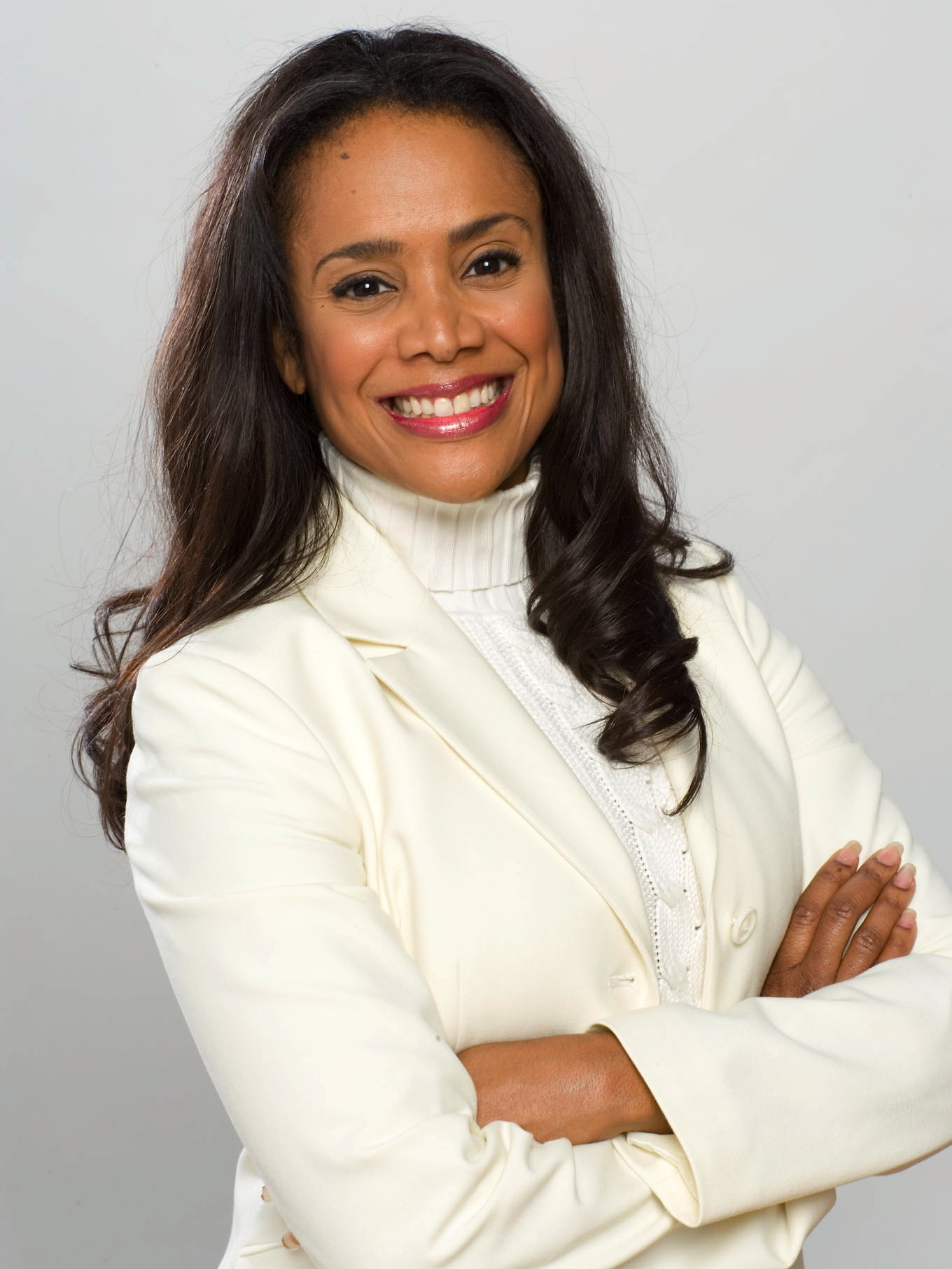
Sandi Jackson

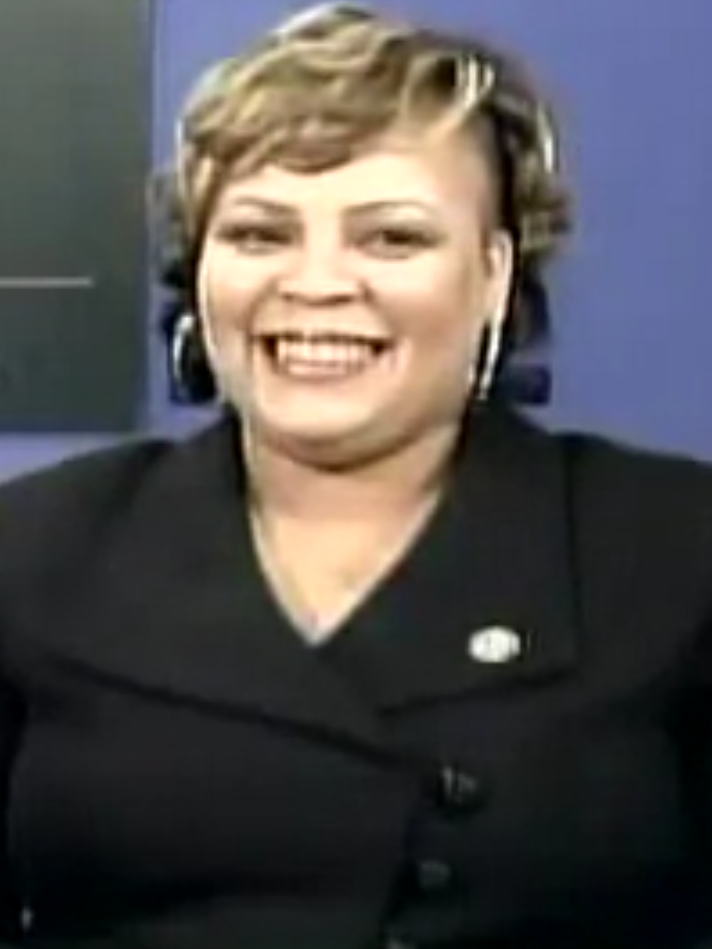
Natashia Holmes

=== 8th Ward ===
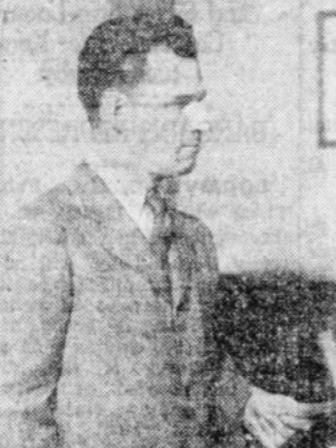
William D. Meyering

- William D. Meyering (Democratic)
- David L. Sutton (Democratic)
- Michael F. Mulcahy
- Roy E. Olin
- Einar Johnson
- James A. Condon
- William Cousins Jr.
- Marian Humes
- Keith Caldwell
- Lorraine L. Dixon
- Todd Stroger
- Michelle A. Harris

=== 9th Ward ===
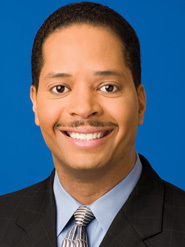
Anthony Beale

- Sheldon M. Govier
- Arthur G. Lindell (Republican)
- Reginald DuBois
- Dominic J. Lupo
- Alexander A. Adduci
- Robert Shaw
- Perry H. Hutchinson
- Robert Shaw
- Melvin Powell Sr.
- Anthony Beale

=== 10th Ward ===
- Ernest M. Cross (Republican)
- William A. Rowan (Democratic)
- William J. Pieczynski
- Emil V. Pacini
- John J. Buchanan
- Edward Vrdolyak
- Victor Vrdolyak
- John J. Buchanan
- John Pope
- Susan Sadlowski Garza
- Peter Chico (2023-present)
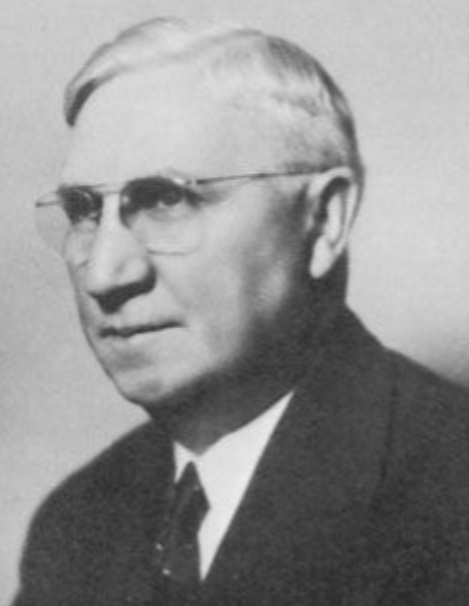
William A. Rowan

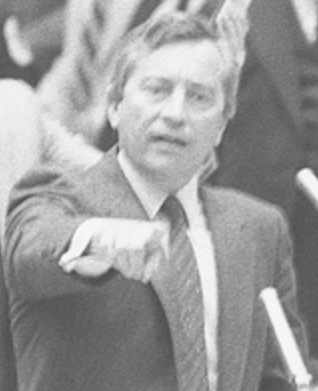
Edward Vrdolyak

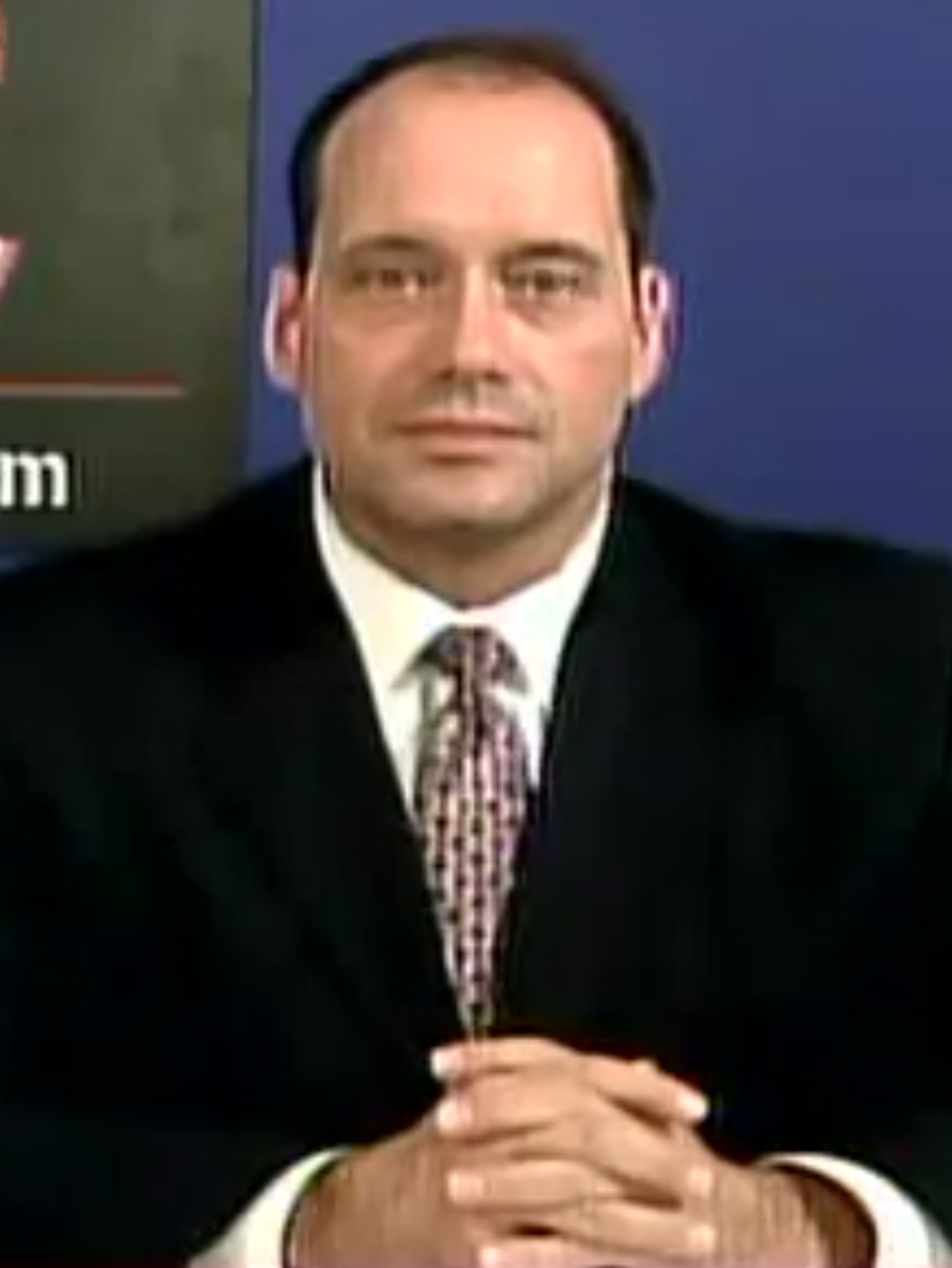
John Pope

=== 11th Ward ===
- Timothy A. Hogan
- John P. Wilson
- Thomas A. Doyle (Democratic)
- Hugh B. Connelly
- John F. Wall
- Stanley J. Nowakowski
- Matthew J. Danaher
- Michael Anthony Bilandic
- Patrick M. Huels
- James Balcer
- Patrick Daley Thompson
- Nicole Lee
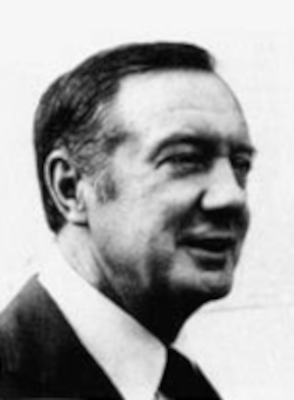
Michael A. Bilandic

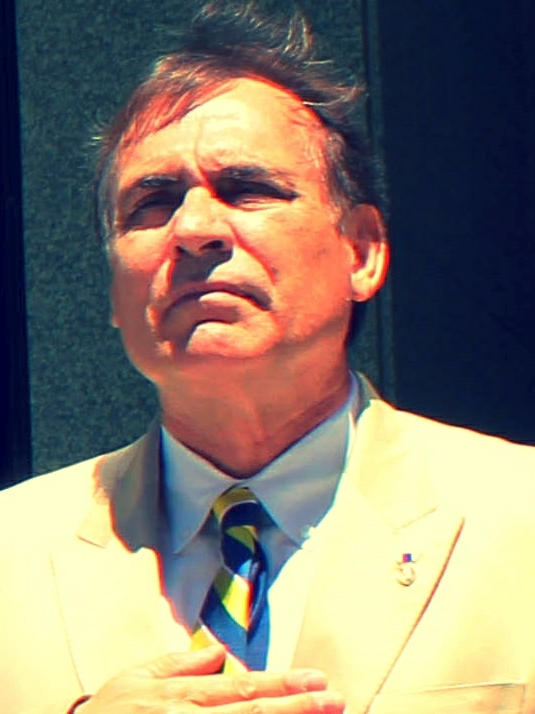
James Balcer

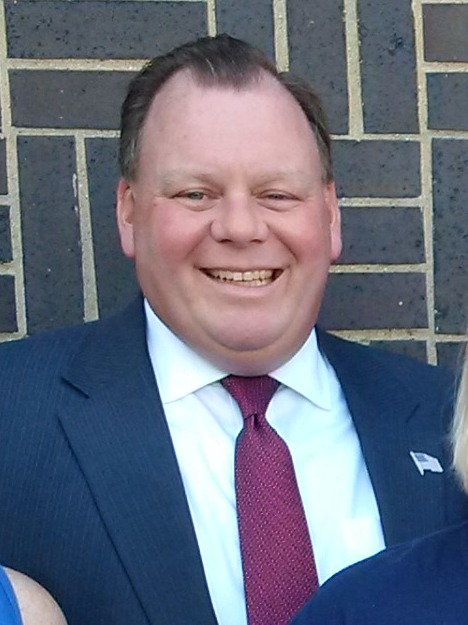
Patrick Daley Thompson

=== 12th Ward ===
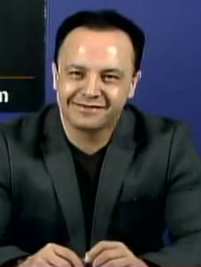
George Cardenas

- Ernest J. Kunstmann (Republican)
- Bryan Hartnett (Democratic)
- Benjamin J. Zintak
- Bryan Hartnett
- Edmund J. Kucharski
- Arthur V. Zelezinski
- Donald T. Swinarski
- George A. Kwak
- Aloysius Majerczyk
- Mark Fary
- Ray Frias
- George Cardenas
- Anabel Abarca
- Julia Ramirez

=== 13th Ward ===
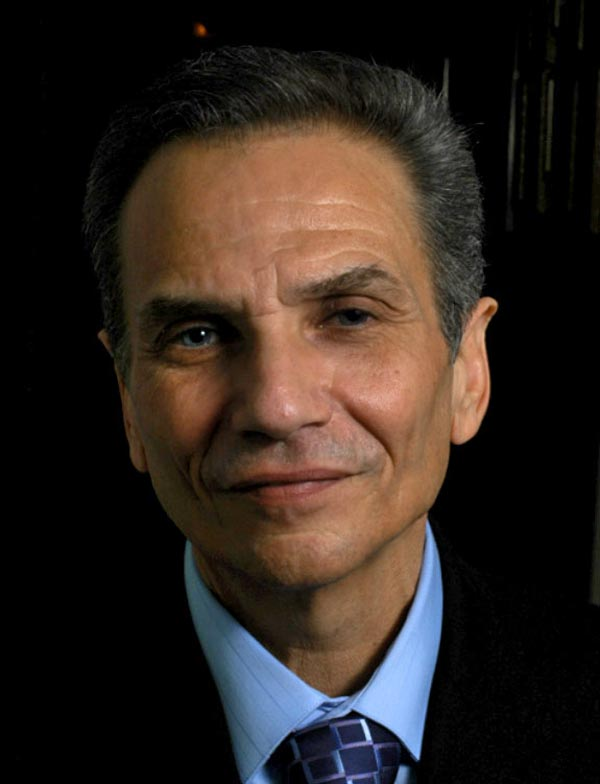
Frank Olivo

- Joseph B. McDonough
- Thomas A. Doyle
- John E. Egan (Democratic)
- Michael P. Hogan
- John E. Egan
- David W. Healy
- Casamir J. Staszcuk
- John S. Madrzyk
- Frank Olivo
- Marty Quinn

=== 14th Ward ===
No.	Alderperson	Term in office	Party	Notes
1	William R. O'Toole	April 16, 1923 – 1931	Democratic	Had been serving then-30th ward since 1914
2	Thomas J. O'Grady	1931 – 1933		
3	James J. McDermott	1933 – December 3, 1942	Democratic	Elected to Cook County Board of Appeals
4	Clarence P. Wagner	April 9, 1943 – July 10, 1953		Died in office
5	Joseph P. Burke	November 3, 1953 – May 11, 1968	Democratic	Died in office
6	Edward M. Burke	March 14, 1969 – May 15, 2023	Democratic	
7	Jeylú Gutiérrez	May 15, 2023 - Present	Democratic	

=== 15th Ward ===
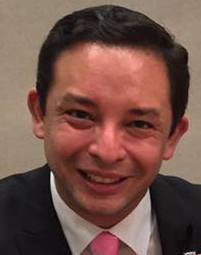
Raymond Lopez

- Thomas F. Byrne
- James F. Kovarik (Democratic)
- Edward F. Vyzral
- Frank Micek
- Joseph J. Krska
- Francis X. Lawlor
- Kenneth B. Jaksy
- Frank J. Brady
- Marlene C. Carter
- Virgil E. Jones
- Theodore Thomas
- Toni Foulkes
- Raymond Lopez

=== 16th Ward ===
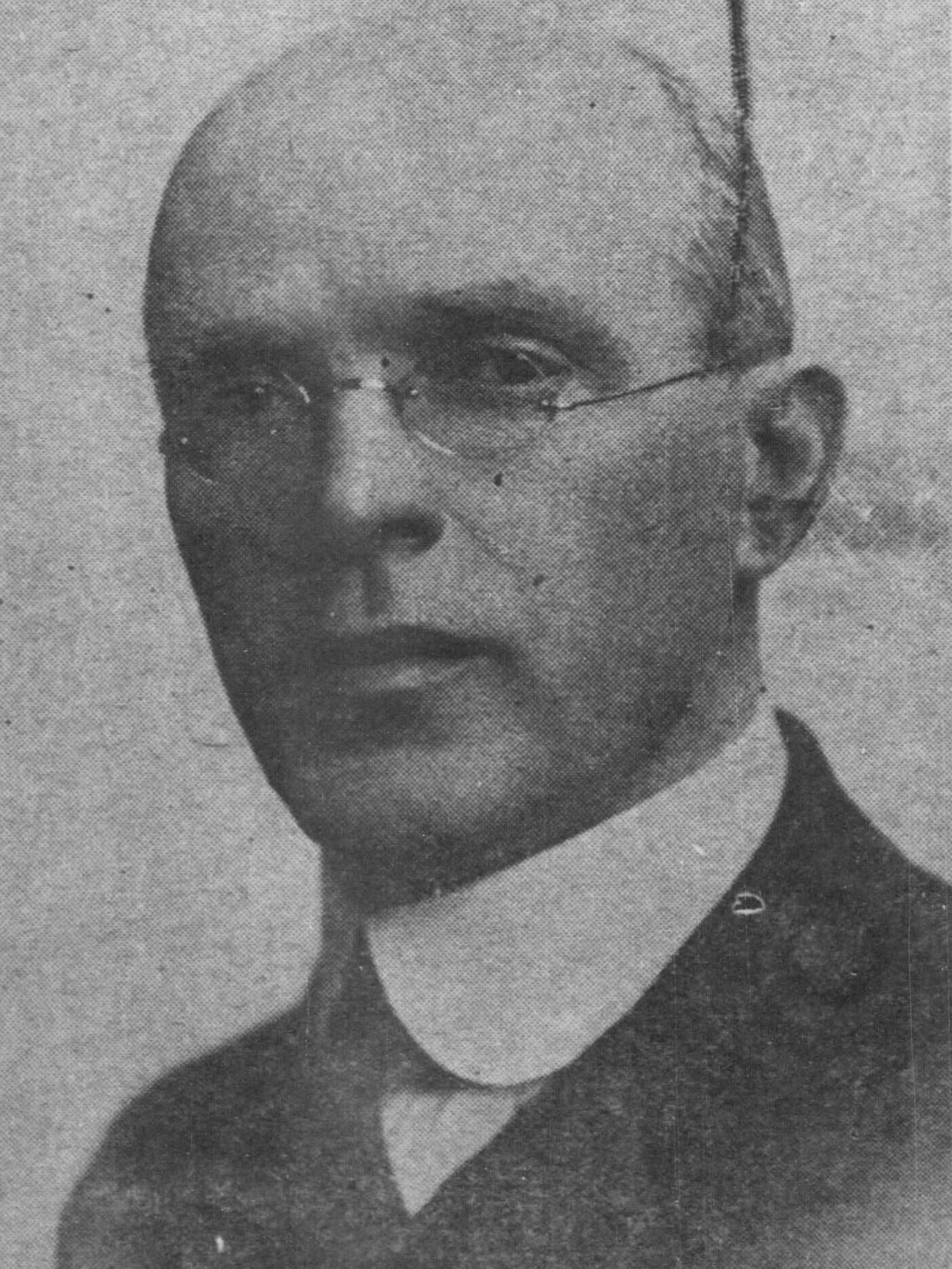
Terence Moran

- Terence Moran (Democratic)
- John S. Boyle
- Paul M. Sheridan Sr.
- Paul M. Sheridan Jr.
- Anna Langford
- Eloise Barden
- Anna Langford
- Shirley Coleman
- JoAnn Thompson
- Toni Foulkes
- Stephanie Coleman (2019–present)

=== 17th Ward ===
- John H. Lyle (Republican)
- Robert E. Barbee
- James G. Coyle
- Frank J. Corr (Democratic)
- William T. Murphy
- Arthur A. Slight
- Charles Chew
- William H. Shannon
- Tyrone McFolling
- Allan Streeter
- Terry Peterson
- Latasha Thomas
- David H. Moore
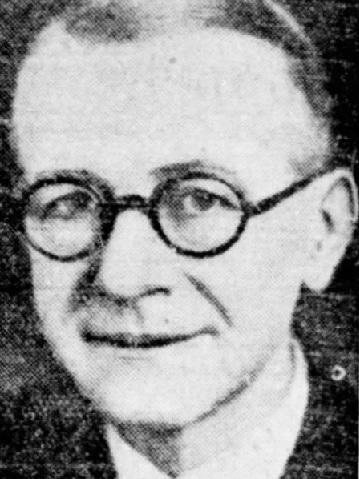
Frank J. Corr

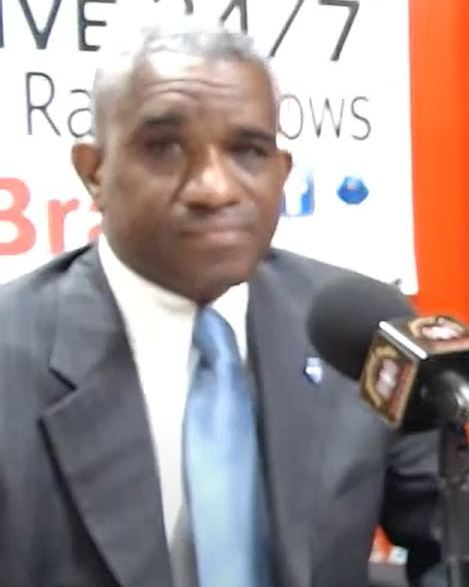
David H. Moore

=== 18th Ward ===
- Patrick F. Ryan
- Walter W. Morris
- Harry E. Perry (Democratic)
- Bernard J. O'Hallaren
- Thomas J. Corcoran
- Frank J. McGrath
- James C. Murray
- Edward J. Hines
- Robert T. Kellam
- Thomas W. Murphy
- Lona Lane
- Derrick Curtis

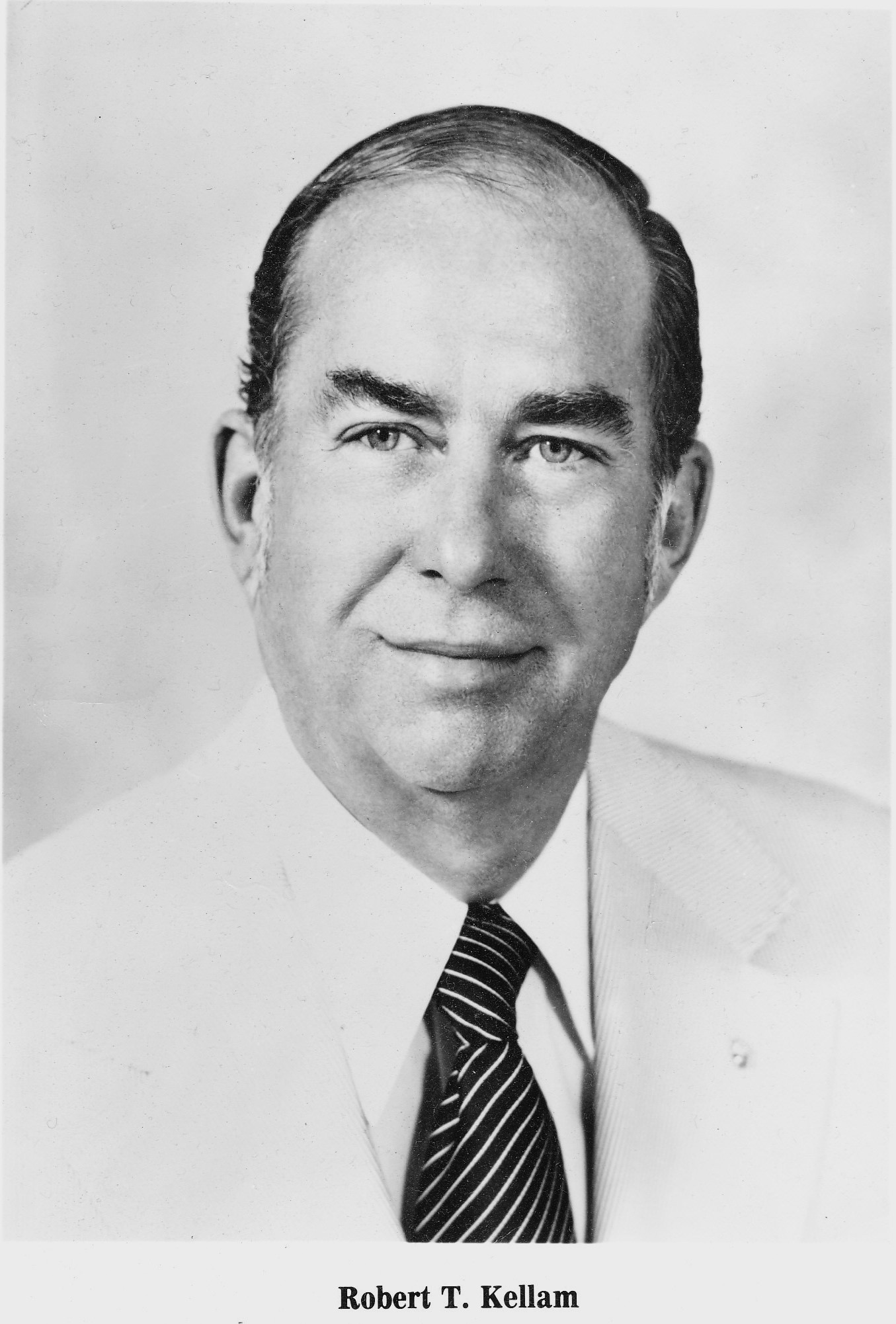
Robert T. Kellam

=== 19th Ward ===
No.	Alderperson	Term in office	Party	Notes
1	Donald S. McKinlay	April 16, 1923 – 1928	Democratic	Resigned to become a judge
2	O.E. Northrup	1929 – 1935	Republican	
3	John J. Duffy	1935 – December 1, 1950		Elected to the Cook County Board of Commissioners
4	David T. McKiernan	1951 – May 25, 1957		Died in office
5	Thomas F. Fitzpatrick	September 17, 1957 – April 1, 1975		
6	Jeremiah E. Joyce	April 1, 1975 – February 1, 1979	Democratic	Elected to the Illinois General Assembly for the 28th district
7	Michael F. Sheahan	April 16, 1979 – 1991	Democratic	
8	Virginia Rugai	1991 – 2011	Democratic	
9	Matthew O'Shea	2011 – present	Democratic	

== West Side (Wards 20–41) ==
=== 20th Ward ===
- Henry L. Fick
- A.J. Prignano
- William V. Pacelli (Republican)
- Anthony Pistilli
- Kenneth E. Campbell
- Clifford P. Kelley
- Ernest Jones
- Arenda Troutman
- Willie Cochran
- Jeanette Taylor

=== 21st Ward ===
- Dennis A. Horan
- John J. Lagodney (Democratic)
- Joseph F. Ropa
- Charles S. Bonk
- Samuel Yaksic
- Wilson Frost, Democratic
- Bennett Stewart, Democratic
- Niles Sherman
- Jesse J. Evans
- Leonard DeVille
- Howard Brookins Jr.
- Ronnie Mosley (2023-present)

=== 22nd Ward ===
- Joseph Cepak
- Henry Sonnenschein (Democratic)
- Otto F. Janousek
- Frank D. Stemberk
- Jesús "Chuy" García
- Ricardo Muñoz
- Michael D. Rodriguez

=== 23rd Ward ===
- Joseph O. Kostner
- John Toman (Democratic)
- Joseph Kacena Jr.
- George J. Tourek
- Frank J. Kuta
- Joseph Potempa
- Bill Lipinski
- William F. Krystyniak
- James Laski
- Michael R. Zalewski
- Silvana Tabares

=== 24th Ward ===
- Jacob Arvey (Democratic)
- Fred Fischman
- Louis London
- Sidney D. Deutsch
- Benjamin F. Lewis
- George W. Collins
- David Rhodes
- Walter Shumpert
- William C. Henry
- Jesse L. Miller Jr.
- Michael Chandler
- Sharon Denise Dixon
- Michael Chandler
- Michael Scott Jr.
- Monique Scott (2022-present)

=== 25th Ward ===
No.	Alderperson	Term in office	Party	Notes
1	John Powers	April 16, 1923 – 1927	Democratic	Had been serving then-19th ward since 1905 and previously from 1888 to 1904
2	James Bowler	1927 – June 7, 1934; February 26, 1935 – July 11, 1953	Democratic	Had previously served then-19th ward between 1906 and 1923; Briefly vacated office to become a Public Vehicle License Commissioner; Became a Congressman representing IL-7
3	Vito Marzullo	November 3, 1953 – 1985	Democratic	
4	Juan Soliz	1985 – 1991		
5	Ambrosio Medrano	1991 – 1996		
6	Daniel Solis	1996 – 2019	Democratic	
7	Byron Sigcho-Lopez	2019 – present	Democratic	

=== 26th Ward ===
No.	Alderperson	Term in office	Party	Notes
1	Joseph A. Mendel	April 16, 1923 – 1927		
2	Frank A. Sloan	1927 – 1933		
3	Frank E. Konkowski	1933 – 1939	Republican	Redistricted from the 31st ward Died in office
4	Alexander J. Sobota	1939 – June 23, 1944		Died in office
5	Mathew William Bieszczat	February 5, 1945 – November 8, 1960		Elected bailiff of Municipal Court of Chicago
6	Stanley M. Zydlo	February 26, 1963 – April 16, 1979		
7	Michael Nardulli	1979 – 1986		
8	Luis Gutiérrez	May 2, 1986 – December 12, 1992	Democratic	
9	Billy Ocasio	1994 – 2009	Democratic	
10	Roberto Maldonado	2009 – 2023	Democratic	
11	Jessie Fuentes	2023 – Present	Democratic	

=== 27th Ward ===
27th ward in 1923 2019

No.	Alderperson	Term in office	Party	Notes
1	John J. Touhy	April 16, 1923 – December 1, 1926	Democratic	Had been serving then-18th ward since 1917; Resigned to take office as a Sanitary District Trustee
2	Harry C. Van Norman	1927 – October 11, 1929	Democratic	Died in office
3	Jeremiah P. Leahy	April 25, 1930 – 1933	Democratic	
4	Harry L. Sain	1933 – February 23, 1971	Democratic (Note: Fremon p. 180)	
5	Eugene Ray	February 23, 1971 – 1983	Democratic	
6	Wallace Davis Jr.	1983 - 1987	Democratic	
7	Sheneather Y. Butler	1987 - 1991	Democratic	
8	Rickey R. Hendon	1991 – January 13, 1993	Democratic	Elected to the Illinois Senate for the 5th district
9	Dexter G. Watson	1993 – May 1995	Democratic	
10	Walter Burnett Jr.	May 1995 – August 2025	Democratic	
11	Walter Redmond "Red" Burnett III	September 2025 – present	Democratic	

=== 28th Ward ===
- George M. Maypole
- George D. Kells (Democratic)
- Patrick P. Petrone
- Anthony G. Girolami
- Alphonse Tomaso
- Angelo C. Provenzano
- Joseph Jambrone
- Jimmy L. Washington
- William Carothers
- Ed Smith
- Jason Ervin

=== 29th Ward ===
- Albert J. Horan
- Thomas J. Terrell (Democratic)
- Joseph S. Gillespie
- George R. Pigott
- Thomas F. Burke
- Robert Biggs
- Leroy Cross
- Danny K. Davis
- Sam Burrell
- Isaac Carothers
- Deborah L. Graham
- Chris Taliaferro

=== 30th Ward ===
- John S. Clark Jr. (Democratic)
- Edward J. Upton
- Edmund J. Hughes
- Daniel J. Ronan
- Edwin H. McMahon
- Elmer R. Filippini
- George A. Hagopian
- George J. Hagopian
- Carole Bialczak
- Michael Wojcik
- Ariel Reboyras

=== 31st Ward ===
No.	Alderperson	Term in office	Party	Notes
1	Stanley Adamkiewicz	April 16, 1923 – 1929	Democratic	Had previously served then-17th ward from 1917 to 1921
2	Frank E. Konkowski	1929 – 1933	Republican	Redistricted to the 26th ward
3	Thomas Patrick Keane	1933 – July 13, 1945	Democratic	Redistricted from the 34th ward Died in office
4	Thomas E. Keane	September 4, 1945 – October 9, 1974		Convicted of mail fraud and conspiracy
5	Adeline Keane	February 25, 1975 – 1979		
6	Chester Kuta	April 16, 1979 – November 30, 1981		Resigned
7	Joseph A. Martinez	December 11, 1981 – 1983		
8	Miguel Santiago	1983 - 1987		
9	Raymond Figueroa	1987 - 1991		
10	Ray Suarez	1991 – May 2015		
11	Milly Santiago	May 2015 – May 20, 2019		
12	Felix Cardona Jr.	May 20, 2019 – Present		

=== 32nd Ward ===
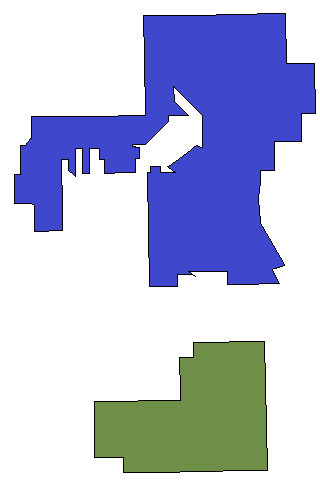
32nd ward in 1923 2019

No.	Alderperson	Term in office	Party	Notes
1	Joseph H. Smith	April 16, 1923 – 1933	Democratic	Had been serving then-14th ward since 1914
2	Joseph P. Rostenkowski	1933 – 1955	Democratic	Redistricted from 33rd ward
3	Bernard C. Prusinski	1955 – 1959		
4	Robert J. Sulski	1959 – November 28, 1968		Became a Circuit Court Judge
5	Terry Gabinski	March 12, 1969 – May 21, 1998	Democratic	
6	Theodore Matlak	May 21, 1998 – May 20, 2007	Democratic	
7	Scott Waguespack	May 20, 2007 – present	Democratic	

=== 33rd Ward ===
- Joseph Petlak
- George M. Rozczynialski
- Joseph P. Rostenkowski
- Zefiryn H. Kadow (Democratic)
- Vincent S. Zwiefka
- John B. Brandt
- Robert Brandt
- Rex Sande
- Richard Mell
- Deb Mell
- Rossana Rodriguez-Sanchez (2019–present)

=== 34th Ward ===
- Edward J. Kaindl
- Thomas Patrick Keane (Democratic)
- Matt Porten (Democratic)
- Herbert F. Geisler
- Rex Sande
- Wilson Frost
- Lemuel Austin Jr.
- Carrie Austin
- Bill Conway

=== 35th Ward ===
- George Seif (Democratic)
- Matt Porten
- Walter J. Orlikoski (Democratic)
- Frank Peska
- Casimir C. Laskowski
- John C. Marcin
- Joseph S. Kotlarz Jr.
- Michael A. Wojcik
- Vilma Colom
- Rey Colón
- Carlos Ramirez-Rosa
- Anthony Quezada

=== 36th Ward ===
- A.C. Sievers (Republican)
- Eugene L. Nusser
- George W. Robinson (Democratic)
- Richard M. Walsh
- Louis P. Garippo
- Frank Ringa
- Alfred J. Cilella
- Robert L. Massey
- John F. Aiello
- Louis Farina
- William Banks
- John Rice
- Nicholas Sposato
- Gilbert Villegas

=== 37th Ward ===
- Wiley W. Mills (Democratic)
- James H. Taylor
- Wiley W. Mills
- Roger J. Kiley (Democratic)
- Francis E. Callahan
- William J. Lancaster
- Paul T. Corcoran
- Thomas J. Casey
- Frank A. Damato
- Percy Z. Giles
- Emma Mitts

=== 38th Ward ===
No.	Alderperson	Term in office	Party	Notes
1	Max Adamowski	April 16, 1923 – July 16, 1929	Democratic	Had been serving then-22nd ward since 1916; Died in office
2	Frank H. Landmesser	1929 – 1933	Democratic	
3	Henry J. Wieland	1933 – 1935	Democratic	Democratic
4	Patrick J. Cullerton	1935 – April 17, 1958	Democratic	Elected Cook County Assessor
5	William J. Cullerton	1959 – April 14, 1973	Democratic	Died in office
6	Thomas W. Cullerton	November 27, 1973 – 1993	Democratic	Died in office
7	Thomas R. Allen	1993 – 2010	Democratic	Became a judge of the Cook County Illinois Circuit Court
8	Timothy Cullerton	2011 – 2013	Democratic	
9	Nicholas Sposato	2013 – present	Independent (since 2017); Democratic (before 2017)	Redistricted from 36th ward

=== 39th Ward ===
- Frank J. Tomczak (Democratic)
- Frank R. Ringa
- Walter J. Orlikoski
- James H. Hurley (Democratic)
- Hyman L. Brody
- Ray N. Jacobs
- George L. Buckley
- Phillip A. Shapiro
- Anthony C. Laurino
- Margaret Laurino
- Samantha Nugent

=== 40th Ward ===
- Christ A. Jensen (Democratic)
- John William Chapman
- Joseph C. Ross (Republican)
- Samuel Gurman
- Benjamin M. Becker
- Seymour Simon
- Nathan J. Kaplan
- Seymour Simon
- Solomon Gutstein
- Ivan Rittenberg
- Patrick J. O'Connor
- Andre Vasquez (2019–present)

=== 41st Ward ===
- Thomas J. Bowler (Democratic)
- James C. Moreland (Republican)
- William J. Cowhey
- Joseph P. Immel Jr.
- Harry Bell
- Edward T. Scholl
- Roman Pucinski
- Brian Doherty
- Mary O'Connor
- Anthony Napolitano

== North Side (Wards 42–50) ==
=== 42nd Ward ===
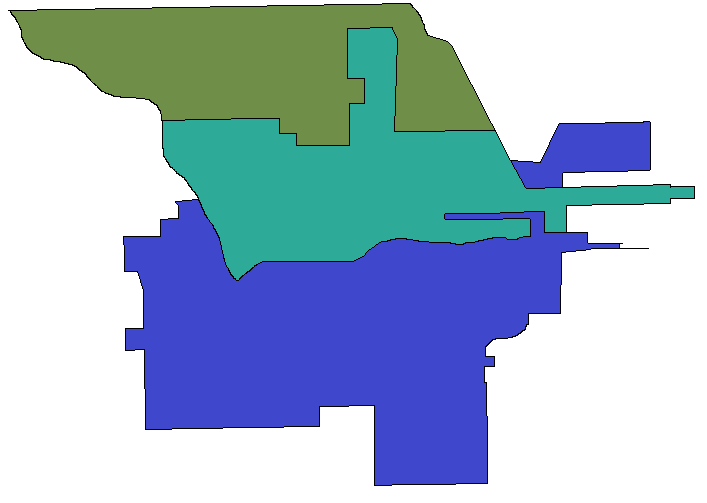
42nd ward in 1923 2019

This ward, historically covering most of the Near North Side, has recently moved slightly south to also encompass the northern part of the Loop.

No.	Alderperson	Term in office	Party	Notes
1	Dorsey Crowe	April 16, 1923 – July 1, 1962	Democratic	Had been serving then-21st ward since 1919; Died in office
2	Mayer Goldberg	February 26, 1963 – November 29, 1968	Democratic	Became a Circuit Court Judge
3	Raymond K. Fried	March 11, 1969 – January 26, 1970	Democratic	Died in office
4	Burton Natarus	1971 – 2007	Democratic	
5	Brendan Reilly	2007 – Present	Democratic	

=== 43rd Ward ===
No.	Alderperson	Term in office	Party	Notes
1	Arthur F. Albert	April 16, 1923 – October 31, 1927	Republican	Had been serving then-22nd ward since 1921; Albert lost the first round of the 1927 election to Haffa, but had been granted a runoff that he would win. However, the runoff was disputed and the Council unseated him in favor of Haffa, claiming that the judge who had granted the runoff had erred in counting spoiled ballots to determine the majority Haffa needed to avoid a runoff.
2	Titus Haffa	1927 – 1929	Republican	Disputed with Albert until October 31, 1927, see above.
1	Arthur F. Albert	1929 – 1931	Republican	
3	James B. Waller	1931 – 1933	Republican	
4	Paddy Bauler	1933 – April 9, 1943	Democratic	
3	James B. Waller	April 9, 1943 – 1947	Republican	
4	Paddy Bauler	1947 – 1967	Democratic	
5	George B. McCutcheon	April 4, 1967 – 1971	Republican	
6	William Singer	1971 – 1975		
7	Martin J. Oberman	1975 – 1987	Democratic	
8	Edwin Eisendrath	1987 – 1993	Democratic	
9	Charles Bernardini	1993 – 1999		
10	Vi Daley	1999 – May 16, 2011		
11	Michele Smith	May 16, 2011 – August 12, 2022	Democratic	
12	Timmy Knudsen	September 21, 2022 – Present	Democratic	

=== 44th Ward ===
- Thomas O. Wallace
- Albert Loescher
- John J. Grealis (Democratic)
- Leo C. Burmeister Jr.
- Thomas Rosenberg
- William Singer
- Dick Simpson
- Bruce Young
- John Merlo
- Bernie Hansen
- Tom Tunney
- Bennett Lawson

=== 45th Ward ===
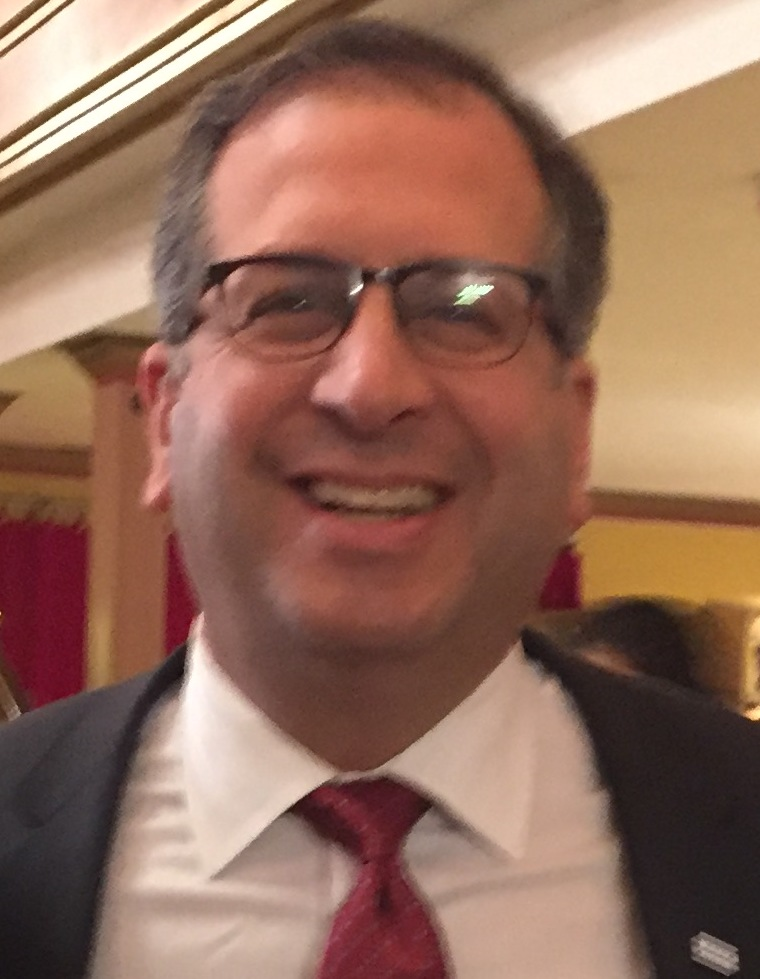
John Arena

- Leo M. Brieske
- William Feigenbutz
- Edwin F. Meyer (Democratic)
- Theron W. Merryman
- Charles J. Fleck
- Charles H. Weber
- Edwin P. Fifielski
- Richard S. Clewis
- Gerald McLaughlin
- Patrick Levar
- John Arena
- Jim Gardiner

=== 46th ward ===
- Oscar F. Nelson (Republican)
- James F. Young
- Joseph R. Kerwin
- Christopher B. Cohen
- Ralph Axelrod
- Jerome M. Orbach
- Helen Shiller
- James Cappleman
- Angela Clay

=== 47th Ward ===
No.	Alderperson	Term in office	Party	Notes
1	Harry W. Klinke	April 16, 1923 – 1925	Republican	
2	John J. Hoellen Sr.	1925 – 1933	Republican	
3	Albert F. Schultz	1933 – 1939	Democratic	
4	Frank O. Hilburn	1939 – 1947		
5	John J. Hoellen Jr.	1947 – 1975	Republican	
6	Eugene Schulter	February 25, 1975 – May 16, 2011	Democratic	
7	Ameya Pawar	May 16, 2011 – May 20, 2019	Democratic	
8	Matt Martin	May 20, 2019 – Present		

=== 48th Ward ===
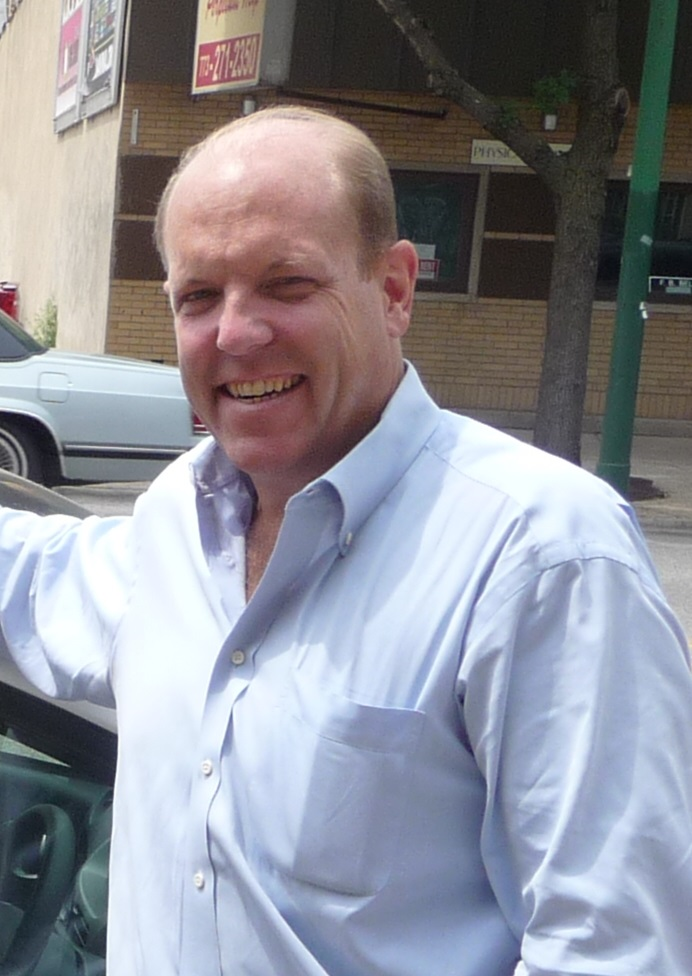
Harry Osterman

- Frank J. Link (Republican)
- Francis L. Boutell (1925 – December 1, 1926, resigned to join the Cook County Board of Commissioners, Republican)
- John A. Massen (Republican)
- Robert C. Quirk
- Allen A. Freeman
- Morris H. Hirsh
- Robert J. O'Rourke
- Marilou Hedlund
- Dennis H. Block
- Marion K. Volini
- Kathy Osterman
- Mary Ann Smith
- Harry Osterman
- Leni Manaa-Hoppenworth

=== 49th Ward ===
No.	Alderperson	Term in office	Party	Notes
1	Eli I. Frankhauser	April 16, 1923 – November 1929	Republican	Had been serving then-25th ward since 1921; Elected Superior Court Judge
2	George A. Williston	May 1930 – 1935	Republican	
3	Frank Keenan	1935 – December 1, 1950		Elected to Cook County Board of Tax Appeals
4	Thomas C. Keegan	1951 – November 1, 1951		Died in office
5	Brian J. Ducey	1951 – 1955		Resigned
6	David L. Hartigan	1955 – April 28, 1959		Died in office
7	Paul T. Wigoda	November 3, 1959 – October 10, 1974		Convicted of Income Tax evasion
8	Esther Saperstein	February 25, 1975 – April 16, 1979		
9	David Orr	1979 – 1990	Democratic	
10	Robert Clarke	1990 – 1991		
11	Joe Moore	1991 – May 20, 2019	Democratic	
12	Maria Hadden	May 20, 2019 – present		

=== 50th Ward ===
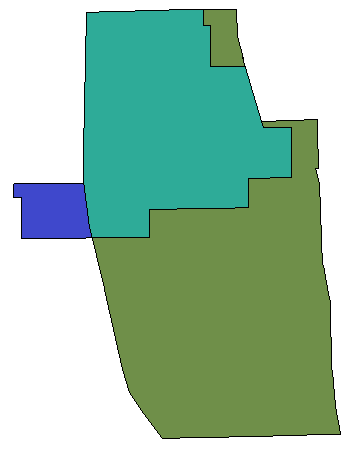
50th ward in 1923 2019

No.	Alderperson	Term in office	Party	Notes
1	William H. Pontow	April 16, 1923 – 1927	Democratic	
2	Aron K. Mose	1927 – 1929	Republican	
3	Curtis F. Mellin	1929 – 1931	Republican	
4	James R. Quinn	1931 – June 21, 1945	Democratic	Resigned
5	Jerome Huppert	September 4, 1945 – 1947		
6	Alban Weber	1947 – 1951		
7	Robert S. Bremer	1951 – 1955		
8	Jack I. Sperling	1955 – February 1, 1973	Republican	Became a Circuit Court Judge
9	Bernard Stone	1973 – 2011	Democratic (1973–1987; 1990–2011); Republican (1987–1990)	
10	Debra Silverstein	2011 – present		

== Bibliography ==
- Fremon, David K. (1988). Chicago Politics Ward by Ward. Bloomington, Indiana and Indianapolis, Indiana: Indiana University Press. ISBN 0-253-31344-9.
