= Christopher Cohen =

Christopher or Chris Cohen may refer to:

- Christopher A. Cohen, American producer, stage manager and director
- Christopher B. Cohen, Chicago politician
- Chris Cohen (footballer), English football coach and former player
- Chris Cohen (musician), American musician and former member of Deerhoof
