= Marty Quinn (Illinois politician) =

American politician

Member of the Chicago City Council from the 13th ward
- Incumbent
- Assumed office May 16, 2011
- Preceded by: Frank Olivo

Personal details
- Born: 1974 or 1975 (age 51–52)
- Party: Democratic
- Education: Saint Xavier University (BA)

Marty Quinn (born 1974/1975) is an American politician who has served as the alderman for the 13th ward of the Chicago City Council since May 2011 as a member of the Democratic Party. His ward offices are in the Balzekas Museum of Lithuanian Culture. He was elected in 2011, and has been reelected in 2015 and 2019. In July 2026, Quinn announced that he would not seek re-election to a fifth term in 2027.

== See also ==
- List of Chicago alderpersons since 1923
