= Nicholas Sposato =

American politician

Nick Sposato
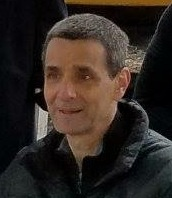

Member of the Chicago City Council from the 38th ward
- Incumbent
- Assumed office May 18, 2015
- Preceded by: Timothy Cullerton

Member of the Chicago City Council from the 36th ward
- In office May 16, 2011 – May 18, 2015
- Preceded by: John Rice
- Succeeded by: Gilbert Villegas

Personal details
- Born: October 7, 1958 (age 67) Chicago, Illinois, U.S.
- Party: Democratic (Before 2017); Independent (2017–present)
- Website: Official website

Nicholas Sposato (born October 7, 1958) is an American politician who serves on the Chicago City Council as alderman of the 38th Ward of the City of Chicago on the city's Far Northwest Side. Sposato was elected as alderman for the 36th ward in 2011 in an election against incumbent John Rice, who was endorsed by then Mayor-elect Rahm Emanuel. After City Council wards were re-districted, Sposato was re-elected as alderman for the 38th ward in 2015, 2019, and 2023.

== Background ==
Nicholas Sposato was born October 7, 1958, in Chicago, Illinois.

Before being elected to City Council, Sposato was a firefighter for 18 years and served on the Local School Council of Sayre Language Academy and president of the Trinity High School Father's Club.

Sposato has multiple sclerosis and uses a wheelchair.

== Aldermanic career ==
In 2011, Sposato was elected the serve as the 36th ward alderman, unseating incumbent John Rice. In the 2015, he was redistricted and won election in 38th ward. He won reelection in 2019.

Ald. Sposato serves on six City Council committees: Public Safety, Special Events, Cultural Affairs and Special Events, License and Consumer Protection, Housing and Real Estate, and Committees, Rules and Ethics.

In the runoff of the 2019 Chicago mayoral election, Sposato joined Chicago Firefighters Union Local 2, to which he belonged, in endorsing Lori Lightfoot.

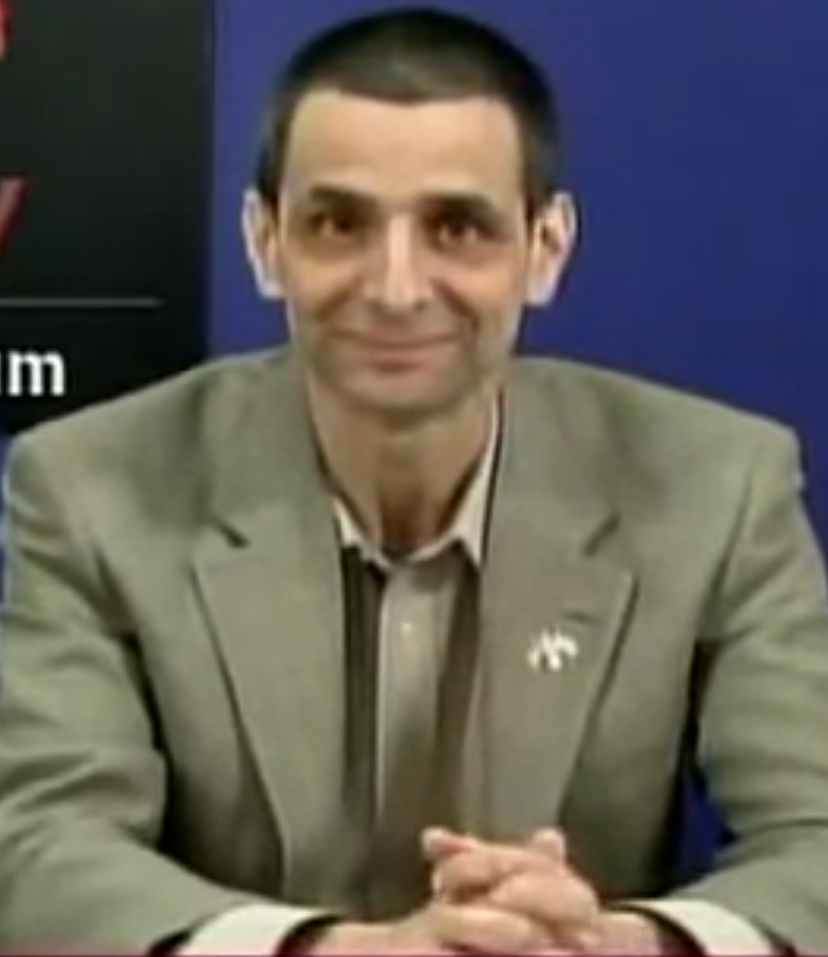
Sposato in 2013

Sposato's politics have shifted to the political right over the course of his aldermanic tenure. Sposato was a member of the Chicago City Council Progressive Reform Caucus, but left the group in December 2016. By 2020, he was declaring his support for Republican President Donald Trump and describing himself as a "rightie".

Sposato says he didn't leave the Democratic Party but that the party has moved too far to the left. Tension had also been building within the caucus due to Sposato's refusal to support police-accountability measures. Sposato worries about socialists and "Commies" having too much influence in society. At a hearing about the fate of a Christopher Columbus statue in Chicago's Grant Park, Sposato said, "It's getting a little frustrating because we're letting the Commies win."

Sposato is a social conservative when it comes to race and LGBTQ issues, and has faced criticisms for remarks on these subjects. When it was reported that people of color were issued more tickets in Chicago than white Chicagoans, Sposato offered an alternative explanation to counter arguments that others had made that the concepts of white privilege and institutional racism offered explanations for this racial discrepancy, with Sposato being quoted as remarking that, "White people just know how to talk their way out of a ticket." Sposato raised the ire of Black aldermen during a committee hearing when he questioned why people from a predominantly Black area of the city had traveled to the Northwest Side of the city, which is predominantly white. Sposato came under criticism from the LGBTQ community for misusing the term "identifying as." This arose when, amid COVID-19 pandemic local media asked Chicago aldermen about their COVID vaccination status, leading Sposato to offer a response that quipped, "You can identify as whatever you want these days, can't you? I identify as a vaccinated person." LGBTNation responded to this by saying, "This is part of a long pattern of people misconstruing the concept of gender identity as simply stating that a person is whatever they want to be – often just to win an argument or get some material benefit – instead of expressing a deep sense of one's own reality and living as a person's authentic self."

== See also ==
- List of Chicago alderpersons since 1923
