= David H. Moore =

American politician

David Moore
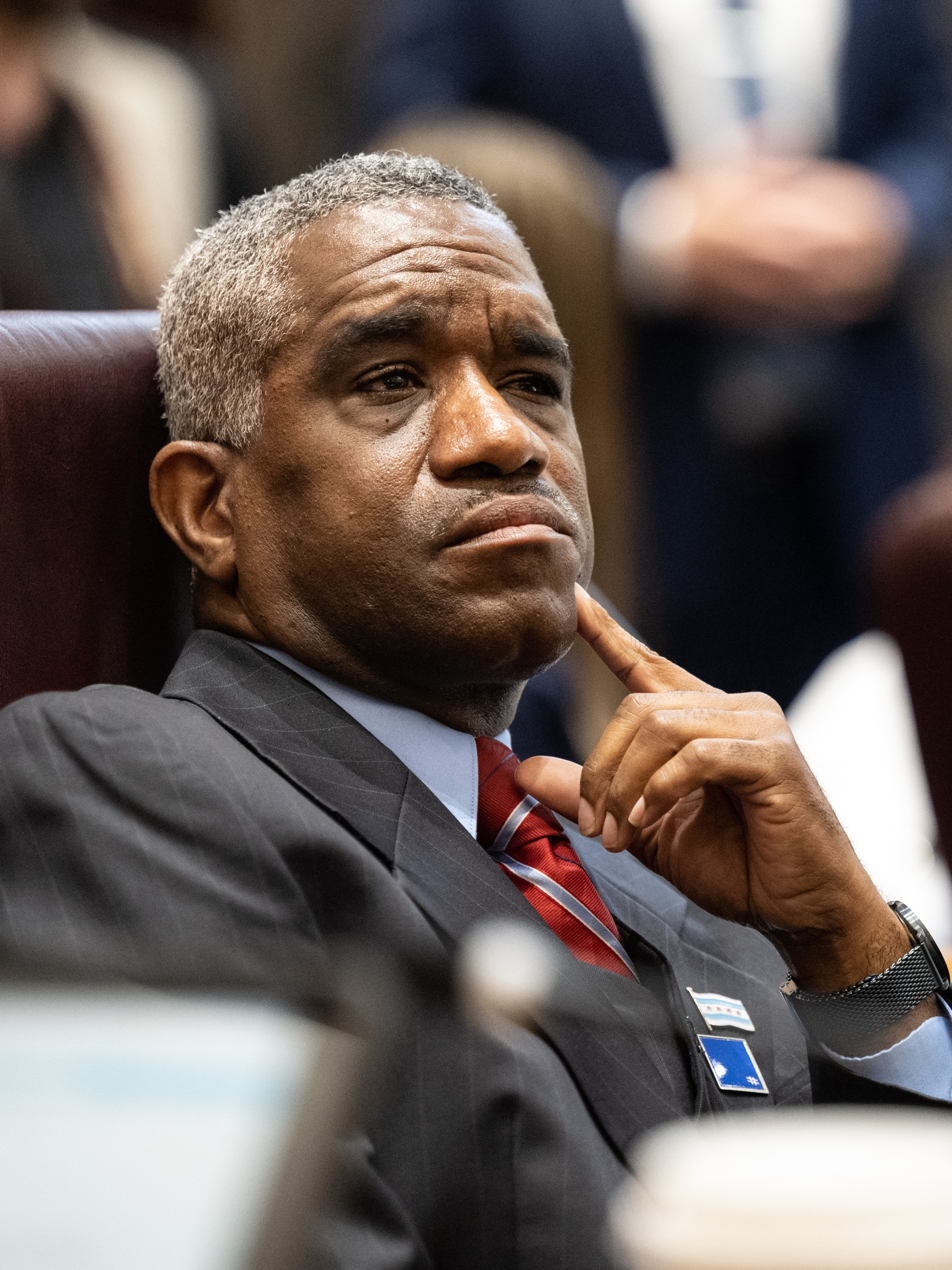
- Moore in 2023

Member of the Chicago City Council from the 17th ward
- Incumbent
- Assumed office May 18, 2015
- Preceded by: Latasha Thomas

Personal details
- Born: February 21, 1966 (age 60) Chicago, Illinois, U.S.
- Party: Democratic
- Education: Western Illinois University (BBA); Loyola University Chicago (MA)

David H. Moore is an American politician and member of the Chicago City Council serving as alderman for the 17th ward since May 18, 2015. The 17th ward includes portions of Auburn Gresham, Englewood, Chicago Lawn, Marquette Park and West Englewood.

== Early life and career ==
Moore was raised in the Robert Taylor Homes until age 11 when his family moved in with an uncle. After hearing Harold Washington speak during one of his congressional reelection campaign appearances he decided to get politically involved. He then graduated from Simeon Vocational High School and double majored in accounting and operations management at Western Illinois University. When he returned home, he joined Alderman Terry Peterson's 17th ward Democratic organization. He eventually rose to be the organization's field director and treasurer. He worked as an accountant at several Fortune 500 companies. He earned an M.A. with a focus in urban government from Loyola University. He moved from the private sector to become finance officer for the Chicago Department of Aviation and later an assistant commissioner for the Cook County Board of Review.

== Chicago City Council ==
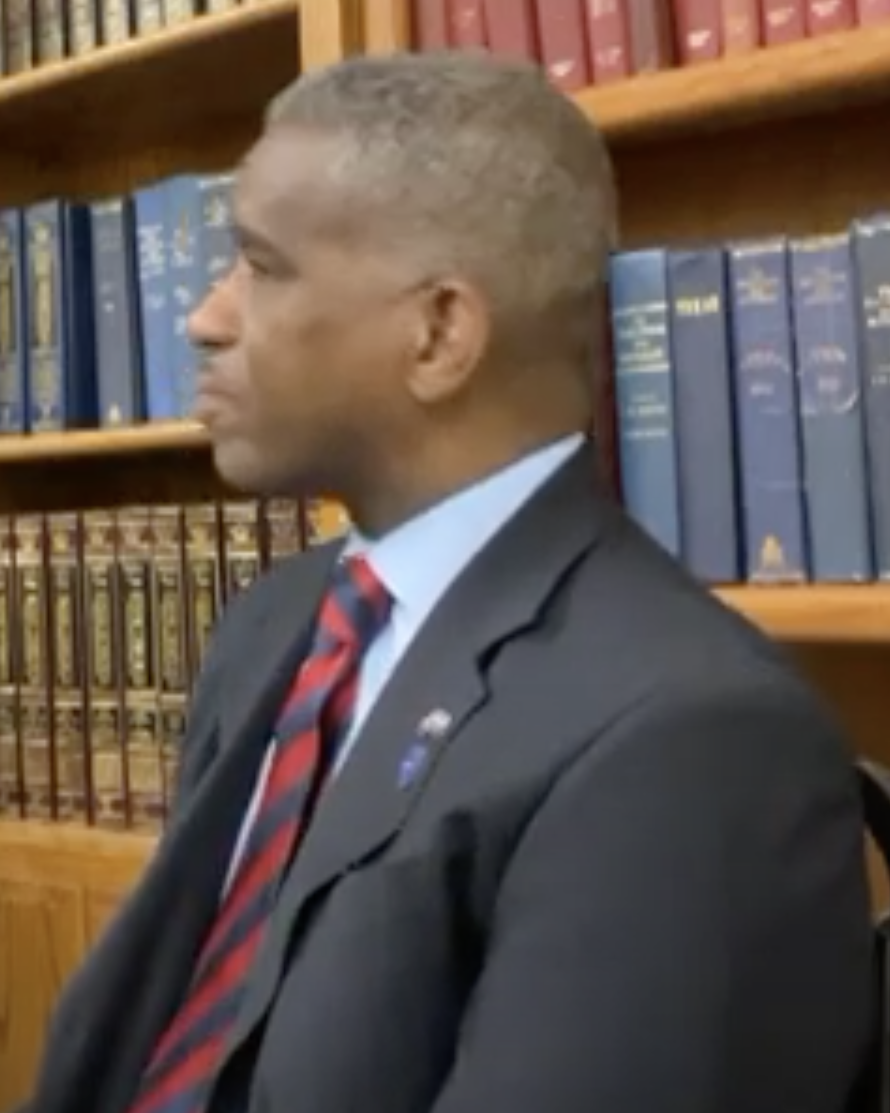
Moore interviewed in 2022

In 2011, he ran for alderman against incumbent Latasha Thomas, losing by 327 votes in the runoff election. In 2015, he ran again against Thomas staffer Glenda Franklin. An opponent of the school closings by Rahm Emanuel, he endorsed Emanuel's opponent Chuy García. After winning the February primary election, he was sworn into office on May 18, 2015. He joined the Progressive Reform Caucus before being sworn in. In August 2015, he was attacked while on a neighborhood patrol. In 2016, he was elected Democratic Committeeman for the 17th ward. He was reelected to the City Council in 2019.

Moore is a member of the Council's Progressive Reform Caucus.

=== Committee assignments ===
Moore is assigned to the following committees; Committees, Rules and Ethics; Economic, Capital and Technology Development; Housing and Real Estate; Human Relations; License and Consumer Protection; Zoning, Landmarks and Building Standards.

== Secretary of state campaign ==
In May 2021, Moore announced that he would be running in the 2022 election for Illinois secretary of state. He was soundly defeated, getting less than 10% of the vote.

== See also ==
- List of Chicago alderpersons since 1923
