= P. J. Cullerton =

American politician (1897–1981)

- portrait of Cullerton during his tenure as County Assessor

Cook County Assessor
- In office April 1958 – December 1974
- Preceded by: John McGuane
- Succeeded by: Tom Tully

Member of the Chicago City Council from the 38th ward
- In office April 1935 – April 17, 1958
- Preceded by: Henry J. Wieland
- Succeeded by: William J. Cullerton

Personal details
- Born: Patrick Joseph Cullerton; January 30, 1897
- Died: January 26, 1981 (age 83) St. Anne's Hospital, Chicago, Illinois
- Party: Democratic
- Education: Lewis Institute
- Nickname(s): P. J. Cullerton; Parky Cullerton

Patrick Joseph Cullerton (January 30, 1897–January 26, 1981), better known as "P. J. Cullerton" or "Parky Cullerton", was an American politician who served as Cook County Assessor from 1958 until 1974 and the Chicago City Council alderman for the 38th ward from 1935 until 1958.

== Early life ==
Cullerton was born January 30, 1897. He graduated from Crane High School, and studied for two years at the Lewis Institute.

Cullerton trained to become an electrical engineer, going into business alongside his father and working for Commonwealth Edison before venturing into politics full time.

== Political career ==
A Democrat, Cullerton was a political ally of Chicago Mayor Richard J. Daley and Daley's political machine in the Cook County Democratic Party. He was also a member of the Cullerton political family, which originated with his granduncle Edward Cullerton (a longtime Chicago alderman in the 19th and 20th centuries). The Cullerton family have been prominent in Chicago and Illinois politics for generations.

Cullerton started in politics as a precinct captain in the 38th ward. He became the ward's Democratic committeeman within a number of years and holding it until his death.

In the early 1930s, Cullerton was appointed by Mayor Anton Cermak as a signal engineer for the Chicago Police Department. He was soon appointed by Cermak to the city's board of local improvements.

=== Chicago City Council (1935–58) ===
Cullerton served as the 38th ward alderman on the Chicago City Council from 1935 through 1958. Cullerton's election in 1935 had come after a previous unsuccessful aldermanic campaign in 1931.

Cullerton rose to become an influential member of the council, and an overall influential Chicago politician. By 1951, he was assumed the powerful chairmanship of the City Council Finance Committee. He also chaired the council's emergency committee tasked with investigating fraud and abuse in the city government. In his tenure on the council, none of the ordinances he introduced ever were defeated, all being adopted.

While he had been allied with Mayor Martin Kennelly, he broke from Kennelly to endorse Richard J. Daley's campaign ahead of the Democratic primary election for the 1954 Chicago mayoral election. This established a lasting alliance between the Cullerton family and the Daley family. Daley prevailed in the primary, in part due to a large vote share in Cullerton's ward.

A number of other members of the Cullerton family have since represented the 38th ward. These include his brother William J. Cullerton (who immediately succeeded him), his grandnephew Thomas W. Cullerton, his great-grandnephew Timothy Cullerton, as well as family in-law Thomas R. Allen.

=== Cook County Assessor (1958–74) ===
In 1954, Cullerton ran a successful campaign for Cook County Assessor with Mayor Daley's endorsement. incumbent Democratic assessor Frank Keenan had supported Kennelly over Daley in 1955, making him a target of the Daley machine. In April 1958, the office became vacant early, and Cullerton was appointed to it. After he took office as assessor, Daley appointed his brother William J. Cullerton as his aldermanic successor. Cullerton easily won a full term as assessor later that year.

Serving as assessor from 1958 until 1974, Cullerton won re-election to the office in 1962, 1966, and 1970.

In 1970, Culelrton faced scandal amid allegations that he was deliberately under-assessing skyscrapers in The Loop as well as industry-owned properties. In 1971, after the scandal, Cullerton appointed Tom Tully deputy assessor, tasking him with reforming the Assessor's office. In 1973, eighteen employee's of the Assessor's office were convicted of bribery, and rumors circulated that Cullerton himself may have accepted a $250,000 bribe from a parking garage owner. An investigation by the Illinois Senate assigned no blame to Cullerton. While he never faced charges, the scandal helped led to the end his tenure. He had originally intended to seek re-election in 1974. However, Chicago Alderman Edward Vrdolyak led an effort to have him denied slating (endorsement ahead of the primary election) by the Cook County Democratic Party organization, and Cullerton decided to forgo re-election and in favor of a candidacy by Tully (who Cullerton and Daley endorsed). Tully was able to secure the county party slating, but Vrdolyak opted to run against him in the primary. Tully defeated Vrdolyak, and won the general election.

== Personal life and death ==
Cullerton was Irish-American. Cullerton and his wife, Charlotte Cullerton (née Snow), had one child: their daughter Helen C. Liddy (née Cullerton). Cullerton was widowed when his wife died in 1976. His daughter Helen and her husband, Harold, had four children and many grandchildren of their own.

Cullerton was known for his relatively short stature, standing 5 feet 5 inches (1.65 m).

Cullerton died on January 26, 1981 at St. Anne's Hospital in Chicago. He had been admitted to the hospital on January 10 with acute respiratory failure. He was days shy of his 84th birthday when he died. Two days after his death, Congressman Frank Annunzio spoke before the United States House of Representatives to deliver official remarks commemorating Cullerton.

The month after his death, his daughter Helen and two of her adult children (Cullerton's twin granddaughters Patricia Johnson and Kathleen Montgomery) were all killed on February 27 when their car was struck by a wrong-way driver on the Chicago Skyway, causing a five-car collision which involved one additional fatality. Cullerton's son-in-law Harold also died in June of the same year.
