= Latasha Thomas =

American lawyer

City of Chicago Alderman
- In office 2000–2015
- Preceded by: Terry Peterson
- Succeeded by: David Moore
- Constituency: 17th Ward, Chicago

Personal details
- Born: Latasha R. Thomas; May 2, 1965 (age 61) Chicago, Illinois, U.S.
- Party: Democratic Party
- Spouse: Timothy Thomas Jr. (m. 1987)
- Children: 2
- Education: Kenwood Academy; University of Illinois Urbana-Champaign; DePaul University

Latasha R. Thomas (born May 2, 1965) is an American politician and former alderman of the 17th Ward of the City of Chicago, Illinois, United States. Thomas was appointed to the position of alderman by Mayor Richard M. Daley in 2000, subsequently elected outright in a 2001 special election, and was re-elected in 2003, 2007, and 2011. During her tenure as alderman, Thomas worked to get many of the schools within her ward renovated. In the fall of 2014, Thomas announced that she would not seek re-election in 2015 as alderman, following the announcement that a former employee would run in her place.

== Early life, education, and career ==
Thomas was born in 1965, the eldest of the four children. Thomas attended Oglesby elementary school which is located in the 17th Ward, and later Kenwood Academy. After high school, Thomas earned her bachelor's degree from the University of Illinois Urbana-Champaign and her Juris Doctor degree from DePaul University College of Law in 1994. Thomas clerked for judge Odas Nicholson in the Cook County Circuit Court. Thomas was Director of Intergovernmental Relations for the City of Chicago Department of Human Services, a commercial litigator in private practice, and chief of staff for Alderman Terry Peterson of the 17th Ward.

== Political career ==
=== Aldermanic ===
Mayor Richard M. Daley of Chicago appointed Thomas alderman in 2000 to replace Peterson, who had become chief executive of the Chicago Housing Authority. Thomas was elected outright in a 2001 special election, and was reelected in 2003, 2007, and 2011. Thomas served on five City Council committees: Buildings; Committee, Rules and Ethics; Parks and Recreation; Special Events and Cultural Affairs; and Zoning. She remained the Chairman of the Education committee. In the year between April 2007 and April 2008, the Education Committee met three times.

In 2008, Thomas voted with Daley to lease out the city's parking meters. Thomas voted against Mayor Daley only once in Daley's sixth and final term, the four-year period 2007–2011. She voted against restricting street performers in Grant Park. Thomas was elected Democratic ward committeeman from the 17th Ward in 2004.

== Personal life ==
Thomas has been married to Timothy Thomas Jr since 1987. Timothy Thomas was First Deputy Commissioner in the Chicago Department of Cultural Affairs, the number-two post in that department. He was investigated by the Office of the Inspector General of the City of Chicago, who recommended he be disciplined for a patronage violation. He resigned on December 3, 2009, just weeks after city officials did not act on the Inspector General's recommendation. During the City Council hearings on the next budget the following year, Thomas accused City Inspector General Joe Ferguson of targeting African Americans. Ferguson denied the charge. Latasha and Timothy have two children; Victoria and Timothy III.
