= Harry C. Van Norman =

American politician

Harry C. Van Norman (May 16, 1874 – October 11, 1929) was a member of the Illinois House of Representatives for the 2nd district from 1924 to 1927 and alderman of Chicago's 27th ward from 1927 until his death after a long illness in 1929. In both capacities he represented a significant portion of Chicago's Near West Side where he lived. A Democrat, he served alongside fellow Democrat Frank Ryan and Republican Peter S. Krump in the House, and had previously run unsuccessfully for the House in 1922. After his death he was succeeded by Democrat Jeremiah P. Leahy in the Chicago City Council in April 1930. Van Norman was born in Sauk Centre, Minnesota and moved to Chicago. He was involved with the furniture business and with real estate.

== See also ==
- List of Chicago aldermen since 1923

Preceded by John J. Touhy	Member of the Chicago City Council; 27th ward 1927 – October 11, 1929	Vacant Title next held by Jeremiah P. Leahy
