= Jim Gardiner (Chicago politician) =

Chicago city councilor

Member of the Chicago City Council from the 45th ward
- Incumbent
- Assumed office May 20, 2019
- Preceded by: John Arena

Personal details
- Born: April 17, 1976 (age 50)
- Party: Independent (before 2019); Democratic (2019–present)
- Education: Saint Xavier University (BA)

James M. Gardiner (born April 17, 1976) is a Chicago politician and firefighter who serves as the alderman for the 45th ward in the Chicago City Council. Elected to the Chicago City Council in 2019, Gardiner identified as a political independent; however, he would later switch to the Democratic Party and served as the 45th Ward Democratic Committeeperson.

While in office, Gardiner became involved in several controversies, including an abuse of power lawsuit, alleged ethics violations, and using misogynistic language.

== Background ==
Gardiner was born on April 17, 1976, to Irish immigrant parents, the youngest of seven children. He graduated from Notre Dame High School and from Saint Xavier University in 2002 with a degree in teaching. Gardiner is a firefighter with the Chicago Fire Department, but has taken a leave of absence.

== Political career ==
In the February 2019 Chicago City Council election, Gardiner defeated incumbent John Arena, obtaining 50.9% of the vote to Arena's 36.2%. Gardiner was elected to the 45th Ward Democratic Committeeperson position in March 2020, defeating challenger Ellen Hill by 292 votes. In 2024, he did not seek re-election to be the committeperson.

Gardiner is a member of the Democratic Party, but identified as an independent before 2019. Gardiner believes in the legalization and taxation of recreational marijuana. Gardiner is not in favor of an increase in property taxes, municipal taxes, and real estate transfer taxes. He is also not in favor of the LaSalle Street Tax. Gardiner does not believe stricter gun control laws will reduce the amount of illegal firearms, but believes educating the youth on the dangers of illegal guns will help reduce gun violence. When campaigning, Gardiner said he believes in keeping Chicago a sanctuary city, and preventing the Chicago Police Department from detaining illegal immigrants, however, on January 27, 2021, Gardiner was one of eight Aldermen to vote against strengthening the City's Welcoming City ordinance.

In the 2023 aldermanic election, Gardiner faced five challengers. Prior to the election, Axios noted that Gardiner could be helped by a redistricting that made his district more conservative. The Chicago Tribune endorsed Megan Mathias in the election. In the general election, Gardiner received 48% of the votes, resulting in a runoff between him and Mathias, who was second place and received 16.86% of the vote. Gardiner won the runoff with 55.22% of the vote.

=== Controversies and legal issues ===
Justin Kaufman wrote in Axios that Gardiner is the "most controversial alder in the council."

In November 2020, Gardiner was sued for alleged abuse of power and false arrest of a ward resident. Gardiner's co-defendants include 45th Ward Superintendent Charles Sikanich and seven Chicago police officers. The lawsuit alleges that Gardiner used his capacity as an alderman to have a construction worker arrested after he found a ward workers cell phone that was mistakenly left at a 7-Eleven; in March 2022, a federal judge green lighted the lawsuit to continue. The City of Chicago ultimately paid a $100,000 fine as a result of this lawsuit.

Federal officials are investigating allegations that Gardiner has taken bribes and demanded payments for actions. No charges have cemented from the investigation.

In 2021, a federal lawsuit was filed, Czosnyka v. Gardiner: 21-cv-3240, alleging that Gardiner violated the First Amendment by blocking critics from his official Facebook page. The lawsuit highlighted issues of free speech and the right of constituents to engage with their elected officials on social media. In 2023, federal judge Sharon Johnson Coleman ruled that Gardiner's actions violated the First Amendment, marking a significant victory for plaintiffs in the case.

In September 2021, private text messages between Gardiner and Alderman Scott Waguespack revealed Gardiner using disparaging and misogynistic language to describe Waguespack's female chief of staff. The comments were condemned by many Chicago political leaders, including Mayor Lori Lightfoot. Gardiner apologized for the statements.

In July 2023, the Board of Ethics found probable cause that Gardiner violated the Government Ethics Ordinance, according to sources of Block Club Chicago and Chicago Sun-Times. The charges stem from an investigation by the Chicago inspector general, and it's the first-time probable cause has been established in an investigation related to an alderman. In 2019, Gardiner allegedly, in an act of retaliation, directed city employees to give a $600 citation to a political opponent for overgrown weeds and rodents at the man's residence. Gardiner was fined $20,000 by the Board of Ethics.

== See also ==
- List of Chicago alderpersons since 1923
