= Harry L. Sain =

American politician

Harry L. Sain (August 26, 1893 – October 20, 1975) was an American politician who served as alderman of Chicago's 27th ward from 1933 to 1971. He was a longtime associate of ward committeeman John J. Touhy and a dominant figure in local Democratic politics, turning his ward into one of 11 that could be guaranteed to deliver large Democratic majorities. He long headed the Committee on Committees and Rules, which was responsible for assigning aldermen to various committees. Democratic committeeman Ed Quigley decided to replace him with African-American Eugene Ray upon taking office in 1968, by which time the 27th ward had become almost entirely African-American. In addition to his service on the City Council he served as an alternate delegate to the 1956 Democratic National Convention. He died of a heart attack in 1975.

== See also ==
- List of Chicago aldermen since 1923

== Bibliography ==
- Fremon, David K. (1988). Chicago Politics Ward by Ward. Bloomington, Indiana and Indianapolis, Indiana: Indiana University Press. ISBN 0-253-31344-9.

Preceded by Jeremiah P. Leahy	Member of the Chicago City Council; 27th ward 1933 – 1971	Succeeded by Eugene Ray
