= John Arena =

American politician

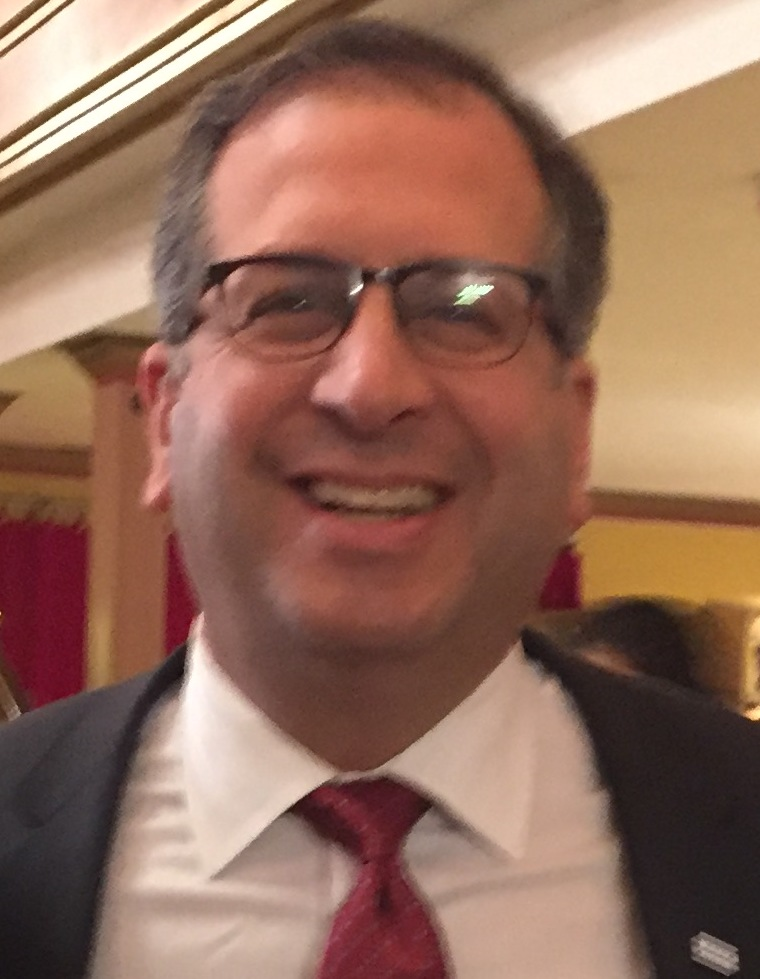

Member of the Chicago City Council from the 45th ward
- In office May 16, 2011 – May 20, 2019
- Preceded by: Patrick Levar
- Succeeded by: Jim Gardiner

Personal details
- Born: c. 1965-1966 Chicago, Illinois, U.S.
- Party: Democratic
- Spouse: Jill
- Children: Two
- Education: Northern Illinois University (B.A.)
- Profession: Politician

John Arena is an American politician. A member of the Democratic Party, he represented the 45th ward in the Chicago City Council from 2011 to 2019.

== Career ==
=== Aldermanic career ===
In 2011, Arena was elected as the alderman of the 45th ward. The 45th ward includes Portage Park, Gladstone Park, Mayfair, Edgebrook, Forest Glen and Jefferson Park.

In 2015, Arena was reelected to another four-year term in 2015. On February 26, 2019, Arena was defeated by challenger Jim Gardiner.

As an alderman, Arena was a member of the Committee on Aviation, Committee on Committees, Rules and Ethics, Committee on Economic, Capital and Technology Development, Committee on Finance, Committee on License and Consumer Protection and the Committee on Special Events, Cultural Affairs and Recreation. He is also a founding member of the Chicago Progressive Reform Coalition and the Democratic Ward Committeeman for the 45th Ward.

In May 2018, Arena was accused of entering a Chicago Police station and demanding to utilize free parking reserved for officers so he could attend a Chicago Cubs game.

As an alderman, Arena was noted as an advocate for developing affordable housing, even in communities where local residents opposed it. When public safety officials opposed his development plans on social media, Arena had the Anti Defamation League crosscheck their names with city employee databases. He then filed complaints with their respective departments accusing them of making "racially charged" comments. In December 2019, after two years of investigations, the Civilian Office of Police Accountability announced allegations made against 29 of the 31 officers accused were groundless. The investigation is still going on for the firefighters accused, with none of the accusations yet to be proven. As of September 2023, all of the allegations were still unproven.

Arena was also noted as one of the council's most vocal opponents to mayor Rahm Emanuel.

=== Post-aldermanic career ===
On September 30, 2019, Arena was hired by the administration of mayor Lori Lightfoot (whom he had endorsed in the runoff of the 2019 Chicago mayoral election) to work as a special advisor in the city's planning department. In December 2019, Arena's opponent James Gardiner claimed that Arena had engaged in political activity and had disrupted a community meeting. These claims may have led to Arena resigning from his job in the city's Planning Department the following month.

In 2025, Arena was hired by Mayor Brandon Johnson's administration to lobby Springfield legislators on the city's behalf.
