= Timothy Cullerton =

American politician

Timothy M. Cullerton

Member of the Chicago City Council from the 38th ward
- In office 2011–2015
- Preceded by: Thomas R. Allen
- Succeeded by: Nicholas Sposato

Personal details
- Party: Democratic

Timothy M. Cullerton is a former Chicago City Council member who represented the 38th Ward on Chicago's Northwest Side. He was appointed by Mayor Richard M. Daley in 2011.

== Background ==
Cullerton's grandfather, William Cullerton, father, Thomas W. Cullerton, and brother-in-law, Thomas Allen, also served as 38th Ward alderman; as did his great uncle Patrick J. Cullerton Cullerton is an electrician who served as chairman of the Chicago Electrical Commission.

Cullerton is a descendant of Edward "Foxy Ed" Cullerton, who was a member of the Chicago City Council first elected in 1871 (when it was still known as the Chicago Common Council), and who served until 1920 (at the time, having been the longest-serving alderman in the city's history, a title he would hold for many years). Edward Cullerton also simultaneously served as an Illinois State Senator, having been elected to that position in 1872.

Until Cullerton's retirement in 2015, for 144 years, a member of the Cullerton family had always sat on the Chicago City Council.

Cullerton's sister, Patti Jo "P.J." Cullerton, served as the 38th Ward Democratic Committeeman for over 20 years. Members of the Cullerton family have been a part of the 38th Ward Regular Democratic Organization as far back as the 1930s.

Cullerton is cousins with Illinois State Senate President John Cullerton, Illinois State Senator Tom Cullerton.

== Aldermanic career ==
In January 2011, Cullerton was appointed by Mayor Richard M. Daley to fill the vacancy left by 38th Ward alderman Thomas R. Allen resigning to become a judge on the Cook County Illinois Circuit Court. He was elected to a full term in a runoff election that April.

Cullerton served on six committees in City Council: Zoning, Landmarks and Building Standards; Housing and Real Estate; Rules and Ethics; Transportation and Public Way; Budget and Government Operations; Aviation.

Cullerton did not seek reelection in 2015. Cullerton had endorsed nonprofit executive Heather Sattler as his preferred successor, however, she lost to redistricted 36th Ward incumbent Nicholas Sposato.

== Electoral history ==
2011 Chicago 38th Ward aldermanic election
Candidates	General Election		Run-off Election	
	Votes	%	Votes	%
Timothy M. Cullerton	5,833	47.59	4,761	60.42
Tom Caravette	2,713	22.14	3,119	39.58
Bart Goldberg	956	7.80		
Carmen Hernandez	728	5.94		
Mahmoud Bambouyani	707	5.77		
Sheryl M. Morabito	676	5.52		
John R. Videckis	404	3.30		
Edmund "Ed" J. Quartullo	239	1.95		
Total	12,256	100	7,880	100
