= Thomas P. Keane =

American politician

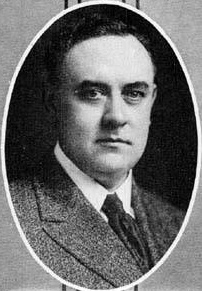
- official state representative portrait photograph

Member of the Chicago City Council from the 31st ward
- In office 1931 – July 13, 1945
- Preceded by: Frank E. Konkowski
- Succeeded by: Thomas E. Keane

Member of the Illinois House of Representatives
- In office 1918–1924
- In office 1928–1932

Personal details
- Born: March 18, 1878 Chicago, Illinois
- Died: July 13, 1945 (aged 67) Twin Lakes, Wisconsin
- Party: Democratic
- Occupation: Politician

Thomas P. Keane (March 18, 1878 – July 13, 1945) was an American politician,

== Biography ==
Keane was born in Chicago, Illinois. He went to the Chicago parochial and public schools. Keane was involved in the Democratic Party. Keane served the Illinois House of Representatives from 1919 to 1923 and from 1929 to 1931. He served as the Collector of the City of Chicago from 1923 to 1927. He served on the Chicago City Council from 1931 until his death in 1945. He died from injuries suffered as a result of a fall at his summer home in Twin Lakes, Wisconsin. His son was Thomas E. Keane who also served in the Illinois General Assembly and the Chicago City Council.
