= Christopher B. Cohen =

American politician and lawyer

Christopher Bittel Cohen was Alderman of the 46th Ward of Chicago from April of 1971 to November of 1977. He was first elected to the Chicago City Council on February 23, 1971, with 60% of the vote. Because he received an absolute majority, no contest was required on the April 6, 1971 run-off election date. This was the same election that brought the newcomers Dick Simpson (politician), Edward Vrdolyak, Clifford P. Kelley, Marilou Hedlund and Anna Langford (the first women ever elected) to the City Council. On February 25, 1975, Chris Cohen was reelected with 63% of the vote also requiring no contest in the subsequent April 1, 1975 runoff.

Chris Cohen was a leader in the so-called "Coffee Rebellion" which proposed an ordinance to increase aldermanic resources independently without first asking for permission of Mayor Richard J. Daley or 31st Ward Alderman Thomas E. Keane. Keane was Daley's floor leader and also served as Finance Committee chair. The ordinance Cohen drafted and introduced would have increased aldermanic expense accounts from $6,000 to $10,000 and provided each alderman a $12,000 per year administrative assistant. The ordinance was signed by 43 of the council's 49 aldermen.

At the time, the 50-member Chicago City Council was missing Ald. Robert Biggs who had recently passed away. Despite having 43 of 49 signatures, the proposed ordinance was never called for a hearing or for a vote. Reaction included the claim from 49th Ward Alderman Paul T. Wigoda who was also the law partner of Thomas E. Keane. Wigoda charged that Alderman Cohen planned to quit the majority faction in the Chicago City Council that normally sided with Mayor Richard J. Daley.

Frequent Daley critic and 5th Ward Alderman Leon Despres wrote that "...the status quo ... keeps the administration aldermen dependent, and financially hampers the effectiveness of non-administration aldermen. Ald. Christopher Cohen (46th) showed courage in initiating the amendment ... It will correct a long-standing injustice and improve the City Council."

On March 14, 1973, Ald. Keane announced he had filed an ordinance increasing the Mayor's salary from $35,000 to $75,000, increasing aldermanic salaries from $8,000 to $17,500 and increasing Keane's salary as Finance Committee chair from $11,000 to $20,500, all to take effect after April 1975 elections.

Eleven months after the election of Jimmy Carter as President of the United States, Cohen was named Midwest Regional Director of the United States Department of Health, Education, and Welfare to replace attorney Richard E. Friedman, a Republican, who had resigned the position. On November 3, 1977, Ald. Cohen resigned from the City Council and was sworn in by U.S. District Court Judge Joel Flaum as Regional Director of the United States Department of Health, Education and Welfare. The swearing -in took place at the US Social Security Administration's Midwest Processing Center at 600 W. Madison, Chicago – also known as the Baseball Bat Building due to the large public artwork outside the Building on Madison Street. Present on stage and speaking during the Swearing-in were Chicago Mayor Michael Anthony Bilandic and Secretary of the Department of Health, Education, and Welfare, Joseph A. Califano Jr.

In 1979, the Department of Health, Education, and Welfare (HEW) was separated into the US Department of Education (DOE) and the US Department of Health and Human Services (HHS). Cohen served as Principal Regional Official (Regional Director) of Midwest Region V for both HEW and HHS until he resigned effective February 20, 1980, following the election and inauguration of President Ronald Reagan. Cohen's predecessor as HEW Midwest Regional Director was attorney Richard E. Friedman who served as HEW Regional Director during the Administration of Presidents Richard Nixon and Gerald Ford.

Cohen is an attorney licensed to practice law in Illinois, Wisconsin and the District of Columbia. He graduated from Ann Arbor Pioneer High School in 1960, from the University of Michigan with a Bachelor of Arts degree in Political Science in 1964 and from the University of Michigan Law School in 1967 with a Juris Doctor degree.

Cohen was succeeded as 46th Ward Alderman by Ralph Axelrod in 1977, by Jerome M. Orbach, Helen Shiller in 1987 and by James Cappleman in 2011.

Cohen represented the Lincoln Park Gun Club which had been on Chicago's Lakefront for 72 years.

Mr. Cohen was born in 1942 in Washington D.C.. His parents were Wilbur J. Cohen and Eloise Bittel Cohen. Their other two children were Bruce B. Cohen (1944) and Stuart B. Cohen (1946). In January of 1956, the family moved from Silver Spring, Maryland to Ann Arbor, Michigan where Wilbur became a full professor in the University of Michigan's Social Work.

After graduating from the University of Michigan Law School in May of 1967, Cohen moved to Chicago. He lived in Gads Hill Settlement house and worked for United Charities Legal Aid. After being sworn into the Illinois Bar, he represented juveniles accused of law violations in the Cook County Juvenile Court. Subsequently, United Charities legal Aid became the Legal Assistance Foundation and the Cook County Public Defender's Office took over the role of defending juveniles.

Political Offices

Preceded by Ald. Joseph R. Kerwin Chicago City Council Member 46th Ward

Succeeded by Ald. Ralph Axelrod Chicago City Council Member 46th Ward
