= Bernard C. Prusinski =

American civil engineer and politician

Bernard C. Prusinski (June 7, 1906 – March 14, 1987) was an American civil engineer and politician.

Prusinski was born in Chicago, Illinois and went to the Chicago parochial and public schools. He studied civil engineering at Armour Institute and Lewis Institute. Prusinski also went to the Northwestern University and the University of Illinois at Urbana–Champaign. Prucinski also went to Roosevelt University to take course on labor relations. Pursinski served in the Illinois House of Representatives from 1951 to 1955 and was a Democrat. He then served on the Chicago City Council from 1955 to 1959. Pursinski then switch to the Republican Party. Pursinski prevented the demolition of the St. Stanislaus Kostka Church in Chicago for the construction of the Kennedy Expressway. Pursinski died at the Parkway Terrace Nursing Home in Wheaton, Illinois.
