= Robert Thomas Kellam =

American politician

Robert T. Kellam Sr.
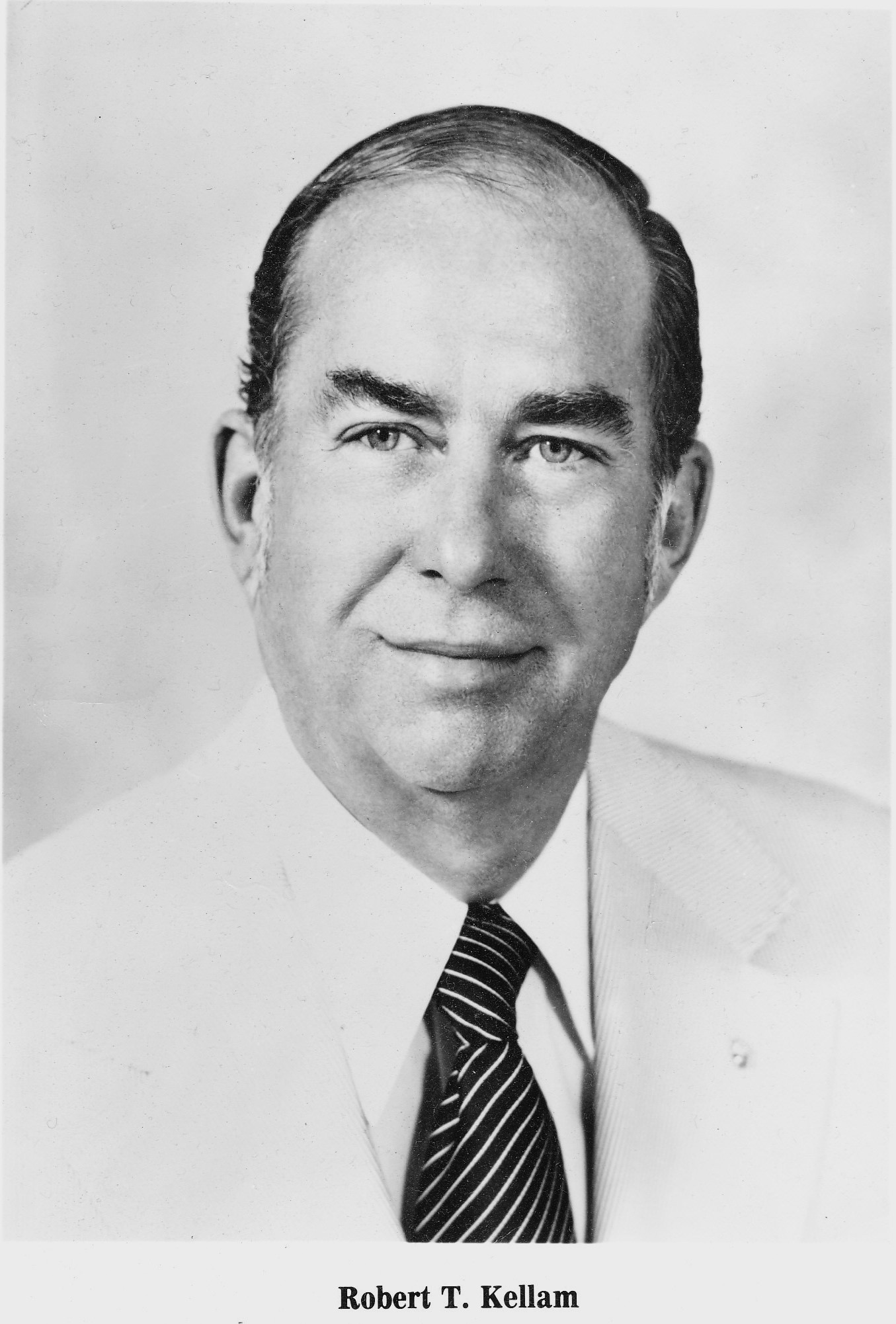
- Robert T. Kellam

Member of the Chicago City Council from the 18th Ward
- In office 1977–1991
- Preceded by: Edward Hines

Personal details
- Born: Robert Thomas Kellam; December 12, 1921 Chicago, Illinois, U.S.
- Died: July 13, 1996 (aged 74) Chicago, Illinois, U.S.
- Party: Democratic
- Spouse: Rosemary Kellam
- Children: 5
- Education: Mount Carmel High School; University of Illinois

Military service
- Branch/service: United States Army Air Corps
- Battles/wars: World War II

Robert Thomas Kellam Sr. (December 12, 1921 – July 13, 1996), commonly known as Bob Kellam, was an American Democratic politician who served as alderman of Chicago's 18th Ward from 1977 until his retirement in 1991. During his 14 years on the Chicago City Council, Kellam served during the administrations of five Chicago mayors.

A longtime participant in Chicago Democratic politics before his election to the council, Kellam's aldermanic career included the politically divisive Council Wars of the 1980s, during which he aligned with the council bloc led by Edward Vrdolyak. He later held council leadership positions including vice-chairman of the Committee on Finance and chairman of the Committee on Veterans' Affairs.

== Early life and education ==
Robert Thomas Kellam was born on December 12, 1921, in Chicago, Illinois. His World War II draft registration listed his birthplace as Chicago and his residence as 2216 East 70th Place on the city's South Side.

Kellam was raised on Chicago's South Side and attended Mount Carmel High School. He later attended the University of Illinois.

At the time of his World War II draft registration, Kellam was employed by Carnegie-Illinois Steel Corporation at its South Works in Chicago.

During World War II, Kellam served in the United States Army Air Corps in the South Pacific.

== Early political career ==
Kellam had a long association with Chicago's Regular Democratic organization before holding elective office. He served as a Democratic precinct captain and worked as an aldermanic aide, legislative aide and City Hall employee.

He also worked for the Chicago Traffic Safety Commission, where he served as publicity director.

By 1987, Kellam described his involvement with the Cook County Regular Democratic organization as spanning approximately 30 years.

== Chicago City Council ==
=== Election and early tenure ===
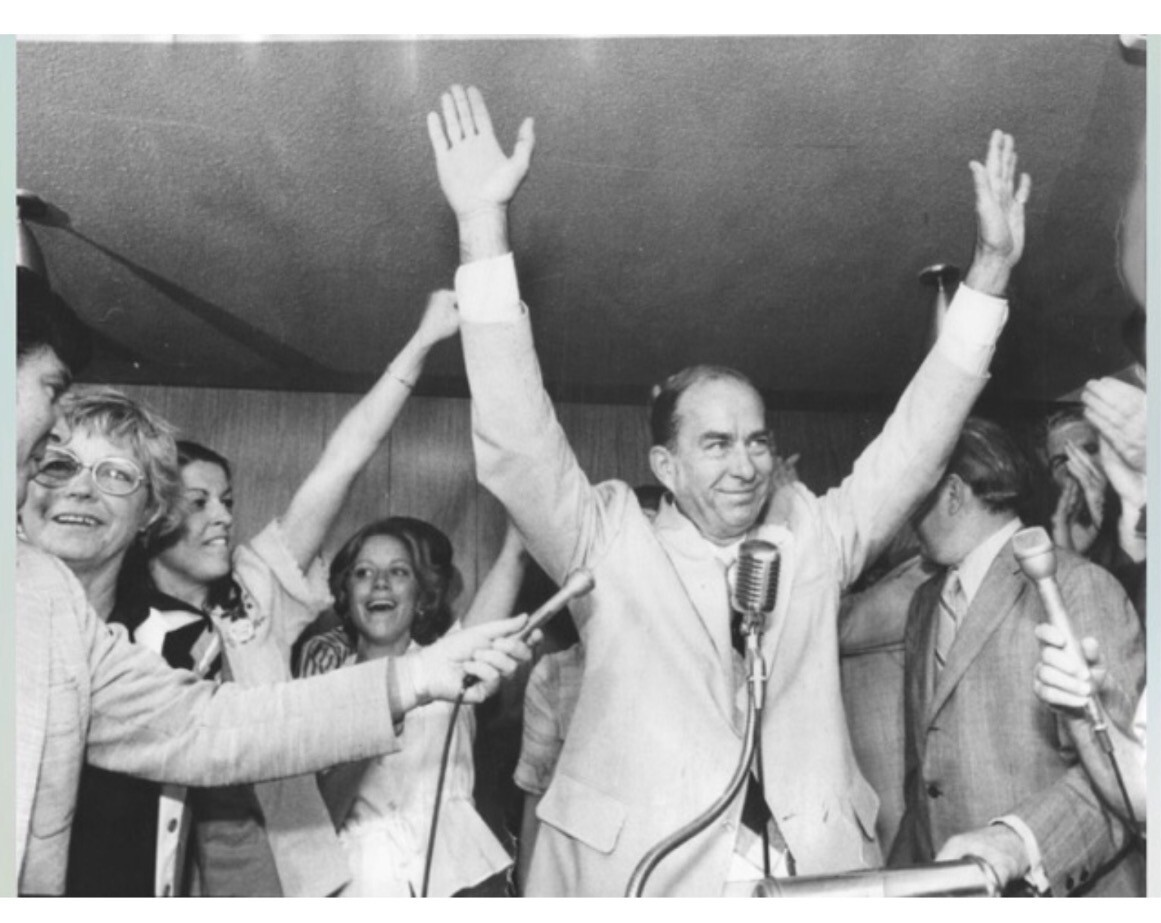
Kellam defeats McGann on election night, May 1977

Kellam was first elected alderman of Chicago's 18th Ward in a special runoff election on May 17, 1977, following the death of Alderman Edward Hines. Kellam defeated Andrew McGann, receiving 10,263 votes to McGann's 9,588.

Kellam subsequently won a full term in the 1979 municipal election. Facing Jerome Craven and John McCann, Kellam received 8,159 votes, or approximately 51 percent of the vote, enough to avoid a runoff.

He was reelected again in 1983, defeating George Eddings by 17,930 votes to 9,556.

=== Council Wars ===
Kellam's tenure included the period of political conflict in the Chicago City Council known as the Council Wars, which followed the 1983 election of Harold Washington as mayor.

During the conflict, Kellam aligned with the council bloc led by Alderman Edward Vrdolyak, which opposed Washington. Following court-ordered special aldermanic elections in 1986, the council was divided between 25 Washington supporters and 25 Vrdolyak supporters. A Chicago Tribune analysis of the new council specifically identified Kellam as a member of the Vrdolyak bloc.

Official City Council proceedings also document Kellam voting alongside Vrdolyak and other members of the council majority on contested matters during the Washington administration.

Kellam's opposition to Washington continued to be noted in contemporary coverage during the 1987 election cycle.

After Washington-aligned aldermen gained control of the council, Kellam joined Vrdolyak, Edward M. Burke and other opposition aldermen in voting against a reorganization of council committees.

=== Ward remapping and 1987 election ===
Kellam's later years in office coincided with significant changes to the boundaries and demographic composition of the 18th Ward. A federal court-ordered remapping of Chicago wards resulted in special aldermanic elections in 1986. Following the remap, the voting-age population of the 18th Ward was approximately evenly divided between Black and white residents.

Kellam retained his seat in the 1986 special election and sought another term in 1987. During the 1987 campaign, he was endorsed by the 18th Ward Regular Democratic organization, the firefighters' union and the Fraternal Order of Police.

During the campaign, Kellam said that one of his principal goals as alderman was preserving the quality of life in the 18th Ward and maintaining it as a community where families could raise and educate their children.

Kellam won reelection in 1987.

=== Committee and council work ===
Kellam held a number of committee assignments and leadership responsibilities during his City Council career.

During the 1980s, Kellam was active in matters before the council's Committee on Leases. In August 1983, nine proposed ordinances authorizing leases of property for use by city departments and agencies were passed on separate motions made by Kellam.

By 1986, land acquisition, disposition and lease matters were handled through the Committee on Land Acquisition, Disposition and Leases. Council proceedings from December 1986 record legislation reported through the committee being passed on Kellam's motion.

Following the election of Richard M. Daley as mayor in 1989, Kellam served as vice-chairman of the City Council Committee on Finance under chairman Edward M. Burke.

The 1989 council organization also assigned Kellam to the committees on Budget and Governmental Operations; Claims and Liabilities; Capital Development; Housing, Land Acquisition, Disposition and Leases; Historical Landmark Preservation; and Ports, Wharves and Bridges.

Later in 1989, Kellam became chairman of the City Council Committee on Veterans' Affairs following the death of its chairman, Alderman George Hagopian.

=== Ward and legislative activities ===
Kellam's work in the council included neighborhood traffic and infrastructure matters as well as citywide legislation.

In 1983, he introduced an order requesting a city survey concerning the installation of a stop sign at 86th Street and Komensky Avenue in the 18th Ward.

Kellam also participated in legislation affecting senior citizens and people with disabilities. In 1986, he co-sponsored a City Council resolution urging the Chicago Transit Authority to retain a special transfer program that permitted senior citizens and riders with disabilities unlimited travel in any direction for a two-hour period.

=== Retirement ===
Kellam chose not to seek another term in 1991 and retired from the Chicago City Council after 14 years in office.

Contemporary Chicago Tribune coverage of the 1991 municipal election described Kellam as the retiring alderman when discussing the open contest for the 18th Ward seat.

Over the course of his council career, Kellam served during the administrations of five Chicago mayors.

== Community and civic activities ==
Outside elected office, Kellam was active in civic, charitable and Catholic organizations.

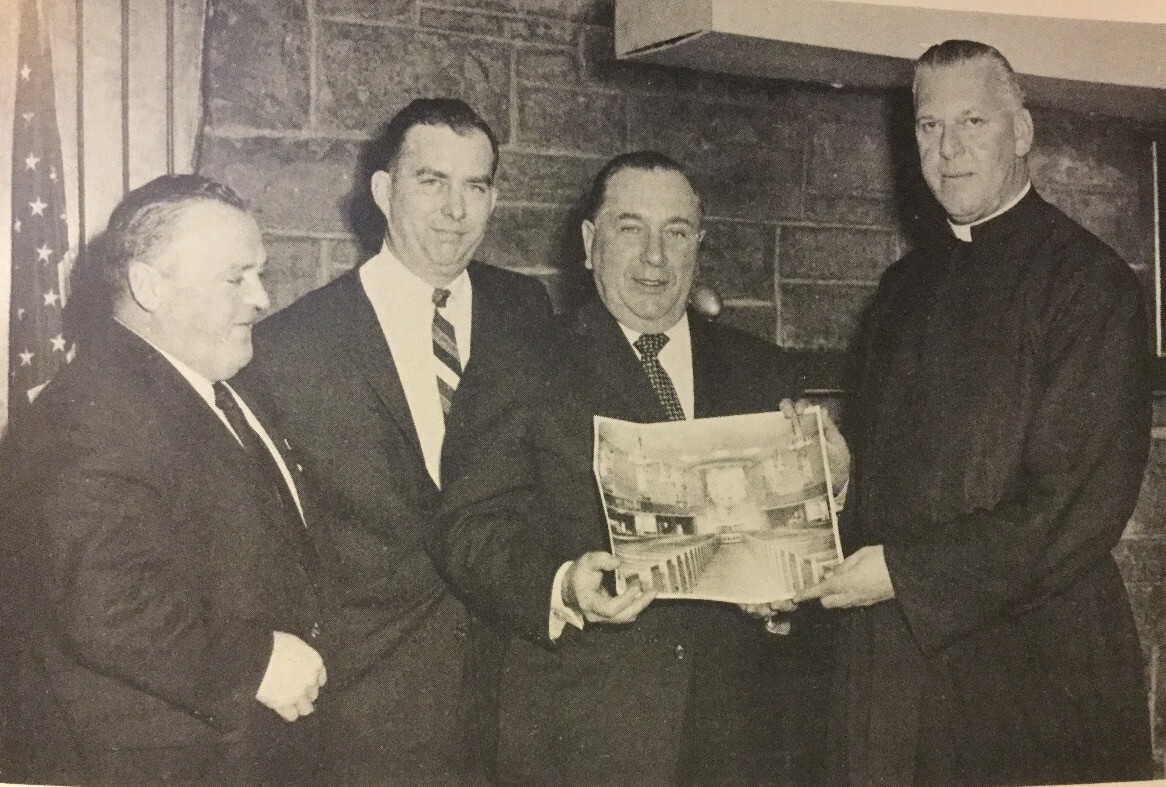
18th Ward Alderman Kellam, Mayor Richard J. Daley and Father Francis D. Hayes pastor of St. Thomas More.

He was a founding member of the Wrightwood Little League and served as its president. He was also active at St. Thomas More Catholic Parish, where he served as president of the parish's Holy Name Society.

Kellam was active in the Knights of Columbus and served as State Deputy of the organization in Illinois. His charitable activities through the organization included work benefiting people with disabilities.

A World War II veteran, Kellam also maintained an interest in veterans' issues during his public career, eventually serving as chairman of the City Council Committee on Veterans' Affairs.

== Personal life ==
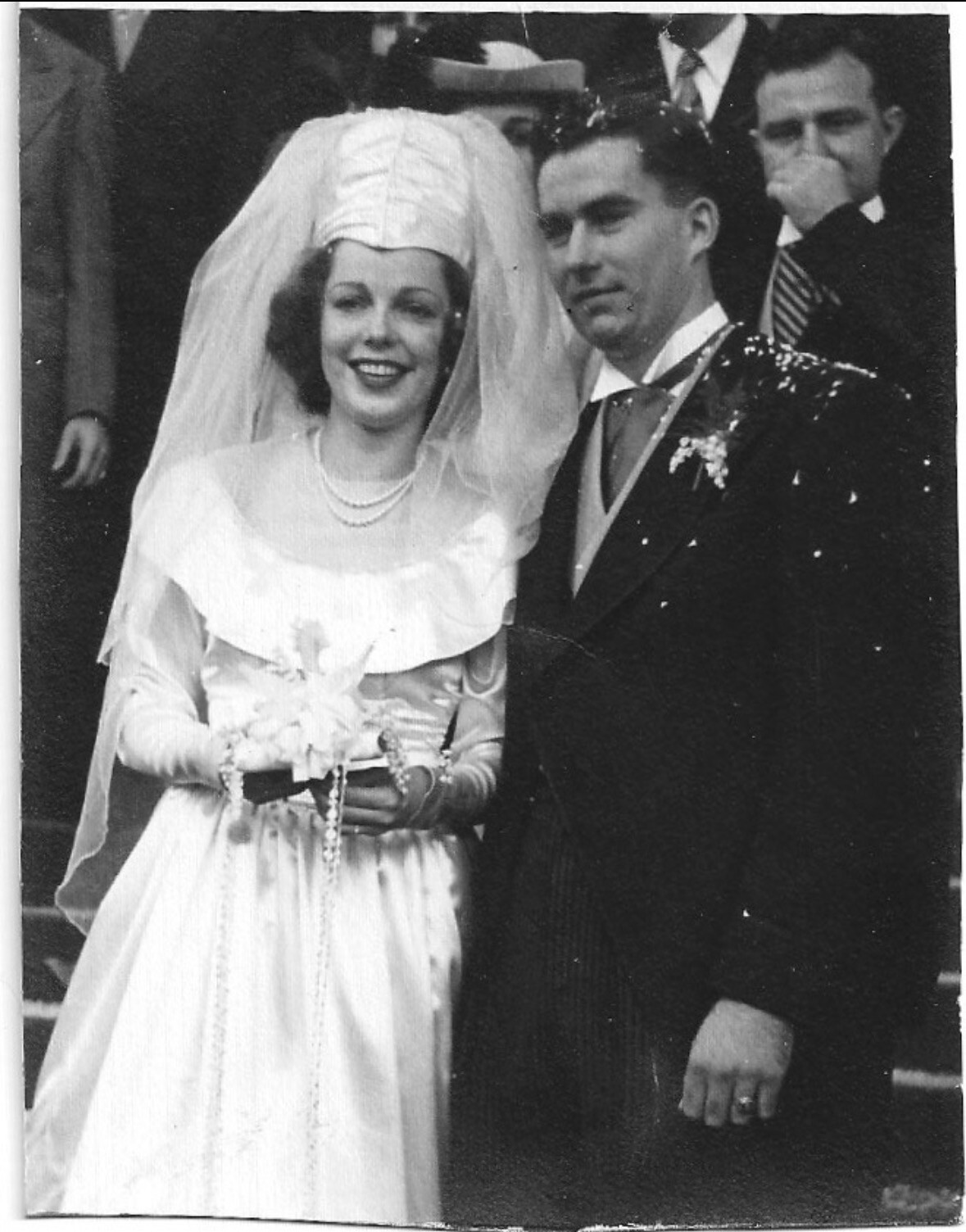
Bob and Rosemary Kellam

Kellam was married to Rosemary Kellam. They had five children: Robert T. Kellam Jr., Richard, Patrick, Kevin and Katy. At the time of Kellam's death, he had 14 grandchildren.

Kellam and his family lived on Chicago's Southwest Side.

He was commonly known as "Bob" among family, friends and associates.

== Death ==
Kellam died on July 13, 1996, after a long illness. He was 74 years old.

A funeral Mass was held at St. Thomas More Catholic Church in Chicago.

== See also ==
- Chicago City Council
- Council Wars
- Edward Vrdolyak
- Harold Washington
