= Frank Olivo =

American politician

Frank J. Olivo
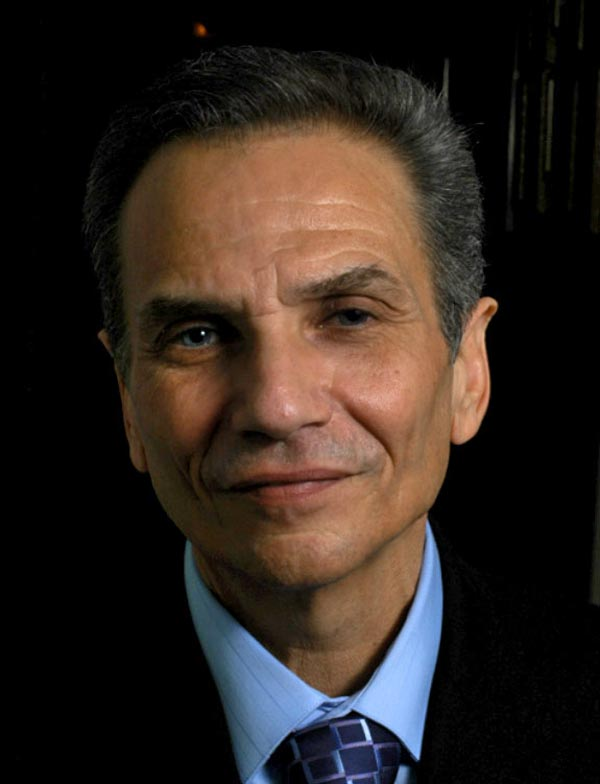
- City of Chicago Alderman, Democratic

Member of the Chicago City Council from the 13th ward
- Incumbent
- Assumed office 1994-2011
- Preceded by: John S. Madrzyk
- Succeeded by: Marty Quinn

Personal details
- Party: Democratic
- Spouse: Karen
- Children: Frank Jr., Dana and Anthony
- Education: Hubbard High School
- Website: Alderman Frank J. Olivo

Frank J. Olivo was alderman of the 13th ward of the City of Chicago.

== Alderman career ==
As Alderman of the 13th ward, Olivo co-founded the Graffiti Removal Program designed to combat crime, and the Real Estate Anti-Solicitation Program to protect the value of homes. Olivo serves on seven committees: Aviation; Budget and Government Operations; Committees, Rules, and Ethics; Finance; License and Consumer Protection; Traffic Control and Safety, and Zoning.

Olivo was the only alderman to report receiving gifts valued at more than $500 in 2006 on their required annual ethics disclosures. A die-hard White Sox fan, Olivo reported receiving: 68 Sox tickets valued at $2,556 and 22 "package passes" worth $308; 13 Chicago Bulls tickets valued at $1,315; $420 worth of St. Louis Cardinals tickets; $114 worth of Milwaukee Brewers tickets and 26 Chicago Cubs tickets and four package passes valued at $1,751.

Olivo co-sponsored a proposed amendment (PO2007-7206) to the Municipal Code of Chicago prohibiting the sale or possession of live chickens in residential districts in Chicago, which was introduced to the Chicago City Council and referred to the City Council's Committee on Health on September 27, 2007.

In 2008 Olivo was found to be one of seven Chicago aldermen who between them got ten of their children good-paying summer jobs with the Metropolitan Water Reclamation District of Greater Chicago.

== Professional career ==
Olivo served as a member of the Secretary of State's Motor Vehicle Review Board, a paid position on a board that mediates disputes between car dealers and manufacturers.
