= William Banks (alderman) =

American politician (born 1949)

William J.P. Banks

City of Chicago Alderman from the 36th Ward
- In office May 1983 – April 2009
- Preceded by: Louis Farina
- Succeeded by: John Rice

Personal details
- Born: William Joseph Panebianco Banks; July 28, 1949 (age 77) Chicago, Illinois, U.S.
- Party: Democratic
- Education: DePaul University (B.A., J.D.)
- Profession: Attorney

William Joseph Panebianco Banks (born July 28, 1949) is an attorney and former alderman of the 36th ward in Chicago from 1983 to 2009.

== Early career ==
Banks is Italian-American; to avoid anti-Italian bigotry, Banks' father, currency exchange owner Vincenzo Giuseppe Panebianco, anglicized his name to James Joseph and added "Banks" to their surname. All his sons continued to use "P" or "Panebianco" in front of "Banks."

Banks earned a B.A. degree in 1971 and a Juris Doctor degree in 1975 from DePaul University.

Before his election as alderman, Banks served as Chief Research Aide and Legal Counselor to Congressman Morgan F. Murphy. Later, Banks served as Assistant Corporation Counsel for the City of Chicago.

== Political career ==
Banks is the Democratic committeeman for the 36th Ward, a party position within the Cook County Democratic Party. Banks took over as committeeman when long-time ward committeeman Louis Garippo died in 1981.

Banks is chairman of two well-funded political action committees, the "Friends of William J P Banks" and the "Citizens to Elect Committeeman William J P Banks", and controls a third, the "36th Ward Regular Democratic Organization".

=== Aldermanic career ===
Banks was first elected alderman in 1983. Banks succeeded first-term alderman Louis Farina, who declined to run for re-election in 1983 under pressure from then Chicago Mayor Jane Byrne, because of Farina's imminent indictment. Farina was indicted on January 27, 1983 on charges of extortion and conspiracy to commit extortion, and was subsequently charged with accepting bribes to get the contractor's nephew a job at the airport and for fixing a drunk driving charge. Banks' 36th ward Democratic organization held a fund-raiser to help defray Farina's legal fees. Farina was convicted on December 7, 1983 and sentenced to four years, later reduced to three, and served 15 months.

An important facet of Banks' aldermanic career is his position as chair of the Zoning Committee of the Chicago City Council.

Banks has come under some scrutiny because his nephew, James J. Banks, is a zoning attorney and registered lobbyist, the busiest zoning lawyer in Chicago, who has a very high success rate in securing zoning changes. Banks recuses himself prior to all of James Banks' clients. (On October 11, 2007 then Illinois Governor Rod Blagojevich appointed James J. Banks as a salaried member of the Board of Directors of the Illinois Tollway Authority).

Banks said there is "nothing unusual" about donations to aldermen from developers or their attorneys.

In addition to the Zoning Committee, Banks served on seven other committees: Rules and Ethics; Aviation; Economic, Capital and Technology Development; Budget and Government Operations; Finance; and Housing and Real Estate. Mayor Richard M. Daley appointed Banks to lead the Commission of Zoning Reform. He is also a member of the Chicago Plan Commission.

Two city zoning inspectors with ties to Banks' 36th Ward organization were among more than a dozen defendants charged on May 22, 2008 by federal prosecutors in "Operation Crooked Code" who alleged bribery in the Daley administration's Buildings and Zoning Departments. Garneata pleaded guilty on May 14, 2009 in federal court to acting as a go-between in a bribe-for-permits scheme. Garneata admitted that, in December 2007, he acted as a go-between to pass on a bribe to a city plumbing inspector while pocketing some of the cash. Garneata was charged with passing a $7,000 bribe to the inspector, Mario Olivella, who was also charged in the scheme. Garneata is a onetime client of lobbyist James Banks. Garneata and his companies have made $23,000 in campaign contributions since 1999, including $4,000 to the 36th Ward Democratic Organization run by William J. P. Banks.

In late April, 2009, Banks announced his intention to retire from City Council and asked Mayor Daley to appoint his driver John Rice as his replacement.

== Professional career ==
While alderman, Banks worked as an attorney in private practice. Banks is a lobbyist registered with Cook County and the State of Illinois. Banks is co-counsel with Morrill and Associates, P.C., a law firm specializing in Illinois state and local government relations.

Banks is also Of Counsel with the law firm of his brother, criminal defense attorney and lobbyist Samuel V. P. Banks, which is also the law firm of Banks' nephew, zoning lobbyist James J. Banks. Belmont Bank & Trust, a bank in Banks' 36th ward, was founded in 2006 by and is owned by James J. Banks, who is also chairman of the bank's board of directors and the bank's landlord. Other directors of Belmont Bank & Trust include Samuel V. P. Banks (William's brother and law partner and James' father and law partner), State Senator James DeLeo, and waste management consultant Fred Bruno Barbara. Belmont Bank and Trust is a designated Municipal Depository bank for the City of Chicago.

After his retirement from Chicago City Council, Alderman Banks became a named partner in the firm Schain, Banks, Kenny & Schwartz, Ltd., where he practices as an attorney. He counsels clients on matters related to land use, real estate development, real estate tax reduction, litigation strategy, and state, county and federal government relations and approvals.

== Personal life ==
Alderman Banks lives in the Galewood neighborhood with his wife Shirley and their two children.

Bank's brother, Samuel Vincent Panebianco Banks, was an attorney who for years was synonymous with influence in Chicago's 36th Ward on the Far Northwest Side.Samuel V. P. Banks was a powerful behind-the-scenes figure in his brother William's 36th Ward Democratic organization. Samuel V. P. Banks made a name for himself as a criminal defense attorney representing Mob-linked and corruption defendants.
