= John Rice (alderman) =

American politician

City of Chicago Alderman from the 36th Ward
- In office October 6, 2009 – May 16, 2011
- Preceded by: William Banks
- Succeeded by: Nicholas Sposato

Personal details
- Party: Democratic

John Rice (c. 1968 – May 30, 2015) was an American politician. He was alderman of the City of Chicago, representing the 36th ward on the city's far northwest side, from 2009 to 2011.

== Political career ==
Rice was a member of the 36th Ward Regular Democratic Organization, one of Alderman William Banks' (36th) political action committees.

== Career in government ==
Rice worked for the Cook County Highway Department from 1991 to 1997. Rice had worked for the City of Chicago since October 1, 1997. Rice worked as a city zoning inspector from 1997 to 2005. Rice was a long-time employee of the Chicago City Council with a title of "Assistant to the Alderman," working as a driver to Banks.

== Appointment to City Council ==
In late April, 2009, Banks announced his intention to retire from City Council. Banks asked Mayor Richard M. Daley to appoint Rice as his replacement.

=== Rice organizes retirement party for Banks ===
While Rice was under consideration by Daley for appointment as alderman, Rice organized a $200-a-ticket retirement party for Banks at a Rosemont restaurant. Rice sent out invitations instructing those purchasing tickets to "make checks payable to William J. P. Banks (Memo -- Retirement Party)" and mail the checks to Rice's house. Days after a report in the Chicago Tribune, the party was cancelled.

=== Appointment, confirmation, and swearing-in ===
Daley announced the appointment of Rice, then 41, as the new 36th Ward alderman on Tuesday, October 6, 2009. The City Council unanimously approved the appointment the next day, Wednesday, October 7, 2009, and Daley swore in Rice. The appointment of Rice drew criticism from some in the local media. After Rice took office, he voted consistently in support of Mayor Daley's positions.

On April 5, 2011, Chicago firefighter Nick Sposato defeated Rice with 56% of the vote, 5,629 to 4,378. "It's a sad day for the people of the 36th Ward, because the people have no idea what they just did to themselves," Rice said.

== Post-aldermanic career ==
On November 21, 2011, Rice applied for and, on the same day, started a newly created, $84,420-a-year position as a deputy director of traffic safety with the Illinois Department of Transportation in the James R. Thompson Center across the street from Chicago City Hall. The opening was never posted.

Rice died at his home in River Grove on May 30, 2015.
