= Thomas R. Allen =

Alderman and judge (born 1952)

Judge on the Circuit Court of Cook County
- Incumbent
- Assumed office December 6, 2010

Chicago Alderman from the 38th Ward
- In office 1993–2010
- Preceded by: Thomas Cullerton
- Succeeded by: Timothy Cullerton

Personal details
- Born: 1952

Thomas R. Allen (born 1952) is a judge within the Illinois Circuit Court of Cook County. He was sworn in on December 6, 2010. Prior to his judgeship, he was Alderman of the 38th Ward of Chicago, serving since 1993.

== Early life ==
Allen graduated from Illinois Benedictine College and Kent College of Law. After graduation, he worked as a criminal defense attorney for 17 years.

== Public service ==
Allen served as an administrative and legislative assistant to Alderman Thomas Cullerton before succeeding him.

Currently, Allen is active in several community organizations: the Portage Park Advisory Board, the Irving Park YMCA, the Sunshine Activity Center for Mentally Handicapped, and the Polish American Police Association.

== Aldermanic career ==
Allen was appointed Alderman in 1993 by Mayor Richard M. Daley to complete the term of Thomas Cullerton, who died in office after a long illness. Allen was elected to a full term in 1995, and re-elected in 1999, 2003, and 2007.

As Alderman, Allen was concerned about illegally converted rooming houses. To combat this, Allen created a task force to identify, investigate, and close illegal rooming houses.

Allen was chairman of the Transportation and Public Way Committee. He also served on seven other committees: Aviation; Budget and Government Operations; Buildings; Committees, Rules and Ethics; Economic, Capital and Technology Development; Finance; and Zoning.

In 2008 Allen was found to be one of seven Chicago aldermen who between them got ten of their children good-paying summer jobs with the Metropolitan Water Reclamation District of Greater Chicago.

In 2008, Allen unsuccessfully sought the Democratic nomination in the election for Cook County State's Attorney.

In 2010 Allen cosponsored an ordinance with 30th Ward Alderman Ariel Reboyras that designated a stretch of Central Avenue in the vicinity of its intersection with Belmont Avenue as "Honorary Lech Kaczynski Way" to honor the deceased Polish President.

After Allen resigned from the City Council to assume his judgeship, Mayor Daley appointed his brother-in-law Timothy Cullerton to succeed him.

In 2021, Allen was appointed as a Cook County judge.
