= Thomas E. Keane =

American politician (1905–1996)

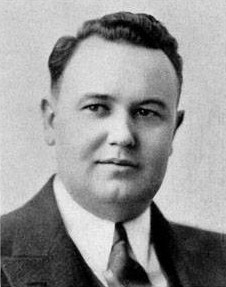

Member of the Chicago City Council from the 31st ward
- In office September 4, 1945 – October 9, 1974
- Preceded by: Thomas P. Keane
- Succeeded by: Adeline Keane

Member of the Illinois Senate from the 23rd district
- In office January 9, 1935 – September 4, 1945
- Preceded by: William F. Gillmeister
- Succeeded by: William J. Walsh

Personal details
- Born: September 29, 1905 Chicago, Illinois, U.S.
- Died: September 9, 1996 (aged 90) Chicago, Illinois, U.S.
- Party: Democratic
- Spouse: Adeline
- Children: 4
- Education: Loyola University (LLB)

Thomas E. Keane (September 29, 1905 - September 9, 1996) was an American politician. He served as a member of the Illinois Senate from the 23rd district from 1935 to 1945, and as an alderman of the Chicago City Council from the 31st ward.

== Early life ==
Thomas Keane was born in Chicago, Illinois to a Luxembourgish family. He received his law degree from Loyola University Chicago and practiced law in Chicago. He served in the Illinois Senate from 1935 to 1945.

== Chicago City Council ==
Keane served as the alderman of the 31st Ward of the City of Chicago. The son of alderman Thomas P. Keane and a member of the Democratic Party, he took his father's seat in the Chicago City Council in 1945, and represented part of the city's Northwest Side. Keane was once considered the second-most powerful politician in the city, exceeded only by his close personal ally Mayor Richard J. Daley. Keane chaired the Council's Finance Committee for many years. Mr. Keane's political career ended in 1974 with a federal conviction on mail-fraud and conspiracy charges related to real estate deals.

The United States Supreme Court subsequently held unconstitutional the portion of the mail-fraud law under which Mr. Keane was found guilty.

On October 2, 1996, the former alderman was posthumously honored for his "long distinguished career in the service of his community" by the full city council led by Mayor Richard M. Daley, the son of his late ally.

== Death ==
Keane died, on September 9, 1996, at Our Lady of the Resurrection Medical Center, in Chicago, from heart failure, aged 90.

Illinois Senate
Preceded by William F. Gillmeister	Member of the Illinois Senate from the 23rd district 1935–1945	Succeeded by William J. Walsh
Civic offices
Preceded by Thomas P. Keane	Member of the Chicago City Council from the 31st ward 1945–1974	Succeeded by Adeline Keane
