= Chicago City Council LGBT Caucus =

LGBT Caucus
- Chair: Lamont Robinson
- Founded: 2015; 11 years ago
- Seats in Chicago City Council: 9 / 50

The LGBT Caucus of the Chicago City Council is a bloc of aldermen in the Chicago City Council that was formed in 2015, to focus on issues affecting the lesbian, gay, bisexual, and transgender communities. As of 2025, the caucus consists of 7 members, out of the council's 50 aldermen.

== History ==
The caucus was formed by five openly gay or lesbian aldermen in June 2015. Upon its formation, the caucus' legislative priorities included "HIV care and prevention, homelessness, violence and workplace discrimination against transgender people." Following the 2023 election, the caucus grew to 9 members.

== Membership ==
=== Current members ===
The following table lists current aldermen who are members of the LGBT Caucus, as of April 2025.

Member	Ward	Joined	Role
Lamont Robinson	4	2023	Chair
Jessie Fuentes	26	2023	Vice Chair
Raymond Lopez	15	2015	Founding Member
Rossana Rodriguez-Sanchez	33	2023	
Anthony Quezada	35	2025	
Timmy Knudsen	43	2022	
Bennett Lawson	44	2023	
Leni Manaa-Hoppenworth	48	2023	
Maria Hadden	49	2019	

=== Past members ===
Member	Ward	Joined	Left
Deb Mell	33	2015	2019; lost re-election
Tom Tunney	44	2015	2023; did not run for re-election
James Cappleman	46	2015	2023; did not run for re-election
Carlos Ramirez-Rosa	35	2015	2025; resigned after appointment as Park District CEO

== See also ==
- Chicago Aldermanic Black Caucus
- Chicago City Council Democratic Socialist Caucus
- Chicago City Council Latino Caucus
- Chicago City Council Progressive Reform Caucus
