= Chicago City Council Progressive Reform Caucus =

Issue-based group of legislators

Progressive Reform Caucus
- Co-Chair: Maria Hadden
- Co-Chair: Andre Vasquez
- Secretary: Matthew Martin
- Treasurer: Jeylú Gutiérrez
- Whip: Michael Rodriguez
- Founded: 2013; 13 years ago
- Ideology: Progressivism; Democratic socialism; Social democracy
- Political position: Center-left to left-wing
- Seats in Chicago City Council: 19 / 50

The Progressive Reform Caucus of the Chicago City Council is a bloc of aldermen in the Chicago City Council that was formed in 2013. Its stated mission statement is "creating a more just and equal Chicago, combating all forms of discrimination, and advancing public policies that offer genuine opportunity to all Chicagoans, especially those who have been left out of our society’s prosperity." As of the 2023–27 term, it had 19 members, out of the council's 50 aldermen.

== History ==
The caucus was founded by nine aldermen in 2013, after having informally collaborated since 2012. There had been a "loose amalgamation of self-described progressives" in the council prior to this, but it had not been a formalized organization. Members of the caucus had historically been less aligned with Mayor Rahm Emanuel than average aldermen. The day after the formation of the Progressive Reform Caucus, a group of other aldermen who self-identified as progressives formed the Paul Douglas Alliance, with the goal of working in a more aligned fashion with Mayor Emanuel.

After the 2019 Chicago aldermanic election, several new aldermen who had campaigned as progressives joined the caucus, growing its size from 12 to 18.

The caucus has formed a political action committee (PAC) with the same name. As of June 2020, the largest donors to the PAC were labor unions: SEIU Illinois Council, AFSCME Illinois Council No. 31, and Chicago Teachers Union.

Previous chairs of the caucus have been Scott Waguespack (2015–19), Susan Sadlowski Garza (2019–21), Sophia King (2021–23). The current co-chairs are Maria Hadden and Andre Vasquez (2023–Present).

== Membership ==
=== Members during current term ===
The following table lists aldermen who are affiliated with the Progressive Reform Caucus, as of the 2023–27 term, according to news media reporting.

Member	Ward	Joined
Daniel La Spata	1	2019
Lamont Robinson	4	2023
Desmon Yancy	5	2023
William Hall	6	2023
Julia Ramirez	12	2023
Jeylú Gutiérrez	14	2023
Jeanette Taylor	20	2019
Ronnie Mosley	21	2023
Michael Rodriguez	22	2019
Byron Sigcho-Lopez	25	2019
Jessie Fuentes	26	2023
Ruth Cruz	30	2023
Rossana Rodriguez-Sanchez	33	2019
Anthony Quezada	35	2025
Andre Vasquez	40	2019
Angela Clay	46	2023
Matt Martin	47	2019
Leni Manaa-Hoppenworth	48	2023
Maria Hadden	49	2019

=== Past members ===
Member	Ward	Joined	Left
Sophia King	4	2016	2023; term ended
Leslie Hairston	5	2013	2023; term ended
Roderick Sawyer	6	2013	2023; term ended
Susan Sadlowski Garza	10	2015	2023; term ended
Stephanie Coleman	16	2019	2023; did not rejoin caucus
David Moore	17	2015	2023; did not rejoin caucus
Chris Taliaferro	29	2015	2023; did not rejoin caucus
Felix Cardona Jr.	31	2019	2023; did not rejoin caucus
Scott Waguespack	32	2013	2023; did not rejoin caucus
Toni Foulkes	16	2013	2019; lost re-election
John Arena	45	2013	2019; lost re-election
Ricardo Muñoz	22	2013	2019; removed after alleged unauthorized use of caucus PAC funds
Ameya Pawar	47	2013	2014
Nicholas Sposato	36; 38	2013	2016; left due to health issues and ideological disagreements
Bob Fioretti	2	2013	2015; term ended

=== Number of seats by term ===
Term	Size at term start	Size at term end
2013-15 (Note: Term began in 2011, but the Caucus was formed in 2013.)	9	8
2015-19	11	10
2019-23	18	
2023-27	19	

== Agenda and actions ==
=== 2019–23 City Council term ===
In August 2019, ten members of the caucus urged Mayor Lori Lightfoot to address the city's budget deficit by enacting a financial transaction tax or corporate head tax, rather than increasing property taxes or making cuts to city services. A month later, they outlined the specifics of their proposal, further suggesting a tax on office leases, a hotel tax increase, a tax on vacant commercial properties, and a local income tax on those making over $100,000 a year. Furthermore, they proposed a moratorium on the Chicago Police Department budget, a moratorium on privatization of city services, an end to Tax increment financing subsidies in wealthy neighborhoods, and increased spending on affordable housing, mental health, early childhood education, and a youth jobs program. The aldermen suggested that the Progressive Caucus could act as a bloc on these issues in the upcoming budget debate.

In November 2019, in response to Mayor Lightfoot's plan for raising the minimum wage to $15 an hour by 2021, the Progressive Caucus pushed to eliminate the tipped minimum wage and allow restaurant workers and others in this category to earn the $15 minimum wage. Later that month, half of the caucus' members (La Spata, Taylor, Rodriguez, Sigcho-Lopez, Rodriguez Sanchez, Ramirez Rosa, Vasquez, Martin, and Hadden) voted against Mayor Lightfoot's proposed annual budget for 2020, which passed by a vote of 39–11.

During the COVID-19 pandemic, members of the Progressive Caucus conducted telephone check-ins with senior citizens living in their wards.

During the George Floyd protests in late May and early June 2020, the Progressive Caucus renewed calls for the city to negotiate a new contract with the Chicago Police Department that would include systematic reforms, and introduced a resolution to that effect. In July 2020, the Caucus called for an end to the $33 million contract for police officers to be present in Chicago Public Schools, and for a reinvestment of those funds in alternative strategies for school safety. Later that month, the Caucus criticized the Chicago Police Department for its actions during a July 17 protest in Grant Park and called on the Chicago Park District to remove the park's statue of Christopher Columbus.

== See also ==
- Chicago Aldermanic Black Caucus
- Chicago City Council Democratic Socialist Caucus
- Chicago City Council Latino Caucus
- Chicago City Council LGBT Caucus
