= Sophia King =

American politician (born 1966)

- King in 2023

Member of the Chicago City Council from the 4th ward
- In office April 13, 2016 – May 15, 2023
- Preceded by: William D. Burns
- Succeeded by: Lamont Robinson

Personal details
- Born: February 14, 1966 (age 60) Colorado, U.S.
- Party: Democratic
- Spouse: Alan King
- Education: University of Illinois, Urbana-Champaign (BA); Northwestern University (MEd)

Sophia D. King (born February 14, 1966) is an American politician and former member of Chicago City Council, who served as alderman from the 4th ward, which includes portions of the neighborhoods Bronzeville, Hyde Park, Kenwood, Oakland, and South Loop. King was appointed to the position by mayor Rahm Emanuel in 2016 as a replacement to the retiring William D. Burns. She won a special election in 2017 to serve out the rest term of the Burns' unexpired term, and was re-elected to a full term in 2019. On the council, she was a member and chair of the Progressive Reform Caucus. She forwent reelection to the city council in 2023 in order to make an unsuccessful run for mayor of Chicago in the 2023 Chicago mayoral election.

== Early life and education ==
King was born in Colorado. She grew up in Evanston, Illinois, where her family moved after her mother was accepted to attend university at Northwestern. During her childhood, King spent many of her summers in Jackson, Mississippi. King's extended family had lived in the Mississippi Delta.

King earned a bachelor's degree in chemistry from the University of Illinois at Urbana-Champaign and a master's degree in education and social policy from Northwestern University. In the late 1980s, King moved to a house she built with her husband, Alan, in the Kenwood neighborhood. Her husband studied for the bar with Michelle Obama and they are friends of the Obama family.

== Professional career ==
King worked as a chemistry teacher at the Latin School of Chicago. Between 1996 and 2003, King owned the Brush Streaks pottery bar, a small business that was located on 53rd Street in Chicago.

In 1996, King co-founded to establish Ariel Community Academy with Ariel Investments C.E.O. Mellody Hobson. The K-8 school serves North Kenwood and Oakland neighborhood youth, aiming to provide them with an education similar to that offered at the Latin School of Chicago.

King was involved in 2007–2008 with Barack Obama's presidential primary campaign and general election campaign.

King founded Harriett's Daughters, a nonprofit dedicated to employment and wealth creation opportunities for African-American neighborhoods. Prior to her appointment to city council, King was the president of the organization. King also formerly served as president of the Kenwood Advisory Council, and as vice chair of the Chicago chapter of Planned Parenthood King was also a member of the It's Time Organization anti-gun violence group.

== Chicago City Council (2016–2023) ==
=== Appointment and elections ===
In April 2016, King was appointed by Mayor Rahm Emanuel to replace outgoing 4th ward alderman Will Burns, who had resigned to become Vice President of Governmental Affairs with AirBnB. King was sworn in to the City Council on April 13, 2016.

King's seat represented one of the financially wealthy and most ethnically diverse wards in the city. It represented areas along the southern lakefront between downtown Chicago and Hyde Park. Laura Washington of the Chicago Tribune described the ward's residents as including, "academic and professional elites, working-class families and a bounty of reliably voting senior citizens." Neighborhoods in the ward included Bronzeville, Hyde Park, Oakland, Kenwood, and parts of the South Loop. King had been a 4th ward resident since the 1980s.

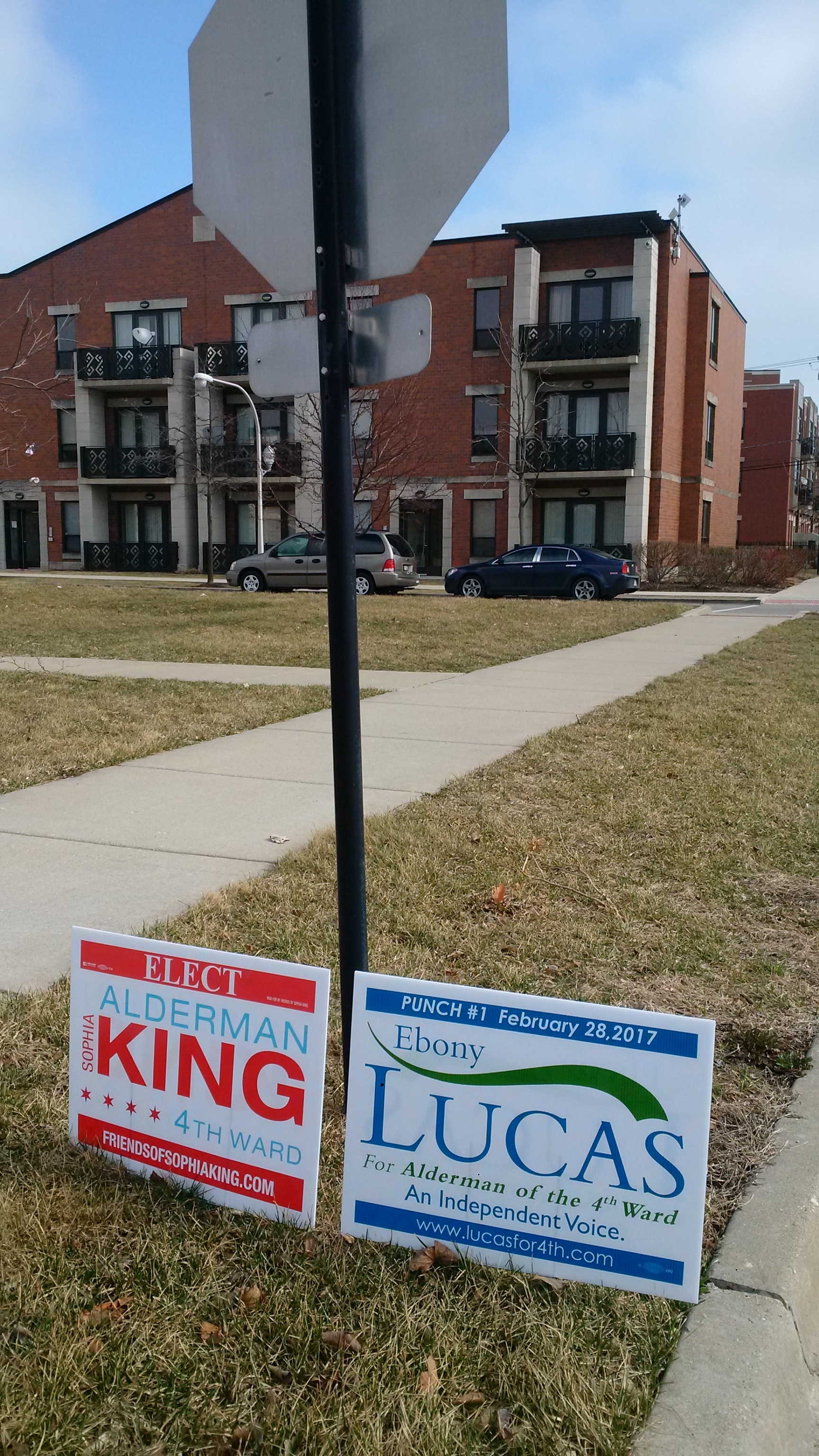
Campaign signs of the 2017 aldermanic special election

In anticipation of running for the seat in the 2017 special election, King created a political committee on March 9, 2016. King was appointed from a field of three finalists and eighteen initial applicants. She won outright election in a 2017 special election, receiving nearly 64% of the vote against four opponents. She had run with the endorsement by President Barack Obama, with whom she has long been friends. Obama had lived in the 4th Ward when he was a Chicago resident. Also endorsing King was County Board President Toni Preckwinkle, who had formerly represented the 4th district on the council. Another high-profile endorsement came from Jesse Jackson, whose Rainbow/PUSH organization was headquartered within the ward's boundaries.

In her 2019 reelection, King again received the endorsements of Obama and Preckwinkle. In the coinciding 2019 Chicago mayoral election, King endorsed Toni Preckwinkle. She declared her support for Preckwinkle upon Preckwinkle's entrance into the mayoral race, which Preckwinkle ultimately lost. However, King herself was handily reelected, receiving more than 66% of the vote against real estate attorney Ebony Lucas, who had also been one of the candidates she had faced in 2017.

=== Committee assignments ===
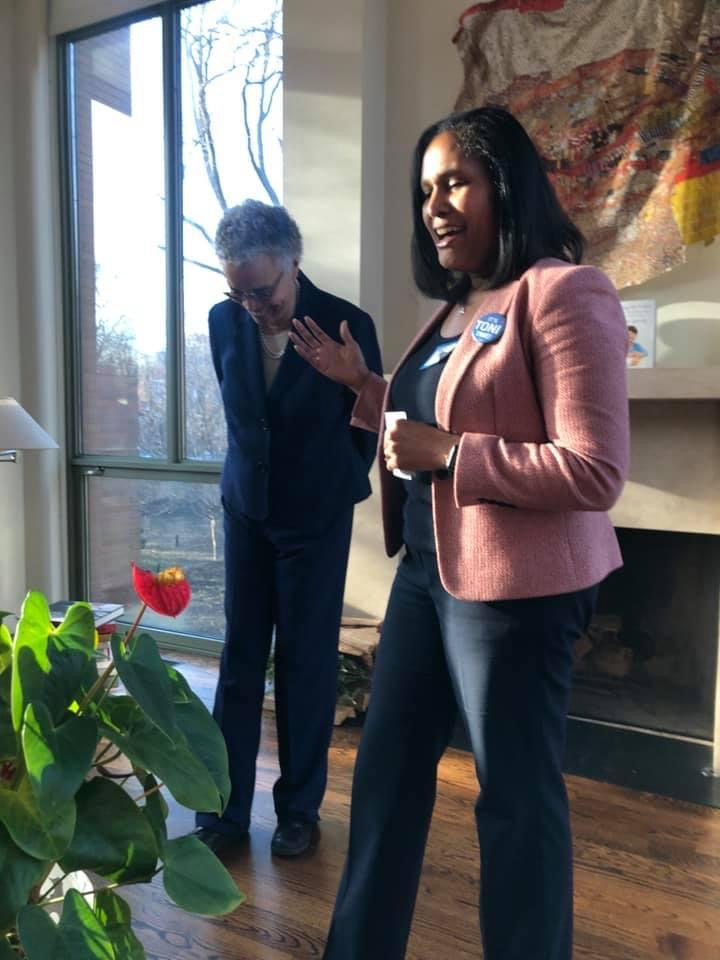
King (right) speaking at a 2022 event with Toni Preckwinkle

King was a member of the committees on Rules and Ethics, Health and Environmental Protection, Housing and Real Estate, Pedestrian and Traffic Safety, Transportation and Public Way and Workforce Development and Audit. She was the chair of the Chicago City Council Progressive Reform Caucus.

=== Relationship with mayors ===
King's tenure overlapped with the mayoralties of Rahm Emanuel and Lori Lightfoot.

Mayor Emanuel appointed King to the city council. In 2017, King's husband was fined by the Chicago Board of Ethics for illegally lobbying Mayor Emanuel without first registering as a lobbyist. King criticized the board, accusing them of failing to follow the "spirit or the letter of the law" in fining her husband. King's husband challenged the matter, and the board ultimately agreed to drop the fine on the condition that King would not commit any further lobbying violations over the next year.

In 2019, Lori Lightfoot was elected in a runoff against King's endorsed candidate, Toni Preckwinkle. During Lightfoot's mayoralty, King collaborated with her on certain issues and was at odds with her on others. King and Lightfoot's relationship was said to have soured in 2021 over policy disagreements, including King's proposed restriction on home museums. King also was at odds with Lightfoot over the city's acquisition of Mercy Hospital and Medical Center. King argued that Lightfoot had acted beyond her authority in the matter, while Lightfoot accused King not supporting the continued operation of the hospital.

=== Minimum wage increase ===
King supported the push for a $15 minimum wage. In June 2019, King introduced the "Raise Chicago" ordinance to the council, which would have increased minimum wage in Chicago to $14 after July 2020 and then $15 after July 2021. The Chicago City Council's Progressive Reform Caucus endorsed the ordinance. Mayor Lightfoot herself had previously voiced her support for a $15 minimum wage in Chicago, but did not support King's ordinance as it had been introduced. Aspects of a minimum wage increase were thereafter discussed and negotiated for months before the adoption of an increase ordinance on November 26.

King's original plan eliminated sub-minimum wages for tipped workers. That aspect was met successful opposition from Mayor Lightfoot and the Illinois Restaurant Association. Lightfoot argued that quickly increasing the wages of tipped workers to a minimum of $15 would place be too burdensome a change for businesses, especially small restaurants. Lightfoot, on November 14, 2019, released her own compromise proposal of a minimum wage increase. This proposal entitled tipped workers to a minimum wage that would be 60% that of guaranteed to all other workers. The Progressive Reform Caucus criticized this as being insufficient.

A compromise minimum wage ordinance was adopted by the council on November 26 by a 39-11 vote with King's support. For those employing more that thirteen workers, it increased the minimum wage for most employees (except tipped employees) from the existing $13 to $14 beginning in July 2020 and $15 beginning in July 2021. Every subsequent July 1, there will be an increase in proportion to increase of the Consumer Price Index (CPI). For employers whose number of employees ranges from 14 to 20, the minimum wage for most employees (except tipped employees) was increased from the existing $13 to $13.50 beginning in July 2020, $14.00 beginning in July 2021, $14.50 beginning in July 2022, and $15 beginning in July 2023, with increases every subsequent July 1 in proportion to any increase in the CPI.

=== Historic preservation matters ===
King advanced the successful local landmarking of the former Michigan Avenue headquarters of Ebony and Jet magazines. She submitted an emergency request to advance the nomination. The building was landmarked by the end of 2017.

In 2021, King proposed imposing outright ban on historic house museums in locations where zoning only allows for detached houses on individual land lots and imposing the requirement of special permission from either the Zoning Board of Appeals of City council for such museums in other areas where the majority of residences are single-family residences. King's proposal was met with vocal opposition. Mayor Lightfoot criticized the proposal, opining, "it is an overreach for what the narrow issue is that [King] has identified."

King revised her efforts in regards to historic house museums, shifting to championing and introducing to the council a revised proposal put forth by the Department of Planning and Development which did not include a ban, instead creating a requirement that such museums receive special permission in order to establish themselves in residential areas. Opposition continued. WTTW News described the proposal as being met with, "fierce opposition from cultural and preservation groups". Those that were working to create such museums at the former residences of Emmett Till and Muddy Waters raised concern that such a proposal might imperil their efforts. On March 22, 2021, Mayor Lightfoot berated the proposal as being, "highly problematic." The next day, King withdrew the proposal. The editorial board of the Chicago Sun Times celebrated its withdrawal, criticizing the proposal as, "a solution in search of a problem."

=== Policing and public safety ===
King was involved in the creation of the Civilian Office of Police Accountability. King introduced an ordinance increasing the number of days organizers need to give for special events to 20 days. In February 2022, the council unanimously adopted the ordinance. King co-sponsored the Anjanette Young Ordinance, which prohibits the Chicago Police Department from executing no-knock warrants.

=== Zoning and development ===
King was supportive of retaining the practice of aldermanic prerogative, an unwritten practice on the council that gave aldermen final approval over zoning and development within their own ward. King also called for more equity in community development.

King opposed the prospect of the site of the former Michael Reese Hospital becoming location of the casino that Chicago had been given a state license to have operate within its borders. King made it known that she more broadly opposed the opening of a casino in Bronzeville or any other parts of the 4th ward. King was made to recuse herself on the vote approving construct ion of a casino by Bally's Corporation in the River West neighborhood due to the legal work that her husband's law firm had done for Bally's.

=== Universal basic income ===
In 2021, King partnered with alderman Gilbert Villegas and Maria Hadden to co-sponsor a non-binding resolution calling for the city to create a $30 million pilot program on universal basic income. The non-binding resolution advanced through committee review, and was passed by the council in March by a vote of 30–18. The following year, Mayor Lightfoot launched the $31.5 million "Resilient Communities" universal basic income pilot program.

=== Bring Chicago Home ===
King co-sponsored the "Bring Chicago Home" ordinance, which proposed raising money to combat homelessness by increasing the real estate transfer tax for property transactions exceeding $1 million. Efforts to ratify the "Bring Chicago Home" proposal progressed further after she left the city council, resulting in a ballot referendum, which voters rejected.

=== Other policies and ordinances ===
King was involved with the successful push to rename Congress Parkway for Ida B. Wells. She was also involved in the successful push to rename Lake Shore Drive for Jean Baptiste Point du Sable.

King prevented a car sharing pilot program by the company Car2go from operating in her ward, citing concerns about the ward's street parking capacity.

== 2023 mayoral campaign ==
King (second from left) answering a question during a mayoral forum at UIC, sitting beside opponents Kam Buckner, Paul Vallas, Lori Lightfoot, Chuy Garcia

In August 2022, King announced that she would be running in the 2023 Chicago mayoral election, providing incumbent mayor Lori Lightfoot with a female challenger in a race that had previously seen only male challengers. Lightfoot was the city's second female mayor. As a result of her campaign for mayor, King did not seek reelection to the City Council.

As a mayoral candidate, King proposed expanding the size of the Chicago police force by filling 1,600 vacancies and returning 1,000 retired officers to the force to investigate non-violent crimes.

With the exception of businessman Willie Wilson, all mayoral candidates disclosed their tax returns. Of the candidates who released their tax returns, King's household income was the highest. The King's income, however, was less than what Lightfoot had been earning prior to becoming mayor.

In the initial round of the election, King was defeated, placing eighth of nine candidates with less than 7,200 votes (1.27% of the election's overall vote), a number of votes which was even less than her vote total had been in her previous 2019 aldermanic reelection.

King endorsed Paul Vallas's candidacy in the runoff election. In a rebuke of this, nine of the Progressive Reform Caucus' eighteen members signed a letter condemning Vallas and endorsing Brandon Johnson (three other members of the caucus had like King endorsed Vallas, including fellow eliminated mayoral contender Roderick Sawyer). Vallas was defeated by Johnson in the runoff. King had also endorsed Prentice Butler (her chief of staff) to be elected as her successor in the election for 4th ward alderman. Butler was defeated by state representative Lamont Robinson in a runoff election.

== Personal life ==
King has been wed to her husband, Alan King, since the 1980s. Together, they are the parents of two adult daughters. King's husband is a lawyer and a DJ in the group "Chosen Few". King herself has been the main organizer for annual summer music festivals hosted by Chosen Few.

Tax returns disclosed by King during her run for mayor showed her and her husband earning a combined adjusted gross income of $771,059 in 2021 and paying an effective tax rate of 29.6%. This was the highest income they had reported out of years between 2017 and 2021. Their 2021 income included King's $127,464 public salary and $664,879 in royalties from her husband's law firm.

== Electoral history ==
2017 Chicago City Council 4th Ward special election
| Candidate | Votes | % |
|---|---|---|
| Sophia King (incumbent) | 4,286 | 63.77 |
| Ebony Lucas | 1,179 | 17.54 |
| Gregory Livingston | 440 | 6.55 |
| Marcellus Moore Jr. | 410 | 6.10 |
| Gerald McCarthy | 406 | 6.04 |
| Total votes | 6,721 | 100 |

2019 Chicago City Council 4th Ward election
| Candidate | Votes | % |
|---|---|---|
| Sophia King (incumbent) | 9,178 | 66.1 |
| Ebony Lucas | 4,708 | 33.9 |
| Total votes | 13,886 | 100 |

2023 Chicago mayoral election
| Candidate | General election | | Runoff election | |
| Candidate | Votes | % | Votes | % |
|---|---|---|---|---|
| Brandon Johnson | 122,093 | 21.63 | 319,481 | 52.16 |
| Paul Vallas | 185,743 | 32.90 | 293,033 | 47.84 |
| Lori Lightfoot (incumbent) | 94,890 | 16.81 | | |
| Chuy García | 77,222 | 13.68 | | |
| Willie Wilson | 51,567 | 9.13 | | |
| Ja'Mal Green | 12,257 | 2.17 | | |
| Kam Buckner | 11,092 | 1.96 | | |
| Sophia King | 7,191 | 1.27 | | |
| Roderick Sawyer | 2,440 | 0.43 | | |
| Write-ins | 29 | 0.01 | | |
| Total | 564,524 | 100 | 612,514 | 100 |
