= Matt Martin (Chicago politician) =

American politician who has been the alderman of the 47th Ward of Chicago since 2019

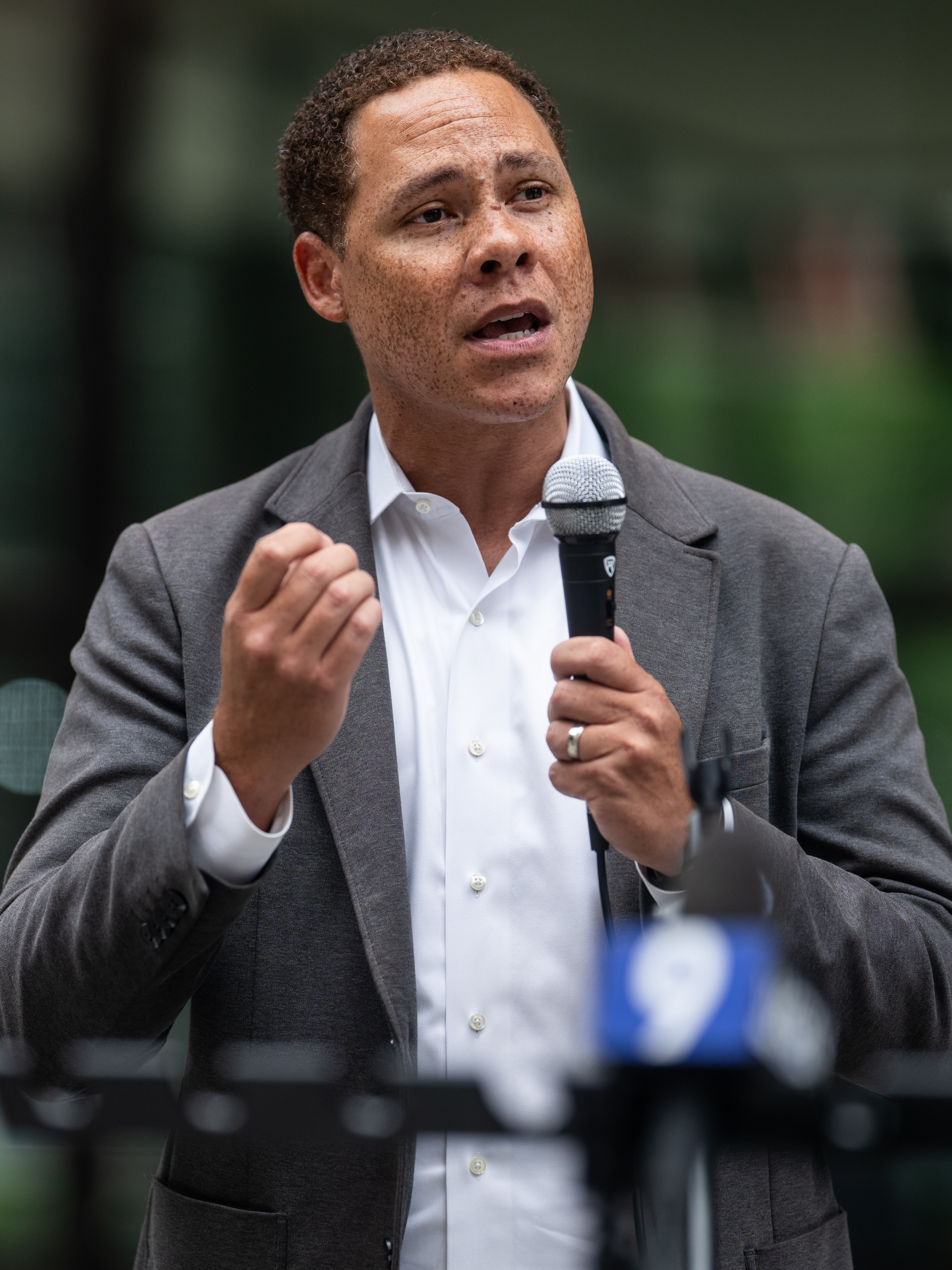

Member of the Chicago City Council from the 47th ward
- Incumbent
- Assumed office May 20, 2019
- Preceded by: Ameya Pawar

Personal details
- Born: March 5, 1984 (age 42) Arizona, U.S.
- Party: Democratic
- Education: Northwestern University (BA); Harvard University (JD)
- Website: Official website

Matt Martin (born March 5, 1984) is an American politician who is currently serving as a member of Chicago City Council for the city's 47th ward. He won election as alderman in 2019 and was re-elected in 2023. The 47th ward includes all or parts of the North Center, Lincoln Square, Lakeview, and Uptown neighborhoods.

== Early life and career ==
Matt Martin was born in Arizona and attended Northwestern University on a music scholarship, where he majored in jazz studies and political science. After graduating from Harvard Law School, Martin worked as a civil rights lawyer in the Illinois Attorney General's office, and co-founded the Heart of Lincoln Square Neighbors Association.

== 2019 aldermanic campaign ==
Matt Martin's campaign emphasized funding public schools, maintaining affordability in the ward, property tax relief for homeowners, and police accountability. He was endorsed by the Chicago Tribune which noted that Martin "has an independent streak and shares our determination that a new City Council put away its rubber stamp and flex its legislative muscle. We believe Martin can be an influential new voice on a re-energized council." In addition, he was endorsed by former Cook County Clerk David Orr and organizations such as ONE People's Campaign and United Working Families.

He finished first with 39.4% in a nine-candidate field in the election held on February 26, 2019 and then faced Michael Negron, who finished in second place with 21.4%, in a runoff election held on April 2, 2019. Following the first round election, he received a number of additional endorsements from elected officials and organizations including 49th ward alderwoman-elect Maria Hadden, 35th ward alderman Carlos Ramirez-Rosa, U.S. Representative Jan Schakowsky (D-IL), the Chicago Teachers Union, and SEIU Healthcare Illinois. On April 2, 2019, he won the runoff election with 62.6% of the vote.

On April 10, 2019, Martin joined six other newly elected members of the Chicago City Council in protesting against the approval of tax increment financing for the Lincoln Yards and The 78 real estate developments.

== Chicago City Council (2019–present) ==
=== City-wide issues ===
==== City budget ====
Martin was one of 11 aldermen who voted against Mayor Lori Lightfoot's proposed 2020 budget, alongside other members of the Progressive Caucus. In a statement, Martin said "While I commend the Mayor and her budget team for filling this year’s budget gap without layoffs or a significant property tax increase, ultimately, I saw a number of critical missed opportunities to seek more progressive sources of revenue, fund our social services in a more robust manner, and pursue structural changes that will set us on the path to solvency." Martin held multiple public events and town hall meetings about the budget before and after the vote.

=== Alliances and relationships ===
At the start of the 2019–23 term, Martin joined City Council's Progressive Caucus and Black Caucus.

== Electoral history ==
Chicago 47th ward aldermanic general election, 2019
Party	Candidate	Votes	%
Nonpartisan	Matt Martin	7,533	39.31
Nonpartisan	Michael Negron	4,087	21.38
Nonpartisan	Eileen Dordek	3,347	17.48
Nonpartisan	Jeff Jenkins	1,592	8.30
Nonpartisan	Heather Way Kitzes	921	4.82
Nonpartisan	Angie Maloney	879	4.60
Nonpartisan	Thomas Schwartzers	369	1.93
Nonpartisan	Gus Katsafaros	343	1.78
Nonpartisan	Kimball Ladien	75	0.39
Total votes		19,146	100

Chicago 47th ward aldermanic runoff election, 2019
Party	Candidate	Votes	%
Nonpartisan	Matt Martin	11,779	62.50
Nonpartisan	Michael Negron	7,053	37.50
Total votes		18,832	100.0

Chicago 47th ward aldermanic general election, 2023
Party	Candidate	Votes	%
Nonpartisan	Matt Martin (incumbent)	16,253	100
Total votes		16,253	100

== See also ==
- List of Chicago alderpersons since 1923
