= Ann Sather Restaurant =

Ann Sather
- Interactive map of Ann Sather

Restaurant information
- Established: 1945
- Owner: Tom Tunney
- Previous owner: Ann Sather
- Food type: Swedish cuisine
- Location: Chicago, Illinois, US
- Coordinates: 41°56′23.82″N 87°39′5.95″W
- Other locations: Lakeview, Chicago, Edgewater, Chicago
- Website: www.annsather.com

Ann Sather's is a Chicago restaurant with locations in Lakeview, Chicago and since 2012, a location in Edgewater, Chicago. From 1987 to 2013, there was a location in Andersonville, Chicago.

Serving Swedish cuisine, Ann Sather opened the eponymous restaurant in 1945. When Sather retired in 1981, she sold the restaurant to Tom Tunney, a 24 year old graduate of Cornell University School of Hotel Administration. Open for breakfast and lunch, they are famous for their cinnamon rolls. Jeff Mauro calls them insane. Tunney is credited with expanding the menu "to include the most famous breakfast in town." They are also known for their potato sausage and Swedish pancakes.

In 2019, Tunney made a deal with Tim Glascott for the Belmont Avenue location that will last for at least ten years, under a sale/lease back arrangement.

In 2021, they were fined $2,000 (equivalent to $2,376 in 2025) for violating indoor dining restrictions due to COVID.

== Popular culture ==
The restaurant appeared on The Best Thing I Ever Ate episode “Wake-up Call” where Ted Allen discussed the cinnamon roll.

== See also ==
- List of Michelin Bib Gourmand restaurants in the United States
