= 2023 Chicago aldermanic election =

2023 Chicago aldermanic elections
- February 28, 2023 (first round); April 4, 2023 (second round)

All 50 seats in the Chicago City Council 26 seats needed for a majority
- Turnout: 35.85% (first round)

The 2023 Chicago aldermanic election took place in two rounds on February 28 and April 4, 2023, to elect 50 alderpersons to the Chicago City Council. Each alderperson represents one of Chicago's 50 wards. The elections are non-partisan and use a two-round system where the top two finishers compete in a second-round runoff if no candidate receives more than 50% of the vote in the first round. The elections are part of the 2023 Chicago elections, which include elections for Mayor, City Clerk, and City Treasurer.

Sixteen seats changed hands since the previous election, as 12 alderpersons did not run for re-election and 4 additional members resigned during their terms. Media commentators and analysts have noted this unusually high number of retirements, comparing it to the broader "Great Resignation" phenomenon in the United States workforce.

In the first round, candidates in 36 wards won outright majorities while elections in 14 wards proceeded to a runoff election. One incumbent lost in the first round and five others were forced into a runoff, where all five won. Elected alderpersons took office on May 15, 2023, including a record number of women and LGBT alderpersons. While the elections are non-partisan, 6 candidates endorsed by the Chicago Democratic Socialists of America were re-elected or elected for the first time.

== Background ==
=== Redistricting ===
In 2021, the City Council began debate over new ward map boundaries as part of the redistricting process following the 2020 United States census. The proposed map needed be approved by 41 aldermen before May 19, 2022, otherwise proposed maps would have been submitted to voters as a referendum in the June 2022 election.

Members of the City Council fractured in support for two competing maps: one proposed by the Rules Committee and supported by the Black Caucus and one called the "Coalition Map" supported by the Latino Caucus. The former map proposed 16 majority-Black wards and 14 majority-Latino wards while the latter map proposed 16 majority-Black wards and 15 majority-Latino wards. Later versions of both maps proposed the first ever majority-Asian American ward. A resident group called Chicago Advisory Redistricting Commission also proposed its own map, but it did not receive support from any member of the council. After months of debate, Rules Committee chair Michelle Harris announced on May 9, 2022, that a tentative deal had been reached with the support of 41 aldermen that would create 16 Black-majority wards, 14 Latino-majority wards, and one Asian American-majority ward. The map was approved in a 43–7 vote on May 16, 2022.

== Overview ==
=== Retiring incumbents ===
Ward	Incumbent	Status	Member-elect	Ref
4	Sophia King	Retired to run for mayor	Lamont Robinson	
5	Leslie Hairston	Retired	Desmon Yancy	
6	Roderick Sawyer	Retired to run for mayor	William Hall	
10	Susan Sadlowski Garza	Retired	Peter Chico	
14	Edward M. Burke	Retired	Jeylú Gutiérrez	
21	Howard Brookins	Retired	Ronnie Mosley	
26	Roberto Maldonado	Retired	Jessie Fuentes	
30	Ariel Reboyras	Retired	Ruth Cruz	
34	Carrie Austin	Retired	Bill Conway	
44	Tom Tunney	Retired	Bennett Lawson	
46	James Cappleman	Retired	Angela Clay	
48	Harry Osterman	Retired	Leni Manaa-Hoppenworth	

Ray Lopez (15th ward) initially launched a campaign for mayor in May 2022, but dropped out and opted to run for re-election to City Council in November.

=== Incumbents replaced since previous election ===
Ward	Elected in 2019	Reason for departure	Appointed replacement	Member-elect	Ref
11	Patrick Daley Thompson	Ineligible due to felony conviction	Nicole Lee	Nicole Lee (inc.)	
12	George Cardenas	Resigned (elected to Board of Review)	Anabel Abarca	Julia Ramirez	
24	Michael Scott Jr.	Resigned	Monique Scott	Monique Scott (inc.)	
43	Michele Smith	Resigned	Timmy Knudsen	Timmy Knudsen (inc.)	

=== Campaign calendar ===
Candidates are required to submit a petition with 473 signatures from registered voters in their ward in order to appear on the ballot. Petitions can be circulated starting on August 30, 2022, and must be filed by November 28, 2022.

== Wards 1-25 ==
=== Ward 1 ===
==== Candidates ====
Certified candidates
Candidate	Experience	Campaign	Ref
Daniel La Spata	Incumbent (elected 2019)		
Proco Joe Moreno	Former 1st ward alderperson		
Sam Royko	Lawyer and activist		
Stephen "Andy" Schneider	President of Logan Square Preservation		

==== Endorsements ====
Daniel La Spata (incumbent)

Labor unions

- American Federation of Teachers local 1600
- Chicago Federation of Labor
- Chicago Teachers Union
- Service Employees International Union local 73

Organizations

- Chicago Democratic Socialists of America
- Sierra Club Illinois chapter PAC
- United Working Families
- Humane Society Legislative Fund
Proco Joe Moreno

Local officials

- Tom Tunney, Vice Mayor of Chicago (2019–present) and Alderperson from the 44th ward (2003–present)
Sam Royko

U.S. Representatives

- Mike Quigley, U.S. Representative from IL-05 (2009–present)
Andy Schneider

Newspapers

- Chicago Tribune

==== Results ====
1st Ward General election
Party	Candidate	Votes	%
Nonpartisan	Daniel La Spata (incumbent)	7,339	50.1
Nonpartisan	Sam Royko	3,432	23.4
Nonpartisan	Andy Schneider	2,877	19.6
Nonpartisan	Proco Joe Moreno	999	6.8
Total votes		14,647	100.0

=== Ward 2 ===
==== Candidates ====
Incumbent alderperson Brian K. Hopkins (elected 2015) ran uncontested.

==== Endorsements ====
Brian K. Hopkins (incumbent)

Labor unions

- Chicago Federation of Labor
- Humane Society Legislative Fund

==== Results ====
2nd Ward General election
Party	Candidate	Votes	%
Nonpartisan	Brian K. Hopkins (incumbent)	11,200	100.0
Total votes		11,200	100.0

=== Ward 3 ===
==== Candidates ====
Incumbent alderperson Pat Dowell (elected 2007) ran uncontested. Three candidates (Don Davis, Alan Sargon "Al" Rasho, and Jasmine Roberson) filed petitions but were removed from the ballot due to insufficient valid signatures.

==== Endorsements ====
Pat Dowell (incumbent)

Elected officials

- J. B. Pritzker, Governor of Illinois (2019–present)

Labor unions

- Chicago Federation of Labor
- Service Employees International Union local 73

==== Results ====
3rd Ward General election
Party	Candidate	Votes	%
Nonpartisan	Pat Dowell (incumbent)	9,556	100.0
Total votes		9,556	100.0

=== Ward 4 ===
==== Candidates ====
Certified candidates
Candidate	Experience	Campaign	Ref
Tracey Y. Bey	Candidate for 4th ward alderperson in 2015		
Prentice Butler	Chief of staff to incumbent Ald. Sophia King		
Matthew "Khari" Humphries	Former senior director of Youth Policy for City of Chicago; Former director of the Boys and Girls Club of Chicago		
Ebony Lucas	Real estate attorney Former candidate for 4th ward alderperson in 2017 and 2019		
Lamont Robinson	Member of the Illinois House of Representatives		
Helen West	Retired educator		

The following candidate filed petitions but was removed from the ballot due to insufficient valid signatures:

- Paul Pearson

==== Endorsements ====
Prentice Butler

Local officials

- Sophia King, Alderperson from the 4th ward (2016–present) and candidate for Mayor of Chicago in 2023
Matthew "Khari" Humphries

Labor unions

- American Federation of Teachers local 1600
- Chicago Teachers Union

Organizations

- United Working Families
Lamont Robinson

State officials

- J. B. Pritzker, Governor of Illinois (2019–present)

State legislators

- Chris Welch, Speaker of the Illinois House of Representatives (2021–present), member of the Illinois House of Representatives from the 7th district (2013–present)

County officials

- Toni Preckwinkle, President of the Cook County Board of Commissioners (2010–present); Chair of the Cook County Democratic Party (2018–present)

Labor Unions

- Chicago Federation of Labor
- Service Employees International Union local 73

==== Results ====
General election

4th Ward General election
Party	Candidate	Votes	%
Nonpartisan	Lamont Robinson	5,789	46.3
Nonpartisan	Prentice Butler	1,906	15.2
Nonpartisan	Ebony Lucas	1,802	14.4
Nonpartisan	Khari Humphries	1,175	9.4
Nonpartisan	Tracey Bey	1,145	9.2
Nonpartisan	Helen West	692	5.5
Total votes		12,509	100.0

Runoff

4th Ward Runoff election
Party	Candidate	Votes	%
Nonpartisan	Lamont Robinson	8,861	66.32%
Nonpartisan	Prentice C. Butler	4,499	33.68%
Total votes		13,360	100%

=== Ward 5 ===
==== Candidates ====
Certified candidates
Candidate	Experience	Campaign	Ref
Marlene Fisher	Senior PeopleSoft Security Administrator at University of Chicago; Community organizer		
Wallace E. Goode Jr.	Former director of the Hyde Park Chamber of Commerce		
Joshua Gray	Political consultant and entrepreneur Campaign manager for Amara Enyia in 2019 mayoral election		
Jocelyn Hare	Policy lab director at University of Chicago; Candidate for 5th ward alderperson in 2015		
Martina "Tina" Hone	Chief Engagement Officer for office of Mayor Lori Lightfoot		
Kris Levy			
Robert Palmer	High school teacher Candidate for U.S. Representative in 2020		
Dialka "Dee" Perkins	Professional boxer		
Gabriel Piemonte	Former writer and editor for Hyde Park Herald; Community organizer		
Renita Q. Ward	Attorney and former judicial clerk		
Desmon C. Yancy	Labor and community organizer Leader in Grassroots Association for Police Accountability campaign		

The following candidate filed petitions but was removed from the ballot due to insufficient valid signatures:

- Adrienne Irmer

==== Endorsements ====
Adrienne Irmer (disqualified)

U.S. Senators

- Carol Moseley Braun, U.S. Senator from Illinois (1993–1999); candidate for President in 2004

State legislators

- Monica Faith Stewart, Illinois state representative (1981–1983); candidate for U.S. Representative from IL-02 in 1982

Organizations

- Run for Something
Desmon Yancy

Local officials

- Leslie Hairston, Alderperson from the 5th ward (1999–present)

Labor unions

- American Federation of Teachers local 1600
- Chicago Federation of Labor
- Chicago Teachers Union
- Service Employees International Union local 73

Organizations

- United Working Families
- JCUA Votes
- Sierra Club Illinois chapter PAC

==== Results ====
General election

5th Ward General election
Party	Candidate	Votes	%
Nonpartisan	Desmon Yancy	2,772	26.0
Nonpartisan	Tina Hone	1,983	18.6
Nonpartisan	Renita Ward	1,266	11.9
Nonpartisan	Wallace Goode Jr.	1,118	10.5
Nonpartisan	Jocelyn Hare	927	8.7
Nonpartisan	Joshua Gray	690	6.5
Nonpartisan	Kris Levy	488	4.6
Nonpartisan	Gabriel Piemonte	438	4.1
Nonpartisan	Dee Perkins	399	3.7
Nonpartisan	Marlene Fisher	397	3.7
Nonpartisan	Robert Palmer	197	1.8
Nonpartisan	William Calloway (write-in)	1	0.0
Total votes		10,675	100.0

Runoff

5th Ward Runoff election
Party	Candidate	Votes	%
Nonpartisan	Desmon C. Yancy	6,184	51.78%
Nonpartisan	Martina 'Tina' Hone	5,758	48.22%
Total votes		11,942	100%

=== Ward 6 ===
==== Candidates ====
Certified candidates
Candidate	Experience	Campaign	Ref
Sylvester E. Baker Jr.	Candidate for Cook County Sheriff in 2014		
Kirby Birgans	Teacher; Candidate for US House of Representatives in 2022		
Tavares Briggs	School administrator		
O. Patrick Brutus	City planner at Department of Planning and Development		
Paul C. Bryson Sr.	Aldermanic assistant and former campaign manager for incumbent Ald. Roderick Sawyer; Former ward superintendent of streets and sanitation		
Barbara Ann Bunville	Police officer and therapist		
Kimberly I. "Kim" Egonmwan	Attorney and radio host		
William E. Hall	Senior pastor of St. James Community Church; Community organizer and former field director for Rainbow/PUSH coalition		
Aja Kearney	District director for State Rep. Marcus C. Evans Jr.		
Sharon E. Pincham	Rehabilitation counselor Former constituent services coordinator for State Rep. Elgie Sims		
Richard A Wooten	Former police officer Candidate for 6th ward alderperson in 2019		

The following candidates filed petitions but were removed from the ballot due to insufficient valid signatures:

- Curtiss S. Llong Bey
- Steven Dejoie

==== Endorsements ====
Barbara Ann Bunville

Organizations

- Chicago Fraternal Order of Police
William Hall

State officials

- J. B. Pritzker, Governor of Illinois (2019–present)

Labor unions

- American Federation of Teachers local 1600
- Chicago Federation of Labor
- Chicago Teachers Union
- Service Employees International Union local 73

Organizations

- United Working Families
Aja Kearney

State legislators

- Lakesia Collins, member of the Illinois House of Representatives from the 9th district (2020–present)
- Mary Flowers, member of the Illinois House of Representatives from the 31st district (1985–1993, 2023–present) and former member of the Illinois House of Representatives from the 21st district (1993–2003)
- Robyn Gabel, Majority Leader of the Illinois House of Representatives (2023–present) and member of the Illinois House of Representatives from the 18th district (2011–present)

==== Results ====
General election

6th Ward General election
Party	Candidate	Votes	%
Nonpartisan	William Hall	2,483	23.8
Nonpartisan	Richard Wooten	2,412	23.1
Nonpartisan	Kim Egonmwan	878	8.4
Nonpartisan	Barbara Ann Bunville	852	8.2
Nonpartisan	Sharon Pincham	841	8.1
Nonpartisan	Sylvester Baker Jr.	714	6.9
Nonpartisan	Paul Bryson Sr.	591	5.7
Nonpartisan	Aja Kearney	470	4.5
Nonpartisan	Patrick Brutus	448	4.3
Nonpartisan	Tavares Briggs	393	3.8
Nonpartisan	Kirby Birgans	342	3.3
Total votes		10,424	100.0

Runoff

6th Ward Runoff election
Party	Candidate	Votes	%
Nonpartisan	William E. Hall	6,332	58.23%
Nonpartisan	Richard A. Wooten	4,543	41.77%
Total votes		10,875	100%

=== Ward 7 ===
==== Candidates ====
Incumbent alderperson Gregory Mitchell (elected 2015) is running uncontested. Two challengers (Anthony "Tony" Blair and Jocilyn Floyd) filed petitions to run for the seat, but were removed from the ballot after due to insufficient petition signatures.

==== Endorsements ====
Gregory Mitchell (incumbent)

Labor unions

- Service Employees International Union local 73
Declined to endorse

Labor unions

- Chicago Federation of Labor

==== Results ====
7th Ward General election
Party	Candidate	Votes	%
Nonpartisan	Gregory Mitchell	7,909	98.1
Nonpartisan	Tony Blair (write-in)	154	1.9
Total votes		8,063	100.0

=== Ward 8 ===
==== Candidates ====
Certified candidates
Candidate	Experience	Campaign	Ref
Sean M. Flynn	Former chief of staff for alderman David H. Moore		
Michelle A. Harris	Incumbent (appointed 2006)		
Linda Hudson	Senior tax assistant Candidate for 8th ward alderperson in 2019		

The following candidate was removed from the ballot due to insufficient petition signatures:

- Geno Young

==== Endorsements ====
Michelle A. Harris (incumbent)

State officials

- J. B. Pritzker, Governor of Illinois

State legislators

- Elgie Sims, Illinois state senator from District 17 (2018–present)

County officials

- Stanley Moore, Cook County commissioner from District 4 (2013–present)

Local officials

- Lori Lightfoot, Mayor of Chicago (2019–present)

Labor unions

- Chicago Federation of Labor
- Service Employees International Union local 73

==== Results ====
8th Ward General election
Party	Candidate	Votes	%
Nonpartisan	Michelle A. Harris (incumbent)	8,675	70.6
Nonpartisan	Linda Hudson	2,214	18.0
Nonpartisan	Sean Flynn	1,396	11.4
Total votes		12,285	100.0

=== Ward 9 ===
==== Candidates ====
Certified candidates
Candidate	Experience	Campaign	Ref
Cameron M. Barnes	Former national youth director for Rainbow/PUSH		
Anthony Beale	Incumbent (elected 1999)		
Cleopatra Draper	Candidate for 9th ward alderperson in 2019; Radio host		

The following candidate filed petitions to appear on the ballot but withdrew prior to ballot certification:

- Sonya Thompson Dorsey

==== Endorsements ====
Anthony Beale

State officials

- J. B. Pritzker, Governor of Illinois
Cleopatra Draper

Labor unions

- American Federation of Teachers local 1600

Organizations

- United Working Families
Declined to endorse

Labor unions

- Chicago Federation of Labor

==== Results ====
9th Ward General election
Party	Candidate	Votes	%
Nonpartisan	Anthony Beale (incumbent)	6,296	60.2
Nonpartisan	Cleopatra Draper	3,339	31.9
Nonpartisan	Cameron M. Barnes	832	7.9
Total votes		10,467	100.0

=== Ward 10 ===
==== Candidates ====
Certified candidates
Candidate	Experience	Campaign	Ref
Yessenia Carreon	Local artists' advocate Former staffer for Ald. John Pope		
Peter Chico	Police officer Member of Local School Council		
Ana Guajardo	Workers' rights organizer		
Óscar Sanchez	Community organizer and environmental activist		
Jessica A. Venegas	Police officer		

==== Endorsements ====
Ana Guajardo

U.S. Representatives

- Chuy García, U.S. Representative from IL-04 (2019–present)

Labor unions

- Brotherhood of Railroad Signalmen local 183
- Chicago Federation of Labor
- International Association of Bridge, Structural, Ornamental and Reinforcing Iron Workers local 1
- International Association of Bridge, Structural, Ornamental and Reinforcing Iron Workers local 63
- International Brotherhood of Electrical Workers Illinois PAC
- International Union of Bricklayers and Allied Craftworkers administrative district council 1
- International Union of Painters and Allied Trades district council 14
- Service Employees International Union local 1
- Service Employees International Union local 73
- Service Employees International Union Illinois, Indiana, Missouri, Kansas
- United Auto Workers local 551
- United Steelworkers Organization of Active Retirees
- United Union of Roofers, Waterproofers and Allied Workers local 11
- Workers United
Óscar Sanchez

County officials

- Brandon Johnson, Cook County commissioner from District 1 (2018–present)

Labor unions

- American Federation of Teachers local 1600

Organizations

- Chicago Democratic Socialists of America
- Run for Something
- Sunrise Movement Chicago
- United Working Families

==== Results ====
General election

10th Ward General election
Party	Candidate	Votes	%
Nonpartisan	Peter Chico	3,287	40.5
Nonpartisan	Ana Guajardo	2,155	26.5
Nonpartisan	Oscar Sanchez	1,503	18.5
Nonpartisan	Jessica Venegas	912	11.2
Nonpartisan	Yessenia Carreon	263	3.2
Total votes		8,120	100.0

Runoff

10th Ward Runoff election
Party	Candidate	Votes	%
Nonpartisan	Peter Chico	5,027	58.74%
Nonpartisan	Ana Guajardo	3,531	41.26%
Total votes		8,558	100%

=== Ward 11 ===
==== Candidates ====
Certified candidates
Candidate	Experience	Campaign	Ref
Anthony Ciaravino	Police instructor		
Steven Demitro	Lawyer; Former professional hockey player		
Donald Don	Firefighter		
Elvira "Vida" Jimenez	Former city services representative		
Froyland Jimenez	Chicago Public Schools teacher		
Nicole Lee	Incumbent (appointed 2022); Former community relations executive		
Ambria Taylor	Chicago Public Schools teacher		

==== Endorsements ====
Ambria Taylor

Labor Unions

- International Association of Machinists and Aerospace Workers (IAMAW) Local Lodge 2600

Civic and Political Organizations

- 25th Ward Independent Political Organization (IPO)
- Strong Towns Chicago
- Chicago Democratic Socialists of America
Nicole Lee (incumbent)

State officials

- J. B. Pritzker, Governor of Illinois

Labor unions

- Chicago Federation of Labor
- Service Employees International Union local 73

==== Results ====
General election

11th Ward General election
Party	Candidate	Votes	%
Nonpartisan	Nicole Lee (incumbent)	3,561	30.9
Nonpartisan	Tony Ciaravino	3,384	29.4
Nonpartisan	Don Don	2,254	19.6
Nonpartisan	Ambria Taylor	1,552	13.5
Nonpartisan	Vida Jimenez	326	2.8
Nonpartisan	Froy Jimenez	275	2.4
Nonpartisan	Steve Demitro	159	1.4
Total votes		11,511	100.0

Runoff

11th Ward Runoff election
Party	Candidate	Votes	%
Nonpartisan	Nicole Lee	8,045	62.64%
Nonpartisan	Anthony "Tony" Ciaravino	4,799	37.36%
Total votes		12,844	100%

=== Ward 12 ===
==== Candidates ====
Certified candidates
Candidate	Experience	Campaign	Ref
Anabel Abarca	Incumbent (appointed 2022); Former Chief of Staff to alderman George Cardenas		
Julia Ramirez	Community organizer and nonprofit worker		

The following candidate filed petitions but was removed from the ballot due to filing an economic statement, not with Cook County:

- Joseph E. Mercado

==== Endorsements ====
Julia Ramirez

Labor unions

- American Federation of Teachers local 1600
- Service Employees International Union local 73

Organizations

- Sunrise Movement Chicago
- United Working Families
Declined to endorse

Labor unions

- Chicago Federation of Labor

==== Results ====
12th Ward General election
Party	Candidate	Votes	%
Nonpartisan	Julia Ramirez	3,355	57.0
Nonpartisan	Anabel Abarca (incumbent)	2,531	43.0
Total votes		5,886	100.0

=== Ward 13 ===
==== Candidates ====
Certified candidates
Candidate	Experience	Campaign	Ref
Paul Bruton	Former analyst at Chicago Inspector General's office		
Marty Quinn	Incumbent (elected 2011)		

==== Endorsements ====
Marty Quinn (incumbent)

Labor unions

- Chicago Federation of Labor

==== Results ====
13th Ward General election
Party	Candidate	Votes	%
Nonpartisan	Marty Quinn (incumbent)	11,300	87.6
Nonpartisan	Paul Bruton	1,598	12.4
Total votes		12,898	100%

=== Ward 14 ===
==== Candidates ====
Certified candidates
Candidate	Experience	Campaign	Ref
Jeylu B. Gutierrez	District director for county Commissioner Alma Anaya; Former counselor and community liaison for public schools		
Raul Reyes	Staff assistant at City Clerk's office Candidate for 15th ward alderperson in 2019		

==== Endorsements ====
Jeylu Gutierrez

U.S. Representatives

- Chuy García, U.S. Representative from IL-04 (2019–present)

State legislators

- Aaron Ortiz, Illinois state representative from District 1 (2019–present)

Labor unions

- Chicago Federation of Labor
- Service Employees International Union local 73

==== Results ====
14th Ward General election
Party	Candidate	Votes	%
Nonpartisan	Jeylú Gutiérrez	3,081	65.2
Nonpartisan	Raul Reyes	1,647	34.8
Total votes		4,728	100%

=== Ward 15 ===
==== Candidates ====
Certified candidates
Candidate	Experience	Campaign	Ref
Vicko Alvarez	Former union organizer		
Raymond Lopez	Incumbent (elected 2015)		
Gloria Ann Williams	Nonprofit founder Former resident service coordinator		

==== Endorsements ====
Vicko Alvarez

Labor unions

- American Federation of Teachers local 1600

Organizations

- United Working Families
Declined to endorse

Labor unions

- Chicago Federation of Labor

==== Results ====
15th Ward General election
Party	Candidate	Votes	%
Nonpartisan	Raymond Lopez (incumbent)	3,128	64.2
Nonpartisan	Victoria "Vicko" Alvarez	1,178	24.2
Nonpartisan	Gloria Ann Williams	567	11.6
Total votes		4,873	100.0

=== Ward 16 ===
==== Candidates ====
Certified candidates
Candidate	Experience	Campaign	Ref
Stephanie Coleman	Incumbent (elected 2019)		
Carolynn Denise Crump	Police officer Candidate for state representative in 2022		
Eddie Johnson III	Nonprofit executive Candidate for 16th ward alderperson in 2019		

The following candidate filed petitions but was removed from the ballot due to insufficient signatures:

- Otis Woods

==== Endorsements ====
Stephanie Coleman (incumbent)

State officials

- J. B. Pritzker, Governor of Illinois

Labor unions

- Chicago Federation of Labor
- Service Employees International Union local 73

==== Results ====
16th Ward General election
Party	Candidate	Votes	%
Nonpartisan	Stephanie Coleman (incumbent)	4,288	77.5
Nonpartisan	Carolynn Denise Crump	700	12.7
Nonpartisan	Eddie Johnson III	543	9.8
Total votes		5,531	100.0

=== Ward 17 ===
Incumbent alderperson David H. Moore is running uncontested.

==== Endorsements ====
David H. Moore (incumbent)

Labor unions

- Service Employees International Union local 73
Declined to endorse

Labor unions

- Chicago Federation of Labor

==== Results ====
17th Ward General election
Party	Candidate	Votes	%
Nonpartisan	David H. Moore (incumbent)	7,154	100.0
Total votes		7,154	100.0

=== Ward 18 ===
==== Candidates ====
Certified candidates
Candidate	Experience	Campaign	Ref
Derrick Curtis	Incumbent (elected 2015)		
Heather Wills	Community activist		

==== Endorsements ====
Derrick Curtis (incumbent)

Labor unions

- Chicago Federation of Labor
Heather Wills

Organizations

- Run for Something

==== Results ====
18th Ward General election
Party	Candidate	Votes	%
Nonpartisan	Derrick Curtis (incumbent)	7,275	61.1
Nonpartisan	Heather Wills	4,627	38.9
Total votes		11,902	100.0

=== Ward 19 ===
==== Candidates ====
Certified candidates
Candidate	Experience	Campaign	Ref
Michael T. Cummings	Retired police sergeant		
Timothy "Tim" Noonan	Independent computer consultant Founder of 19th Ward Mutual Aid organization		
Matthew O'Shea	Incumbent (elected 2011)		

==== Endorsements ====
Matthew O'Shea (incumbent)

Labor unions

- Service Employees International Union local 73
Declined to endorse

Labor unions

- Chicago Federation of Labor

==== Results ====
19th Ward General election
Party	Candidate	Votes	%
Nonpartisan	Matthew O'Shea (incumbent)	14,417	63.4
Nonpartisan	Michael Cummings	6,996	30.8
Nonpartisan	Tim Noonan	1,332	5.9
Total votes		22,745	100.0

=== Ward 20 ===
==== Candidates ====
Certified candidates
Candidate	Experience	Campaign	Ref
Jennifer O. Maddox	Community organizer and nonprofit founder Candidate for 20th ward alderperson in 2019		
Andre Smith	Pastor and entrepreneur Candidate for 20th ward alderperson in 2015 and 2019		
Jeanette Taylor	Incumbent (elected 2019)		

==== Endorsements ====
Jeanette Taylor (incumbent)

Labor unions

- American Federation of Teachers local 1600
- Chicago Federation of Labor
- Service Employees International Union local 73

Organizations

- Chicago City Council Democratic Socialist Caucus
- Chicago Democratic Socialists of America
- Sierra Club Illinois chapter PAC
- United Working Families

==== Results ====
20th Ward General election
Party	Candidate	Votes	%
Nonpartisan	Jeanette Taylor (incumbent)	3,375	52.6
Nonpartisan	Jennifer Maddox	1,706	26.6
Nonpartisan	Andre Smith	1,335	20.8
Total votes		6,416	100.0

=== Ward 21 ===
==== Candidates ====
Certified candidates
Candidate	Experience	Campaign	Ref
Preston Brown Jr.	Attorney; Democratic committeeman for the 34th ward Candidate for 34th ward alderperson in 2019		
Ayana Clark	Community liaison for U.S. Rep. Bobby Rush		
Cornell Dantzler	Former firefighter and Navy veteran		
Daliah Goree	Police officer and nonprofit founder		
Kweli Kwaza	Founder of block club network Former community liaison for Ald. Howard Brookins		
Larry Lloyd	Attorney		
Ronnie L. Mosley	Consultant and community activist		

The following candidates filed petitions but were removed from the ballot due to insufficient signatures:

- Justin Sawyer Write in candidate
- Lawaco Toe
- Patricia L. Tillman
- Bernard "BK" Kelly

The following candidates filed petitions but withdrew before ballot certification:

- Tawana J. Robinson
- Nekoiya Washington
- Aziza T. Butler

==== Endorsements ====
Ayana Clark

Organizations

- Run for Something (co-endorsement with Ronnie L. Mosley)
Kweli Kwaza

Notable individuals

- Jim Brewer, former NBA player
Ronnie L. Mosley

State officials

- J. B. Pritzker, Governor of Illinois

Local officials

- Howard Brookins, alderman for the 21st ward

Labor unions

- Chicago Federation of Labor
- Service Employees International Union local 73

Organizations

- Run for Something (co-endorsement with Ayana Clark)

==== Results ====
General election

21st Ward General election
Party	Candidate	Votes	%
Nonpartisan	Ronnie Mosley	3,268	25.0
Nonpartisan	Cornell Dantzler	2,871	21.9
Nonpartisan	Preston Brown Jr.	2,409	18.4
Nonpartisan	Daliah Goree	1,410	10.8
Nonpartisan	Kweli Kwaza	1,347	10.3
Nonpartisan	Ayana Clark	1,140	8.7
Nonpartisan	Larry Lloyd	649	5.0
Total votes		13,094	100.0

Runoff

21st Ward Runoff election
Party	Candidate	Votes	%
Nonpartisan	Ronnie L. Mosley	7,160	52.40%
Nonpartisan	Cornell Dantzler	6,503	47.60%
Total votes		13,663	100%

=== Ward 22 ===
==== Candidates ====
Certified candidates
Candidate	Experience	Campaign	Ref
Kristian Armendariz	Youth organizer		
Neftalie Gonzalez	Candidate for 22nd ward alderperson in 2011, 2015, and 2019		
Michael Rodriguez	Incumbent (elected 2019)		

==== Endorsements ====
Michael Rodriguez

State officials

- J. B. Pritzker, Governor of Illinois

==== Results ====
22nd Ward General election
Party	Candidate	Votes	%
Nonpartisan	Michael Rodriguez (incumbent)	3,070	66.3
Nonpartisan	Kristian Armendariz	834	18.0
Nonpartisan	Neftalie Gonzalez	724	15.6
Total votes		4,628	100.0

=== Ward 23 ===
==== Candidates ====
Certified candidates
Candidate	Experience	Campaign	Ref
Eddie Guillen	Business owner Former chief of staff for Angelica Guerrero-Cuellar		
Silvana Tabares	Incumbent (appointed 2018)		

==== Endorsements ====
Eddie Guillen

Labor unions

- LiUNA Chicago Laborers' District Council

==== Results ====
23rd Ward General election
Party	Candidate	Votes	%
Nonpartisan	Silvana Tabares (incumbent)	6,523	72.9
Nonpartisan	Eddie Guillen	2,419	27.1
Total votes		8,942	100.0

=== Ward 24 ===
==== Candidates ====
Certified candidates
Candidate	Experience	Campaign	Ref
Vetress M. Boyce	Candidate for 24th ward alderperson in 2015 and 2019		
Drewone Goldsmith	Former firefighter Facility director at Lawndale Christian Community Ministry		
Traci Treasure Johnson	Small business owner Candidate for 24th ward alderperson in 2019		
Larry G. Nelson	Candidate for 24th ward alderperson in 2015		
Creative Scott	Small business owner		
Monique Scott	Incumbent (appointed 2022)		
Edward Ward	Community organizer		
Luther Woodruff Jr.	Streets and Sanitation Department employee		

==== Endorsements ====
Monique L. Scott

State officials

- J. B. Pritzker, Governor of Illinois

==== Results ====
General election

24th Ward General election
Party	Candidate	Votes	%
Nonpartisan	Monique Scott (incumbent)	3,015	45.3
Nonpartisan	Creative Scott	986	14.8
Nonpartisan	Vetress M. Boyce	831	12.5
Nonpartisan	Drewone Goldsmith	457	6.9
Nonpartisan	Luther Woodruff Jr.	407	6.1
Nonpartisan	Traci Treasure Johnson	347	5.2
Nonpartisan	Larry G. Nelson	344	5.2
Nonpartisan	Edward Ward	268	4.0
Total votes		6,655	100.0

Runoff

24th Ward Runoff election
Party	Candidate	Votes	%
Nonpartisan	Monique L. Scott	4,473	66.91%
Nonpartisan	Creative Scott	2,212	33.09%
Total votes		6,685	100%

=== Ward 25 ===
==== Candidates ====
Certified candidates
Candidate	Experience	Campaign	Ref
Aida Flores	Community organizer Former Chicago Public Schools teacher and principal Candidate for 25th ward alderperson in 2019		
Byron Sigcho-Lopez	Incumbent (elected 2019)		

The following candidate was certified to appear on the ballot, but dropped out of the race and endorsed Flores:

- Daniel Montes, firefighter and paramedic

==== Endorsements ====
Aida Flores

U.S. Representatives

- Chuy García, U.S. Representative from IL-04 (2019–present)

Labor Unions

- Teamsters Joint Council 25
Byron Sigcho-Lopez

Organizations

- Chicago Democratic Socialists of America

Labor Unions

- Service Employees International Union local 73
- Humane Society Legislative Fund

==== Results ====
25th Ward General election
Party	Candidate	Votes	%
Nonpartisan	Byron Sigcho-Lopez (incumbent)	4,201	52.9
Nonpartisan	Aida Flores	3,734	47.1
Total votes		7,935	100.0

== Wards 26-50 ==
=== Ward 26 ===
==== Candidates ====
Certified candidates
Candidate	Experience	Campaign	Ref
Jessica "Jessie" Fuentes	Director of policy and youth advocacy for Puerto Rican Cultural Center		
Julian “Jumpin” Perez	DJ and producer		
Angee Gonzalez Rodriguez	Medical professional Candidate for 26th ward alderperson in 2019; 26th ward Committeeperson		

The following candidates filed petitions but were removed from the ballot due to insufficient signatures:

- Kirk J. Ortiz
- Anthony N. Rivera

The incumbent alderperson, Roberto Maldonado, initially filed petitions to run, but withdrew before ballot certification.

==== Endorsements ====
Jessie Fuentes

Local officials

- Roberto Maldonado, incumbent 26th ward alderperson

Organizations

- United Working Families

Labor unions

- American Federation of Teachers local 1600
- Chicago Federation of Labor

==== Results ====
26th Ward General election
Party	Candidate	Votes	%
Nonpartisan	Jessie Fuentes	4,990	55.6
Nonpartisan	Julian Perez	2,863	31.9
Nonpartisan	Angee Gonzalez Rodriguez	1,094	12.2
Nonpartisan	Kirk Ortiz (write-in)	32	0.4
Total votes		8,979	100.0

=== Ward 27 ===
Incumbent alderperson Walter Burnett Jr. is running for re-election uncontested.

==== Results ====
27th Ward General election
Party	Candidate	Votes	%
Nonpartisan	Walter Burnett Jr. (incumbent)	7,856	100.0
Total votes		7,856	100.0

=== Ward 28 ===
==== Candidates ====
Certified candidates
Candidate	Experience	Campaign	Ref
Jason Ervin	Incumbent (appointed 2011)		
Shawn A. Walker			

Challenger Shawn Walker was initially removed from the ballot by the Board of Elections, but reinstated onto the ballot by the Illinois Appellate Court after an appeal. Two other candidates filed nominating petitions, but one (Beverly Miles) was removed from the ballot due to insufficient signatures and another (Timothy Gladney) withdrew before ballot certification.

==== Results ====
28th Ward General election
Party	Candidate	Votes	%
Nonpartisan	Jason Ervin (incumbent)	4,702	76.8
Nonpartisan	Shawn Walker	1,423	23.2
Total votes		6,125	100.0

=== Ward 29 ===
==== Candidates ====
Certified candidates
Candidate	Experience	Campaign	Ref
Corey Dooley	Community activist		
CB Johnson	Community organizer		
Chris Taliaferro	Incumbent (elected 2015)		

The following candidate filed petitions but withdrew before ballot certification:

- Walter T. Adamczyk

==== Endorsements ====
Chris Taliaferro

State officials

- J. B. Pritzker, Governor of Illinois

==== Results ====
General election

29th Ward General election
Party	Candidate	Votes	%
Nonpartisan	Chris Taliaferro (incumbent)	4,868	49.8
Nonpartisan	CB Johnson	3,897	39.8
Nonpartisan	Corey Dooley	908	9.3
Nonpartisan	Lisa Brown Newman (write-in)	106	1.1
Nonpartisan	Walter Adamcsyk (write-in)	6	0.1
Total votes		9,785	100.0

Runoff

29th Ward Runoff election
Party	Candidate	Votes	%
Nonpartisan	Chris Taliaferro	5,526	51.43%
Nonpartisan	CB Johnson	5,218	48.57%
Total votes		10,744	100%

=== Ward 30 ===
==== Candidates ====
Certified candidates
Candidate	Experience	Campaign	Ref
Ruth Cruz	Assistant admissions director at Roosevelt University; Volunteer at Cook County restorative justice court Member of Local School Council		
Jessica Gutierrez	Former teacher Candidate for alderperson in the 2019 election		
Juanpablo Prieto	Director of diversity programs at Chicago Transit Authority		
Warren Williams	Community organizer Filmmaker		

The following candidate filed petitions but was removed from the ballot due to insufficient signatures:

- Andrew A. Cleaver

The following candidate filed petitions but withdrew before ballot certification:

- Rory McHale

==== Endorsements ====
Warren Williams

State officials

- State Senator Robert Martwick
- State Senator Robert Peters
- State Representative Will Guzzardi
- Cook County Commissioner Anthony Quezada

Organizations

- Chicago Democratic Socialists of America
- 30th United
- United Northwest Side
- The People's Lobby
- Run for Something
- Northside DFA
- Girl, I Guess
- 33rd Working Families
- Independent Voters of Illinois-IPO
- Better Streets Chicago
- CTAction
- Young Democrats of Chicago

Labor Unions

- Cook County College Teachers Union
- Illinois Nurses Association

==== Results ====
General election

30th Ward General election
Party	Candidate	Votes	%
Nonpartisan	Jessica Gutierrez	3,871	37.7
Nonpartisan	Ruth Cruz	2,766	26.9
Nonpartisan	Warren Williams	2,451	23.8
Nonpartisan	Juanpablo Prieto	1,150	11.2
Nonpartisan	Andrew Cleaver (write-in)	42	0.4
Total votes		10,238	100.0

Runoff

30th Ward Runoff election
Party	Candidate	Votes	%
Nonpartisan	Ruth Cruz	5,693	51.31%
Nonpartisan	Jessica W. Gutierrez	5,402	48.69%
Total votes		11,095	100%

=== Ward 31 ===
==== Candidates ====
Certified candidates
Candidate	Experience	Campaign	Ref
Felix Cardona Jr.	Incumbent (elected 2019)		
Esteban Burgoa Ontanon	Navy veteran Former member of Local School Councils		

The following candidate filed petitions but withdrew before ballot certification:

- Patrick J. Gibbons II

==== Results ====
31st Ward General election
Party	Candidate	Votes	%
Nonpartisan	Felix Cardona Jr. (incumbent)	5,113	81.2
Nonpartisan	Esteban Burgoa Ontanon	1,181	18.8
Total votes		6,294	100.0

=== Ward 32 ===
==== Candidates ====
Incumbent alderman Scott Waguespack (elected 2007) is running uncontested for re-election.

==== Results ====
32nd Ward General election
Party	Candidate	Votes	%
Nonpartisan	Scott Waguespack (incumbent)	12,537	100.0
Total votes		12,537	100.0

=== Ward 33 ===
==== Candidates ====
Certified candidates
Candidate	Experience	Campaign	Ref
Samie Martinez	Project coordinator for Chicago Department of Planning and Development; Former chief of staff for Ald. George Cardenas		
Rossana Rodriguez-Sanchez	Incumbent (elected 2019)		
Laith Shaaban	Former manager at banking institutions		

==== Endorsements ====
Rossana Rodriguez-Sanchez

State officials

- J. B. Pritzker, Governor of Illinois

Organizations

- United Working Families
- Chicago Democratic Socialists of America

Labor Unions

- Service Employees International Union local 73
- American Federation of Teachers local 1600
- Chicago Federation of Labor

==== Results ====
33rd Ward General election
Party	Candidate	Votes	%
Nonpartisan	Rossana Rodriguez-Sanchez (incumbent)	5,814	54.7
Nonpartisan	Samie Martinez	3,604	33.9
Nonpartisan	Laith Shaaban	1,212	11.4
Total votes		10,630	100%

=== Ward 34 ===
==== Candidates ====
Certified candidates
Candidate	Experience	Campaign	Ref
Jim Ascot	Commercial real estate broker		
Bill Conway	Former prosecutor Candidate for Cook County State's Attorney in 2020		

==== Endorsements ====
Bill Conway

State officials

- J. B. Pritzker, Governor of Illinois

==== Results ====
34th Ward General election
Party	Candidate	Votes	%
Nonpartisan	Bill Conway	5,567	66.2
Nonpartisan	Jim Ascot	2,837	33.8
Total votes		8,404	100.0

=== Ward 35 ===
==== Candidates ====
Incumbent alderperson Carlos Ramirez-Rosa (elected 2015) is running uncontested for re-election. Challenger Richard Mpistolarides filed petitions, but was removed from the ballot for allegedly circulating petitions with a false address.

==== Endorsements ====
Carlos Ramirez Rosa

State officials

- J. B. Pritzker, Governor of Illinois

Organizations

- United Working Families
- Chicago Democratic Socialists of America

Labor Unions

- Service Employees International Union local 73
- American Federation of Teachers local 1600
- Chicago Federation of Labor
- Humane Society Legislative Fund

==== Results ====
35th Ward General election
Party	Candidate	Votes	%
Nonpartisan	Carlos Ramirez-Rosa (incumbent)	9,570	100.0
Total votes		9,570	100.0

=== Ward 36 ===
==== Candidates ====
Certified candidates
Candidate	Experience	Campaign	Ref
Jacqueline "Jackie" Baez	Member of Cook County Commission on Women's Issues; Former president of Humboldt Park Advisory Council		
David Herrera	Consultant and finance professional		
Gilbert Villegas	Incumbent (elected 2015)		
Leonor "Lori" Torres Whitt	Chicago Public Schools teacher		

==== Endorsements ====
Lori Torres Whitt

Organizations

- United Working Families

Labor unions

- American Federation of Teachers local 1600

==== Results ====
General election

36th Ward General election
Party	Candidate	Votes	%
Nonpartisan	Gilbert Villegas (incumbent)	4,240	46.5
Nonpartisan	Lori Torres Whitt	2,741	30.0
Nonpartisan	David Herrera	1,466	16.1
Nonpartisan	Jackie Baez	673	7.4
Total votes		9,120	100%

Runoff

36th Ward Runoff election
Party	Candidate	Votes	%
Nonpartisan	Gilbert "Gil" Villegas	5,934	57.31%
Nonpartisan	Leonor "Lori" Torres Whitt	4,421	42.69%
Total votes		10,355	100%

=== Ward 37 ===
==== Candidates ====
Certified candidates
Candidate	Experience	Campaign	Ref
Corey Denelle Braddock	Business consultant Former police officer Member of Local School Council		
Emma Mitts	Incumbent (appointed 2000)		
Howard Ray	Civil servant and former USPS and CTA employee Former police officer		
Jake Towers	Kindergarten teacher		

==== Endorsements ====
Emma Mitts

State officials

- J. B. Pritzker, Governor of Illinois

==== Results ====
37th Ward General election
Party	Candidate	Votes	%
Nonpartisan	Emma Mitts (incumbent)	4,378	62.6
Nonpartisan	Howard Ray	1,882	26.9
Nonpartisan	Jake Towers	412	5.9
Nonpartisan	Corey Denelle Braddock	324	4.6
Total votes		6,996	100.0

=== Ward 38 ===
==== Candidates ====
Certified candidates
Candidate	Experience	Campaign	Ref
Ed Bannon	Former President of Six Corners Association		
Bruce Randazzo	Candidate for state representative in 2012; Retired city truck driver		
Franco Reyes	Software engineer manager		
Cynthia Santos	Member of Illinois Pollution Control Board; Former Metropolitan Water Reclamation District commissioner Former chief of staff for Ald. Michael Wojcik		
Nicholas Sposato	Incumbent (elected 2015)		

The following candidate filed petitions but withdrew before ballot certification:

- Gregory T. Schorsch

==== Results ====
38th Ward General election
Party	Candidate	Votes	%
Nonpartisan	Nicholas Sposato (incumbent)	7,305	54.6
Nonpartisan	Ed Bannon	3,638	27.2
Nonpartisan	Cynthia M. Santos	1,431	10.7
Nonpartisan	Franco Reyes	659	4.9
Nonpartisan	Bruce Randazzo	354	2.6
Total votes		13,387	100%

=== Ward 39 ===
==== Candidates ====
Certified candidates
Candidate	Experience	Campaign	Ref
Denali Dasgupta	Data researcher and analyst Community activist		
Samantha Nugent	Incumbent (elected 2019)		

==== Endorsements ====
Denali Dasgupta

Organizations

- United Working Families
Samantha Nugent

State officials

- J. B. Pritzker, Governor of Illinois

==== Results ====
39th Ward General election
Party	Candidate	Votes	%
Nonpartisan	Samantha Nugent (incumbent)	8,975	62.7
Nonpartisan	Denali Dasgupta	5,346	37.3
Total votes		14,321	100.0

=== Ward 40 ===
==== Candidates ====
Certified candidates
Candidate	Experience	Campaign	Ref
Christian Blume	Attorney		
Jane Lucius	Beat facilitator for CAPS program		
Andre Vasquez	Incumbent (elected 2019)		

The following candidate filed petitions but was removed from the ballot:

- Eddien Enrique Gonzalez

==== Results ====
40th Ward General election
Party	Candidate	Votes	%
Nonpartisan	Andre Vasquez (incumbent)	10,594	78.9
Nonpartisan	Christian Blume	1,945	14.5
Nonpartisan	Jane Lucius	887	6.6
Total votes		13,426	100.0

=== Ward 41 ===
==== Candidates ====
Certified candidates
Candidate	Experience	Campaign	Ref
Anthony Napolitano	Incumbent (elected 2015)		
Paul Struebing	Member of Local School Council; Vice president of Edison Park Community Council		

==== Results ====
41st Ward General election
Party	Candidate	Votes	%
Nonpartisan	Anthony Napolitano (incumbent)	12,714	72.9
Nonpartisan	Paul Struebing	4,729	27.1
Total votes		17,443	100.0

=== Ward 42 ===
==== Candidates ====
Incumbent alderperson Brendan Reilly (elected 2007) is running uncontested for re-election. Challenger Chris Cleary filed nominating petitions, but withdrew before ballot certification.

==== Results ====
42nd Ward General election
Party	Candidate	Votes	%
Nonpartisan	Brendan Reilly (incumbent)	9,574	100.0
Total votes		9,574	100.0

=== Ward 43 ===
==== Candidates ====
Certified candidates
Candidate	Experience	Campaign	Ref
Steve Botsford	Real estate investor Former staffer for U.S. Rep. Tony Cárdenas		
Brian Comer	President of Sheffield Neighborhood Association; Former renewable energy development and business executive		
Rebecca Janowitz	Attorney; Former special assistant to Ald. Toni Preckwinkle; Former special projects coordinator for Chicago Public Schools		
Timmy Knudsen	Incumbent (appointed in September 2022); Attorney		
Steven McClellan	Nonprofit founder and member of Local School Council		
Wendi Taylor Nations	Public affairs consultant		

==== Results ====
43rd Ward General election
Party	Candidate	Votes	%
Nonpartisan	Timmy Knudsen (incumbent)	3,950	26.8
Nonpartisan	Brian Comer	3,543	24.1
Nonpartisan	Rebecca Janowitz	2,917	19.8
Nonpartisan	Wendi Taylor Nations	1,984	13.5
Nonpartisan	Steve Botsford	1,331	9.1
Nonpartisan	Steven Mcclellan	990	6.7
Total votes		14,715	100.0

Runoff

43rd Ward Runoff election
Party	Candidate	Votes	%
Nonpartisan	Timmy Knudsen	9,227	52.95%
Nonpartisan	Brian C. Comer	8,199	47.05%
Total votes		17,426	100%

=== Ward 44 ===
==== Candidates ====
Bennett Lawson, chief of staff to incumbent Tom Tunney and former legislative aide, is running uncontested. Challenger Nathan Bean filed nominating petitions, but was removed from the ballot for improperly filing paperwork. Bean has filed a lawsuit to challenge the Board of Election's ruling.

==== Endorsements ====
Bennett Lawson

State officials

- J. B. Pritzker, Governor of Illinois

Local officials

- Tom Tunney, member of Chicago City Council for the 44th ward (retiring)

==== Results ====
44th Ward General election
Party	Candidate	Votes	%
Nonpartisan	Bennett Lawson	12,705	98.9
Nonpartisan	Nathan Bean (write-in)	144	1.1
Total votes		12,849	100.0

=== Ward 45 ===
==== Candidates ====
Certified candidates
Candidate	Experience	Campaign	Ref
Susanna Ernst	Community activist		
Jim Gardiner	Incumbent (elected 2019)		
Megan Mathias	Attorney		
Ana Santoyo	Activist and library page		
James Suh	Local business owner		
Marija Tomic	Project manager and banker		

==== Endorsements ====
Megan Mathias

Federal officials:

- Jan Schakowsky, U.S. Representative for Illinois' 9th district

State legislators:

- Lindsey LaPointe, Illinois state representative for the 19th district

Local officials:

- Bridget Degnen, member of the Cook County Board of Commissioners for the 12th district
- Josina Morita, member of the Cook County Board of Commissioners for the 13th district
- Samanatha Steele, Cook County Board of Review Commissioner

Individuals:

- Susanna Ernst, candidate for 45th ward alderperson (endorsed for runoff)
- James Suh, candidate for 45th ward alderperson (endorsed for runoff)

==== Results ====
General election

45th Ward General election
Party	Candidate	Votes	%
Nonpartisan	Jim Gardiner (incumbent)	7,683	48.0
Nonpartisan	Megan Mathias	2,699	16.9
Nonpartisan	James Suh	2,279	14.2
Nonpartisan	Susanna Ernst	1,887	11.8
Nonpartisan	Ana Santoyo	895	5.6
Nonpartisan	Marija Tomic	562	3.5
Total votes		16,005	100%

Runoff

45th Ward Runoff election
Party	Candidate	Votes	%
Nonpartisan	James "Jim" Gardiner	9,488	53.60%
Nonpartisan	Megan Mathias	8,214	46.40%
Total votes		17,702	100%

=== Ward 46 ===
==== Candidates ====
Certified candidates
Candidate	Experience	Campaign	Ref
Angela Clay	Community activist Candidate for 46th ward alderperson in 2019		
Michael Cortez	Real estate agent		
Marianne Lalonde	Scientific research consultant Candidate for 46th ward alderperson in 2019		
Patrick Nagle	Administrative law judge for the Social Security Administration		
Kim Walz	Executive; Former legislative aide for Congressman Mike Quigley		
Roushaunda Williams	Union bartender and former social worker Vice President of Illinois AFL-CIO Executive Board		

==== Endorsements ====
Angela Clay

Labor unions

- Chicago Teachers Union
- Cook County College Teachers Union
- Illinois Nurses Association
- AFSCME Council 31 (endorsed for runoff)

Organizations

- United Working Families
- ONE People's Campaign
- 33rd Ward Working Families
- Chicago Democratic Socialists of America
- Asian American Midwest Progressives
- JCUA Votes
- Northside Action for Justice
- Northside Democracy for America
- Sunrise Chicago
- Sierra Club Illinois Chapter

State legislators:

- Mike Simmons, Illinois state senator for the 7th district (endorsed for runoff)

Local officials:

- Maria Hadden, member of City Council for the 49th ward (2019-present) (endorsed for runoff)
- Matt Martin, member of City Council for the 47th ward (2019-present)
- Andre Vasquez, member of City Council for the 40th ward (endorsed for runoff)

Individuals:

- Helen Shiller, former 46th ward alderperson
- Marianne Lalonde, candidate for 46th ward alderperson in 2019 and 2023 (endorsed for runoff)
Kim Walz

Federal officials

- Mike Quigley, U.S. Representative for Illinois' 5th district
- Jan Schakowsky, U.S. Representative for Illinois' 9th district

State officials

- J. B. Pritzker, Governor of Illinois

Individuals

- Patrick Nagle, candidate for 46th ward alderperson in 2023 (endorsed for runoff)
Roushaunda Williams

Organizations

- Chicago Federation of Labor
- UNITE HERE Local 1
- LiUNA
- IUOE Local 150

==== Results ====
General election

46th Ward General election
Party	Candidate	Votes	%
Nonpartisan	Angela Clay	5,663	36.1
Nonpartisan	Kim Walz	4,048	25.8
Nonpartisan	Marianne Lalonde	2,760	17.6
Nonpartisan	Patrick Nagle	1,764	11.3
Nonpartisan	Roushaunda Williams	1,154	7.4
Nonpartisan	Michael Cortez	283	1.8
Total votes		15,672	100.0

Runoff

46th Ward Runoff election
Party	Candidate	Votes	%
Nonpartisan	Angela Clay	9,963	56.18%
Nonpartisan	Kim Walz	7,772	43.82%
Total votes		17,735	100%

=== Ward 47 ===
Incumbent alderperson Matt Martin (elected 2019) is running uncontested for re-election.

==== Endorsements ====
Matt Martin

Organizations

- United Working Families

Labor Unions

- Service Employees International Union local 73

==== Results ====
47th Ward General election
Party	Candidate	Votes	%
Nonpartisan	Matt Martin (incumbent)	16,253	100.0
Total votes		16,253	100.0

=== Ward 48 ===
==== Candidates ====
Certified candidates
Candidate	Experience	Campaign	Ref
Joe Dunne	Affordable housing developer Former chair and member of Local School Council		
Nassir Faulker	Digital communications manager		
Brian Haag	Small business owner		
Leni Manaa-Hoppenworth	Small business owner Andersonville Chamber of Commerce board member		
Isaac Freilich Jones	Assistant Illinois attorney general Public interest lawyer		
Andy Peters	Restaurauter; Andersonville Chamber of Commerce member		
Andre Peloquin	Real estate broker		
Larry Svabek	Lecturer at University of Chicago		
Roxanne Volkmann	Deputy Director of Housing and Urban Development, Chicago Office; Chinese Mutual Aid Association board member		
Nick Ward	Nonprofit and restaurant worker Member of Local School Council		

The following candidates launched campaigns but withdrew before filing nominating petitions:

- Seva Gandhi (dropped out in September 2022)
- Dennis Sneyers (dropped out in November 2022)

Endorsements

Joe Dunne

Individuals

- Former Illinois Governor Pat Quinn
- Alderman Harry Osterman (48th)
- Former 48th Ward Alderman Mary Ann Smith
- Former State Senator Heather Steans (7th)
- Former State Representative Greg Harris
- Cook County Commissioner Bridget Gainer (10th District)

Organizations

- American Federation of State, County, and Municipal Employees (AFSCME) Council 31
- Carpenters Union - Mid-America Carpenters Regional Council
- Chicago Federation of Labor
- Chicago Laborers District Council
- Chicago Fire Fighters Union Local 2
- International Brotherhood of Electrical Workers Local 9
- International Brotherhood of Electrical Workers Local 134
- International Brotherhood of Electrical Workers Local 134
- International Union of Operating Engineers Local 150
- International Union of Operating Engineers Local 399
- Plumbers Local 130
- The Ironworkers District Council of Chicago and Vicinity
- The International Union of Bricklayers and Allied Craftworkers
- The Teamsters Joint Council 25
Isaac Freilich Jones

Individuals

- Carol Ronen, Democratic Committeewoman of the 9th Congressional District, State Senator
Leni Manaa-Hoppenworth

Organizations

- Indivisible IL9 - Andersonville-Edgewater
- Indivisible Illinois

Individuals

- Theresa Mah, Illinois State Representative 2nd district
Andre Peloquin

Individuals

- Maggie O'Keefe, Democratic Committeewoman of the 40th Ward
Nick Ward

Organizations

- 48th Ward Neighbors for Justice
- American Middle East Voters Alliance Political Action Committee
- Asian American Midwest Progressives
- Chicago Democratic Socialists of America
- Chicago Teachers Union (Local 1)
- Cook County College Teachers Union (Local 1600)
- Democratic Socialists of America (National)
- Illinois Nurses Association
- Illinois Sierra Club
- Independent Voters of Illinois - Independent Precinct Organization
- Northside Democracy for America
- ONE People's Campaign

Individuals

- Anthony Joel Quezada, Cook County Commissioner, 8th District
- Carlos Ramirez-Rosa, Alderman and Democratic Committeeman of the 35th Ward
- Daniel La Spata, Alderman and Democratic Committeeman of the 1st Ward

==== Results ====
General election

48th Ward General election
Party	Candidate	Votes	%
Nonpartisan	Joe Dunne	4,181	26.3
Nonpartisan	Leni Manaa-Hoppenworth	3,647	22.9
Nonpartisan	Nick Ward	2,956	18.6
Nonpartisan	Isaac Freilich Jones	1,609	10.1
Nonpartisan	Larry Svabek	1,039	6.5
Nonpartisan	Roxanne Volkmann	880	5.5
Nonpartisan	Andy Peters	589	3.7
Nonpartisan	Nassir Faulkner	394	2.5
Nonpartisan	Andre Peloquin	374	2.4
Nonpartisan	Brian Haag	234	1.5
Total votes		15,903	100.0

Runoff

48th Ward Runoff election
Party	Candidate	Votes	%
Nonpartisan	Leni Manaa-Hoppenworth	9,289	52.48%
Nonpartisan	Joe Dunne	8,411	47.52%
Total votes		17,700	100%

=== Ward 49 ===
==== Candidates ====
Certified candidates
Candidate	Experience	Campaign	Ref
Maria Hadden	Incumbent (elected 2019)		
Bill Morton	President of the Rogers Park Chamber of Commerce; Candidate for 49th ward alderperson in 2019 and committeeman in 2020		
Belia Rodriguez	Board president of the Rogers Park Business Alliance		

The following candidate was removed from the ballot due to insufficient petition signatures:

- Williamton "Willie" Davis

==== Endorsements ====
Maria Hadden

State officials

- J. B. Pritzker, Governor of Illinois

Organizations

- United Working Families

Labor Unions

- Service Employees International Union local 73
- Chicago Federation of Labor

==== Results ====
49th Ward General election
Party	Candidate	Votes	%
Nonpartisan	Maria Hadden (incumbent)	8,266	73.7
Nonpartisan	Belia Rodriguez	1,867	16.6
Nonpartisan	Bill Morton	1,086	9.7
Nonpartisan	Willie Davis (write-in)	3	0.0
Total votes		11,222	100.0

=== Ward 50 ===
==== Candidates ====
Certified candidates
Candidate	Experience	Campaign	Ref
Mueze Bawany	Chicago Public Schools teacher Community activist		
Debra Silverstein	Incumbent (elected 2011)		

==== Endorsements ====
Mueze Bawany

Organizations

- Asian American Midwest Progressives
- United Working Families
- Chicago Teachers Union
- JCUA Votes
Debra Silverstein

State officials

- J. B. Pritzker, Governor of Illinois
- Humane Society Legislative Fund

==== Results ====
50th Ward General election
Party	Candidate	Votes	%
Nonpartisan	Debra Silverstein (incumbent)	7,024	67.7
Nonpartisan	Mueze Bawany	3,349	32.3
Total votes		10,373	100.0
