= Walter Burnett Jr. =

American politician (born 1963)

Walter Burnett
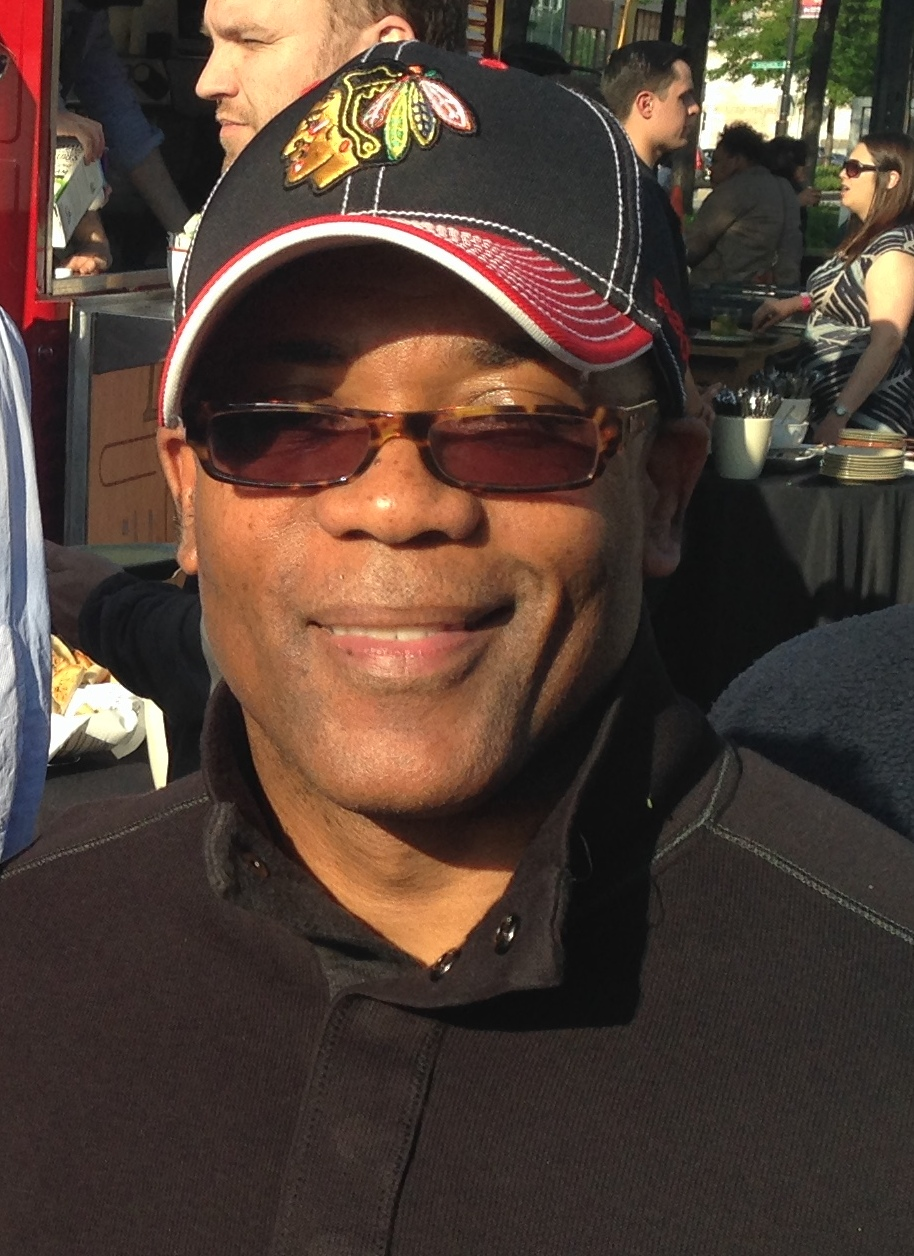
- Burnett in 2015

9th Vice Mayor of Chicago
- In office May 15, 2023 – August 7, 2025
- Mayor: Brandon Johnson
- Preceded by: Tom Tunney
- Succeeded by: Vacant

Member of the Chicago City Council from the 27th ward
- In office May 1, 1995 – August 7, 2025
- Preceded by: Dexter Watson
- Succeeded by: Red Burnett

Personal details
- Born: August 16, 1963 (age 62) Chicago, Illinois, U.S.
- Party: Democratic
- Spouse: Darlena Williams (m. 1991)
- Children: 2, Omar (stepson)
- Education: Harold Washington College; University of Illinois, Chicago; Southeastern Illinois College; Northeastern Illinois University (BA)
- Website: Official website

Walter Burnett Jr. (born August 16, 1963) is an American politician who served as the alderman for Chicago's 27th ward from 1995 to 2025. The 27th ward includes the West Loop, Greektown, East Garfield Park, Near North Side, Old Town, West Humboldt Park, West Town, Goose Island and the Illinois Medical District. From 2023 to 2025, he also served as vice mayor of Chicago.

== Early life and education ==
Walter Burnett, Jr. was born August 16, 1963, at Cook County Hospital in the Illinois Medical District. Burnett served two years in jail for armed bank robbery in Kankakee. Burnett agreed to drive two friends to Kankakee, where they robbed the Momence Federal Savings and Loan of $3,000. The trio then stopped at a convenience store, where they stole a car and kidnapped its driver at gunpoint.

== Political career ==
Burnett had an 11-year career working for the Cook County government, where he had a variety of jobs including working as special assistant to Jesse White who was then Cook County Recorder of Deeds. Burnett later worked on Jesse White's campaign for Illinois Secretary of State. In 2023, Gregory Hinz of Crain's Chicago Business described Burnett as being a protege of White.

== Aldermanic career ==
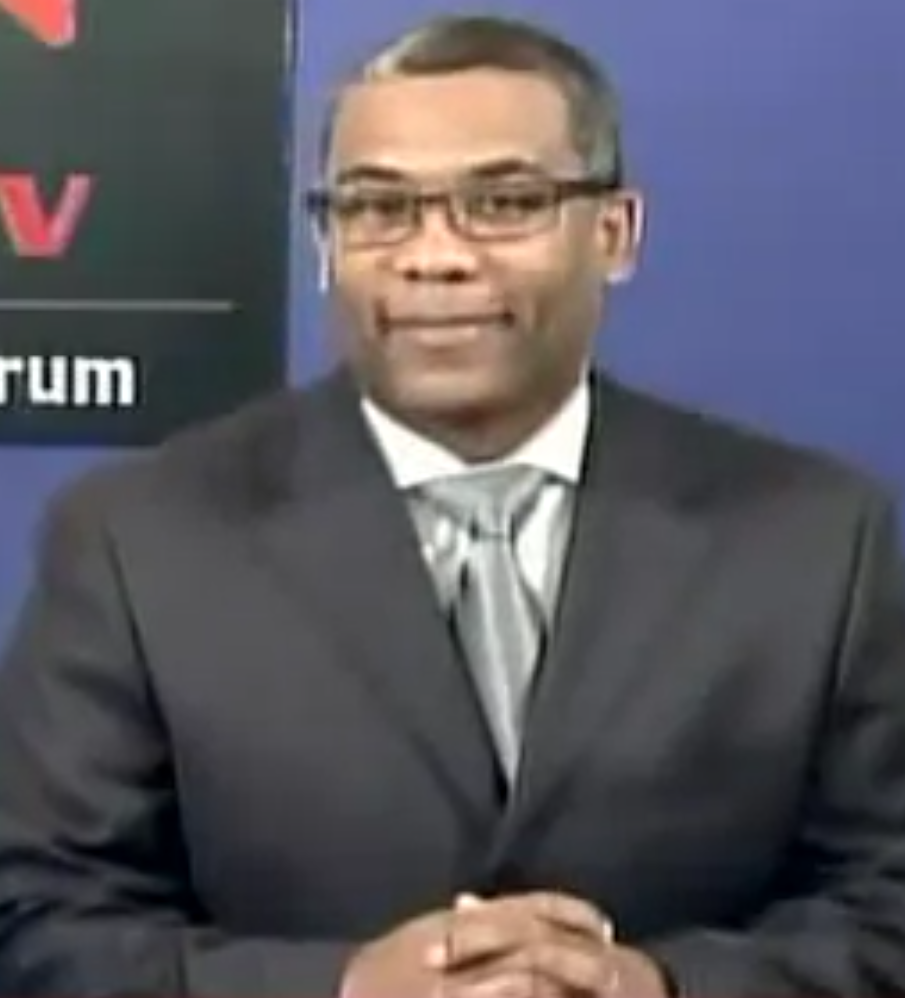
Burnett in 2014

Despite a 1993 Illinois state law that barred those convicted of a felony from holding local office, in 1995 Burnett ran for alderman in the newly redistricted 27th ward. Burnett defeated Dexter Watson, a protege of Rickey R. Hendon who had been appointed to succeed Hendon after Hendon's election to the Illinois Senate. Burnett has subsequently been reelected in 1999, 2003, 2007, 2011, 2015, 2019, and 2023.

In 2018, J. B. Pritzker appointed Burnett to the gubernatorial transition's Restorative Justice and Safe Communities Committee.

Ahead of the 2011 Chicago mayoral election, Burnett was one of several black Chicago political figures involved in talks to have three black contenders choose a "consensus" black candidate to rally around. These talks led Congressman Danny Davis and State Senator James Meeks to withdraw from the election and endorse the candidacy of Carol Moseley Braun, a former United States Senator and ambassador, as the "consensus" black candidate. In the runoff of the 2019 Chicago mayoral election, Burnett endorsed Toni Preckwinkle against Lori Lightfoot. In the initial round of the 2023 Chicago mayoral election, Burnett endorsed Mayor Lori Lightfoot for reelection. After Lightfoot was eliminated in the 2023 election's first round, Burnett endorsed Paul Vallas in the runoff.

After becoming mayor in 2023, Brandon Johnson selected Burnett to serve as vice mayor. Unlike previous vice mayors, for whom the position was mostly-ceremonial and had no budget, Johnson reorganized the position for Burnett to have a $400,000 budget and act as an official community liaison for the mayoral administration.

In July 2025, midway through his eighth term, Burnett announced that he would retire from the City Council, effective on August 7, 2025. Johnson appointed Walter Redmond "Red" Burnett, Burnett's son, to fill the seat. Red Burnett took his seat on September 25, 2025.

== Personal life ==
Alderman Burnett is married to Darlena Williams-Burnett. Williams-Burnett was appointed as a Cook County commissioner from the 1st district, being appointed after Danny K. Davis resigned in 1997 to serve in the United States Congress. She was defeated in her campaign for a full term in 1998. Williams-Burnett challenged incumbent 7th district U.S. congressman Danny K. Davis in the 2010 Democratic primary and lost.
