= Bennett Lawson =

American politician

- Lawson in 2026

Member of the Chicago City Council from the 44th ward
- Incumbent
- Assumed office May 15, 2023
- Preceded by: Tom Tunney

Personal details
- Born: July 2, 1978 (age 48) Rockford, Illinois, U.S.
- Party: Democratic
- Education: Loyola University Chicago (BA)

Bennett Lawson (born July 2, 1978) is an American politician from Chicago representing portions of the Lakeview, Northalsted, and Wrigleyville neighborhoods. He is the Alderman for Chicago City Council's 44th Ward, and took office on May 15, 2023. He won the 2023 election for the seat, running unopposed following the retirement of longtime Alderman Tom Tunney. He previously served for 15 years as Tunney's Chief of Staff. He serves as Vice Chair of the Committee on Zoning, Landmarks, and Building Standards and a member of other committees, where he has focused on balanced housing development, small business support, safe and walkable communities, and LGBTQ+ advocacy.

== Early Career and Background ==
Lawson was born in Rockford, Illinois, and attended Rockford Auburn High School. His father was a teacher.

He graduated from Loyola University Chicago in 2000 with a degree in political science and began his public service career working for former State Senator Carol Ronen. He joined the 44th Ward office in 2004, serving as chief of staff to his predecessor, Alderman Tom Tunney, before succeeding him as Alderman in 2023.

As a staffer, Lawson worked on major development projects including the creation of the Center on Halsted community center, the adaptive reuse of the former 19th District police station into an LGBTQ+ senior living facility, the construction of Howard Brown Health’s clinic on Halsted, work on zoning modernization, retail development projects, and public safety.

He is one of several openly LGBTQ+ members serving on the Chicago City Council. He lives in Northalsted area of Lakeview with his husband, Pete.

== Local Initiatives ==
Prior to taking office in 2023, Lawson conducted a community survey to obtain input from residents on priorities for the 44th Ward. The survey received 2,022 responses and identified public safety, small business support, housing affordability, infrastructure, and public transit access as top concerns. The results also indicated interest in increasing green space, adding family-friendly amenities, and improving public transit and pedestrian and cyclist infrastructure. The survey informed Lawson’s early legislative agenda and later community planning efforts.

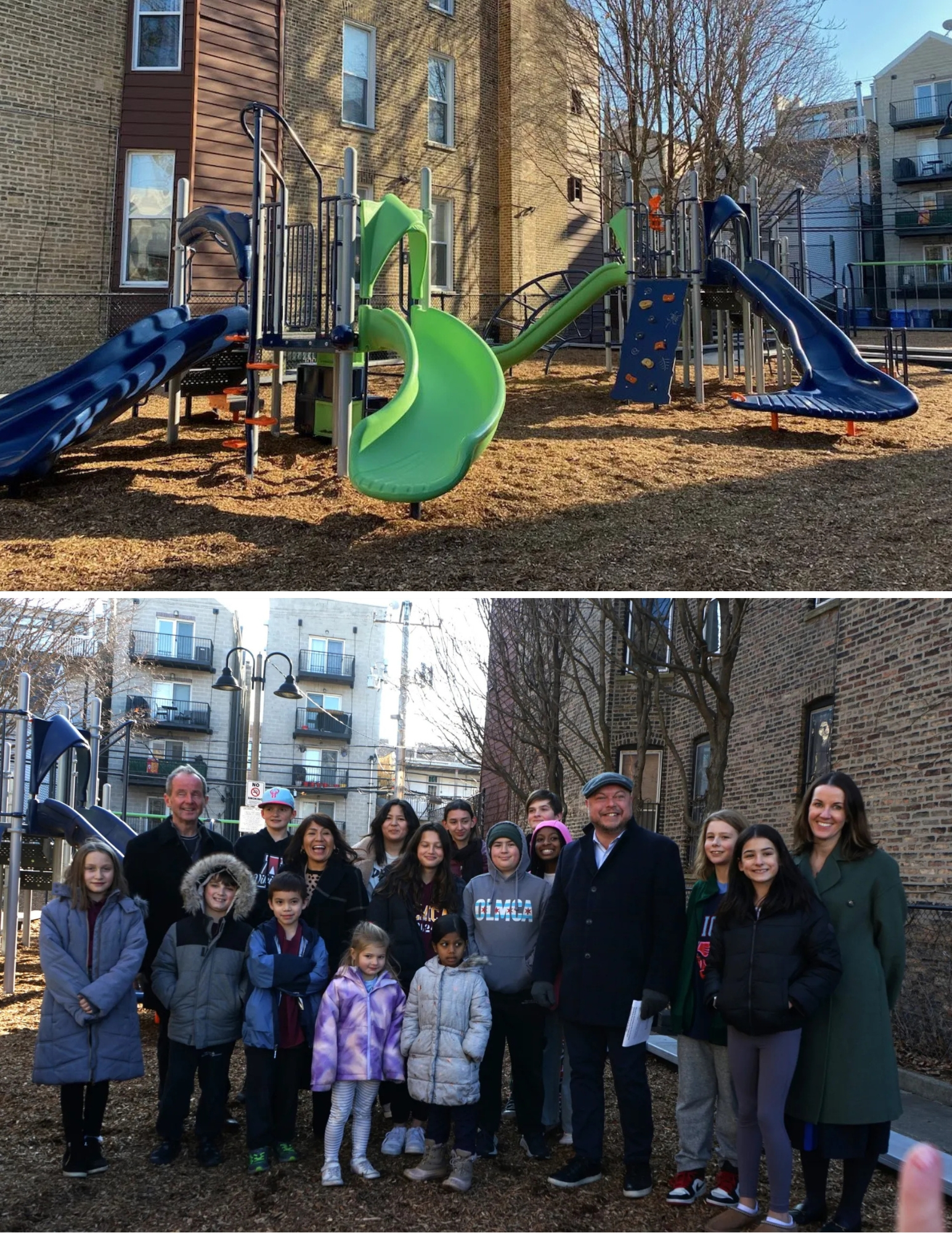
2023 Evergreen Playlot Park Renovation

Lawson was elected Alderman in 2023 and has supported a number of local improvement projects within the 44th Ward. He has allocated $100,000 in funding toward the planned construction of a new 25,000 square foot Lakeview Dog Park and oversaw the renovation of Evergreen Playlot Park. His office has coordinated upgrades to the Belmont CTA station, and alley and sidewalk repairs. Lawson has also hosted public workshops on property tax relief, created community Advisory Councils on issues including safety and housing development, and organized events such as the annual Senior Picnic and Kids’ Bike Parade.

In late 2024, Lawson launched a community feedback and planning process to create the first neighborhood plan for Lakeview since 2006 - the 2025 44th Ward Community Plan.

== City Council Tenure and Policy Focus ==
Lawson began his term by introducing a package of ordinances aimed at improving neighborhood livability and streamlining small business operations. These included efforts to lower speed limits in front of a local hospital to enhance pedestrian safety, and remove regulatory barriers for personal services businesses (nail salons, beauty shops, barbershops, etc). Early in his tenure, he also supported the financing of 'Lakeview Landing,' a 37-unit ADA accessible affordable housing development at 835 W Addison Street and voted in favor of expanding outdoor dining citywide.

Throughout his term, he has prioritized addressing the housing shortage. In 2024, he introduced legislation to legalize accessory dwelling units (ADUs)—such as coach houses and attic and basement units—citywide. The legislation expanded a pilot program and was intended to support affordability, intergenerational living, and increased housing supply without using public funds.

In February of 2025, Lawson also passed an ordinance simplifying the process of converting commercial space into ground-floor residential units, aiming to expand accessible housing, decrease the presence of vacant storefronts, and address rising housing costs.

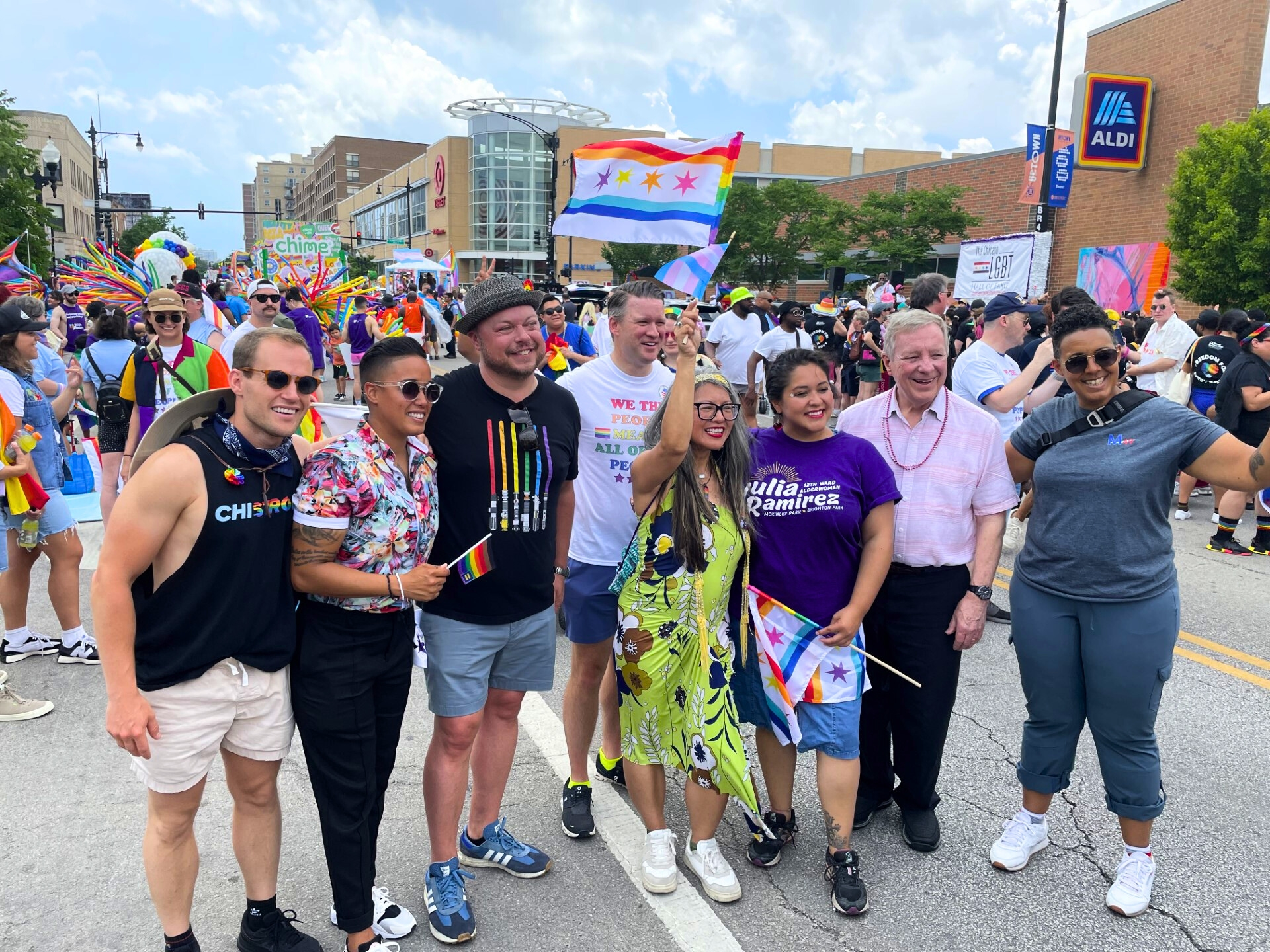
Alderman Lawson and Chicago City Council Members at 2024 Pride Parade

He has advocated for LGBTQ+-inclusive public health, senior services, and housing. In 2024, he passed an ordinance to create Honorary Rich Pfeiffer Parade Way, honoring the late Pride Parade coordinator.

Lawson has also co-sponsored major legislation, including the 'Chi vs Hate' ordinance to expand reporting of hate incidents, ethics reforms, composting pilot programs, and budget measures to increase youth programming, mental health response, and anti-violence funding. Lawson also co-sponsored an ordinance to raise penalties for hate-related graffiti.

== See also ==
- List of Chicago alderpersons since 1923
