= Maria Hadden =

American politician and activist

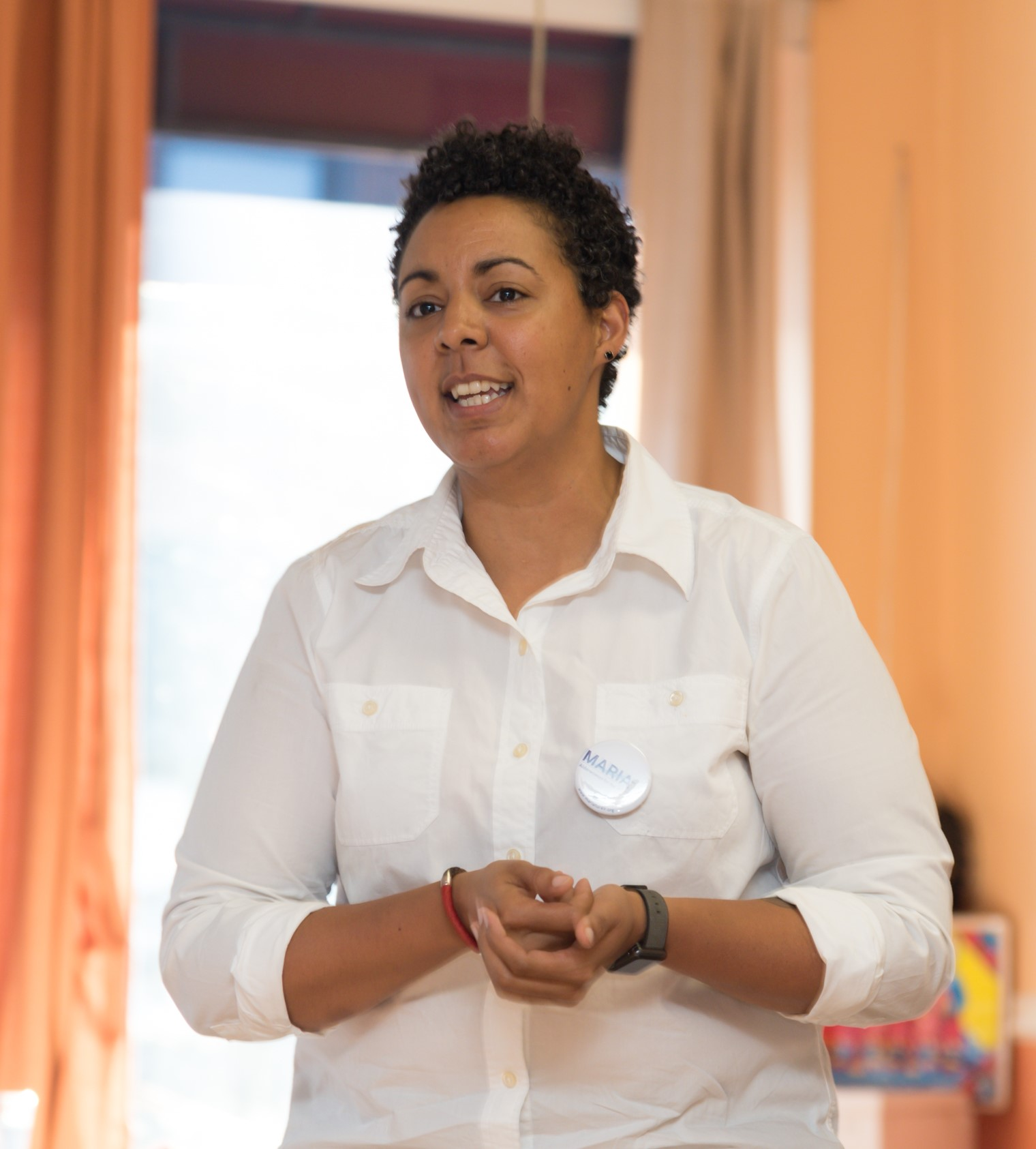
- Hadden in 2018

Member of the Chicago City Council from the 49th ward
- Incumbent
- Assumed office May 20, 2019
- Preceded by: Joe Moore

Personal details
- Born: Maria Elaine Hadden; January 20, 1981 (age 45) Columbus, Ohio, U.S.
- Party: Democratic
- Spouse: Natalia Vera
- Education: Ohio State University (BA); DePaul University (MS)

Maria Elaine Hadden is an American politician and community activist from Chicago. She is a member of the Chicago City Council, serving as alderperson for the city's 49th ward. She won election to that office after defeating 28-year incumbent Joe Moore in the 2019 election, and was reelected in 2023. The 49th ward includes most of Rogers Park and portions of West Ridge. She is a member of the Progressive Caucus, Black Caucus, and LGBT Caucus in the City Council.

== Early life and education ==
Hadden was born in Columbus, Ohio in 1981. She earned her bachelor's degree in international peace and conflict studies from the Ohio State University, and subsequently moved to Waukegan, Illinois to begin a job with the AmeriCorps VISTA program in 2003. She moved to Chicago in 2004. She later earned a master's degree in international public service management from DePaul University.

== Early activist and political career ==
Hadden was a founding board member of the Participatory Budgeting Project, where she worked from 2010 to 2018 to bring participatory budgeting to midwestern and southern cities. She later served as the executive director of the non-profit Our City Our Voice. She also served on the boards of directors of the non-profit Voqal and of Black Youth Project 100. She was an active member of Network 49, an independent political organization based in Rogers Park, and of United Working Families.

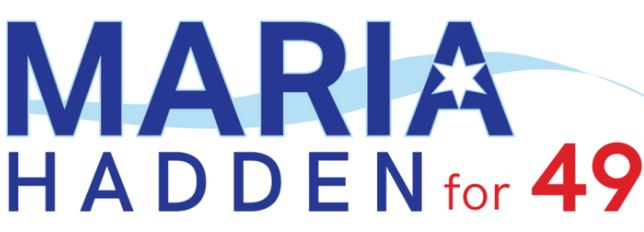
Logo for Hadden's 2019 campaign for 49th ward alderwoman

== Chicago City Council (2019–present) ==
=== Elections ===
==== 2019 ====
On January 20, 2018, Hadden announced her campaign to run for alderman in the 49th ward, which covers most of Rogers Park and portions of West Ridge. After the submission and processing of ballot petitions, Hadden and incumbent Joe Moore were the only candidates to make it on the ballot for the 2019 election. Hadden's campaign emphasized development without displacement, funding for local public schools, and support for a strong local economy as key issues in the race. She received several endorsements from progressive activist groups, labor unions, and local politicians such Chuy García and David Orr. Although both candidates self-identified as progressives, observers and media outlets generally characterized Hadden as challenging Moore from the left. Hadden won the election on February 26, 2019, with 63% of the vote. She won a majority of the vote in 32 out of 33 precincts in the ward. With her win, Hadden is the first queer woman of color to be elected to the Chicago City Council. While Hadden is affiliated with the Democratic Party, she has said she would be "an independent alderman."

After her election, Hadden said that in her first few months in office, she would pursue a full assessment of infrastructure and services in the ward and set up an advisory committee for community engagement. On April 10, 2019, Hadden joined six other newly-elected members of the City Council in protesting against the approval of tax increment financing for the Lincoln Yards and The 78 real estate developments.

Hadden was sworn in as a member of Chicago City Council on May 20, 2019.

==== 2023 ====
Hadden ran for re-election in 2023, and faced two challengers affiliated with local business groups. She won the election on February 28, 2023, with 74% of the vote.

=== City-wide issues ===
==== City budget ====
Hadden was one of 11 aldermen who voted against Mayor Lori Lightfoot's proposed 2020 budget, alongside 8 other members of the progressive caucus. In a statement about her vote, Hadden stated, "I’m optimistic about the increased investments in housing, mental health care, homelessness prevention and concrete investments in the south and west sides of our city, but remain concerned that we haven’t exhausted all prospects of progressive revenue in order to take greater strides towards a budget that starts to repair decades of harm and inequity." Prior to the vote, Hadden spoke with constituents about the budget at multiple town hall meetings.

==== Public health ====
Hadden sponsored a "senior safety" ordinance, in collaboration with the Jane Addams senior caucus, that was passed in July 2020. The ordinance requires building managers in senior housing to conduct regular wellness checks on residents.

==== Environmental issues ====
Hadden was an early co-sponsor of legislation to ban single-use plastics and styrofoam in most restaurants.

=== Ward-level issues ===
==== Public health ====
During the COVID-19 pandemic, Hadden coordinated with state representative Kelly Cassidy and local community groups to create the Rogers Park community response team. The team's stated goal is to help Rogers Park residents stay informed and access resources needed amid the social distancing and shelter-in-place measures in place during the crisis. They have offered informational resources online, set up a hotline for residents to request advice, and volunteers trained to safely deliver groceries and prescriptions.

In August 2021, Hadden pushed for the Chicago Park District to install life rings at lakefront beaches and parks, following a drowning death and ongoing efforts by neighborhood residents. The Park District installed life rings in Rogers Park in September 2021 and pledged to add additional devices along the lakefront in subsequent months.

==== Crime ====
On March 19, 2026, Hadden referred to the killing of Sheridan Gorman, an 18-year-old college freshman attending Loyola University Chicago, as a "wrong place, wrong time" incident. The alleged killer is an illegal alien unlawfully residing in the United States. Amid controversy and threats related to this comment, Hadden temporarily closed her ward office on March 26, 2026, due to safety concerns.

=== Committees ===
During the 2019–23 term, Hadden was a member of eight standing committees in the City Council: economic, capital, and technology development; ethics and government oversight; environmental protection and energy; housing and real estate; human relations and health; special events, cultural affairs, and recreation; zoning, landmarks, and building standards; and committees and rules.

During the 2023–27 term, Hadden has been the chair of the Committee on Environmental Protection and Energy and the vice-chair of the Committee on Ethics and Government Oversight. She has also been a member of six other standing committees: immigrant and refugee rights; housing and real estate; health and human relations; public safety; budget and government operations; and committees and rules.

=== Alliances and relationships ===
In the 2019–23 term, Hadden joined the City Council's Progressive Caucus, Black Caucus, and LGBT Caucus, and pledged to join the council's Women's Caucus. She served as the treasurer for the Progressive Caucus. In the 2023–27 term, Hadden serves as the co-chair of the Progressive Caucus.

After winning her seat in the first round of the 2019 elections, Hadden endorsed several candidates vying for City Council seats, including Andre Vasquez, Jessica Gutierrez, Matt Martin, Robert Murphy, Rossana Rodríguez Sanchez, Rafa Yañez, and Jeanette Taylor. She declined to make an endorsement in the 2019 mayoral election, citing her goal of being an independent alderman as well as strong support received by both run-off candidates in the 49th ward in the first round. In the 2023 Chicago mayoral election, Hadden endorsed Brandon Johnson, who went on to win the election.

== Personal life ==
Hadden's longtime partner and spouse is Natalia Vera. Vera was elected as a member of the local school council for Joyce Kilmer Elementary School in Rogers Park in April 2018.

== Electoral history ==
2023 Chicago aldermanic election, 49th Ward
Party	Candidate	Votes	%
Nonpartisan	Maria Hadden (incumbent)	8,266	73.7
Nonpartisan	Belia Rodriguez	1,867	16.6
Nonpartisan	Bill Morton	1,086	9.7
Nonpartisan	Willie Davis (write-in)	3	0.0
Total votes		11,222	100.0

2019 Chicago aldermanic elections, 49th Ward
Party	Candidate	Votes	%
Nonpartisan	Maria Hadden	7,820	63.40
Nonpartisan	Joe Moore (incumbent)	4,514	36.60
Total votes		12,334	100.00

== See also ==
- List of Chicago alderpersons since 1923
