= Jeylú Gutiérrez =

American politician

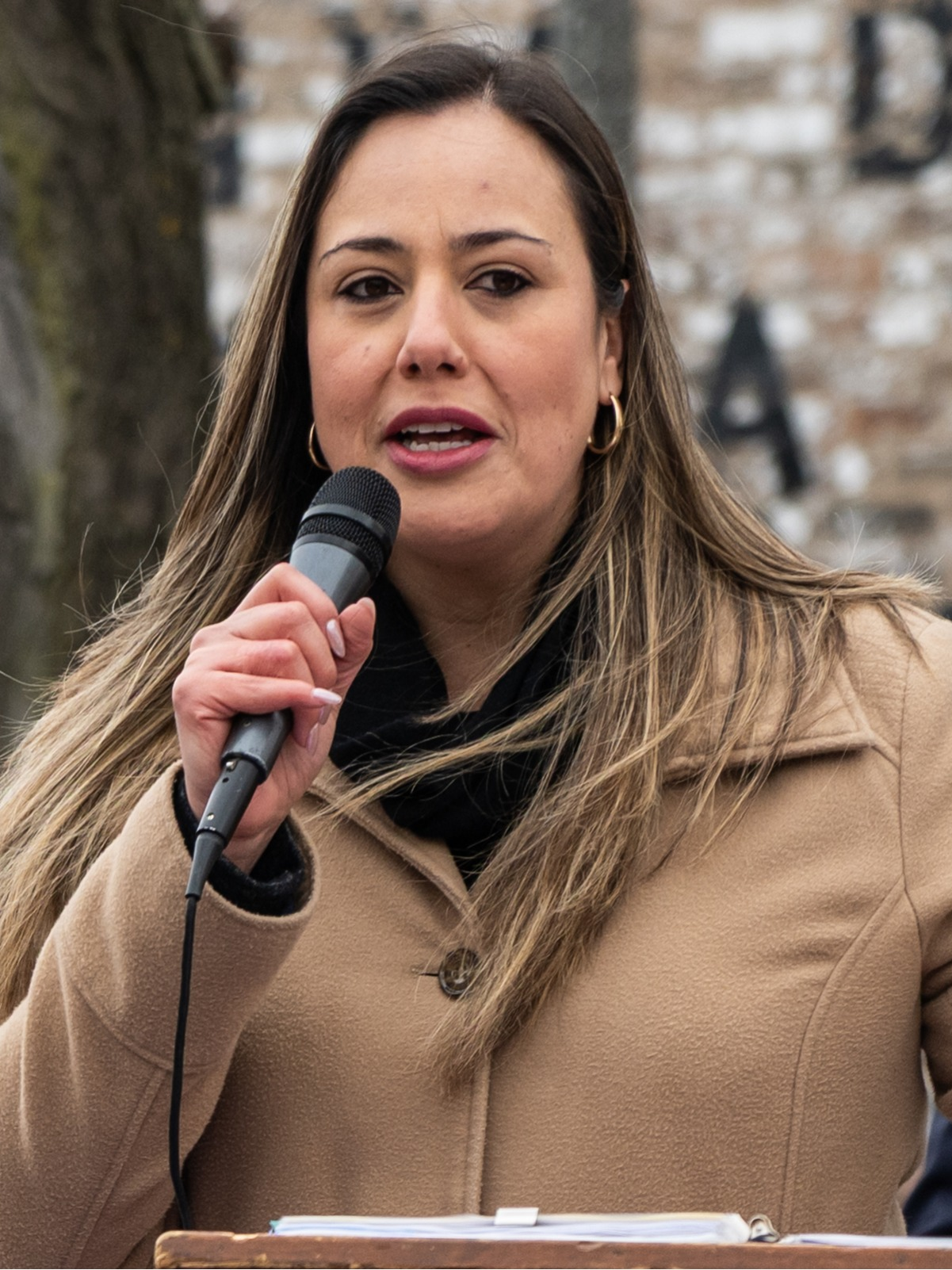
- Gutiérrez in 2025

Member of the Chicago City Council from the 14th ward
- Incumbent
- Assumed office May 15, 2023
- Preceded by: Edward M. Burke

Personal details
- Born: 1987 or 1988 (age 38–39) Mexico
- Party: Democratic
- Education: University of the Valley of Mexico (AA); Monterrey Institute of Technology and Higher Education (BA); National Louis University (BA)

Jeylú Gutiérrez (born 1987/1988) is an American politician from Chicago. She is the alderperson for Chicago City Council's 14th ward. She won the 2023 election to the office, replacing 54-year incumbent Ed Burke. The 14th ward includes parts of the Archer Heights and Gage Park neighborhoods.

== Early life and career ==
Gutiérrez was born in Mexico, and immigrated to Chicago in 2010. She worked as a counselor and community liaison for public schools, including Benito Juarez High School in Pilsen and Hernandez Middle School in Gage Park. Her interest in politics began as a volunteer in Chuy García's campaign for mayor in 2015. She later worked as a district director for Cook County Commissioner Alma Anaya.

In September 2022, Gutiérrez announced her campaign for alderperson of the 14th ward, along with an endorsement from U.S. Representative Chuy García. The 14th ward seat had been held since 1969 by Ed Burke, who had been indicted in 2019 and was awaiting trial for corruption and racketeering charges. Redistricting following the 2020 Census changed the boundaries of the 14th ward such that its Latino majority grew and some majority-white precincts that had heavily favored Burke were removed. In November, Burke announced that he would not seek re-election. After Burke's exit, Gutiérrez faced Raúl Reyes, a staff assistant in the City Clerk's office who had ties to Burke. Gutiérrez received endorsements and contributions from state senator Celina Villaneuva, state representative Aaron Ortiz, and the SEIU Illinois Council PAC. In the February 2023 election, Gutiérrez won with over 65% of the vote.

== Electoral history ==
2023 Chicago aldermanic election, 14th ward, first round
Party	Candidate	Votes	%
Nonpartisan	Jeylú Gutiérrez	3,081	65.2
Nonpartisan	Raul Reyes	1,647	34.8
Total votes		4,728	100%

== See also ==
- List of Chicago alderpersons since 1923
