= Leni Manaa-Hoppenworth =

American politician and businesswoman

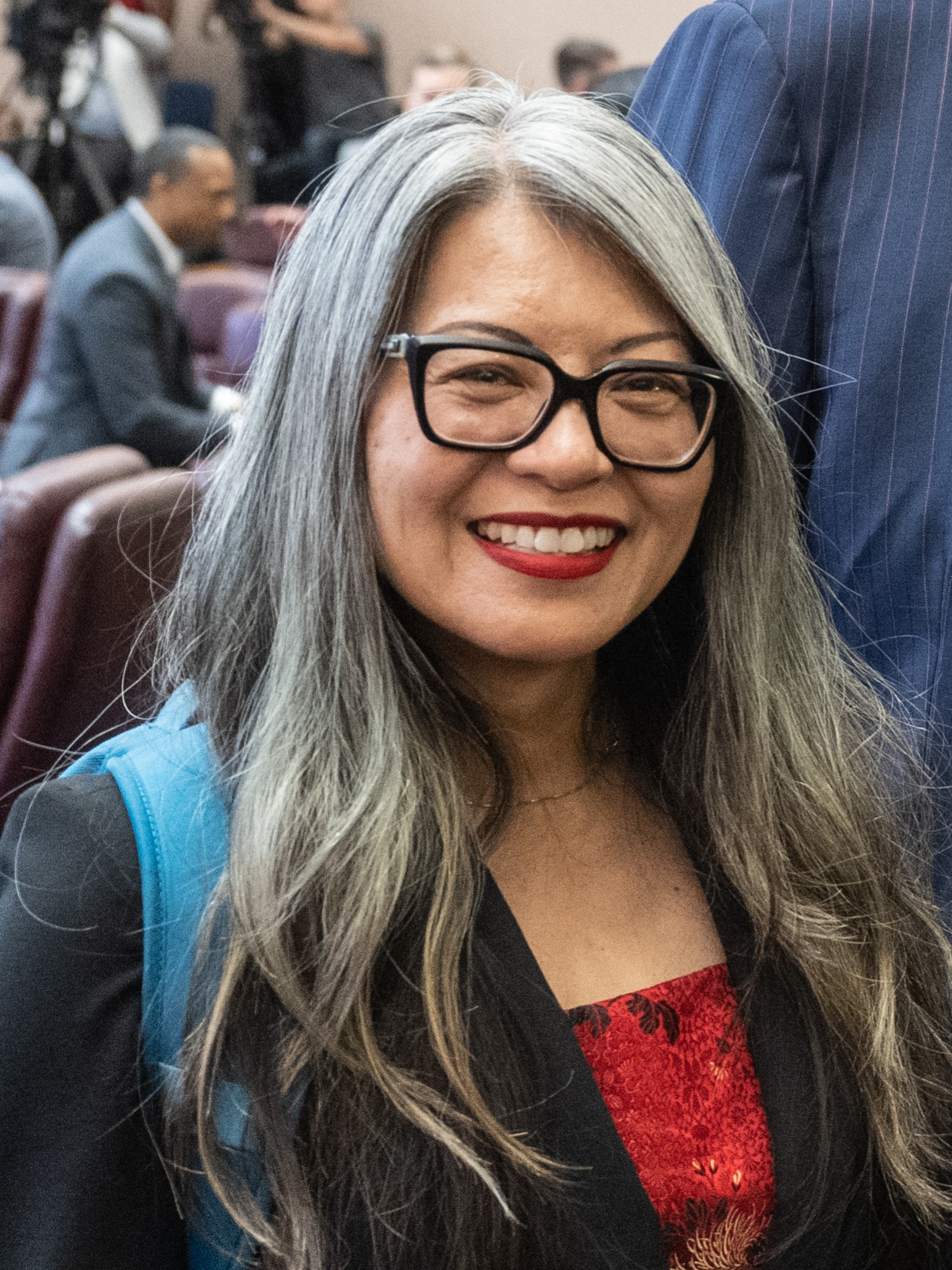

Member of the Chicago City Council from the 48th ward
- Incumbent
- Assumed office May 15, 2023
- Preceded by: Harry Osterman

Personal details
- Born: 1969 or 1970 (age 56–57)
- Party: Democratic
- Education: University of Illinois, Chicago (BS)

Leni Manaa-Hoppenworth (born 1969) is an American politician and small business owner. She is the alderman for the 48th ward in the Chicago City Council, having won the 2023 election for the office. The 48th ward includes most of the Edgewater neighborhood and parts of the Uptown neighborhood.

== Early life and career ==
Manaa-Hoppenworth is the daughter of Filipino immigrants. She graduated from Chicago Academy for the Arts and later earned a bachelor's degree in physical therapy at the University of Illinois Chicago. She is the owner of a dance supply store and is a freelance professional photographer. She has also worked as a dance instructor, physical therapist, and account representative for the Chicago Reader.

== Early activist and political career ==
After the election of Donald Trump in the 2016 United States presidential election, Manaa-Hoppenworth co-founded Indivisible Illinois, the state chapter of the national progressive organization Indivisible. She also founded and led Indivisible Illinois 9th District Andersonville-Edgewater, a local chapter of the organization. She was also the director of operations for the 2017 Women's March's Chicago protest, helped found non-partisan voter registration organization ILVOTE, and served on the board of the Andersonville Chamber of Commerce.

In July 2022, incumbent 48th ward alderman Harry Osterman announced that he would not run for re-election. Manaa-Hoppenworth announced her candidacy for the seat in August, joining what would become a ten-candidate field. In the first round election on February 28, 2023, she placed second and advanced to a runoff election against Joe Dunne. During the runoff campaign, she endorsed and was endorsed by mayoral candidate Brandon Johnson. She won the runoff election on April 4, despite Dunne having a fundraising advantage and the endorsement of Osterman. She is the first Filipino American member of City Council and is one of two Asian Americans elected in the 2023 election (alongside Nicole Lee).

== Chicago City Council (2023–present) ==
Manaa-Hoppenworth has said she will join the Progressive Caucus on City Council, and that her initial priorities include "approving ranked-choice voting, homelessness prevention effort Bring Chicago Home and the emergency mental health initiative Treatment Not Trauma."

== Personal life ==
Manaa-Hoppenworth is openly queer. She has lived, worked, and raised a family in Chicago since 1999.

== Electoral history ==
2023 Chicago aldermanic election, 48th ward, runoff election
Party	Candidate	Votes	%
Nonpartisan	Leni Manaa-Hoppenworth	9,289	52.48%
Nonpartisan	Joe Dunne	8,411	47.52%
Total votes		17,700	100%

2023 Chicago aldermanic election, 48th ward, general election
Party	Candidate	Votes	%
Nonpartisan	Joe Dunne	4,181	26.3
Nonpartisan	Leni Manaa-Hoppenworth	3,647	22.9
Nonpartisan	Nick Ward	2,956	18.6
Nonpartisan	Isaac Freilich Jones	1,609	10.1
Nonpartisan	Larry Svabek	1,039	6.5
Nonpartisan	Roxanne Volkmann	880	5.5
Nonpartisan	Andy Peters	589	3.7
Nonpartisan	Nassir Faulkner	394	2.5
Nonpartisan	Andre Peloquin	374	2.4
Nonpartisan	Brian Haag	234	1.5
Total votes		15,903	100.0

== See also ==
- List of Chicago alderpersons since 1923
