= Tom Tunney =

Entrepreneur and politician from Chicago, Illinois

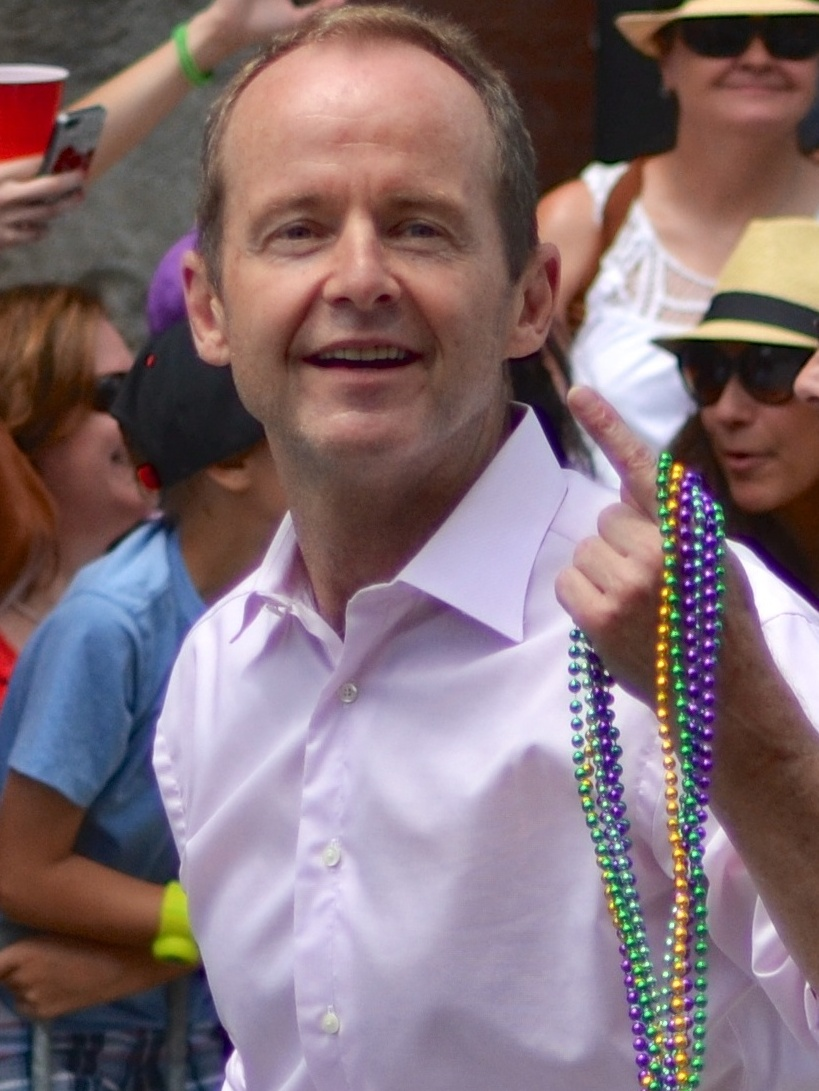
- Tunney at the Chicago Pride Parade in June 2013

8th Vice Mayor of Chicago
- In office May 20, 2019 – May 15, 2023
- Mayor: Lori Lightfoot
- Preceded by: Brendan Reilly
- Succeeded by: Walter Burnett Jr.

Member of the Chicago City Council from the 44th ward
- In office January 16, 2003 – May 15, 2023
- Preceded by: Bernie Hansen
- Succeeded by: Bennett Lawson

Personal details
- Born: August 22, 1955 (age 71) Chicago, Illinois, U.S.
- Party: Democratic
- Relatives: Robin Tunney (cousin)
- Education: University of Illinois, Urbana-Champaign (BA); Cornell University (MA)
- Website: Official website

Thomas M. Tunney (born August 22, 1955) is an American politician and entrepreneur from Chicago, Illinois. From 2003 to 2023, he served as an alderman on the Chicago City Council. He represented the 44th Ward of the city, which includes major tourist destinations, Northalsted and Wrigleyville neighborhoods. He was also vice mayor from 2019 to 2023.

== Education ==
Tunney was born and raised in the southwest side of Chicago. After graduating from Brother Rice, a local Catholic high school, he attended the University of Illinois where he obtained his bachelor's degree in restaurant management. Tunney succeeded in obtaining a master's degree in hotel administration from Cornell University.

== Entrepreneur ==
Returning from college, Tunney moved into the Lakeview neighborhood. Hearing that Ann Sather was retiring and closing her restaurant in Lakeview in 1981, Tunney met with Sather, offering a proposal to purchase her business. Tunney gained full ownership of the Ann Sather Restaurant and expanded it into a successful local chain.

Tunney joined several prestigious entrepreneurial circles and became chairman of the Illinois Restaurant Association. He founded and led the Lakeview Center Business Association and White Crane Wellness Center. As a result of his success, Tunney was inducted into the Chicago Gay and Lesbian Hall of Fame in 1995.

== Public service ==
Tunney opened his restaurants to grassroots and nonprofit organizations as town halls, serving as free meeting places. He committed himself to helping people with HIV and AIDS through programs he created, adopted by the Illinois Masonic Hospital. With a growing business network, Tunney became a fundraiser for local gay and lesbian political advocacy groups.

Tunney chaired the small business subcommittee of the Chicago Economic Development Committee. Mayor Richard M. Daley appointed Tunney to the mayor's Parking Task Force.

== Alderman ==
In 2002, just months before the 2003 municipal elections, 44th Ward Alderman Bernie Hansen announced that he would retire. Hansen resigned just months before the election so as to allow the mayor to appoint the replacement alderman. Mayor Richard M. Daley, with Hansen's consent, nominated Tunney to replace Hansen in December 2002. Tunney's nomination was confirmed by a 41–0 vote of the city council on January 16, 2003, and, with wide support in the Democratic Party, Tunney was elected to a four-year term as alderman on February 25, 2003. He has been re-elected four times, in 2007, 2011, 2015, and 2019.

During his campaign Tunney claimed that he would address the potential conflict of interest which would arise through his business arrangements by selling his interest in four restaurants. After being elected and sworn in, Tunney decided not to sell.

Tunney introduced an ordinance repealing Chicago's ban on foie gras in July 2007 and spearheaded passage of the repeal on May 14, 2008.

Tunney considered running for mayor in 2011, but ultimately did not.

In 2012, after arguing that allowing food trucks to operate was unfair to brick and mortar restaurants, Tunney was granted the power to write a Chicago ordinance regulating the food trucks. Critics have decried the ordinance as "designed to....halt the growth of a promising industry", and as structured to favor brick-and-mortar restaurant owners, who noted that Tunney is the owner of a brick and mortar restaurant himself.

In 2013, Tunney denied unattributed published reports that he supported moving or demolish the iconic scoreboard at Wrigley Field to clear the view for nearby rooftops owners.

Tunney has had an often adversarial relationship with the Ricketts family, current owners of the Chicago Cubs, whose stadium, Wrigley Field, is located in his ward. The Ricketts family has accused Tunney of being, "needlessly disrespectful" in negotiations with them about the redevelopment of Wrigley Field. Cubs chairman Thomas S. Ricketts has publicly criticized Tunney.

Tunney considered running for mayor in 2019, but ultimately did not. In the runoff of the election, Tunney endorsed Lori Lightfoot.

On May 17, three days prior to her inauguration as mayor, Lightfoot tapped Tunney to serve as both vice mayor and chairman of the Council's Committee on Zoning, Landmarks and Building Standards. On May 29, 2019, Tunney was formally appointed as chairman of the Council's Committee on Zoning, Landmarks and Building Standards.

In 2020 Tunney violated the State of Illinois's second indoor dining lockdown.

In August 2022, Tunney announced that he would not run for an additional term on the Chicago City Council in 2023. Tunney considered challenging Mayor Lightfoot for mayor in the 2023 Chicago mayoral election, going as far as collecting signatures for a ballot petition. However, Tunney decided not to run and ultimately endorsed Paul Vallas ahead of the election's first round. Tunney has indicated that after leaving the City Council he intends to advocate of behalf the city's business community.

== Personal life ==
Tunney is the cousin of actress Robin Tunney.

Tunney was the first openly gay Chicago Alderman.

== Electoral history ==
2003 Chicago 44th Ward aldermanic general election
Party	Candidate	Votes	%
Nonpartisan	Thomas M. Tunney (incumbent)	6,014	59.39
Nonpartisan	Rick Ingram	2,280	22.52
Nonpartisan	Dean Maragos	1,343	13.26
Nonpartisan	Karen Kennedy	296	2.92
Nonpartisan	Matthew A. Fordham	193	1.91
Total votes		10,126	100

2007 Chicago 44th Ward aldermanic general election
Party	Candidate	Votes	%
Nonpartisan	Tom Tunney (incumbent)	5,824	100
Total votes		5,824	100

2011 Chicago 44th Ward aldermanic general election
Party	Candidate	Votes	%
Nonpartisan	Thomas M. Tunney (incumbent)	11,129	100
Total votes		11,129	100

2015 Chicago 44th Ward aldermanic general election
Party	Candidate	Votes	%
Nonpartisan	Tom Tunney (incumbent)	6,126	67.06
Nonpartisan	Mark Thomas	2,153	23.57
Nonpartisan	Scott Davis	854	9.35
Write-in	Robin Cook	2	0.02
Total votes		9,135	100

2019 Chicago 44th Ward aldermanic general election
Party	Candidate	Votes	%
Nonpartisan	Tom Tunney (incumbent)	9,734	64.44
Nonpartisan	Austin Baidas	3,794	25.12
Nonpartisan	Elizabeth Shydlowski	1,577	10.44
Total votes		15,105	100

== See also ==
- List of Chicago aldermen since 1923
