= Chicago City Council Latino Caucus =

- Chair: Rossana Rodriguez-Sanchez
- Vice Chair: Carlos Ramirez-Rosa
- Secretary: Ruth Cruz
- Treasurer: Jessie Fuentes
- Founded: 2015; 10 years ago
- Seats in Chicago City Council: 14 / 50

Website
- http://www.ccclatinocaucus.org/

The Latino Caucus of the Chicago City Council is a bloc of aldermen in the Chicago City Council, composed of council members of Latino heritage and of those whose wards are majority Latino. During the 2023–2027 term, the caucus consists of 14 members out of the council's 50 aldermen, and City Clerk Anna Valencia as an ex-officio member.

== Membership ==
=== Current members ===
The following table lists current aldermen who are members of the Latino Caucus, as of April 2023.

Member	Ward	Joined
Daniel La Spata	1	2020
Peter Chico	10	2023
Julia Ramirez	12	2023
Jeylú Gutiérrez	14	2023
Michael Rodriguez	22	2019
Silvana Tabares	23	2018
Byron Sigcho-Lopez	25	2019
Jessie Fuentes	26	2023
Ruth Cruz	30	2023
Felix Cardona, Jr.	31	2019
Rossana Rodriguez-Sanchez	33	2019
Carlos Ramirez-Rosa	35	2015
Gilbert Villegas	36	2015
Andre Vasquez	40	2019

=== Past members ===
Member	Ward	Joined	Left
Raymond Lopez	15		2019; left after some caucus members endorsed his election challenger

== Agenda and actions ==
=== 2019–23 City Council term ===
During the 2019 Chicago Public Schools strike, the Latino Caucus released a statement urging Chicago Public Schools to accept the Chicago Teachers Union's demands.

During the COVID-19 pandemic, the Latino Caucus endorsed legislation calling for temporary suspension rent and mortgage payments.

== See also ==
- Chicago Aldermanic Black Caucus
- Chicago City Council Democratic Socialist Caucus
- Chicago City Council LGBT Caucus
- Chicago City Council Progressive Reform Caucus
