= 2019 Chicago aldermanic election =

2019 Chicago aldermanic elections
- February 26 and April 2, 2019

All 50 seats in the Chicago City Council 26 seats needed for a majority
	Majority party	Minority party	Third party
Party	Democratic	Democratic Socialists of America	Republican
Seats before	48 (Note: Elections in Chicago are officially nonpartisan. These numbers are for informational purposes only and based on public record.) (Note: Figure does not include the independent Nicholas Sposato of the 38th ward, who defected from the Democrats in 2017.)	1	1
Seats won	40	6	1
Seat change	▼8	▲5	Steady
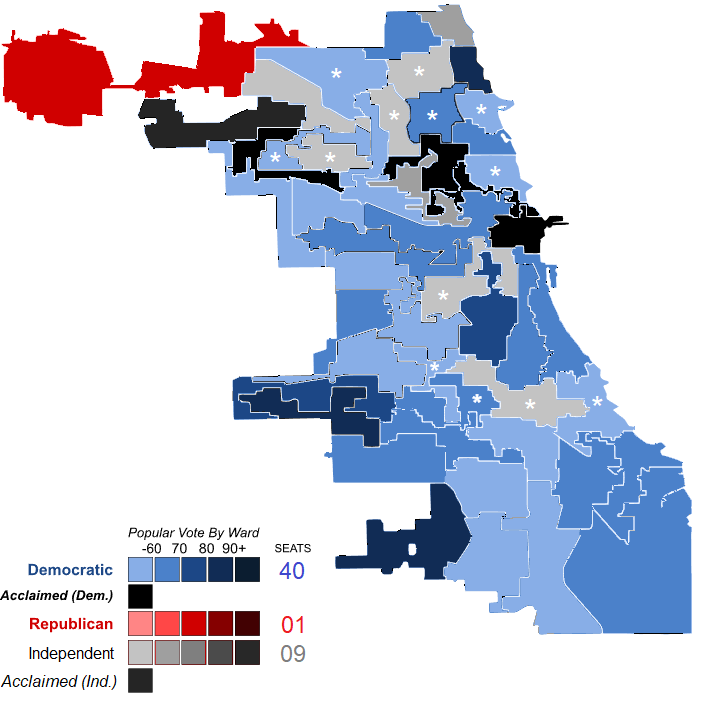
- Results by ward. An asterisk notes the necessity of a runoff election.

The 2019 Chicago aldermanic election took place in two rounds on February 26 and April 2, 2019, to elect 50 aldermen to the Chicago City Council. Each alderman represents one of Chicago's 50 wards. The elections are non-partisan and use a two-round system where the top two finishers compete in a second-round run-off if no candidate receives more than 50% of the vote in the first round. The elections were party of the 2019 Chicago elections, which included elections for Mayor, City Clerk, City Treasurer.

Of the 50 incumbent aldermen 45 ran for re-election. Incumbents did not run in the 20th, 22nd, 25th, 39th, and 47th wards. Five aldermen ran unopposed: Brian Hopkins (2nd ward), Scott Waguespack (32nd), Gilbert Villegas (36th), Brendan Reilly (42nd), and Nicholas Sposato (38th).

Three aldermen were defeated in the first round, and four more were defeated in run-off elections. There were a total of 12 new aldermen elected: Daniel La Spata (1st ward), Stephanie Coleman (16th), Jeanette Taylor (20th), Michael Rodriguez (22nd), Byron Sigcho-Lopez (25th), Felix Cardona (31st), Rossana Rodríguez (33rd), Samantha Nugent (39th), Andre Vasquez (40th), Jim Gardiner (45th), Matt Martin (47th), and Maria Hadden (49th). After the election, the council's Progressive Caucus grew from 10 to 18 members and a new 6-member Socialist Caucus was formed.

== Overview ==
=== Campaign ===
Candidates for city council are required to submit 473 valid signatures from registered voters in their ward to appear on the ballot. A total of 212 candidates submitted nominating petitions, an increase from 184 candidates in the 2015 election. However, the total number of candidates is lower than the 351 candidates in 2011, the last municipal election that, like 2019, had an open race for mayor.

In the first round, three aldermen who ran for re-election lost their seats. There were run-offs elections in 14 wards: 10 races where incumbents are running, and four races for open seats. At least three additional incumbent aldermen were defeated in run-off elections.

=== Seat changes ===
Ward	Incumbent	Incumbent status	Alderman-elect	Ref
1	Proco Joe Moreno	Defeated in general election	Daniel La Spata	
16	Toni Foulkes	Defeated in run-off election	Stephanie Coleman	
20	Willie Cochran	Retiring	Jeanette Taylor	
22	Ricardo Muñoz	Retiring	Michael Rodriguez	
25	Daniel Solis	Retiring	Byron Sigcho-Lopez	
31	Milly Santiago	Defeated in run-off election	Felix Cardona	
33	Deb Mell	Defeated in run-off election	Rossana Rodríguez Sanchez	
39	Margaret Laurino	Retiring	Samantha Nugent	
40	Patrick O'Connor	Defeated in run-off election	Andre Vasquez	
45	John Arena	Defeated in general election	Jim Gardiner	
47	Ameya Pawar	Retiring, ran unsuccessfully for City Treasurer	Matt Martin	
49	Joe Moore	Defeated in general election	Maria Hadden	

=== Election calendar ===
==== For candidates ====
Key dates for candidates
Date	Description	Statute Source
August 28, 2018	First day to circulate nominating petitions. Candidates need to submit at least 473 valid signatures from registered voters in their ward in order to appear on the ballot.	10 ILCS 5/10-4
November 19–26	Period to submit nominating petitions to the Chicago Board of Elections.	10 ILCS 5/10-6(4), 5/10-8
December 3	Last day for candidates to submit objections (also known as challenges) to other candidates' nominating petitions.	
December 20	Last day for candidates to withdraw from the election.	10 ILCS 5/10-7, 5/10-15; 65 ILCS 20/21-9
February 26, 2019	Election day, first round. Polling places are open from 6:00 am to 7:00 pm.	
March 19	Last day for Board of Elections to announce results of first-round election.	10 ILCS 5/22-17
April 2	Election day, second round run-off (as needed in each ward). Polling places are open from 6:00 am to 7:00 pm.	

==== For voters ====
Key dates for voters, for first-round elections on February 26, 2019
Date	Description	Statute Source
Indeterminate–February 25	Early voting period at designated polling places. The law requires that early voting begins 40 days prior to the election (i.e. January 17), but the Board of Elections has announced that due to ongoing nominating petition challenges, the start of early voting will be delayed.	10 ILCS 5/19A-15
January 29	Last day for regular voter registration. After this and until election day, "grace period" registration and voting will be available at designated polling places.	10 ILCS 5/6-29; 5/6-100
February 21	Last day for registered voters to apply for mail-in ballots.	10 ILCS 5/19-2
February 26	Election day, first round. Polling places are open from 6:00 am to 7:00 pm.	
March 19	Last day for Board of Elections to announce results of first-round election.	10 ILCS 5/22-17

Key dates for voters, for second-round elections on April 2, 2019
Date	Description	Statute Source
March 5	Last day for regular voter registration. After this and until election day, "grace period" registration and voting will be available at designated polling places.	10 ILCS 5/6-29, 5/6-50, 5/6-51, 5/6-53, 5/6-100
Indeterminate date–April 1	Early voting period at designated polling places. Early voting will begin once the Board of Elections certifies the results of the first-round elections and consequently confirms where second-round elections are needed. The latest possible date for certification of first-round elections is March 19, 2019.	10 ILCS 5/19A-15
March 28	Last day for registered voters to apply for mail-in ballots.	10 ILCS 5/19-2
April 2	Election day, second round. Polling places are open from 6:00 am to 7:00 pm.	
April 23	Last day for Board of Elections to announce results of second-round election.	10 ILCS 5/22-17

== North Side ==
=== 1st ward ===
Incumbent alderman Proco Joe Moreno unsuccessfully sought reelection. Moreno had been appointed alderman in 2010 by Mayor Richard M. Daley, and had subsequently been reelected in 2011 and 2015. Moreno ultimately lost reelection to his sole challenger, Daniel La Spata.

==== Candidates ====
Certified candidates
Name	Experience	Campaign	Ref
Proco Joe Moreno	Incumbent alderman	(Website)	
Daniel La Spata	Former vice president of Logan Square Neighborhood Association; Community activist	(Website) (Facebook) (Twitter)	

Two write-in candidates filed:

- Richard Benedict Mayers, perennial candidate and alleged white supremacist, write-in candidate for Chicago Mayor, City Clerk, Treasurer in 2019 congressional candidate in 2000, 2002, 2008, 2016, and 2018; 1998 State House candidate; 1993 Berwyn city clerk and city treasurer candidate
- Justin Tucker

One candidate was removed from the ballot due to insufficient nominating petition signatures:

- Justin Tucker

The following candidate filed nominating petitions but withdrew before ballot certification:

- Trevor Grant, statistician and data scientist, Illinois National Guard Veteran

==== Campaign ====
Moreno and La Spata appeared at a candidate forum hosted by Logan Square Preservation on January 8, 2019.

==== Endorsements ====
Daniel La Spata

Organizations:

- The People's Lobby
- Run for Something

Individuals:

- Will Guzzardi, State representative for Illinois' 39th district
Proco Joe Moreno

Newspapers

- Chicago Sun-Times
- Chicago Tribune
Justin Tucker write-in

Organizations

- Libertarian Party of Chicago

==== Results ====
1st Ward General election
Party	Candidate	Votes	%
Nonpartisan	Daniel La Spata	7,326	61.23
Nonpartisan	Proco Joe Moreno (incumbent)	4,635	38.74
Write-in	Justin Tucker	3	0.03
Total votes		11,964	100

=== 2nd ward ===
Incumbent first-term alderman Brian Hopkins won reelection, running unopposed on the ballot.

==== Candidates ====
Certified candidates
Name	Experience	Campaign	Ref
Brian Hopkins	Incumbent alderman		

Two write-in candidates filed:

- Richard Benedict Mayers, perennial candidate and alleged white supremacist, write-in candidate for Chicago Mayor, City Clerk, and Treasurer in 2019; congressional candidate in 2000, 2002, 2008, 2016, and 2018; 1998 State House candidate; 1993 Berwyn city clerk and city treasurer candidate
- Mollie May Brady

==== Endorsements ====
Brian Hopkins

Organizations

- Fraternal Order of Police Chicago Lodge #7
Mollie May Brady write-in

Organizations

- Libertarian Party of Chicago

==== Results ====
2nd Ward General election
Party	Candidate	Votes	%
Nonpartisan	Brian Hopkins (incumbent)	10,977	100.00
Write-in	Mollie May Brady	4	0.04
Total votes		10,981	100

=== 32nd ward ===
Incumbent third-term alderman Scott Waguespack won reelection, running unopposed on the ballot. He appeared at a candidate forum covering the Logan Square neighborhood on January 8, 2019.

==== Candidates ====
Certified candidates
Name	Experience	Campaign	Ref
Scott Waguespack	Incumbent alderman		

One write-in candidate filed:

- Richard Benedict Mayers, perennial candidate and alleged white supremacist, write-in candidate for Chicago Mayor, City Clerk, and Treasurer in 2019; congressional candidate in 2000, 2002, 2008, 2016, and 2018; 1998 State House candidate; 1993 Berwyn city clerk and city treasurer candidate

==== Endorsements ====
Scott Waguespack

Organizations

- Center for Racial & Gender Equity
- Chicago Teachers Union
- Cook County College Teachers Union

==== Results ====
32nd Ward General election
Party	Candidate	Votes	%
Nonpartisan	Scott Waguespack (incumbent)	11,519	100.00
Total votes		11,519	100

=== 40th ward ===
Incumbent ninth-term alderman Patrick J. O'Connor unsuccessfully sought reelection, being defeated by Andre Vasquez in a runoff.

==== Candidates ====
Certified candidates
Name	Experience	Campaign	Ref
Andre Vasquez	Utility company manager Community activist	(Website) (Facebook) (Twitter)	
Dianne Daleiden	Chicago Public Schools teacher Member of local school council Businesswoman	(Website) (Facebook) (Twitter)	
Maggie O'Keefe	Small business owner	(Website) (Facebook) (Twitter)	
Patrick O'Connor	Incumbent alderman	(Website)	
Ugo Okere	Former chairman of youth organization Fuerza del Sol; Local government agency employee Community organizer	(Website) (Facebook) (Twitter)	

One write-in candidate filed:

- Richard Benedict Mayers, perennial candidate and alleged white supremacist, write-in candidate for Chicago Mayor, City Clerk, and Treasurer in 2019; congressional candidate in 2000, 2002, 2008, 2016, and 2018; 1998 State House candidate; 1993 Berwyn city clerk and city treasurer candidate

==== Endorsements ====
André Vasquez

Organizations:

- Chicago Democratic Socialists of America (in the run-off election)
- Reclaim Chicago
- The People's Lobby
- ONE People's Campaign

Individuals:

- Ram Villivalam, State Senator for Illinois' 8th district
- Daniel Biss, State Senator for Illinois' 9th district
- Maria Hadden, alderwoman-elect for the 49th ward (endorsed for run-off election)
Dianne Daleiden

Organizations:

- Northside Democracy for America
- Illinois Berniecrats
- Chicago Teachers Union

Officeholders:

- Fritz Kaegi, Cook County Assessor
- David Orr, former Cook County Clerk, former alderman for the 49th ward, former acting mayor of Chicago
- Dick Simpson, professor at University of Illinois Chicago, former alderman
Maggie O'Keefe

Organizations:

- Run for Something
Ugo Okere

Organizations:

- Run for Something
- Chicago Democratic Socialists of America (in the first round)
Pat O'Connor

Organizations

- INCS Action

Newspapers

- Chicago Sun-Times
- Chicago Tribune

==== Campaigns ====
A candidate forum organized by several community organizations was scheduled on January 29, 2019.

==== Results ====
40th Ward General election
Party	Candidate	Votes	%
Nonpartisan	Patrick J. O'Connor (incumbent)	4,446	33.30
Nonpartisan	André Vasquez	2,683	20.09
Nonpartisan	Dianne Daleiden	2,296	17.19
Nonpartisan	Maggie O'Keefe	2,058	15.41
Nonpartisan	Ugo Okere	1,870	14.00
Total votes		13,353	100

40th Ward Runoff
Party	Candidate	Votes	%
Nonpartisan	André Vasquez	7,509	53.87
Nonpartisan	Patrick J. O'Connor (incumbent)	6,431	46.13
Total votes		13,940	100

=== 42nd ward ===
Incumbent third-term alderman Brendan Reilly won reelection, running unopposed on the ballot.

==== Candidates ====
Certified candidates
Name	Experience	Campaign	Ref
Brendan Reilly	Incumbent alderman		

One write-in candidate filed:

- Richard Benedict Mayers, perennial candidate and alleged white supremacist, write-in candidate for Chicago Mayor, City Clerk, and Treasurer in 2019; congressional candidate in 2000, 2002, 2008, 2016, and 2018; 1998 State House candidate; 1993 Berwyn city clerk and city treasurer candidate

==== Results ====
43rd Ward General election
Party	Candidate	Votes	%
Nonpartisan	Brendan Reilly (incumbent)	11,129	100
Total votes		11,129	100

=== 43rd ward ===
Incumbent second-term alderman Michele Smith won reelection, defeating Derek Lindblom in a runoff.

==== Candidates ====
Certified candidates
Name	Experience	Campaign	Ref
Derek Lindblom	Aide to U.S. Senator Chuck Schumer; Economic policy advisor to Mayor Rahm Emanuel; Healthcare entrepreneur	(Website) (Facebook) (Twitter)	
Jacob Ringer	Former chief of staff for Chicago's Chief Financial Officer; Former president of Lincoln Park Auxiliary Board; Lawyer	(Website)	
Michele Smith	Incumbent alderman	(Website) (Facebook) (Twitter)	
Leslie Fox	Former executive director of host committees for 1994 World Cup and 1996 Democratic National Convention; Public relations consultant	(Website) (Facebook) (Twitter)	
Rebecca Janowitz	Former coordinator for special projects for Chicago Public Schools; Lawyer, former legal services provider	(Website) (Facebook) (Twitter)	
Steve McClellan		(Facebook) (Twitter)	

One write-in candidate filed:

- Richard Benedict Mayers, perennial candidate and alleged white supremacist, write-in candidate for Chicago Mayor, City Clerk, and Treasurer in 2019; congressional candidate in 2000, 2002, 2008, 2016, and 2018; 1998 State House candidate; 1993 Berwyn city clerk and city treasurer candidate

One candidate was removed from the ballot due to insufficient nominating petition signatures:

- Matthew Roney, student at DePaul University

==== Endorsements ====
===== First round =====
Derek Lindblom

Organizations:

- Chicago Sun-Times
Michele Smith

Organizations:

- Chicago Tribune

===== Runoff =====
Derek Lindblom

Newspapers:

- Chicago Sun-Times
Michele Smith

Officeholders

- Sara Feigenholtz, State Representative
- Lori Lightfoot, former President of the Chicago Police Board and Chicago mayoral candidate in 2019
- Mike Quigley, congressman from Illinois's 5th congressional district
- Tom Tunney, 44th Ward alderman
- Scott Waguespack, 32nd Ward alderman
- Ann Williams, State Representative

Individuals

- Terry Cosgrove, activist

Newspapers:

- Chicago Tribune

==== Results ====
43rd Ward General election
Party	Candidate	Votes	%
Nonpartisan	Michele Smith (incumbent)	5,486	38.98
Nonpartisan	Derek Lindblom	3,913	27.81
Nonpartisan	Leslie Fox	1,892	13.44
Nonpartisan	Jacob Ringer	1,776	12.62
Nonpartisan	Rebecca Janowitz	681	4.84
Nonpartisan	Steven McClellan	325	2.31
Total votes		14,073	100

43rd Ward Runoff
Party	Candidate	Votes	%
Nonpartisan	Michele Smith (incumbent)	7,435	53.57
Nonpartisan	Derek Lindblom	6,444	46.43
Total votes		13,879	100

=== 44th ward ===
Incumbent fourth-term alderman Tom Tunney won reelection.

==== Candidates ====
Certified candidates
Name	Experience	Campaign	Ref
Austin Baidas	Former manager of state government agencies Former advisor at U.S. Department of Transportation; Former CEO	(Website) (Facebook) (Twitter)	
Elizabeth Shydlowski	Fundraising consultant	(Website) (Facebook) (Twitter)	
Tom Tunney	Incumbent alderman	(Website) (Facebook) (Twitter)	

The following candidate filed nominating petitions but withdrew before ballot certification:

- Patrick Shine, U.S. Air Force veteran, co-founder of non-profit This Is My Country, Inc.

One write-in candidate filed:

- Richard Benedict Mayers, perennial candidate and alleged white supremacist, write-in candidate for Chicago Mayor, City Clerk, and Treasurer in 2019; congressional candidate in 2000, 2002, 2008, 2016, and 2018; 1998 State House candidate; 1993 Berwyn city clerk and city treasurer candidate

==== Endorsements ====
Tom Tunney

Organizations:

- Chicago Tribune

==== Results ====
44th Ward General election
Party	Candidate	Votes	%
Nonpartisan	Tom Tunney (incumbent)	9,734	64.44
Nonpartisan	Austin Baidas	3,794	25.12
Nonpartisan	Elizabeth Shydlowski	1,577	10.44
Total votes		15,105	100

=== 46th ward ===
Incumbent second-term alderman James Cappleman won reelection, defeating Marianne Lalonde in a runoff by a margin of only 25 votes (0.09% of the votes cast in the runoff).

==== Candidates ====
Certified candidates
Name	Experience	Campaign	Ref
Angela Clay	Community activist	(Website) (Facebook)	
Erika Wozniak Francis	Chicago Public Schools teacher Member of Chicago Votes board of directors Community activist	(Website) (Facebook) (Twitter)	
James Cappleman	Incumbent alderman	(Website) (Facebook) (Twitter)	
Jon-Robert McDowell	Environmental developer Former aide in the U.S. House of Representatives	(Website) (Facebook) (Twitter)	
Justin Kreindler	Program director of Public Allies Chicago	(Website) (Facebook)	
Marianne Lalonde	Healthcare management consultant President of Lakeside Area Neighbors Association; Former legislative aide to U.S. Senator Sherrod Brown	(Website) (Facebook) (Twitter)	

Two write-in candidates filed:

- Joann Breivogel
- Richard Benedict Mayers, perennial candidate and alleged white supremacist, write-in candidate for Chicago Mayor, City Clerk, and Treasurer in 2019; congressional candidate in 2000, 2002, 2008, 2016, and 2018; 1998 State House candidate; 1993 Berwyn city clerk and city treasurer candidate

==== Endorsements ====
Erika Wozniak Francis

Organizations:

- Chicago Teachers Union
- Cook County College Teachers Union
- SEIU Healthcare Illinois & Indiana
- United Working Families
- Northside Democracy for America
- Run for Something
- The People's Lobby
- Our Revolution Illinois
- Teamsters Local 700
- National Association of Social Workers, Illinois Chapter
- ATU Local 241

Individuals:

- Jesús "Chuy" García, U.S. Representative for Illinois' 4th district, former mayoral candidate in 2015
- David Orr, former Cook County Clerk, former alderman for the 49th ward, former acting mayor of Chicago
- Emanuel "Chris" Welch, Illinois State Representative
- Rob Martwick, Illinois State Representative
- Bridget Gainer, Cook County Commissioner
- Brandon Johnson, Cook County Commissioner
- William "Bill" Lowry, Cook County Commissioner
James Cappleman

Officeholders

- Jan Schakowsky, U.S. Representative for Illinois' 9th district
- Mike Quigley, U.S. Representative for Illinois' 5th district
- John Cullerton, State Senator for Illinois' 6th district
- Heather Steans, State Senator for Illinois' 7th district
- Sara Feigenholtz, State Representative for Illinois' 12th district
- Greg Harris, State Representative for Illinois' 13th district

Organizations

- LGBTQ Victory Fund
- International Brotherhood of Electrical Workers Local 9
- International Union of Operating Engineers Local 399
- SEIU Local 1
- SEIU Local 73

Newspapers

- Chicago Tribune
Marianne Lalonde

Organizations:

- Run for Something
- Asian American Midwest Progressives
- Chicago Sun-Times
- Illinois Education Association
- ONE People's Campaign (for the run-off election)

Individuals:

- Lori Lightfoot, former President of the Chicago Police Accountability Board, 2019 mayoral candidate

==== Results ====
46th Ward General election
Party	Candidate	Votes	%
Nonpartisan	James Cappleman (incumbent)	6,082	44.07
Nonpartisan	Marianne Lalonde	2,494	18.07
Nonpartisan	Erika Wozniak Francis	2,324	16.84
Nonpartisan	Angela Clay	2,127	15.41
Nonpartisan	Justin Kreindler	545	3.95
Nonpartisan	Jon-Robert McDowell	229	1.66
Total votes		13,801	100

46th Ward Runoff
Party	Candidate	Votes	%
Nonpartisan	James Cappleman (incumbent)	7,079	50.09
Nonpartisan	Marianne Lalonde	7,054	49.91
Total votes		14,133	100.0

=== 47th ward ===
Incumbent second-term alderman Ameya Pawar did not seek reelection as alderman, opting to instead run (unsuccessfully) for City Treasurer of Chicago. Matt Martin was elected to succeed him, defeating Michael Negron in a runoff.

==== Candidates ====
Certified candidates
Name	Experience	Campaign	Ref
Angie Maloney	Community organizer Teacher, Musician	(Website) (Facebook) (Twitter)	
Eileen Dordek	Licensed Clinical Social Worker, Commissioner for the 10th District's Cook County Commission on Women's Issues; Board member for Personal PAC for 9 years and current board member of Equality Illinois	(Website) (Facebook) (Twitter)	
Gus Kastafaros	Restaurant manager, real estate entrepreneur, electrician	(Website) (Facebook) (Twitter)	
Kimball Ladien			
Heather Way Kitzes	Manager of Neighborhood Relations for the Chicago Cubs; Former executive director of Lakeview Chamber of Commerce	(Website) (Facebook) (Twitter)	
Jeff Jenkins	Co-founder of non-profit Midnight Circus in the Parks; Small business owner	(Website) (Facebook) (Twitter)	
Matt Martin	Civil rights attorney at the office of the Illinois Attorney General; Member of local school council at McPherson Elementary School; Co-founder of Heart of Lincoln Square Neighbors Association	(Website) (Facebook) (Twitter)	
Michael Negron	Aide to Mayor Rahm Emanuel; Former Lieutenant in the U.S. Navy; Former employee of Office of Management and Budget	(Website) (Facebook) (Twitter)	
Thomas Schwartzers	Former firefighter and law enforcement officer	(Website)	

One write-in candidate filed:

- Richard Benedict Mayers, perennial candidate and alleged white supremacist, write-in candidate for Chicago Mayor, City Clerk, and Treasurer in 2019; congressional candidate in 2000, 2002, 2008, 2016, and 2018; 1998 State House candidate; 1993 Berwyn city clerk and city treasurer candidate

==== Campaign ====
All candidates, except Kastafaros, appeared at a forum focused on education issues on January 17, 2019. All candidates, except Ladien and Schwartzers, appeared at a forum on business issues on January 24. A third forum hosted by several neighborhood Chambers of Commerce was scheduled on January 26.

==== Endorsements ====
Matt Martin

Officeholders

- David Orr, former Cook County Clerk, former alderman for the 49th ward, former acting mayor of Chicago

Organizations

- United Working Families
- ONE People's Campaign
- Northside Democracy for America
- Run for Something
- Center for Racial & Gender Equity
- The People's Lobby

Newspapers

- Chicago Tribune
Michael Negron

Officeholders

- Elizabeth Warren, U.S. Senator from Massachusetts
Eileen Dordek

Organizations

- Cook County College Teachers Union
- National Association of Social Workers - Illinois
- Chicago National Organization for Women PAC

Individuals

- Congresswoman Jan Schakowsky (IL-09)
- State Senator Heather Steans
- State Representative Ann Williams
- MWRD Commissioners Debra Shore, Josina Morita, & Kim DuBuclet

Organizations

- Run for Something

Newspapers

- Chicago Sun-Times
Thomas Schwartzers

Organizations

- Fraternal Order of Police Chicago Lodge #7

Runoff

Matt Martin

Officeholders

- David Orr, former Cook County Clerk, former alderman for the 49th ward, former acting mayor of Chicago
- Maria Hadden, alderwoman-elect for the 49th ward (endorsed for run-off election)

Organizations

- United Working Families
- ONE People's Campaign
- Northside Democracy for America
- Run for Something
- Center for Racial & Gender Equity
- The People's Lobby

Newspapers

- Chicago Tribune
Michael Negron

Officeholders

- Elizabeth Warren, U.S. Senator from Massachusetts

Newspapers

- Chicago Sun-Times

==== Results ====
47th Ward General election
Party	Candidate	Votes	%
Nonpartisan	Matt Martin	7,586	39.31
Nonpartisan	Michael A. Negron	4,126	21.38
Nonpartisan	Eileen Dordek	3,373	17.48
Nonpartisan	Jeff Jenkins	1,602	8.30
Nonpartisan	Heather Way Kitzes	931	4.82
Nonpartisan	Angela "Angie" Maloney	888	4.60
Nonpartisan	Thomas M. Schwartzers	372	1.93
Nonpartisan	Gus Katsafaros	344	1.78
Nonpartisan	Kimball Ladien	75	0.39
Total votes		19,297	100

47th Ward Runoff
Party	Candidate	Votes	%
Nonpartisan	Matt Martin	11,813	62.50
Nonpartisan	Michael A. Negron	7,089	37.50
Total votes		18,902	100.0

=== 48th ward ===
Incumbent second-term alderman Harry Osterman won reelection, defeating David Williams III, his sole challenger.

==== Candidates ====
Certified candidates
Name	Experience	Campaign	Ref
David Williams III	U.S. Navy veteran, Novelist, Medical Logistics Specialist & Former Republican candidate for U.S. Representative for Illinois' 9th District	(Website) (Facebook) (Twitter)	
Harry Osterman	Incumbent alderman	(Website)	

One write-in candidate filed:

- Richard Benedict Mayers, perennial candidate and alleged white supremacist, write-in candidate for Chicago Mayor, City Clerk, and Treasurer in 2019; congressional candidate in 2000, 2002, 2008, 2016, and 2018; 1998 State House candidate; 1993 Berwyn city clerk and city treasurer candidate

==== Endorsements ====
David Williams III

Officeholders':

- Dorothy A. Brown, Clerk of the Circuit Court of Cook County
- Anne Stava-Murray, State Representative of Illinois 81st district

Individuals:

- Simon Riberio, 2012 Democratic candidate for U.S. House of representatives – Illinois 9th
- Arthur Noah Siegel, 2018 Democratic candidate for Illinois House district 14
- Willie Wilson, American businessman & 2015/2019 Chicago Mayoral Candidate
- Shawn Walker, Construction Consultant & 2007 Aldermanic candidate for the 28th ward
- Bill Morton, president of the Rogers Park Chamber of Commerce
- Tio Hardiman, former director of CeaseFire and candidate for governor in 2014.
- Bushra Amiwala 2017 DECA award recipient for undergraduate excellence in business & 2018 Democratic primary candidate for Cook County Board of Commissioners District 13.
- Jamie Murray Real World: New Orleans (2000 season) cast member & Web entrepreneur
- Vermin Supreme, American performance artist and political activist

Organizations:

- Chicago Alliance for Animals
- Rogers Park Chamber of Commerce
- Vegan Street
- Verandas Pizza & Coffee
Harry Osterman

Organizations:

- ONE People's Campaign
- Chicago Sun-Times
- Chicago Tribune

==== Results ====
48th Ward General election
Party	Candidate	Votes	%
Nonpartisan	Harry Osterman (incumbent)	12,442	83.73
Nonpartisan	David Williams III	2,415	16.25
Write-in	Richard Benedict Mayers	2	0.01
Total votes		14,857	100

=== 49th ward ===
Incumbent seventh-term alderman Joe Moore unsuccessfully sought reelection. He was defeated by Maria Hadden, his sole challenger.

Through this election, the victor Maria Hadden made history as the first LGBTQ woman of color to be elected to Chicago's City Council.

==== Candidates ====
Certified candidates
Name	Experience	Campaign	Ref
Maria Hadden	Executive director and founder of non-profit Our City Our Voice; Founding board member of Participatory Budgeting Project	(Website) (Facebook) (Twitter)	
Joe Moore	Incumbent alderman Democratic Committeeman for the 49th ward	(Website) (Facebook) (Twitter)	

Two write-in candidates filed:

- Richard Benedict Mayers, perennial candidate and alleged white supremacist, write-in candidate for Chicago Mayor, City Clerk, and Treasurer in 2019; congressional candidate in 2000, 2002, 2008, 2016, and 2018; 1998 State House candidate; 1993 Berwyn city clerk and city treasurer candidate
- Bill Morton

Two candidates were removed from the ballot due to insufficient nominating petition signatures:

- Bill Morton, president of the Rogers Park Chamber of Commerce
- Nathan Ben Myers

==== Campaign ====
Hadden and Moore both identify as progressives, but their policy positions differ sharply on a number of issues, including policing, accepting donations from developers, use of tax-increment financing, and charter school expansion. Both candidates participated in a debate hosted at Sullivan High School on January 15, 2019. At the debate, they disagreed on a number of issues, including a freeze on new charter schools (Hadden supported one; Moore did not), funding for a new police training facility (Moore supported the ongoing proposal; Hadden did not), and use of tax-increment financing for the proposed Lincoln Yards project (Moore was in favor; Hadden was opposed).

In February 2019, a controversy emerged when two photographers alleged that the Moore campaign used their photographs in campaign advertisements without permission or attribution. Another controversy emerged late in the campaign when a Moore staffer accused a 15 year old Hadden volunteer (and former Moore intern) of espionage.

==== Endorsements ====
Maria Hadden

Organizations:

- Chicago Teachers Union
- Cook County College Teachers Union
- SEIU Local 73
- SEIU Healthcare Illinois & Indiana
- United Working Families
- Northside Democracy for America
- Reclaim Chicago
- ONE People's Campaign
- LGBTQ Victory Fund
- Jane Addams Seniors in Action
- Center for Racial & Gender Equity
- The People's Lobby
- Our Revolution Chicago
- Brand New Council
- AFSCME Council 31
- Network 49
- Indivisible Loyola
- People for the American Way
- Grassroots Illinois Action
- Indo-American Democratic Organization

Individuals:

- Jesús "Chuy" García, U.S. Representative for Illinois' 4th district, former Cook County Commissioner, former Illinois state representative, former alderman for the 22nd ward, candidate for mayor in 2015
- David Orr, former Cook County Clerk, former alderman for the 49th ward, former acting mayor of Chicago
- Danny K. Davis, U.S. Representative for Illinois' 7th congressional district
- Fritz Kaegi, Cook County Assessor
- Will Guzzardi, State representative for Illinois' 39th district
- Delia Ramirez, State representative for Illinois' 4th district
Joe Moore

Organizations:

- Chicago Sun-Times
- Chicago Tribune

==== Results ====
49th Ward General election
Party	Candidate	Votes	%
Nonpartisan	Maria Hadden	7,820	63.37
Nonpartisan	Joe Moore (incumbent)	4,514	36.58
Write-in	Bill Morton	4	0.03
Write-in	Richard Benedict Mayers	3	0.02
Total votes		12,334	100

=== 50th ward ===
Incumbent second-term alderman Debra Silverstein won reelection.

==== Candidates ====
Certified candidates
Name	Experience	Campaign	Ref
Andrew Rowlas	Former Chicago Public Schools teacher and principal Former adjunct professor Community activist	(Website) (Facebook)	
Debra Silverstein	Incumbent alderman	(Website) (Twitter)	
Zehra Quadri	Executive director of social service agency Former Cook County Grant Management Administrator; Candidate for 50th ward alderman in 2015	(Website) (Facebook)	

One write-in candidate filed:

- Richard Benedict Mayers, perennial candidate and alleged white supremacist, write-in candidate for Chicago Mayor, City Clerk, and Treasurer in 2019; congressional candidate in 2000, 2002, 2008, 2016, and 2018; 1998 State House candidate; 1993 Berwyn city clerk and city treasurer candidate

The following candidate filed nominating petitions but withdrew before ballot certification:

- Majid Mustafa

==== Endorsements ====
Andrew Rowlas

Organizations:

- Northside Democracy for America
- Cook County Green Party

Individuals:

- Lori Lightfoot, former President of the Chicago Police Board, former Assistant U.S. Attorney, candidate for mayor of Chicago in 2019
Debra Silverstein

Organizations:

- Chicago Federation of Labor
- Chicago Police Sergeants' Association
- Chicago NOW Political Action Committee
- Chicago Area Laborers' PAC
- American Middle East Voters Alliance Political Action Committee
- Planned Parenthood Illinois Action
- Gun Violence Prevention PAC
- United Hellenic Voters of America
- Chicago Sun-Times
- Chicago Tribune
Zehra Quadri

Individuals:

- Jessie White, Illinois Secretary of State

==== Campaigns ====
A candidate forum is scheduled for February 10, 2019.

==== Results ====
50th General election
Party	Candidate	Votes	%
Nonpartisan	Debra L. Silverstein (incumbent)	6,014	65.84
Nonpartisan	Andrew D. Rowlas	1,678	18.37
Nonpartisan	Zehra Quadri	1,442	15.79
Total votes		9,134	100

== Northwest Side ==
=== 26th ward ===
Incumbent alderman Roberto Maldonado won reelection. Maldonado had been first appointed by Mayor Richard M. Daley in 2009, and had subsequently been reelected in 2011 and 2015.

==== Candidates ====
Certified candidates
Name	Experience	Campaign	Ref
David Herrera	Municipal finance and development professional Small business owner	(Website) (Facebook) (Instagram)	
Roberto Maldonado	Incumbent alderman	(Website) (Facebook) (Twitter)	
Theresa Siaw	Health clinic manager Social entrepreneur	(Website) (Facebook) (Twitter)	

Two write-in candidates filed:

- Richard Benedict Mayers, perennial candidate and alleged white supremacist, write-in candidate for Chicago Mayor, City Clerk, and Treasurer in 2019; congressional candidate in 2000, 2002, 2008, 2016, and 2018; 1998 State House candidate; 1993 Berwyn city clerk and city treasurer candidate
- Mirko "Limo Mike Z" Zaplatic, Jr

Two candidates were removed from the ballot due to insufficient nominating petition signatures:

- Angee Gonzalez
- Mirko "Limo Mike Z." Zaplatic Jr.

==== Endorsements ====
David Herrera

Organizations:

- Chicago Tribune
Robert Maldonado

Organizations:

- Chicago Sun-Times

==== Results ====
26th Ward General election
Party	Candidate	Votes	%
Nonpartisan	Roberto Maldonado (incumbent)	4,431	50.53
Nonpartisan	Theresa Siaw	2,462	28.13
Nonpartisan	David Herrera	1,866	21.28
Write-in	Mirko "Limo Mike Z" Zaplatic, Jr	5	0.06
Total votes		8,764	100

=== 30th ward ===
Incumbent fourth-term alderman Ariel Reboyras won reelection, defeating Jessica Gutierrez in a runoff.

==== Candidates ====
Certified candidates
Name	Experience	Campaign	Ref
Ariel Reboyras	Incumbent alderman	(Website) (Facebook)	
Edgar Esparza	Candidate for 30th ward alderman in 2015	(Website) (Facebook) (Twitter)	
Jessica Gutierrez	Community organizer Former teacher	(Website) (Facebook) (Twitter)	

One write-in candidate filed:

- Richard Benedict Mayers, perennial candidate and alleged white supremacist, write-in candidate for Chicago Mayor, City Clerk, and Treasurer in 2019; congressional candidate in 2000, 2002, 2008, 2016, and 2018; 1998 State House candidate; 1993 Berwyn city clerk and city treasurer candidate

==== Endorsements ====
Ariel Reboyras

Organizations

- Fraternal Order of Police Chicago Lodge #7
- INCS Action

Newspapers

- Chicago Sun-Times
- Chicago Tribune
Jessica Gutierrez

Officeholders

- David Orr, former Cook County Clerk, former alderman for the 49th ward, former acting mayor of Chicago
- Maria Hadden, alderwoman-elect for the 49th ward (endorsed for run-off election)

Organizations

- Northside Democracy for America

==== Results ====
30th Ward General election
Party	Candidate	Votes	%
Nonpartisan	Ariel E. Reboyras (incumbent)	3,563	47.90
Nonpartisan	Jessica Gutierrez	3,536	47.54
Nonpartisan	Edgar "Edek" Esparza	339	4.56
Total votes		7,438	100

30th Ward Runoff
Party	Candidate	Votes	%
Nonpartisan	Ariel E. Reboyras (incumbent)	4,097	51.91
Nonpartisan	Jessica W. Gutierrez	3,795	48.09
Total votes		7,892	100

=== 31st ward ===
Incumbent first-term alderman Milly Santiago unsuccessfully sought reelection, losing to Felix Cardona, Jr. in a runoff.

==== Candidates ====
Certified candidates
Name	Experience	Campaign	Ref
Colin Bird-Martinez	Founder of 31st Ward Independent Political Organization; Local school council member Automotive analyst Community organizer	(Website) (Facebook) (Twitter)	
Felix Cardona, Jr.	Executive in local government agencies Community volunteer	(Website) (Facebook) (Twitter)	
Milly Santiago	Incumbent alderman	(Website) (Facebook) (Twitter)	

One write-in candidate filed:

- Richard Benedict Mayers, perennial candidate and alleged white supremacist, write-in candidate for Chicago Mayor, City Clerk, and Treasurer in 2019; congressional candidate in 2000, 2002, 2008, 2016, and 2018; 1998 State House candidate; 1993 Berwyn city clerk and city treasurer candidate

One candidate was removed from the ballot due to insufficient nominating petition signatures:

- Renne Chavez, candidate for 31st ward alderman in 2015

==== Endorsements ====
Colin Bird-Martinez

Organizations

- The People's Lobby
- Reclaim Chicago
- Run for Something

Newspapers

- Chicago Sun-Times
Felix Cardona

Organizations:

- Chicago Alliance for Animals* Chicago Federation of Labor
- Chicago Police Sergeant's Association
- INCS Action
- LiUNA! Chicago Laborer's District Council
- Personal PAC
Milly Santiago

Newspapers

- Chicago Tribune

Runoff

Felix Cardona

Organizations:

- Chicago Alliance for Animals* Chicago Federation of Labor
- Chicago Police Sergeant's Association
- INCS Action
- LiUNA! Chicago Laborer's District Council
- Personal PAC
Milly Santiago

Newspapers

- Chicago Sun-Times
- Chicago Tribune

==== Results ====
31st Ward General election
Party	Candidate	Votes	%
Nonpartisan	Milragos Santiago (incumbent)	2,588	40.32
Nonpartisan	Felix Cardona Jr.	2,132	33.21
Nonpartisan	Colin Bird-Martinez	1,699	26.47
Total votes		6,419	100

31st Ward Runoff
Party	Candidate	Votes	%
Nonpartisan	Felix Cardona Jr.	3,584	54.29
Nonpartisan	Milragos Santiago (incumbent)	3,017	45.71
Total votes		6,601	100.0

=== 33rd ward ===
Incumbent alderman Deb Mell unsuccessfully sought reelection. Mell had first been appointed by Mayor Rahm Emanuel in 2013, and had subsequently been reelected in 2015. She was defeated by Rossana Rodriguez Sanchez in a runoff.

==== Candidates ====
Certified candidates
Name	Experience	Campaign	Ref
Deb Mell	Incumbent alderman	(Twitter)	
Katie Sieracki	Small business executive	(Website) (Facebook) (Twitter)	
Rossana Rodriguez Sanchez	Youth educator Community activist	(Website) (Facebook) (Twitter)	

One write-in candidate filed:

- Richard Benedict Mayers, perennial candidate and alleged white supremacist, write-in candidate for Chicago Mayor, City Clerk, and Treasurer in 2019; congressional candidate in 2000, 2002, 2008, 2016, and 2018; 1998 State House candidate; 1993 Berwyn city clerk and city treasurer candidate

The following candidates submitted nominating petition signatures but withdrew before the certification process:

- Joel Zawko

==== Endorsements ====
First round

Deb Mell

Newspapers

- Chicago Sun-Times
Rossana Rodriguez-Sanchez

Organizations

- 33rd Ward Working Families
- Chicago Democratic Socialists of America
- Chicago Teachers Union
- Cook County College Teachers Union
- Reclaim Chicago
- United Working Families
Katie Sieracki

Individuals:

- Lori Lightfoot, former President of the Chicago Police Board, former Assistant U.S. Attorney, candidate for mayor of Chicago in 2019

Organizations:

- Northside DFA
- Run for Something

Newspapers

- Chicago Tribune
Joel Zawko withdrew

Organizations

- Fraternal Order of Police Chicago Lodge #7

Runoff

Deb Mell

Newspapers

- Chicago Sun-Times
- Chicago Tribune
Rossana Rodriguez-Sanchez

Organizations

- 33rd Ward Working Families
- Chicago Democratic Socialists of America
- Chicago Teachers Union
- Cook County College Teachers Union
- Reclaim Chicago
- United Working Families

==== Campaign ====
All three candidates appeared at a candidate forum hosted at Bateman Elementary School on February 7, 2019. The forum was originally scheduled for January 30 but was postponed due to the polar vortex.

==== Results ====
33rd Ward General election
Party	Candidate	Votes	%
Nonpartisan	R. Rodriguez Sanchez	4,598	42.05
Nonpartisan	Deborah L. Mell (incumbent)	4,515	41.29
Nonpartisan	Katie Sieracki	1,822	16.66
Total votes		10,935	100

33rd Ward Runoff
Party	Candidate	Votes	%
Nonpartisan	Rosanna Sanchez	5,754	50.06
Nonpartisan	Deborah L. Mell (incumbent)	5,741	49.94
Total votes		11,495	100

=== 35th ward ===
Incumbent first-term alderman Carlos Ramirez-Rosa was reelected, defeating Amanda Yu Dieterich, his sole challenger.

==== Candidates ====
Certified candidates
Name	Experience	Campaign	Ref
Amanda Yu Dieterich	Member of local school council Small business owner Community activist	(Website) (Facebook) (Twitter)	
Carlos Ramirez-Rosa	Incumbent alderman	(Website) (Facebook) (Twitter)	

One write-in candidate filed:

- Richard Benedict Mayers, perennial candidate and alleged white supremacist, write-in candidate for Chicago Mayor, City Clerk, and Treasurer in 2019; congressional candidate in 2000, 2002, 2008, 2016, and 2018; 1998 State House candidate; 1993 Berwyn city clerk and city treasurer candidate

Two candidates were removed from the ballot due to insufficient nominating petition signatures:

- Mayra Gonzalez
- Walter Zarnecki, Republican Party nominee for Cook County Board Commissioner for the 8th district

==== Endorsements ====
Amanda Yu Dietrich

Organizations:

- Chicago Tribune
Carlos Ramirez-Rosa

Organizations:

- AFSCME Council 31
- Center for Racial & Gender Equity
- Chicago Democratic Socialists of America
- Chicago Teachers Union
- Cook County College Teachers Union
- The People's Lobby
- Reclaim Chicago
- SEIU Illinois State Council (Local 1, Local 73, Healthcare)
- United Neighbors of the 35th Ward
- United Working Families

Newspapers

- Chicago Sun-Times

==== Campaign ====
Dieterich and Ramirez-Rosa appeared at a candidate forum hosted by Logan Square Preservation on January 8, 2019.

==== Results ====
35th Ward General election
Party	Candidate	Votes	%
Nonpartisan	Carlos Ramirez-Rosa (incumbent)	4,700	59.43
Nonpartisan	Amanda Yu Dieterich	3,208	40.57
Total votes		7,908	100

=== 36th ward ===
Incumbent first-term alderman Gilbert Villegas was reelected, running unopposed on the ballot.

==== Candidates ====
Certified candidates
Name	Experience	Campaign	Ref
Gilbert Villegas	Incumbent alderman		

One write-in candidate filed:

- Richard Benedict Mayers, perennial candidate and alleged white supremacist, write-in candidate for Chicago Mayor, City Clerk, and Treasurer in 2019; congressional candidate in 2000, 2002, 2008, 2016, and 2018; 1998 State House candidate; 1993 Berwyn city clerk and city treasurer candidate

==== Results ====
36th Ward General election
Party	Candidate	Votes	%
Nonpartisan	Gilbert Villegas (incumbent)	5,376	100.00
Total votes		5,376	100.0

=== 38th ward ===
Incumbent first-term alderman Nicholas Sposato was reelected, running unopposed on the ballot.

==== Candidates ====
Certified candidates
Name	Experience	Campaign	Ref
Nicholas Sposato	Incumbent alderman		

One write-in candidate filed:

- Richard Benedict Mayers, perennial candidate and alleged white supremacist, write-in candidate for Chicago Mayor, City Clerk, and Treasurer in 2019; congressional candidate in 2000, 2002, 2008, 2016, and 2018; 1998 State House candidate; 1993 Berwyn city clerk and city treasurer candidate

One candidate was removed from the ballot due to insufficient nominating petition signatures:

- Ralph Pawlikowski, higher education professional and community volunteer

==== Endorsements ====
Nicholas Sposato

Organizations

- Fraternal Order of Police Chicago Lodge #7

==== Results ====
38th Ward General election
Party	Candidate	Votes	%
Nonpartisan	Nicholas Sposato (incumbent)	9,340	100.00
Total votes		9,340	100

=== 39th ward ===
Incumbent alderman Margaret Laurino did not run for reelection. Laurino had first been appointed by Mayor Richard M. Daley in 1994, and had been reelected six times. Samantha Nugent was elected to succeed her, defeating Robert Murphy in a runoff.

==== Candidates ====
Certified candidates
Name	Experience	Campaign	Ref
Casey Smagala	Social service agency manager Member of local school councils Community volunteer	(Website) (Facebook) (Twitter)	
Joe Duplechin	Law enforcement officer U.S. Army veteran Carpenter	(Website) (Facebook)	
Robert Murphy	Democratic Committeeman for the 39th Ward; President of Forest Glen Community Association; Community organizer	(Website) (Facebook) (Twitter)	
Samantha "Sam" Nugent	Medical industry professional Local government consultant, Lawyer	(Website) (Facebook) (Twitter)	

Two write-in candidates filed:

- Mary K. Hunter
- Richard Benedict Mayers, perennial candidate and alleged white supremacist, write-in candidate for Chicago Mayor, City Clerk, and Treasurer in 2019; congressional candidate in 2000, 2002, 2008, 2016, and 2018; 1998 State House candidate; 1993 Berwyn city clerk and city treasurer candidate

The following candidates submitted nominating petition signatures but withdrew before the certification process:

- Jeffrey S. La Porte

==== Endorsements ====
First round

Joe Duplechin

Organizations

- Fraternal Order of Police Chicago Lodge #7
Robert Murphy

Organizations

- Cook County College Teachers Union
- Northside Democracy for America

Newspapers

- Chicago Sun-Times

Officeholders

- David Orr, former Cook County Clerk, former alderman for the 49th ward, former acting mayor of Chicago
Samantha Nugent

Newspapers

- Chicago Tribune

Runoff

Robert Murphy

Organizations

- Cook County College Teachers Union
- Northside Democracy for America

Newspapers

- Chicago Sun-Times

Officeholders

- David Orr, former Cook County Clerk, former alderman for the 49th ward, former acting mayor of Chicago
- Maria Hadden, alderwoman-elect for the 49th ward
Samantha Nugent

Newspapers

- Chicago Tribune

==== Results ====
39th Ward General election
Party	Candidate	Votes	%
Nonpartisan	Samantha "Sam" Nugent	4,396	33.20
Nonpartisan	Robert Murphy	3,914	29.56
Nonpartisan	Casey Smagala	3,644	27.52
Nonpartisan	Joe Duplechin	1,287	9.72
Total votes		13,241	100

39th Ward Runoff
Party	Candidate	Votes	%
Nonpartisan	Samantha "Sam" Nugent	7,469	55.97
Nonpartisan	Robert Murphy	5,876	44.03
Total votes		13,345	100.0

=== 41st ward ===
Incumbent first-term alderman Anthony Napolitano won reelection, defeating Tim Heneghan, his sole challenger.

==== Candidates ====
Certified candidates
Name	Experience	Campaign	Ref
Anthony Napolitano	Incumbent alderman	(Website) (Facebook) (Twitter)	
Tim Heneghan	Former firefighter Union organizer Former local school council member Volunteer athletic coach	(Website) (Facebook) (Twitter)	

One write-in candidate filed:

- Richard Benedict Mayers, perennial candidate and alleged white supremacist, write-in candidate for Chicago Mayor, City Clerk, and Treasurer in 2019; congressional candidate in 2000, 2002, 2008, 2016, and 2018; 1998 State House candidate; 1993 Berwyn city clerk and city treasurer candidate

==== Endorsements ====
Tim Heneghan

Newspapers

- Chicago Sun-Times
- Chicago Tribune
Anthony Napolitano

Organizations

- Fraternal Order of Police Chicago Lodge #7

==== Results ====
41st Ward General election
Party	Candidate	Votes	%
Nonpartisan	Anthony V. Napolitano (incumbent)	12,502	70.27
Nonpartisan	Tim Heneghan	5,289	29.73
Total votes		17,791	100

=== 45th ward ===
Incumbent second-term alderman John Arena unsuccessfully sought reelection. He was defeated by Jim Gardiner.

==== Candidates ====
Certified candidates
Name	Experience	Campaign	Ref
Jim Gardiner	Firefighter	(Website) (Facebook) (Twitter)	
John Arena	Incumbent alderman	(Website) (Facebook) (Twitter)	
Marilyn Morales	Manager in local government agencies Community volunteer	(Website) (Facebook)	
Robert Bank		(Website) (Facebook)	

Two write-in candidates filed:

- Richard Benedict Mayers, perennial candidate and alleged white supremacist, write-in candidate for Chicago Mayor, City Clerk, and Treasurer in 2019; congressional candidate in 2000, 2002, 2008, 2016, and 2018; 1998 State House candidate; 1993 Berwyn city clerk and city treasurer candidate
- Jose Munoz

==== Endorsements ====
John Arena

Organizations

- Center for Racial & Gender Equity
- Chicago Teachers Union
- Cook County College Teachers Union
- Northside Democracy for America
- The People's Lobby
- United Working Families

Newspapers

- Chicago Sun-Times
- Chicago Tribune
Jim Gardiner

Organizations

- Fraternal Order of Police Chicago Lodge #7

==== Results ====
45th Ward General election
Party	Candidate	Votes	%
Nonpartisan	James "Jim" Gardiner	7,570	50.92
Nonpartisan	John S. Arena (incumbent)	5,382	36.21
Nonpartisan	Marilyn Morales	1,353	9.10
Nonpartisan	Robert A. Bank	553	3.72
Write-in	Jose Munoz	7	0.05
Total votes		14,865	100

== West Side ==
=== 22nd ward ===
Incumbent alderman Ricardo Muñoz did not run for reelection. Muñoz had first been appointed by Mayor Richard M. Daley in 1993, and had been subsequently reelected six times. Michael D. Rodriguez was elected to succeed him.

==== Candidates ====
Certified candidates
Name	Experience	Campaign	Ref
Liz Lopez	Social worker, Educator; Healthcare non-profit executive Community activist	(Website) (Facebook)	
Michael Rodriguez	Democratic Committeeman for the 22nd Ward; Executive Vice Chairman of the Cook County Democratic Party; Non-profit leader, Community organizer	(Website) (Facebook)	
Neftalie Gonzalez	Business owner, Youth mentor Former police officer Candidate for 22nd ward alderman in 2011	(Facebook)	
Richard Juarez	Public health professional Community volunteer	(Facebook) (Twitter)	

One write-in candidate filed:

- Richard Benedict Mayers, perennial candidate and alleged white supremacist, write-in candidate for Chicago Mayor, City Clerk, and Treasurer in 2019; congressional candidate in 2000, 2002, 2008, 2016, and 2018; 1998 State House candidate; 1993 Berwyn city clerk and city treasurer candidate

==== Endorsements ====
Michael Rodriguez

Organizations

- Chicago Teachers Union
- Cook County College Teachers Union
- Run for Something
- United Working Families

Newspapers

- Chicago Sun-Times
- Chicago Tribune

Officeholders

- David Orr, former Cook County Clerk, former alderman for the 49th ward, former acting mayor of Chicago

==== Campaign ====
All four candidates appeared at a candidate forum at Little Village Lawndale High School on January 31, 2019.

==== Results ====
22nd Ward General election
Party	Candidate	Votes	%
Nonpartisan	Michael D. Rodriguez	3,104	63.80
Nonpartisan	Lisette "Liz" Lopez	675	13.87
Nonpartisan	Richard Juarez	610	12.54
Nonpartisan	Neftalie Gonzalez	476	9.78
Total votes		4,865	100

=== 24th ward ===
Incumbent first-term alderman Michael Scott Jr. won reelection.

==== Candidates ====
Certified candidates
Name	Experience	Campaign	Ref
Creative Scott	Business owner North Lawndale Community Newspaper board member	(Website) (Facebook)	
Michael Scott Jr.	Incumbent alderman		
Toriano Sanzone	Owner of Wolfkeeper University; Technology industry entrepreneur	(Facebook) (Twitter)	
Traci "Treasure" Johnson	Owner of Higher Level Enterprises Secretary of Midwest Community Council 76 year old non for profit Organization	Community activist (Facebook) (Twitter)	

Two write-in candidates filed:

- Patricia "Pat" Marshall Adams
- Richard Benedict Mayers, perennial candidate and alleged white supremacist, write-in candidate for Chicago Mayor, City Clerk, and Treasurer in 2019; congressional candidate in 2000, 2002, 2008, 2016, and 2018; 1998 State House candidate; 1993 Berwyn city clerk and city treasurer candidate

Two candidates were removed from the ballot due to insufficient nominating petition signatures:

- Edward Ward
- Patricia Marshall, non-profit founder and manager, community activist and organizer

One candidate filed nominating petitions but withdrew before ballot certification:

- Larry Nelson, Republican Committeeman for the 24th Ward

==== Endorsements ====
Creative Scott

Officeholders

- Dorothy A. Brown, Clerk of the Circuit Court of Cook County
Michael Scott Jr.

Organizations

- INCS Action

Newspapers

- Chicago Crusader
- Chicago Sun-Times
- Chicago Tribune

==== Results ====
24th Ward General election
Party	Candidate	Votes	%
Nonpartisan	Michael Scott, Jr. (incumbent)	3,809	59.90
Nonpartisan	Creative Scott	1,191	18.73
Nonpartisan	Traci "Treasure" Johnson	991	15.58
Nonpartisan	Toriano A. Sanzone	364	5.72
Write-in	Patricia "Pat" Marshall-Adams	4	0.06
Total votes		6,359	100

=== 25th ward ===
Incumbent alderman Danny Solis did not run for reelection. Solis had first been appointed by Mayor Richard M. Daley in 1996, and had subsequently been reelected five times. Byron Sigcho-Lopez won the race to succeed him, defeating Alex Acevedo in a runoff.

==== Candidates ====
Certified candidates
Name	Experience	Campaign	Ref
Hilario Dominguez	Community organizer Chicago Public Schools teacher	(Website) (Facebook) (Twitter)	
Alex Acevedo	Pediatric nurse Community organizer	(Website) (Facebook) (Twitter)	
Troy Hernandez	Executive Architect and Data Scientist at IBM; Volunteer Director of PERRO; Former local school council member, Pilsen Academy	(Website) (Facebook)	
Byron Sigcho-Lopez	Executive director of Pilsen Alliance; Local school council member Community activist	(Website) (Facebook) (Twitter)	
Aida Flores	Public school teacher and principal	(Website) (Facebook)	

One write-in candidate filed:

- Richard Benedict Mayers, perennial candidate and alleged white supremacist, write-in candidate for Chicago Mayor, City Clerk, and Treasurer in 2019; congressional candidate in 2000, 2002, 2008, 2016, and 2018; 1998 State House candidate; 1993 Berwyn city clerk and city treasurer candidate

==== Campaign ====
All five candidates appeared at a forum hosted by the Pilsen Law Center and the Hispanic Lawyers Association of Illinois on January 12, 2019. Two additional forums were scheduled: one hosted by the West Loop Democratic Club is scheduled on January 23, and one hosted by the Coalition for a Better Chinese American Community and other Chinatown community organizations on January 28.

==== Endorsements ====
First round

Alexander Acevedo

Organizations

- Fraternal Order of Police Chicago Lodge #7
- INCS Action
Byron Sigcho-Lopez

Organizations

- Chicago Democratic Socialists of America
- Chicago Teachers Union
- Cook County College Teachers Union
Hilario Dominguez

Organizations

- The People's Lobby

Newspapers

- Chicago Sun-Times

Officeholderes

- Jesús "Chuy" García, U.S. Representative for Illinois' 4th district, former member of the Cook County Board of Commissioners, former alderman in Chicago City Council, candidate for mayor in 2015
Troy Hernandez

Newspapers

- The Chicago Tribune

Runoff

Alexander Acevedo

Organizations

- Fraternal Order of Police Chicago Lodge #7
- INCS Action

Newspapers

- Chicago Tribune
Byron Sigcho-Lopez

Organizations

- Chicago Democratic Socialists of America
- Chicago Teachers Union
- Cook County College Teachers Union

Newspapers

- Chicago Sun-Times

==== Results ====
25th Ward General election
Party	Candidate	Votes	%
Nonpartisan	Byron Sigcho-Lopez	2,885	29.23
Nonpartisan	Alexander Acevedo	2,182	22.11
Nonpartisan	Hilario Dominguez	2,056	20.83
Nonpartisan	Aida Flores	1,912	19.37
Nonpartisan	Troy Antonio Hernandez	835	8.46
Total votes		9,870	100

25th Ward Runoff
Party	Candidate	Votes	%
Nonpartisan	Byron Sigcho-Lopez	5,224	54.20
Nonpartisan	Alexander Acevedo	4,414	45.80
Total votes		9,638	100.0

=== 27th ward ===
Incumbent sixth-term alderman Walter Burnett Jr. won reelection, defeating Cynthia Bednarz, his sole challenger.

==== Candidates ====
Certified candidates
Name	Experience	Campaign	Ref
Walter Burnett Jr.	Incumbent alderman	(Facebook) (Twitter)	
Cynthia Bednarz	Real estate professional, community volunteer	(Website) (Facebook) (Twitter)	

Three write-in candidates filed:

- Ellen Anderson Corley
- Andrea "Siri" Hibbler
- Richard Benedict Mayers, perennial candidate and alleged white supremacist, write-in candidate for Chicago Mayor, City Clerk, and Treasurer in 2019; congressional candidate in 2000, 2002, 2008, 2016, and 2018; 1998 State House candidate; 1993 Berwyn city clerk and city treasurer candidate

==== Endorsements ====
Walter Burnett Jr.

Organizations

- INCS Action

Newspapers

- Chicago Sun-Times
- Chicago Tribune

==== Results ====
27th Ward General election
Party	Candidate	Votes	%
Nonpartisan	Walter Burnett, Jr. (incumbent)	6,962	68.50
Nonpartisan	Cynthia Bednarz	3,191	31.40
Write-in	Andrea "Siri" Hibbler	11	0.11
Total votes		10,164	100

=== 28th ward ===
Incumbent second-term alderman Jason Ervin won reelection.

==== Candidates ====
Certified candidates
Name	Experience	Campaign	Ref
Beverly Miles	Public service professional U.S. Army veteran	(Website)	
Jasmine Jackson	Special education teacher		
Jason Ervin	Incumbent alderman	(Website) (Facebook) (Twitter)	
Miguel Bautista		(Website) (Facebook) (Twitter)	

Three write-in candidates filed:

- Timothy Gladney
- Justina Winfrey
- Richard Benedict Mayers, perennial candidate and alleged white supremacist, write-in candidate for Chicago Mayor, City Clerk, and Treasurer in 2019; congressional candidate in 2000, 2002, 2008, 2016, and 2018; 1998 State House candidate; 1993 Berwyn city clerk and city treasurer candidate

The following candidate submitted nominating petition signatures but withdrew before ballot certification:

- Justina L. Winfrey, education non-profit founder and manager
- Theresa Rayford

==== Endorsements ====
Jason Ervin

Newspapers

- Chicago Crusader
- Chicago Sun-Times
- Chicago Tribune

==== Results ====
28th Ward General election
Party	Candidate	Votes	%
Nonpartisan	Jason C. Ervin (incumbent)	4,954	61.20
Nonpartisan	Jasmine Jackson	1,230	15.19
Nonpartisan	Miguel Bautista	1,122	13.86
Nonpartisan	Beverly Miles	764	9.44
Write-in	Timothy Gladney	14	0.02
Write-in	Justina Winfrey	11	0.01
Total votes		8,095	100

=== 29th ward ===
Incumbent first-term alderman Chris Taliaferro won reelection.

==== Candidates ====
Certified candidates
Name	Experience	Campaign	Ref
Chris Taliaferro	Incumbent alderman	(Website) (Facebook) (Twitter)	
Dwayne Truss	Local school council member Former co-chair of Austin Community Action Council; Member of non-profit boards, Community volunteer	(Website) (Twitter)	
Zerlina Smith	Community activist Candidate for 29th ward alderman in 2015	(Website) (Facebook) (Twitter)	

One write-in candidate filed:

- Richard Benedict Mayers, perennial candidate and alleged white supremacist, write-in candidate for Chicago Mayor, City Clerk, and Treasurer in 2019; congressional candidate in 2000, 2002, 2008, 2016, and 2018; 1998 State House candidate; 1993 Berwyn city clerk and city treasurer candidate

One candidate was removed from the ballot due to insufficient nominating petition signatures:

- Gayinga Washington

==== Endorsements ====
Zerlina Smith

Officeholders

- Dorothy A. Brown, Clerk of the Circuit Court of Cook County
Chris Taliaferro

Organizations

- Center for Racial & Gender Equity
- Chicago Teachers Union
- Fraternal Order of Police Chicago Lodge #7

Newspapers

- Chicago Crusader
- Chicago Sun-Times
- Chicago Tribune

==== Results ====
29th Ward General election
Party	Candidate	Votes	%
Nonpartisan	Chris Taliaferro (incumbent)	6,235	58.72
Nonpartisan	Dwayne Truss	2,915	27.45
Nonpartisan	Zerlina A. Smith	1,469	13.83
Total votes		10,619	100

=== 37th ward ===
Incumbent alderman Emma Mitts won reelection. Mitts had first been appointed by Mayor Richard M. Daley in 2000, and had subsequently been reelected in 2003, 2007, 2011, and 2015.

==== Candidates ====
Certified candidates
Name	Experience	Campaign	Ref
Emma Mitts	Incumbent alderman	(Facebook)	
Deondre Rutues		(Website) (Facebook) (Twitter)	
Tara Stamps	Teacher; Community activist	(Facebook) (Twitter)	
Otis Percy		(Facebook)	

Three write-in candidates filed:

- Stephen Hodge
- Richard Benedict Mayers, perennial candidate and alleged white supremacist, write-in candidate for Chicago Mayor, City Clerk, and Treasurer in 2019; congressional candidate in 2000, 2002, 2008, 2016, and 2018; 1998 State House candidate; 1993 Berwyn city clerk and city treasurer candidate
- Otis Percy

==== Endorsements ====
Emma Mitts

Organizations

- INCS Action
Deondre Rutues

Newspapers

- Chicago Tribune
Tara Stamps

Officeholders

- David Orr, former Cook County Clerk, former alderman for the 49th ward, former acting mayor of Chicago

Organizations

- Chicago Teachers Union
- Cook County College Teachers Union
- United Working Families

Newspapers

- Chicago Crusader
- Chicago Sun-Times

==== Results ====
37th Ward General election
Party	Candidate	Votes	%
Nonpartisan	Emma Mitts (incumbent)	4,151	54.08
Nonpartisan	Tara Stamps	3,083	40.17
Nonpartisan	Deondre Rutues	436	5.68
Write-in	Otis Percy	5	0.07
Total votes		7,675	100

== Southwest Side ==
=== 11th ward ===
Incumbent first-term alderman Patrick Daley Thompson won reelection, defeating David Mihalyfy, his sole challenger on the ballot.

==== Candidates ====
Certified candidates
Name	Experience	Campaign	Ref
David Mihalyfy		(Website) (Twitter)	
Patrick Daley Thompson	Incumbent alderman	(Website) (Twitter)	

One write-in candidate filed:

- Richard Benedict Mayers, perennial candidate and alleged white supremacist, write-in candidate for Chicago Mayor, City Clerk, and Treasurer in 2019; congressional candidate in 2000, 2002, 2008, 2016, and 2018; 1998 State House candidate; 1993 Berwyn city clerk and city treasurer candidate

==== Endorsements ====
Daniel Mihalyfy

Organizations

- Run for Something
Patrick Daley Thompson

Organizations

- Fraternal Order of Police Chicago Lodge #7

Newspapers

- Chicago Sun-Times
- Chicago Tribune

==== Results ====
11th Ward General election
Party	Candidate	Votes	%
Nonpartisan	Patrick Daley Thompson (incumbent)	7,537	73.44
Nonpartisan	David Mihalyfy	2,726	26.56
Total votes		10,263	100

=== 12th ward ===
Incumbent fourth-term alderman George Cardenas won reelection.

==== Candidates ====
Certified candidates
Name	Experience	Campaign	Ref
Martha Rangel			
Pete DeMay	Founding member of Neighbors for Environmental Justice and 12th ward independent political organization Community organizer, Union organizer	(Website) (Facebook) (Twitter)	
George Cardenas	Incumbent alderman	(Website) (Facebook) (Twitter)	
Jose Rico	Former director of White House Initiative on Educational Excellence for Hispanics; Community activist, Teacher	(Website)	

Two write-in candidates filed:

- Samuel Alcantar
- Richard Benedict Mayers, perennial candidate and alleged white supremacist, write-in candidate for Chicago Mayor, City Clerk, and Treasurer in 2019; congressional candidate in 2000, 2002, 2008, 2016, and 2018; 1998 State House candidate; 1993 Berwyn city clerk and city treasurer candidate

Two candidates were removed from the ballot due to insufficient nominating petition signatures:

- Francisco Nunez Sr.
- Samuel Alcantar

==== Endorsements ====
George Cardenas

Organizations

- Fraternal Order of Police Chicago Lodge #7
Jose Rico

Newspapers

- Chicago Sun-Times
- Chicago Tribune

==== Results ====
12th Ward General election
Party	Candidate	Votes	%
Nonpartisan	George Cardenas (incumbent)	2,987	50.21
Nonpartisan	Pete Demay	1,019	17.13
Nonpartisan	Jose Rico	1,006	16.91
Nonpartisan	Martha Yerania Rangel	929	15.62
Write-in	Samuel Alcantar	8	0.13
Total votes		5,949	100

=== 13th ward ===
Incumbent second-term alderman Marty Quinn won reelection, defeating David Krupa, his sole challenger.

==== Candidates ====
Certified candidates
Name	Experience	Campaign	Ref
David Krupa	Freshman student at DePaul University	(Website) (Facebook) (Twitter)	
Marty Quinn	Incumbent alderman	(Website)	

One write-in candidate filed:

- Richard Benedict Mayers, perennial candidate and alleged white supremacist, write-in candidate for Chicago Mayor, City Clerk, and Treasurer in 2019; congressional candidate in 2000, 2002, 2008, 2016, and 2018; 1998 State House candidate; 1993 Berwyn city clerk and city treasurer candidate

==== Endorsements ====
David Krupa

Organizations

- Libertarian Party of Chicago

Newspapers

- Chicago Tribune
Marty Quinn

Organizations

- Chicago Teachers Union
- Fraternal Order of Police Chicago Lodge #7

Newspapers

- Chicago Sun-Times

==== Campaign ====
Krupa ran on a platform of lowering property taxes and increasing police presence in the ward. Krupa walked back comments from 2016, in which he had declared himself to be a, "day one Trump supporter" to a reporter from the Chicago Reader. Krupa received support from 2018 Republican candidate for Illinois governor, Jeanne Ives, who helped fundraise for his campaign.

Quinn had originally challenged Krupa's ballot petition. However, Quinn's campaign submitted 2,800 sworn affidavits to the Board of Elections, supposedly from residents that had claimed they never signed Krupa's petitions. This create a problem for Quinn, since Krupa had only filed around 1,700 signatures in his petition, and only 200 of those signatures overlapped with affidavits submitted by Quinn's campaign. This meant that the majority of affidavits submitted by Quinn were either falsified or fraudulent. Quinn later dropped his challenge to Krupa, meaning that Krupa would appear on the ballot. Reports arose that the FBI had opened an investigation into Quinn's affidavits. This incident also brought free publicity to Krupa's candidacy.

==== Results ====
13th Ward General election
Party	Candidate	Votes	%
Nonpartisan	Marty Quinn (incumbent)	10,759	86.04
Nonpartisan	David Krupa	1,746	13.96
Total votes		12,505	100

=== 14th ward ===
Incumbent alderman Edward M. Burke won reelection. The longest-serving member of the Chicago City Council, Burke had consecutively served twelve full terms, plus a partial term. Burke won reelection despite having had a criminal complaint filed against him by the FBI on January 2, 2019, for attempted extortion.

==== Candidates ====
Certified candidates
Name	Experience	Campaign	Ref
Edward M. Burke	Incumbent alderman		
Jaime Guzman		(Website) (Facebook) (Twitter)	
Tanya Patino	Civil engineer Social and political activist	(Website) (Facebook) (Twitter)	

One write-in candidate filed:

- Richard Benedict Mayers, perennial candidate and alleged white supremacist, write-in candidate for Chicago Mayor, City Clerk, and Treasurer in 2019; congressional candidate in 2000, 2002, 2008, 2016, and 2018; 1998 State House candidate; 1993 Berwyn city clerk and city treasurer candidate

The following candidate had submitted nominating petitions but withdrew:

- Irene Corral
- Jose Torrez, community development non-profit manager, activist, legal aid professional

==== Endorsements ====
Tanya Patino

Organizations:

- Cook County College Teachers Union
- United Working Families

Officeholders:

- Jesús "Chuy" García, U.S. Representative for Illinois' 4th district, mayoral candidate in the 2015 election
Jaime Guzman

Organizations:

- Chicago Sun-Times
- Chicago Tribune

==== Results ====
14th Ward General election
Party	Candidate	Votes	%
Nonpartisan	Edward M. Burke (incumbent)	3,917	54.24
Nonpartisan	Tanya G. Patino	2,123	29.40
Nonpartisan	Jaime Guzman	1,181	16.36
Total votes		7,221	100

=== 15th ward ===
Incumbent first-term alderman Raymond Lopez won reelection, defeating Rafa Yanez in a runoff.

==== Candidates ====
Certified candidates
Name	Experience	Campaign	Ref
Berto Aguayo	Community organizer	(Facebook)	
Joseph G. Williams	Violence interrupter	(Facebook)	
Otis Davis Jr.		(Facebook)	
Rafael Yañez	Youth non-profit manager and organizer Former police officer Former Police-Youth Mentoring Program coordinator	(Facebook)	
Raymond Lopez	Incumbent alderman	(Website) (Facebook) (Twitter)	

One write-in candidate filed:

- Richard Benedict Mayers, perennial candidate and alleged white supremacist, write-in candidate for Chicago Mayor, City Clerk, and Treasurer in 2019; congressional candidate in 2000, 2002, 2008, 2016, and 2018; 1998 State House candidate; 1993 Berwyn city clerk and city treasurer candidate

One candidate was removed from the ballot due to insufficient nominating petition signatures:

- Joel Riojas, business entrepreneur

One candidate submitted nominating petition signatures but withdrew before the certification process:

- Deborah Lane

==== Endorsements ====
Rafael Yanez

Officeholders

- David Orr, former Cook County Clerk, former alderman for the 49th ward, former acting mayor of Chicago

Organizations

- Center for Racial & Gender Equity
- Chicago Teachers Union
- Cook County College Teachers Union
- United Working Families
Raymond Lopez

Organizations

- INCS Action

Newspapers

- Chicago Sun-Times
- Chicago Tribune

==== Campaign ====
A candidate forum was scheduled on February 5, 2019.

==== Results ====
15th Ward General election
Party	Candidate	Votes	%
Nonpartisan	Raymond A. Lopez (incumbent)	2,541	49.70
Nonpartisan	Rafael "Rafa" Yanez	1,116	21.83
Nonpartisan	Berto Aguayo	833	16.29
Nonpartisan	Joseph G. Williams	413	8.08
Nonpartisan	Otis Davis, Jr.	210	4.11
Total votes		5,113	100

39th Ward Runoff
Party	Candidate	Votes	%
Nonpartisan	Raymond A. Lopez (incumbent)	3,220	59.70
Nonpartisan	Rafael "Rafa" Yanez	2,174	40.30
Total votes		5,394	100.0

=== 16th ward ===
Incumbent third-term alderman Toni Foulkes unsuccessfully sought reelection. She was defeated in a runoff election by Stephanie Coleman, whom she had narrowly defeated four years earlier.

==== Candidates ====
Certified candidates
Name	Experience	Campaign	Ref
Eddie Johnson		(Facebook) ([@Eddie16thWard Twitter])	
Jeffrey Lewis			
Kenny Doss II		(Website)	
Latasha Sanders	Community outreach coordinator Local government employee	(Website) (Facebook)	
Stephanie Coleman	Democratic Committeeman for the 16th Ward; Candidate for 16th ward alderman in 2015; Daughter of former alderman Shirley Coleman	(Website) (Facebook) (Twitter)	
Toni Foulkes	Incumbent alderman	(Website) (Facebook)	

One write-in candidate filed:

- Richard Benedict Mayers, perennial candidate and alleged white supremacist, write-in candidate for Chicago Mayor, City Clerk, and Treasurer in 2019; congressional candidate in 2000, 2002, 2008, 2016, and 2018; 1998 State House candidate; 1993 Berwyn city clerk and city treasurer candidate

==== Endorsements ====
First round

Stephanie Coleman

Organizations

- INCS Action

Newspapers

- Chicago Tribune
Toni Foulkes

Organizations

- Center for Racial & Gender Equity
- Chicago Teachers Union
Eddie Johnson III

Newspapers

- Chicago Sun-Times

Runoff

Stephanie Coleman

Organizations

- INCS Action

Newspapers

- Chicago Crusader
- Chicago Sun-Times
- Chicago Tribune
Toni Foulkes

Organizations

- Center for Racial & Gender Equity
- Chicago Teachers Union

==== Results ====
16th Ward General election
Party	Candidate	Votes	%
Nonpartisan	Stephanie D. Coleman	2,464	44.12
Nonpartisan	Toni L. Foulkes (incumbent)	1,758	31.48
Nonpartisan	Latasha M. Sanders	540	9.67
Nonpartisan	Eddie Johnson III	371	6.64
Nonpartisan	Kenny C. Doss II	364	6.52
Nonpartisan	Jeffrey L. Lewis	88	1.58
Total votes		5,585	100

16th Ward Runoff
Party	Candidate	Votes	%
Nonpartisan	Stephanie D. Coleman	3,822	66.12
Nonpartisan	Toni L. Foulkes (incumbent)	1,958	33.88
Total votes		5,780	100

=== 17th ward ===
First-term incumbent alderman David H. Moore won reelection, defeating Raynetta Greenleaf, his sole challenger.

==== Candidates ====
Certified candidates
Name	Experience	Campaign	Ref
David H. Moore	Incumbent alderman	(Website) (Facebook)	
Raynetta Greenleaf	Non-profit founder and manager Community activist	(Website) (Facebook)	

One write-in candidate filed:

- Richard Benedict Mayers, perennial candidate and alleged white supremacist, write-in candidate for Chicago Mayor, City Clerk, and Treasurer in 2019; congressional candidate in 2000, 2002, 2008, 2016, and 2018; 1998 State House candidate; 1993 Berwyn city clerk and city treasurer candidate

==== Endorsements ====
David Moore

Organizations

- Chicago Teachers Union

Newspapers

- Chicago Crusader
- Chicago Sun-Times
- Chicago Tribune

==== Results ====
17th Ward General election
Party	Candidate	Votes	%
Nonpartisan	David H. Moore (incumbent)	5,316	67.21
Nonpartisan	Raynetta Greenleaf	2,594	32.79
Total votes		7,910	100

=== 18th ward ===
Incumbent first-term alderman Derrick Curtis won reelection, defeating Chuks Onyezia, his sole challenger.

==== Candidates ====
Certified candidates
Name	Experience	Campaign	Ref
Chuks Onyezia	Lawyer, Community volunteer, Small business owner	(Website) (Facebook) (Twitter)	
Derrick Curtis	Incumbent alderman	(Facebook)	

Two write-in candidate filed:

- Richard Benedict Mayers, perennial candidate and alleged white supremacist, write-in candidate for Chicago Mayor, City Clerk, and Treasurer in 2019; congressional candidate in 2000, 2002, 2008, 2016, and 2018; 1998 State House candidate; 1993 Berwyn city clerk and city treasurer candidate
- Robert Topps, Jr.

==== Endorsements ====
Chuks Onyezia

Newspapers

- Chicago Crusader
- Chicago Sun-Times
- Chicago Tribune

==== Results ====
18th Ward General election
Party	Candidate	Votes	%
Nonpartisan	Derrick G. Curtis (incumbent)	8,050	67.32
Nonpartisan	Chuks Onyezia	3,904	32.65
Write-in	Robert Topps, Jr.	3	0.03
Total votes		11,957	100

=== 23rd ward ===
Incumbent alderman Silvana Tabares, who had been appointed by Mayor Rahm Emanuel in 2018, won reelection to a first full term, defeating Paulino Villarreal, her sole challenger.

==== Candidates ====
Certified candidates
Name	Experience	Campaign	Ref
Silvana Tabares	Incumbent alderman		
Paulino Villarreal	Business owner and manager	(Website)	

One write-in candidate filed:

- Richard Benedict Mayers, perennial candidate and alleged white supremacist, write-in candidate for Chicago Mayor, City Clerk, and Treasurer in 2019; congressional candidate in 2000, 2002, 2008, 2016, and 2018; 1998 State House candidate; 1993 Berwyn city clerk and city treasurer candidate

One candidate was removed from the ballot due to insufficient nominating petition signatures:

- Charles Hughes

==== Endorsements ====
Silvana Tabares

Organizations

- Fraternal Order of Police Chicago Lodge #7

Newspapers

- Chicago Sun-Times
Paulino Villarreal

Organizations:

- Chicago Tribune

==== Results ====
23rd Ward General election
Party	Candidate	Votes	%
Nonpartisan	Silvana Tabares (incumbent)	6,702	76.12
Nonpartisan	Paulino Villarreal	2,097	23.82
Write-in	Richard Benedict Mayers	5	0.06
Total votes		8,804	100

== South Side ==
=== 3rd ward ===
Incumbent third-term alderman Pat Dowell won reelection, defeating Alexandria Willis, her sole challenger on the ballot.

==== Candidates ====
Certified candidates
Name	Experience	Campaign	Ref
Pat Dowell	Incumbent alderman	(Website)	
Alexandria Willis	Healthcare advocate and policymaker Community activist	(Website) (Facebook) (Twitter)	

Two write-in candidates filed:

- Richard Benedict Mayers, perennial candidate and alleged white supremacist, write-in candidate for Chicago Mayor, City Clerk, and Treasurer in 2019; congressional candidate in 2000, 2002, 2008, 2016, and 2018; 1998 State House candidate; 1993 Berwyn city clerk and city treasurer candidate
- Darva Watkins

Two candidates were removed from the ballot due to insufficient nominating petition signatures:

- Lelan M. Jones
- Andre Love

==== Endorsements ====
Pat Dowell

Newspapers

- Chicago Crusader
- Chicago Sun-Times
- Chicago Tribune
Alexandria Willis

Officeholders:

- Dorothy A. Brown, Clerk of the Circuit Court of Cook County

Organizations:

- Center for Racial & Gender Equity

==== Campaigns ====
A candidate forum was scheduled on January 29, 2019.

==== Results ====
3rd Ward General election
Party	Candidate	Votes	%
Nonpartisan	Patricia "Pat" Dowell (incumbent)	9,085	69.00
Nonpartisan	Alexandria Willis	4,079	30.98
Write-in	Darva Watkins	3	0.02
Total votes		13,167	100

=== 4th ward ===
Incumbent alderman Sophia King, who had been appointed by Mayor Rahm Emanuel in 2016, won election to a first full term, defeating Ebony Lucas, her sole challenger on the ballot.

==== Candidates ====
Certified candidates
Name	Experience	Campaign	Ref
Ebony Lucas	Former teacher Former community development professional Founder of law firm representing low-income homeowners	(Website) (Facebook) (Twitter)	
Sophia King	Incumbent alderman	(Website)	

One write-in candidate filed:

- Richard Benedict Mayers, perennial candidate and alleged white supremacist, write-in candidate for Chicago Mayor, City Clerk, and Treasurer in 2019; congressional candidate in 2000, 2002, 2008, 2016, and 2018; 1998 State House candidate; 1993 Berwyn city clerk and city treasurer candidate

==== Endorsements ====
Sophia King

Organizations

- Chicago Teachers Union

Newspapers

- Chicago Crusader
- Chicago Sun-Times
- Chicago Tribune
- Hyde Park Herald

==== Results ====
4th Ward General election
Party	Candidate	Votes	%
Nonpartisan	Sophia King (incumbent)	9,178	66.10
Nonpartisan	Ebony D. Lucas	4,708	33.90
Total votes		13,886	100

=== 5th ward ===
Incumbent fifth-term alderman Leslie Hairston won reelection, defeating William Calloway in a runoff.

==== Candidates ====
Certified candidates
Name	Experience	Campaign	Ref
Gabriel Piemonte	Journalist; Community organizer	(Website) (Facebook) (Twitter)	
Leslie Hairston	Incumbent alderman	(Website)	
William Calloway	Community organizer, Anti-violence activist Community outreach organization founder	(Website) (Facebook) (Twitter)	

Two write-in candidates filed:

- Loretta Lomax
- Richard Benedict Mayers, perennial candidate and alleged white supremacist, write-in candidate for Chicago Mayor, City Clerk, and Treasurer in 2019; congressional candidate in 2000, 2002, 2008, 2016, and 2018; 1998 State House candidate; 1993 Berwyn city clerk and city treasurer candidate

One candidate was removed from the ballot due to insufficient nominating petition signatures:

- Shelly Quiles, social worker, psychotherapist, educator

==== Endorsements ====
First round

William Calloway

Newspapers

- Chicago Crusader
Gabriel Piemonte

Newspapers

- Chicago Sun-Times
- Chicago Tribune
- Hyde Park Herald
Leslie Hairston

Officeholders

- Barbara Flynn Currie, former Illinois House of Representatives Majority Leader

Organizations

- Chicago Teachers Union

Runoff

William Calloway

Newspapers

- Chicago Crusader
- Chicago Tribune
Leslie Hairston

Officeholders

- Barbara Flynn Currie, former Illinois House of Representatives Majority Leader

Organizations

- Chicago Teachers Union

Newspapers

- Chicago Sun-Times
- Hyde Park Herald

==== Results ====
5th Ward General election
Party	Candidate	Votes	%
Nonpartisan	Leslie A. Hairston (incumbent)	6,284	48.51
Nonpartisan	William Calloway	3,464	26.74
Nonpartisan	Gabriel Piemonte	3,205	24.74
Write-in	Loretta Lomax	1	0.01
Total votes		12,954	100

5th Ward Runoff
Party	Candidate	Votes	%
Nonpartisan	Leslie A. Hairston (incumbent)	6,849	50.65
Nonpartisan	William Calloway	6,673	49.35
Total votes		13,522	100.0

=== 6th ward ===
Incumbent second-term alderman Roderick Sawyer won reelection, defeating Deborah A. Foster-Bonner in a runoff.

==== Candidates ====
Certified candidates
Name	Experience	Campaign	Ref
Roderick Sawyer	Incumbent alderman	(Twitter)	
Deborah Foster-Bonner	Business owner Block club president, Community organizer	(Website) (Facebook) (Twitter)	
Richard Wooten	Candidate for 6th ward alderman in 2015	(Twitter)	

Two write-in candidates filed:

- LaTanya Gooden
- Richard Benedict Mayers, perennial candidate and alleged white supremacist, write-in candidate for Chicago Mayor, City Clerk, and Treasurer in 2019; congressional candidate in 2000, 2002, 2008, 2016, and 2018; 1998 State House candidate; 1993 Berwyn city clerk and city treasurer candidate

==== Endorsements ====
Roderick Sawyer

Organizations:

- Chicago Teachers Union
- Center for Racial & Gender Equity
Deborah Foster-Bonner

Organizations:

- Chicago Crusader
- Chicago Sun-Times
- Chicago Tribune

==== Results ====
6th Ward General election
Party	Candidate	Votes	%
Nonpartisan	Roderick T. Sawyer (incumbent)	5,053	49.94
Nonpartisan	Deborah A. Foster-Bonner	3,159	31.22
Nonpartisan	Richard A. Wooten	1,900	18.78
Write-in	LaTanya Gooden	7	0.07
Total votes		10,119	100

6th Ward Runoff
Party	Candidate	Votes	%
Nonpartisan	Roderick T. Sawyer (incumbent)	5,966	53.67
Nonpartisan	Deborah A. Foster-Bonner	5,151	46.33
Total votes		11,117	100

=== 7th ward ===
Incumbent first-term alderman Gregory Mitchell won reelection.

==== Candidates ====
Certified candidates
Name	Experience	Campaign	Ref
Charles Kyle	Host of community discussion forum Community volunteer Program director for a youth agency	(Website) (Facebook)	
Gregory Mitchell	Incumbent alderman	(Website)	
Jedidiah Brown		(Facebook) (Twitter)	

Two write-in candidates filed:

- Kim Curtis
- Richard Benedict Mayers, perennial candidate and alleged white supremacist, write-in candidate for Chicago Mayor, City Clerk, and Treasurer in 2019; congressional candidate in 2000, 2002, 2008, 2016, and 2018; 1998 State House candidate; 1993 Berwyn city clerk and city treasurer candidate

Two candidates were removed from the ballot due to insufficient nominating petition signatures:

- Kim Curtis
- Sharon Lewis, community organizer, consultant

==== Endorsements ====
Jedidiah Brown

Officeholders:

- Dorothy A. Brown, Clerk of the Circuit Court of Cook County
Gregory Mitchell

Organizations:

- Chicago Sun-Times
- Chicago Tribune

==== Results ====
7th Ward General election
Party	Candidate	Votes	%
Nonpartisan	Gregory I. Mitchell (incumbent)	6,684	66.30
Nonpartisan	Jedidiah L. Brown	2,100	20.83
Nonpartisan	Charles Kyle	1,294	12.83
Write-in	Kim Curtis	4	0.04
Total votes		10,082	100

=== 8th ward ===
Incumbent alderman Michelle A. Harris won reelection. Harris had first been appointed alderman in 2006 by Mayor Richard M. Daley, and had subsequently been reelected in 2007, 2011, and 2015.

==== Candidates ====
Certified candidates
Name	Experience	Campaign	Ref
Faheem Shabazz		(Facebook)	
Jewel Easterling-Smith		(Website) (Facebook)	
Linda Hudson	Community volunteer Former manager at accounting, finance, non-profit, private equity and telecommunications firms	(Website) (Facebook)	
Michelle A. Harris	Incumbent alderman	(Website) (Twitter)	

One write-in candidate filed:

- Richard Benedict Mayers, perennial candidate and alleged white supremacist, write-in candidate for Chicago Mayor, City Clerk, and Treasurer in 2019; congressional candidate in 2000, 2002, 2008, 2016, and 2018; 1998 State House candidate; 1993 Berwyn city clerk and city treasurer candidate

Two candidates were removed from the ballot due to insufficient nominating petition signatures:

- Dionte Lawrence
- Sherri Bolling, community volunteer, researcher

==== Endorsements ====
Jewel Easterling-Smith

Officeholders

- Dorothy A. Brown, Clerk of the Circuit Court of Cook County
Faheem Shabazz

Newspapers

- Chicago Tribune
Michelle Harris

Newspapers

- Chicago Crusader
- Chicago Sun-Times

==== Results ====
8th Ward General election
Party	Candidate	Votes	%
Nonpartisan	Michelle A. Harris (incumbent)	8,723	64.35
Nonpartisan	Linda Hudson	2,356	17.38
Nonpartisan	Faheem Shabazz	1,385	10.22
Nonpartisan	Jewel Easterling-Smith	1,091	8.05
Total votes		13,555	100

=== 9th ward ===
Incumbent fifth-term alderman Anthony Beale won reelection.

==== Candidates ====
Certified candidates
Name	Experience	Campaign	Ref
Anthony Beale	Incumbent alderman		
Cleopatra Watson	Community organizer	(Website) (Facebook)	
Essie Hall			
Paul Collins		(Website) (Facebook)	

Three write-in candidates filed:

- Marcia Brown-Williams, Chicago Public Schools teacher, assistant director of Quest Center and Chicago Teachers Union
- Richard Benedict Mayers, perennial candidate and alleged white supremacist, write-in candidate for Chicago Mayor, City Clerk, and Treasurer in 2019; congressional candidate in 2000, 2002, 2008, 2016, and 2018; 1998 State House candidate; 1993 Berwyn city clerk and city treasurer candidate
- Rachel Williams

One candidate was removed from the ballot due to insufficient nominating petition signatures:

- Marcia Brown-Williams, Chicago Public Schools teacher, assistant director of Quest Center and Chicago Teachers Union

One candidate submitted nominating petitions but withdrew before ballot certification:

- Rachel Williams

==== Endorsements ====
Anthony Beale

Organizations:

- Chicago Sun-Times
- Chicago Tribune
Cleopatra Watson

Officeholders:

- Dorothy A. Brown, Clerk of the Circuit Court of Cook County

Organizations:

- Cook County College Teachers Union
- United Working Families
- The People's Lobby

==== Campaign ====
A candidate forum was scheduled on January 26, 2019, at the Altgeld Murray Community Center.

==== Results ====
9th Ward General election
Party	Candidate	Votes	%
Nonpartisan	Anthony A. Beale (incumbent)	6,773	59.25
Nonpartisan	Cleopatra Watson	2,949	25.80
Nonpartisan	Paul Collins	938	8.21
Nonpartisan	Essie Hall	763	6.67
Write-in	Marcia Brown-Williams	6	0.05
Write-in	Rachel Williams	2	0.02
Total votes		11,431	100

=== 10th ward ===
First-term incumbent Susie Sadlowski Garza won reelection, defeating Robert "Bobby" Loncar, her sole challenger.

==== Candidates ====
Certified candidates
Name	Experience	Campaign	Ref
Susie Sadlowski Garza	Incumbent alderman	(Website) (Facebook) (Twitter)	
Robert "Bobby" Loncar	President of East Side Chamber of Commerce; Lawyer, Community volunteer	(Website) (Facebook)	

One candidate was removed from the ballot due to insufficient nominating petition signatures:

- Yessenia Carreón, community activist

==== Endorsements ====
Susan Sadlowski Garza

Organizations:

- Cook County College Teachers Union
- United Working Families
- Chicago Teachers Union
- The People's Lobby
- Center for Racial & Gender Equity
- Chicago Sun-Times
Robert "Bobby" Loncar

Organizations:

- Chicago Tribune

==== Results ====
10th Ward General election
Party	Candidate	Votes	%
Nonpartisan	Susie Sadlowski Garza (incumbent)	5,773	68.62
Nonpartisan	Bobby Loncar	2,640	31.38
Total votes		8,413	100

=== 19th ward ===
Second-term incumbent Matthew O'Shea won reelection, defeating David Dewar, his sole challenger on the ballot.

==== Candidates ====
Certified candidates
Name	Experience	Campaign	Ref
Matthew O'Shea	Incumbent alderman	(Website) (Facebook) (Twitter)	
David Dewar			

One write-in candidate filed:

- Richard Benedict Mayers, perennial candidate and alleged white supremacist, write-in candidate for Chicago Mayor, City Clerk, and Treasurer in 2019; congressional candidate in 2000, 2002, 2008, 2016, and 2018; 1998 State House candidate; 1993 Berwyn city clerk and city treasurer candidate

==== Endorsements ====
Matt O'Shea

Organizations

- Fraternal Order of Police Chicago Lodge #7

Newspapers

- Chicago Sun-Times
- Chicago Tribune

==== Results ====
16th Ward General election
Party	Candidate	Votes	%
Nonpartisan	Matthew O'Shea (incumbent)	17,654	85.24
Nonpartisan	David Dewar	3,056	14.76
Total votes		20,710	100

=== 20th ward ===
Incumbent third-term alderman Willie Cochran did not run for reelection. Jeanette Taylor was elected to succeed him, defeating Nicole J. Johnson in a runoff.

==== Candidates ====
Certified candidates
Name	Experience	Campaign	Ref
Andre Smith	Community activist Candidate for 20th ward alderman in 2010; Business owner	(Website) (Facebook)	
Anthony Driver Jr.	Community advocate Former policy lobbyist in Washington, DC	(Website) (Facebook) (Twitter)	
Dernard Newell	Former Assistant State's Attorney; Former chaplain and pastor Former university professor	(Website) (Facebook) (Twitter)	
Jeanette Taylor	Community organizer and activist	(Website) (Facebook)	
Jennifer Maddox	Employee of Office of Community Affairs in the Chicago Police Department; Founder of youth education non-profit	(Website) (Facebook)	
Kevin Bailey	Democratic Committeeman of the 20th ward Community volunteer and activist	(Website) (Facebook) (Twitter)	
Maya Hodari		(Website) (Facebook) (Twitter)	
Nicole Johnson	Youth educator Policy and program manager for Chicago Votes; Board member of Chicago Metro YMCA Associate Board	(Website) (Facebook)	
Quandra Speights		(Website) (Facebook)	

Two write-in candidates filed:

- Richard Benedict Mayers, perennial candidate and alleged white supremacist, write-in candidate for Chicago Mayor, City Clerk, and Treasurer in 2019; congressional candidate in 2000, 2002, 2008, 2016, and 2018; 1998 State House candidate; 1993 Berwyn city clerk and city treasurer candidate
- Mareo Phillips

Six candidates were removed from the ballot due to insufficient nominating petition signatures:

- Cassius Rudolph
- Charles Hilliard
- Clifton Pierce
- Kimetha Hill
- Matthew Johnson
- Sheila Scott

==== Endorsements ====
First round

Maya Hodari

Newspapers

- Chicago Sun-Times
- Chicago Tribune
Jennifer Maddox

Newspapers

m
Jeanette Taylor

Organizations

- Chicago Democratic Socialists of America
- Chicago Teachers Union
- Cook County College Teachers Union
- The People's Lobby
- United Working Families

Runoff

Jeanette Taylor

Organizations

- Chicago Democratic Socialists of America
- Chicago Teachers Union
- Cook County College Teachers Union
- The People's Lobby
- United Working Families

Newspapers

- Chicago Crusader
- Chicago Sun-Times
- Chicago Tribune

==== Results ====
20th Ward General election
Party	Candidate	Votes	%
Nonpartisan	Jeanette B. Taylor	2,154	28.78
Nonpartisan	Nicole J. Johnson	1,644	21.97
Nonpartisan	Kevin M. Bailey	1,211	16.18
Nonpartisan	Maya Hodari	701	9.37
Nonpartisan	Andre Smith	600	8.02
Nonpartisan	Anthony Driver, Jr.	486	6.49
Nonpartisan	Jennifer O. Maddox	460	6.15
Nonpartisan	Quandra V. Speights	157	2.10
Nonpartisan	Dernard D. Newell	71	0.95
Total votes		7,484	100

20th Ward Runoff
Party	Candidate	Votes	%
Nonpartisan	Jeanette B. Taylor	4,557	59.71
Nonpartisan	Nicole J. Johnson	3,075	40.29
Total votes		7,632	100

=== 21st ward ===
Incumbent fourth-term alderman Howard Brookins won reelection, defeating Marvin McNeil in a runoff.

==== Candidates ====
Certified candidates
Name	Experience	Campaign	Ref
Howard Brookins	Incumbent alderman	(Facebook)	
Joseph Ziegler		(Website) (Facebook)	
Marvin McNeil	Former Democratic Committeeman for the 6th ward Candidate for 21st ward alderman in 2015; Former block club president, Community volunteer	(Website) (Facebook)	
Patricia Foster			

Two write-in candidates filed:

- Richard Benedict Mayers, perennial candidate and alleged white supremacist, write-in candidate for Chicago Mayor, City Clerk, and Treasurer in 2019; congressional candidate in 2000, 2002, 2008, 2016, and 2018; 1998 State House candidate; 1993 Berwyn city clerk and city treasurer candidate
- Bonnie Poole "Granny"

One candidate was removed from the ballot due to insufficient nominating petition signatures:

- Julius Modeliste

==== Endorsements ====
Howard Brookins

Organizations

- INCS Action

Newspapers

- Chicago Sun-Times
Marvin McNeil

Newspapers

- Chicago Crusader
- Chicago Tribune
Joseph Ziegler

Officeholders

- Dorothy A. Brown, Clerk of the Circuit Court of Cook County

==== Results ====
21st Ward General election
Party	Candidate	Votes	%
Nonpartisan	Howard B. Brookins Jr. (incumbent)	5,700	45.82
Nonpartisan	Marvin McNeil	3,143	25.27
Nonpartisan	Patricia A. Foster	2,382	19.15
Nonpartisan	Joseph C. Ziegler, Jr.	1,215	9.77
Total votes		12,440	100

21st Ward Runoff
Party	Candidate	Votes	%
Nonpartisan	Howard B. Brookins Jr. (incumbent)	7,183	53.30
Nonpartisan	Marvin McNeil	6,294	46.70
Total votes		13,477	100

=== 34th ward ===
Incumbent alderman Carrie Austin won reelection, defeating Preston Brown Jr., her sole challenger on the ballot. She had first been appointed alderman by Mayor Richard M. Daley in 1994, and had subsequently been reelected to six consecutive subsequent terms before this.

==== Candidates ====
Certified candidates
Name	Experience	Campaign	Ref
Carrie Austin	Incumbent alderman	(Facebook)	
Preston Brown Jr.	Former candidate for Illinois House 27th district Former professional in consumer finance, telecommunications, and securities industries Lawyer	(Website) (Facebook) (Twitter)	

Four write-in candidates filed:

- Donna M. Johnson
- Richard Benedict Mayers, perennial candidate and alleged white supremacist, write-in candidate for Chicago Mayor, City Clerk, and Treasurer in 2019; congressional candidate in 2000, 2002, 2008, 2016, and 2018; 1998 State House candidate; 1993 Berwyn city clerk and city treasurer candidate
- Tamara McCullough AKA Tamar Manasseh, write-in candidate for mayor in 2019
- Paris Walker Thomas

==== Endorsements ====
Carrie Austin

Organizations

- INCS Action

Newspapers

- Chicago Sun-Times
Preston Brown Jr.

Newspapers

- Chicago Crusader
- Chicago Tribune

==== Results ====
34th Ward General election
Party	Candidate	Votes	%
Nonpartisan	Carrie Austin (incumbent)	6,306	54.31
Nonpartisan	Preston Brown Jr.	5,294	45.59
Write-in	Paris Walker Thomas	8	0.07
Write-in	Donna M. Johnson	4	0.03
Total votes		11,612	100

== See also ==
- Chicago aldermanic elections, 2015
- Chicago mayoral election, 2019
- United States elections, 2019
- List of Chicago aldermen since 1923
