= Ricardo Muñoz =

American politician

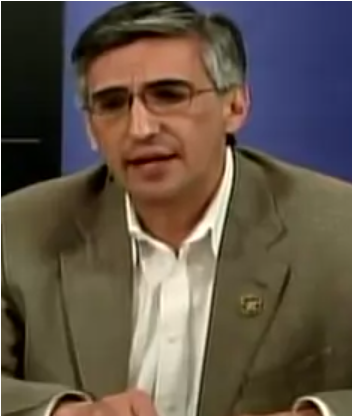

Member of the Chicago City Council from the 22nd Ward
- In office January 1993 – May 20, 2019
- Preceded by: Jesús "Chuy" García
- Succeeded by: Michael Rodriguez

Personal details
- Born: 1965 (age 60–61) Monterrey, Nuevo León, Mexico
- Party: Democratic
- Spouse: Betty Torres-Munoz
- Children: Two
- Education: Northern Illinois University (BA)
- Profession: Politician

Ricardo Muñoz is a former member of the Chicago City Council, having served as alderman for the 22nd ward, which includes Little Village and Archer Heights. Muñoz was appointed to this position by Mayor Richard M. Daley in 1993 and served until 2019. He was the longest tenured Latino and fourth longest tenured member of the Chicago City Council.

== Early and personal life ==
Ricardo Muñoz was born in Monterrey, Mexico. His family immigrated to the United States and settled on the Near West Side of Chicago. The family later moved to Little Village where he and his wife Betty currently own a home. During his teenage years, he was arrested three times and pleaded guilty to two weapons violations and one charge of cocaine possession. Each time he was given a year of court supervision. He later graduated high school and earned a bachelor's degree in political science at Northern Illinois University.

== Chicago City Council (1993–2019) ==
Muñoz was first appointed as alderman for the 22nd ward by Mayor Richard M. Daley in 1993, to replace his mentor Jesús "Chuy" García, who joined the Illinois Senate. Muñoz was the youngest member of the City Council when he first joined the body in 1993. "Alderman Ricardo Muñoz is one of the few independents on the City Council who isn't afraid to speak out against the mayor when he sees fit," wrote the Chicago Tribune in endorsing Muñoz for re-election in February 2003. "He has presented a number of innovative ideas... a terrific choice for voters."

As of June 9, 2018, Muñoz sat on the following committees: Budget and Government Operations; Committees, Rules and Ethics; Education and Child Development; Finance; Human Relations; Public Safety; and Council Office of Financial Analysis Oversight. He was a founding member of the Progressive Reform Coalition and the Latino Caucus.

On August 2, 2010, Muñoz took the unusual step of admitting that he was an alcoholic just six months before standing for re-election.

Muñoz endorsed Chris Kennedy in the 2018 Democratic gubernatorial primary.

Muñoz did not run for reelection in the 2019 Chicago aldermanic elections. He considered running in the 2019 Chicago mayoral election after Rahm Emanuel announced he would not seek reelection, but ultimately did not.

== Controversies ==
In August 2009, Muñoz acknowledged that he called Whitney Young High School's principal Joyce Kenner to find a spot for his daughter whose test scores were not sufficient for admission.

In January 2019, Muñoz was arrested and charged with misdemeanor domestic battery, stemming from an incident with his wife on New Year's Eve. In an order of protection filed with Cook County Domestic Violence Court, Betty Torres-Muñoz alleges an intoxicated Muñoz grabbed and pushed her, causing injury to her head, back, and left arm, and that she feared for her well being. He pleaded not guilty to the charges, and was acquitted in June 2019.

In April 2019, reports emerged that Muñoz had spent nearly $37,000 from the funds of the City Council Progressive Reform Caucus' political action committee (PAC), for which he had served as the treasurer, on "questionable" expenditures including $13,000 paid to himself. Caucus members reported that the discrepancy had been discovered in January and reported to the state board of elections and the Cook County State's Attorney. Muñoz claimed that the incident was a "misunderstanding" and that he would pay back the funds. In April 2021, Muñoz was indicted by federal prosecutors on 15 counts of wire fraud and one count of money laundering related to the use of Caucus PAC funds between October 2016 and June 2020 and pleaded not guilty to the charges. In September 2021, he changed his plea to guilty on one charge of wire fraud and one charge of money laundering in a plea agreement. In March 2022, he was sentenced to 13 months in prison, 18 months probation and ordered to pay $6,000 in restitution.

On August 15, 2024, he was sentenced to serve 7 more months in prison after violating his parole for driving while intoxicated in May 2024, three months after he had been released from prison.
