= Democratic Socialist Caucus =

Democratic Socialist Caucus may refer to:

- Chicago City Council Democratic Socialist Caucus, a Democratic Socialists of America caucus on the Chicago City Council

== See also ==
- Democratic socialism
