= Chicago City Council Democratic Socialist Caucus =

Democratic Socialist Caucus
- Chair: Carlos Ramirez-Rosa
- Founded: 2019; 7 years ago
- Ideology: Democratic socialism
- Political position: Left-wing
- Seats in Chicago City Council: 6 / 50

The Democratic Socialist Caucus of the Chicago City Council (DSC) is a bloc of aldermen in the Chicago City Council. The block was unofficially organized as the Socialist Caucus in 2019, and later organized as a formal caucus with its current name in 2021. It currently has six members, out of the 50 aldermen that comprise the Council. Members of the caucus identify as democratic socialists. All current members of the caucus are also members of the Chicago Democratic Socialists of America (Chicago DSA).

== History ==
The caucus was initially organized as the Socialist Caucus following the 2019 Chicago aldermanic election by six aldermen, all of whom were members of the Chicago chapter of Democratic Socialists of America. All six members also joined the larger Progressive Reform Caucus. The two caucuses pursue similar policy goals, but the Socialist Caucus' stated goal is to push a wider and more aggressive range of left-wing policies. When asked about the distinction between the two caucuses in a July 2019 interview, Carlos Ramirez-Rosa provided the example of a municipal takeover of the electric utility company ComEd as one distinctive policy that the Socialist Caucus would pursue. The caucus also supported a Just Cause for Eviction ordinance as one of its core priorities.

During the COVID-19 pandemic in Illinois, members of the caucus called for a wide-ranging recovery package including an paid emergency leave, emergency housing, an end to ICE check-ins, and weekly payments to workers and families. During the George Floyd protests, the caucus called for cutting funding to the Chicago Police Department and increasing funding for programs such as substance-abuse treatment, mental health care and after-school programs.

On May 1, 2021, five members of the group formally organized as the Democratic Socialist Caucus, with Ramirez-Rosa serving as the chair.

== Membership ==
The following table lists aldermen affiliated with the caucus.

Member	Party (Note: Aldermanic elections are officially nonpartisan; party affiliations are informational only.)	Ward	Main Community areas	First elected	Joined	Left
Daniel La Spata	Democratic	1	West Town, Logan Square	2019	2019	
Jeanette Taylor	Democratic	20	New City, Woodlawn, Englewood	2019	2019	
Byron Sigcho-Lopez	Democratic	25	Lower West Side, Near West Side	2019	2019	
Rossana Rodriguez-Sanchez	Democratic	33	Irving Park, Avondale, Albany Park	2019	2019	
Carlos Ramirez-Rosa	Democratic	35	Logan Square, Avondale, Hermosa	2015	2019	2025
Anthony Quezada	Democratic	35	Logan Square, Avondale, Hermosa	2025 (Note: Appointed, not elected.)	2025	
Andre Vasquez	Democratic	40	Lincoln Square, West Ridge, Edgewater	2019	2019	2021
Angela Clay	Democratic	46	Uptown, Lake View	2023	2023	

Andre Vasquez was part of the unofficial caucus in 2019, but was not part of the official caucus membership in 2021. In 2020, Vasquez voted for Mayor Lori Lightfoot's budget, for which he was censured by Chicago DSA, who claimed Vasquez "sided with an austerity regime and the Democratic Party establishment over the interests of Chicago's working class." Vasquez shifted away from DSA and now co-chairs the Chicago City Council Progressive Reform Caucus.

In April 2025, Carlos Ramirez-Rosa left the Chicago City Council to be the General Superintendent and CEO of the Chicago Park District. Anthony Quezada was appointed to their seat.

== See also ==
- Chicago City Council Progressive Reform Caucus
- Chicago Democratic Socialists of America
- New York State Socialists in Office
- List of Democratic Socialists of America who have held office in the United States
