= Patrick J. O'Connor =

American politician (born 1955)

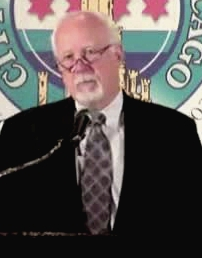
- O'Connor in 2011

Chicago Alderman from the 40th Ward
- In office May 1983 – May 2019
- Preceded by: Ivan Rittenberg
- Succeeded by: Andre Vasquez

Personal details
- Born: June 21, 1954 (age 72) Chicago, Illinois
- Party: Democratic
- Spouse: Barbara O'Connor (m. 1979)
- Education: Loyola University (B.A.); Loyola University (J.D.)
- Profession: Alderman

Patrick J. O'Connor (born June 21, 1955) is a former Chicago politician. He is the former alderman in Chicago's City Council representing the 40th ward on the North Side of the city. He was first elected in 1983 at age 28, and was re-elected eight times before losing to Andre Vasquez in 2019. O'Connor was an unsuccessful candidate in the Democratic Party primary election in the 2009 Illinois's 5th congressional district special election.

== Early life ==
O'Connor is the son of a Deputy Commissioner of the Department of Streets and Sanitation, Bureau of Equipment Services, under Chicago Mayor Richard J. Daley.

O'Connor graduated from Loyola University of Chicago School of Law in 1979. Fresh from law school, O'Connor successfully sued the city for back pay for his father after Mayor Jane Byrne fired him.

== Chicago City Council (1983–2019) ==
O'Connor was first elected alderman for the 40th ward in 1983. He was subsequently reelected eight times, in 1987, 1991, 1995, 1999, 2003, 2007, 2011, and 2015. In 2019, he was denied a tenth term on the City Council, being unseated by challenger Andre Vasquez.

=== Council Wars ===
During the tenure of Mayor Harold Washington, who was black, O'Connor, who is white, caucused with the mostly-white opposition block in City Council known as the "Vrdolyak 29". O'Connor chaired the City Council's Committee on Education as a freshman alderman.

=== Investigations and controversies ===
In his first term, a federal grand jury investigated O'Connor for providing, in late 1983 and again in late 1984, year-end jobs on the Education Committee staff for fifteen persons, including his mother-in-law, his brother-in-law, his sister-in-law, wives of two former members of his law firm, and the wife of a former staff aide. Some of those hired admitted they did not realize they were on the City payroll. "All in the Family" was a popular name for O'Connor's hiring practices, and O'Connor became known as the "City Hall Santa". O'Connor compared his hiring practices to those of Britain's royal family. When asked at a City Hall news conference if the practice amounted to nepotism, O'Connor said: "Absolutely. I think nepotism is a system that has been around a long time. It has worked very well in England. I don't think it's been much more of a problem here."

In 2008, O'Connor was found to be one of seven Chicago aldermen who between them got ten of their children good-paying summer jobs with the Metropolitan Water Reclamation District of Greater Chicago.

In May 2013, O'Connor suggested that the Catholic Church and other religious institutions and not for profit organizations should pay property taxes and be billed for water provided by the City of Chicago. O'Connor's comments were in support of a plan by Mayor Rahm Emanuel to charge such organizations for water which had traditionally been provided without charge to not for profit organizations. “The silliest things can be said and people latch onto it.” O’Connor said. “For Chrissake, we sell everybody water! And now all of a sudden because we’re a church, we’re not supposed to sell them water? At some point, i think what’s gonna happen is someone’s gonna say how about looking at property taxes? We’ll give ya free water. How about paying for the property you own.” O'Connor further suggested that the Catholic Church should not criticize the plan to bill it for water use, but ought to address its clerical abuse scandals.

O'Connor is married to Barbara O'Connor, a real estate broker. In the last decade Barbara has built a successful business selling houses and condos, many of which could not have been built without zoning changes enacted by the city council. Barbara sold more than $22 million worth of houses and condos in the 40th ward after the projects were enabled by Alderman O'Connor.

== Unsuccessful campaigns for other offices ==
In 1990, O'Connor was defeated by Cecil Partee in a four-way race for the Democratic nomination for Cook County State's Attorney in the Democratic primary on March 20, 1990, with Partee garnering 49% of the vote to O'Connor's 37.5%.

O'Connor was defeated in his challenge to Republican incumbent Jack O'Malley in a campaign for Cook County State's Attorney in the general election of November 3, 1992, with O'Malley garnering 62% of the vote to O'Connor's 38%. O'Connor lost to O'Malley in O'Connor's own ward, 8,516 to 9,363.

On Tuesday, March 3, 2009, O'Connor finished fifth in a 12-way race in the primary election for the Democratic Party nomination for the United States House of Representatives in the special election called to replace US Rep. Rahm Emanuel in Illinois's 5th congressional district.
