= Michael Rodriguez (politician) =

American politician

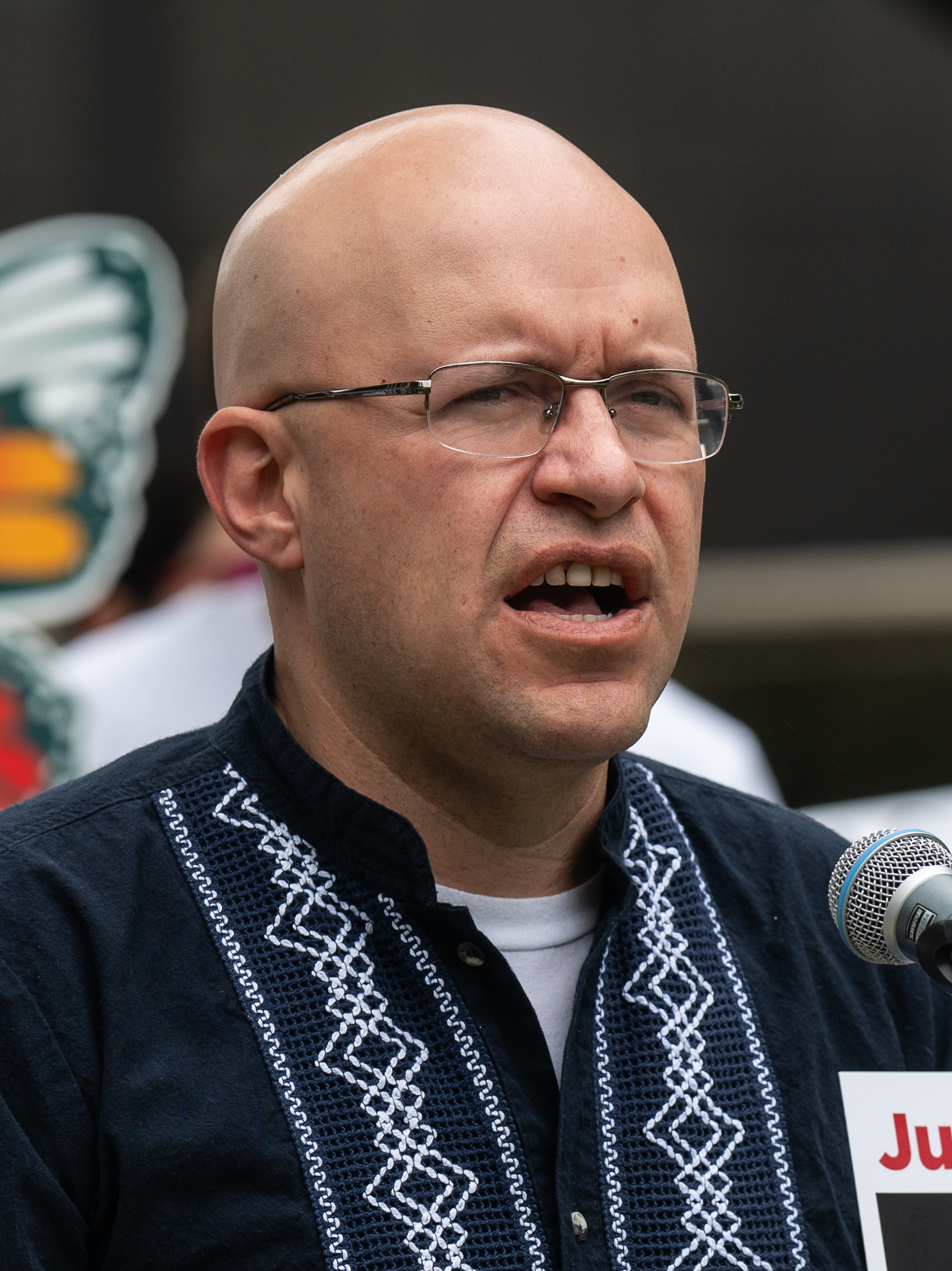
- Rodriguez speaks at Vigil to Demand Justice for Lorenzo and Johan (2026)

Member of the Chicago City Council from the 22nd ward
- Incumbent
- Assumed office May 20, 2019
- Preceded by: Ricardo Muñoz

Personal details
- Born: August 31, 1978 (age 48)
- Party: Democratic
- Education: DePaul University (BA); University of Chicago (MA)

Michael D. Rodriguez (born August 31, 1978) is a Chicago politician. He is the alderman of Chicago's 22nd ward and took office as a member of the Chicago City Council in May 2019. He was elected in the 2019 aldermanic election, in an open race to succeed incumbent alderman Ricardo Muñoz.

== Early life and education ==
Rodriguez earned a bachelor's degree from DePaul University and a master's degree from the School of Social Service Administration at the University of Chicago. He worked as an executive officer at the Cook County Medical Examiner's Office and was the executive director of the non-profit Enlace, an organization founded by Congressman Jesus "Chuy" Garcia, that worked on social issues in Little Village.

Rodriguez ran for 22nd ward alderman in the 2019 election for Chicago City Council, in an open race to succeed incumbent Ricardo Munoz. Facing three other candidates in the first round of the election on February 26, 2019, he won 64% of the vote and became the alderman-elect.

On April 10, 2019, Rodriguez joined six other newly elected members of the City Council in protesting against the approval of tax increment financing for the Lincoln Yards and The 78 real estate developments.

== Chicago City Council ==
Rodriguez took office as a member of the Chicago City Council on May 20, 2019.

In November 2019, Rodriguez was one of eleven aldermen to vote against Mayor Lori Lightfoot's first budget.

On April 11, 2020, Hilco Redevelopment Partners, with approval by the administration of Mayor Lori Lightfoot, coordinated an implosion of a 275-foot smokestack during the COVID-19 pandemic, resulting in a cloud of dust and particulate matter to envelop the surrounding area, mostly contained within the boundaries of Chicago's 22nd Ward. Rodriguez notified the community of the pending implosion through social media after Hilco failed to inform the community as it had promised.

== Electoral history ==
Chicago 22nd ward aldermanic general election, 2019
Party	Candidate	Votes	%
Nonpartisan	Mike Rodriguez	3,104	63.80
Nonpartisan	Lisette "Liz" Lopez	675	13.87
Nonpartisan	Neftalie Gonzalez	476	9.78
Total votes		4,865	100

Chicago 22nd ward aldermanic general election, 2023
Party	Candidate	Votes	%
Nonpartisan	Mike Rodriguez (incumbent)	3,070	66.34
Nonpartisan	Kristian R. Armendariz	834	18.02
Nonpartisan	Neftalie Gonzalez	724	15.64
Total votes		4,628	100

== See also ==
- List of Chicago alderpersons since 1923
