= Margaret Laurino =

American politician from Illinois

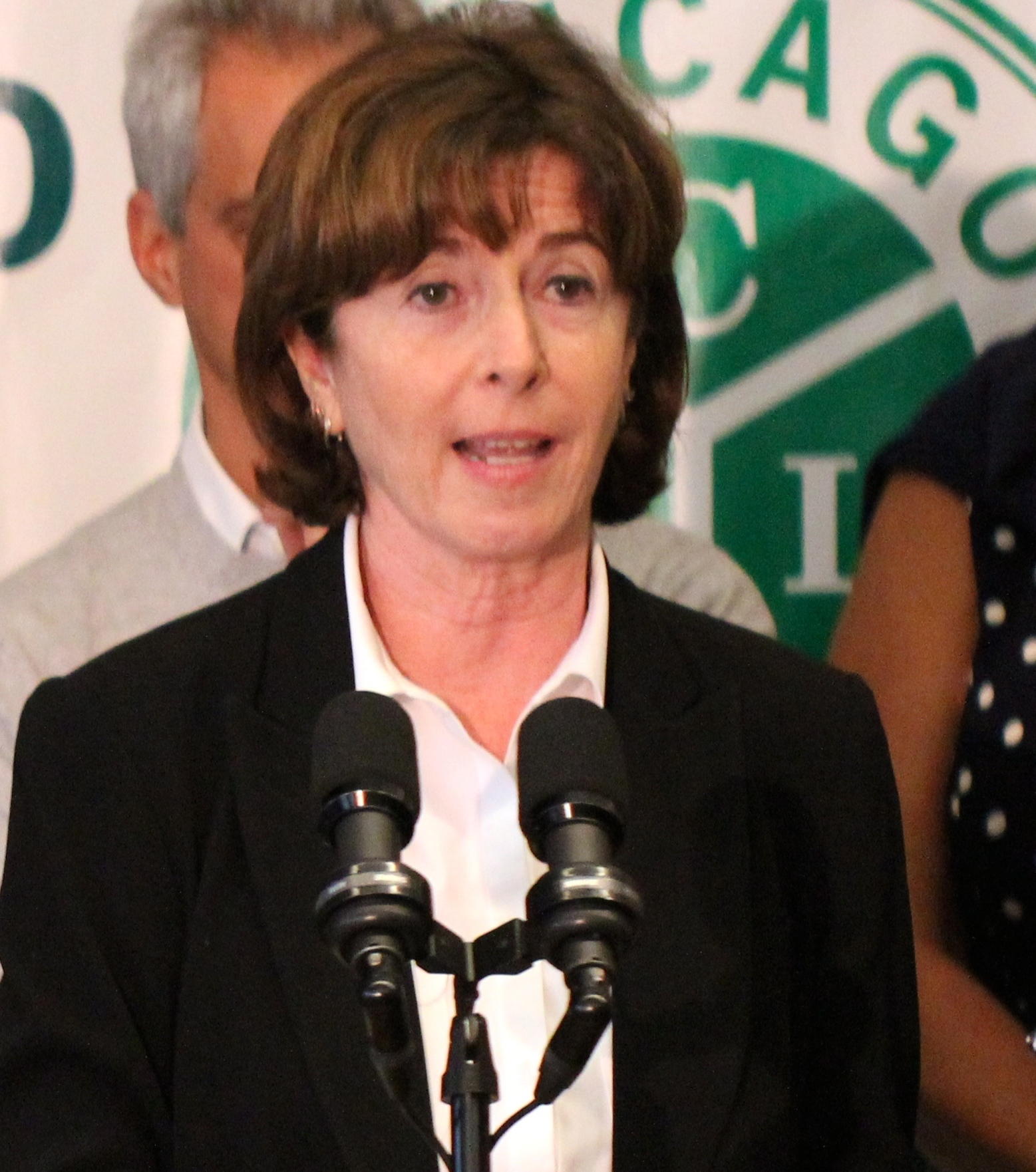

City of Chicago Alderman from the 39th Ward
- In office July 24, 1994 – May 20, 2019
- Preceded by: Anthony C. Laurino
- Succeeded by: Samantha Nugent

Personal details
- Party: Democratic
- Education: Northeastern Illinois University

Margaret Laurino Barnette (born June 17, 1952) is a former alderman of the 39th Ward of the City of Chicago. She is the daughter of former Alderman Anthony C. Laurino, the sister of former state Representative William Laurino, and the wife of former 39th Ward Democratic Committeeman Randy Barnette.

== Early life ==
Laurino is a lifelong resident of Chicago; she attended St. Edward's Elementary School and Alvernia High School. She went on to Northeastern Illinois University where she earned her bachelor's degree in Education and master's degree in History.

== Family legacy and controversy ==
Her father, Anthony C. Laurino, became the 39th ward alderman in 1965 and served for nearly three decades; he was quoted in a 1987 interview with the Chicago Tribune as saying that he walked the alleys of the ward to get to know residents and became known as the "alley alderman." When he resigned in 1994 due to poor health, she was appointed to replace him by Mayor Richard M. Daley.

=== Family indictments and convictions in ghost-payrolling ===
A year later, the elder Laurino was indicted by federal investigators on a ghost-payrolling scheme. He died before the trial was concluded, but several family members were convicted, including his wife, Bonnie Rhein Laurino; another daughter, Marie D'Amico; and D'Amico's husband, John.

== Aldermanic career ==
Laurino is Chairperson of the Economic, Capital and Technology Development Committee where she has worked on a proposal for citywide wireless Internet access. She also created the Aldermanic Technology Task Force, which meets quarterly to discuss technological needs in city government.

As of February, 2012 Alderman Laurino is Chairman of the Committee on Pedestrian and Traffic Safety.

She also serves on the Committee on Budget and Government Operations, Committee on Committees, Rules and Ethic, Committee on Education and Child Development, Committee on Finance, Committee on Workforce Development and Audit, Committee on Zoning, Landmarks and Building Standards.

In addition to technology advancements, Laurino has proposed several other ordinances: legislation that regulates restrictive covenants on land occupied by grocery and drug stores, and legislation that created mandatory ethics training for all city employees that could be done online.

Laurino's accomplishments include: a new police station in her ward, a new health center at Roosevelt High School, and helping bring $500,000 for improvements into the homes of senior citizens.

In 2013 she was elected by the Chicago City Council to serve as its President Pro Tempore.

== Aldermanic challenges ==
In 1995, Laurino was forced into a challenging run-off with Tony Fornelli, ultimately winning with 61 percent of the vote. In 1999 she again won 61 percent of the vote, then ran unopposed in 2003 and received 79 percent of the vote in 2007.

== 2011 campaign ==
In 2010, four candidates filed to run in the 39th Ward aldermanic campaign; with the exception of Laurino, all of them later faced objector petitions claiming that they failed to gather enough signatures. All of the objector petitions were filed by Rosa and Pat J. Kelly, and Pat Kelly reportedly works in Laurino's office. Matthew J. Robinson was kept off the ballot but ran as a write-in candidate. Lyndon A. Johnson was also kept off the ballot and possibly was running a mock-campaign. Mary Hunter stayed on the ballot and ran a grassroots campaign. Laurino won with 76% of the vote to Hunter's 24%.

== 2015 campaign ==
In 2014, community organization president Robert Murphy ran against Laurino. Murphy dragged Laurino under 60% for the first time in a three way race.
