= SEIU Healthcare =

Trade union in Canada

- Services Employees International Union Healthcare
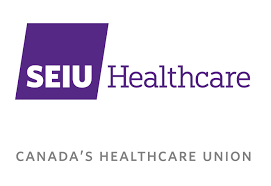
- Founded: SEIU Local 1 Canada (2004-2013); SEIU Healthcare (since 2013)
- Headquarters: Richmond Hill, Ontario
- Location: Canada
- Members: 65,000
- Key people: Tyler Downey (president) Jackie Walker (executive vice-president) Sandi Jones (Nursing Division president)
- Parent organization: SEIU
- Affiliations: Ontario Federation of Labour, Canadian Labour Congress
- Website: www.seiuhealthcare.ca

SEIU Healthcare is a Canadian trade union representing more than 65,000 workers in Ontario, Canada. Through collective bargaining, the union represents workers in hospitals, home care, nursing and retirement homes, and community services. The union has been active in Ontario for over 70 years.

SEIU Healthcare is distinct from SEIU Local 2 Canada, though both SEIU Healthcare and Local 2 are affiliated with SEIU.

Since 2004, the union's governing structure and membership servicing has been based on a mega-local and business union model. SEIU's organizational structure and leadership has been criticized by several labour activists as undemocratic and bureaucratic.

The majority of SEIU Healthcare's units do not have the right to strike, as they are bound by Ontario's Hospital Labour Disputes Arbitration Act (HLDAA).

In 2013, SEIU Local 1 Ontario rebranded itself and changed its name to SEIU Healthcare to publicly appeal to the patients, residents and clients who are taken care of by SEIU workers in the healthcare sector.

== History ==
Originally known as the Building Service Employees International Union, the Canadian division of the union established its first two locals in Montreal and Vancouver in 1943. Members at these two locals were mainly elevator operators, window cleaners, janitors and other maintenance employees in commercial buildings.

SEIU started organizing healthcare workers in Ontario hospitals in the early 1940s. SEIU continued its efforts and formed Canada's first hospital local at the Toronto General Hospital in 1944, and went on to organize four hospitals in Thunder Bay in 1946.

SEIU continued to expand in hospitals and nursing homes. Throughout the 1980s, SEIU campaigned to protect nursing home jobs from outsourcing, advocated for pension plans for thousands of nursing home workers worth over $304 million in assets, and helped stop the Ontario Government from passing a law that would restrict yearly wage increases.

In the mid-1990s, SEIU took the Ontario Government to court after the Progressive Conservatives tried to limit Ontario's pay equity legislation. This legal action pressured the government in June 2003 to commit up to $414 million in pay equity funding for 100,000 women across Ontario.

=== 1998–2004: CAW "raids" and the mega-merger ===
By the end of the 1990s, SEIU International began restructuring. The union called for locals, including those in Canada, to merge into mega-locals. SEIU International believed a mega-local structure would effectively challenge more employers, transform the existing political climate, and also address SEIU Canada's internal problems. However, the call for a mega-merger came with the cost of transforming the union into a top-down, business union as it sacrificed bottom-up, rank-and-file driven union democracy. Then-SEIU International President Andy Stern argues that bargaining units "with less than 100,000 members lacked the power to effectively deal with employers or governments", even at the cost of democratic decision-making. Although merging existing SEIU locals makes the union less democratic, Stern argues that it's a necessary change to address growing economic issues and membership decline. According to Stern, "Workers want their lives to be changed. They want strength and a voice, not some purist, intellectual, historical, mythical democracy. Workers can win when they are united, and leaders who stand in the way of change screaming "democracy" are failing to understand how workers exercise the limited power they have..."

Instead of merging the locals or defecting to other unions, in 1998, SEIU's Canadian leadership, including the national executive board and local presidents, created a working group to examine ways to address the political and economic challenges, improve servicing, and strengthen SEIU's structure in Canada. Dubbed the "November Group", this body put forward a proposal that would give SEIU Canada and its locals greater autonomy in its decision-making, financial structures and the establishment of their strategic goals.

The November group's proposals, however, were not accepted by SEIU International, and the latter decided to forcefully merge the locals without consent. Backed by SEIU's International Constitution which permits merging locals together as it sees fit, Canadian locals had no choice. As a result, on February 20, 2000, a meeting of executive committee members from the eight SEIU locals in Ontario was convened where the unanimous decision was made to propose to the existing 30,000 members to leave SEIU and join CAW. Then-CAW President Buzz Hargrove described frustration due to "dictatorial leadership from Washington, poor service, and a fundamental lack of control over their Canadian affairs."

SEIU International responded by immediately placing all eight locals under trusteeship. All staff members from the locals were dismissed, as were all members of the executive committees. A $3.7 million lawsuit was launched by the International against the executive committee members of the eight locals. SEIU International then appointed Sharleen Stewart as the new Canadian vice-president.

On March 2, 2000, the day that the proposed defecting vote was to be held, SEIU International obtained an injunction from the Ontario Superior Court of Justice to render the vote non-binding. Nonetheless, the vote took place and about 11,000 members of the Ontario SEIU locals cast ballots to leave SEIU. Then, between March 2000 and March 2001, 180 SEIU bargaining units, representing over 14,000 members, left the SEIU and joined the CAW. These decertification votes averaged around 95% in favour of switching to the CAW. Buzz Hargrove defended CAW's actions, saying that they had "no choice but to honour the expressed will of those who had overwhelmingly voted to leave SEIU". Despite members voting in favour of leaving SEIU, the CAW was sanctioned by the Canadian Labour Congress for raiding.

In October 2003, the six remaining locals voted to merge their healthcare and community-service members into one provincial local named SEIU Local 1.on. SEIU International issued a charter for SEIU Local 1 on January 8, 2004, and approved the new local's constitution on March 26, 2004.

=== 2013–present: rebranding as Canada's Healthcare Union ===
In 2013, SEIU Local 1.on changed its name to "SEIU Healthcare", and rebranded its logo and slogan to appeal to patients, residents and clients under the care of SEIU workers. Former President Stewart believed this transformation was as a move towards being a "21st-century, solution-based union; a union that all members know makes their lives better; a union that teaches employers and governments that the labour movement is a valued partner, not an opponent."

== Political action and affiliations ==
Over the last decade, SEIU Healthcare has increased its focus on electoral politics. The union played an important role in the 2014 Ontario provincial elections by helping elect former Ontario Liberal Party leader Kathleen Wynne. During both the 2014 and 2018 voting cycles, SEIU mobilized hundreds of members across the province to contact voters in key ridings and to encourage them to strategically vote and support the candidate who was most likely to strengthen Ontario's public healthcare system and improve collective bargaining rights.

SEIU Healthcare is affiliated with the Ontario Federation of Labour and the Canadian Labour Congress.

== Governing structure and leadership ==
SEIU Healthcare's governance structure consists of three officers (president, vice-president, treasurer-secretary) and 17 executive board members. In the event of a vacancy, under article 5.8 of the constitution, the president can appoint a vice-president or treasurer-secretary without a vote from the membership or executive board. In 2015, the union restructured its executive board to include seven seats specifically for equity-seeking groups: workers of colour, LGBTQ, persons with disability, retirees, young workers, women and aboriginal/indigenous.

=== Nursing division ===
SEIU Healthcare has a dedicated nursing division that holds its own convention and has a separate governing board, constitution and professional liaison staff. The division advocates for nursing in Ontario regarding professional practices, scope of practice and delivery of care by nurses. The Nursing Division Board is led by President Sandi Jones, and consists of three vice presidents (Hospital, Home & Community Care, and Long-Term Care) and eight regional representations.

=== Current officers ===
- Tyler Downey (president, 2024–current)
- Jackie Walker (executive vice-president, 2023–current)
- Sandi Jones (Nursing Division president, 2024–current)

=== Internal organization ===
The head office is located in Richmond Hill, and there are regional offices in Barrie, Ottawa, St. Catharines, London, North Bay and Thunder Bay.

== See also ==
- Business unionism
- Labor aristocracy

== Bibliography ==
- Moody, Kim. An Injury to All: The Decline of American Unionism, San Francisco, CA, & Chelsea, MI: Verso, 1988. ISBN 0860919293.
