= Samantha Nugent =

American politician

Sam Nugent

President pro tempore of the Chicago City Council
- Incumbent
- Assumed office May 15, 2023
- Preceded by: Brendan Reilly

Member of the Chicago City Council from the 39th ward
- Incumbent
- Assumed office May 20, 2019
- Preceded by: Margaret Laurino

Personal details
- Born: April 27, 1977 (age 49)
- Party: Democratic
- Education: University of Connecticut, Storrs (BA); Loyola University Chicago (JD)
- Website: Official website

Samantha "Sam" Nugent is the current alderwoman of the 39th ward of the City of Chicago, Illinois. Nugent won the 39th Ward general runoff election on April 2, 2019, after advancing from the general election on February 26, 2019.

== See also ==
- List of Chicago alderpersons since 1923
