= Byron Sigcho-Lopez =

American politician (born 1983)

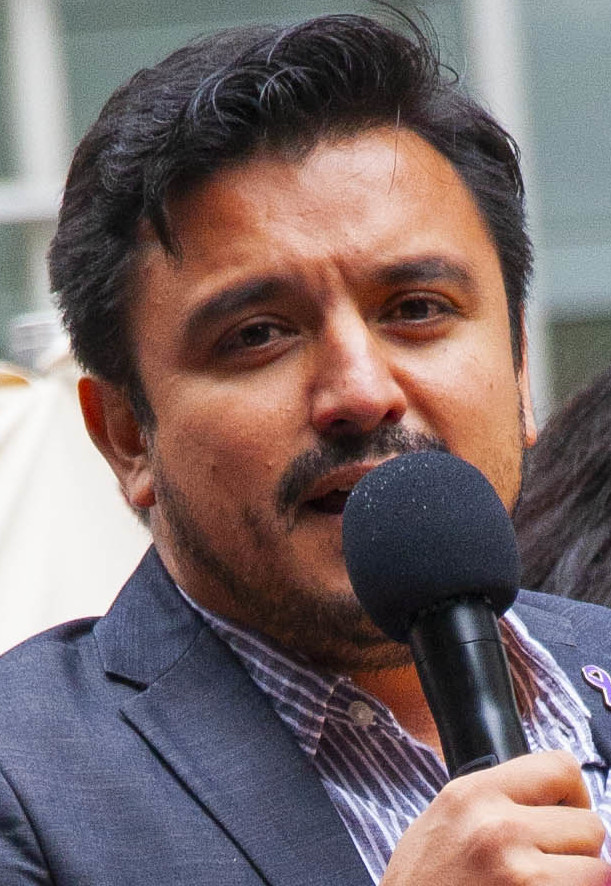
- Sigcho-Lopez in 2019

Member of the Chicago City Council from the 25th ward
- Incumbent
- Assumed office May 20, 2019
- Preceded by: Daniel Solis

Personal details
- Born: July 7, 1983 (age 43) Ecuador
- Party: Democratic
- Education: Cumberland University (BA); University of Illinois, Chicago (MA)

Byron Sigcho-Lopez (born July 7, 1983) is a Chicago politician and community activist. He is the alderman of Chicago's 25th ward, having taken office as a member of the Chicago City Council in May 2019. He won an open race to succeed outgoing alderman Daniel Solis in the 2019 Chicago aldermanic election. He is a member of the Democratic Socialists of America. He was elected as 25th Ward Democratic Committeeperson in 2020.

== Early life and education ==
Sigcho-Lopez was born and raised in Quito, Ecuador. Sigcho-Lopez earned a bachelor's degree from Cumberland University in Tennessee, and a Master's from the University of Illinois at Chicago.

== Political career ==
Sigcho-Lopez unsuccessfully challenged Danny Solis in the 2015 Chicago 25th Ward aldermanic election.

In 2019, Sigcho-Lopez was elected to succeed outgoing 25th Ward alderman Danny Solis.

On April 10, 2019, prior to being sworn in, Sigcho-Lopez joined six other newly elected members of the City Council in protesting against the approval of tax increment financing for the Lincoln Yards and The 78 real estate developments.

Sigcho-Lopez assumed office May 20, 2019.

On June 12, 2019, Sigcho-Lopez demanded a review of all permits and licenses approved by disgraced former Alderman Danny Solis.

In November 2019, Sigcho-Lopez was one of eleven aldermen to vote against Mayor Lori Lightfoot's first budget. He joined all five other members of the Socialist Caucus in signing a letter to Lightfoot which criticized her budget for "an over-reliance on property taxes" and "regressive funding models" that are "burdensome to our working-class citizens, while giving the wealthy and large corporations a pass." Sigcho-Lopez, over the course of Lightfoot's mayoralty, would be regarded to be a vocal critic of hers.

On March 22, 2024, Sigcho-Lopez spoke at a City Hall rally against the Gaza war at which Marine veteran Zachary Kam had burned a flag that he had flown while on tour in Afghanistan. This prompted some of Sigcho-Lopez's City Council colleagues to call for him step down as chairman of the Council's Housing Committee. On April 1, 2024, a resolution to remove him as chair failed 29 to 16.

On January 28, 2026, Sigcho-Lopez announced his campaign for the U.S. House of Representatives in Illinois's 4th district. He failed to qualify for the ballot after the Illinois State Board of Elections found that he had not gathered enough valid signatures on his nominating petition. In August, he sued the State of Illinois to restore his ballot access, though a decision was not reached on his case before the election.

== Personal life ==
Sigcho-Lopez is married to Loreen Targos. In June 2022, Sigcho-Lopez and Targos became parents to triplets.

In August 2026, Byron Sigcho’s previously sealed divorce papers were unsealed and it revealed he has an alleged porn, sex and escort addiction. Sigcho has denied the claims. The judge court granted the divorced based on testimony.

== Electoral history ==
Chicago 25th ward aldermanic general election, 2015
Party	Candidate	Votes	%
Nonpartisan	Daniel "Danny" Solis (incumbent)	3,811	51.07
Nonpartisan	Byron Sigcho-Lopez	1,383	18.53
Nonpartisan	Jorge Mujica	907	12.15
Nonpartisan	Roberto "Beto" Montano	748	10.02
Nonpartisan	Ed Hershey	614	8.23
Total votes		7,463	100

Chicago 25th ward aldermanic general election, 2019
Party	Candidate	Votes	%
Nonpartisan	Byron Sigcho-Lopez	2,885	29.23
Nonpartisan	Alexander Acevedo	2,182	22.11
Nonpartisan	Hilario Dominguez	2,056	20.83
Nonpartisan	Aida Flores	1,912	19.37
Nonpartisan	Troy Antonio Hernandez	835	8.46
Total votes		9,870	100

Chicago 25th ward aldermanic runoff election, 2019
Party	Candidate	Votes	%
Nonpartisan	Byron Sigcho-Lopez	5,224	54.20
Nonpartisan	Alexander Acevedo	4,414	45.80
Total votes		9,638	100.0

Chicago 25th ward aldermanic general election, 2023
Party	Candidate	Votes	%
Nonpartisan	Byron Sigcho-Lopez (incumbent)	4,201	52.94
Nonpartisan	Aida Flores	3,374	47.06
Total votes		7,935	100

== See also ==
- List of Chicago alderpersons since 1923
- List of Democratic Socialists of America who have held office in the United States
