= Andre Vasquez =

American politician (born 1979)

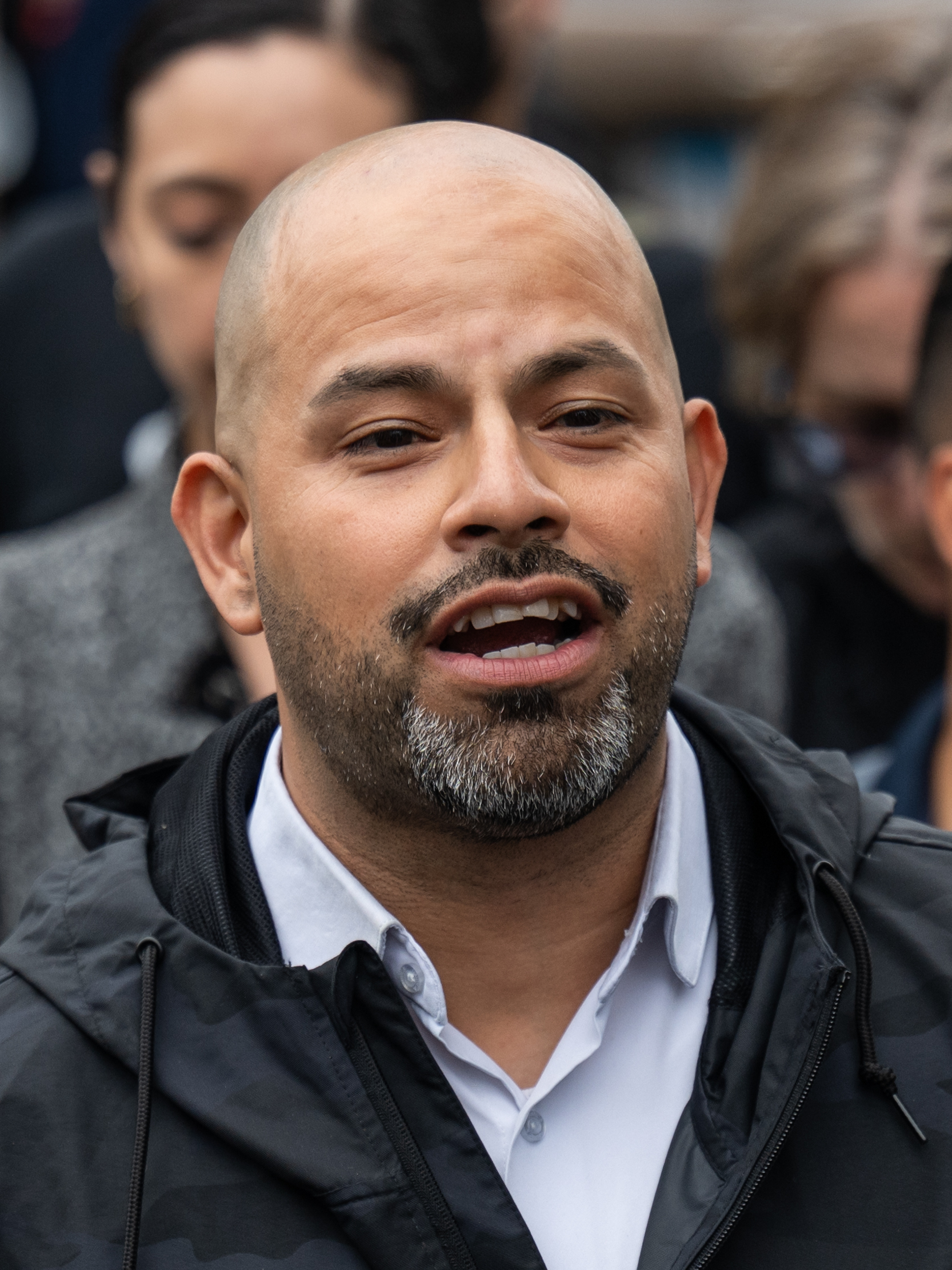
- Vasquez in 2025

Member of the Chicago City Council from the 40th ward
- Incumbent
- Assumed office May 20, 2019
- Preceded by: Patrick J. O'Connor

Personal details
- Born: May 21, 1979 (age 47) Chicago, Illinois, U.S.
- Party: Democratic
- Education: University of Illinois, Chicago; Kaplan University

Andre Vasquez (born May 21, 1979) is a Chicago politician, community organizer, and former rapper. He is currently serving in the Chicago City Council as alderperson for the 40th ward, which includes parts of Lincoln Square, West Ridge, and Edgewater. He won election to that office in 2019, defeating incumbent Patrick O'Connor, and was re-elected in 2023. Since 2023, he has served as co-chair of the Progressive Caucus.

Vasquez is a democratic socialist.

== Early life, education, and career ==
Vasquez was born in Chicago on May 21, 1979, and attended Lane Technical College Prep High School. He attended the University of Illinois at Chicago, where he studied English/Language Arts Teacher Education, but did not graduate. He later earned an associate degree in business administration and management from Kaplan University in 2014.

As of 2019, he held a position as a cell phone account manager at AT&T.

=== Hip-hop career ===
During the late 1990s and early 2000s, Vasquez performed as a hip-hop artist under the stage name Prime, a reference to the fictional character Optimus Prime. He first became involved in battle rap during his time at Lane Tech High School in the early 1990s, and later became a member of the underground hip-hop collective Molemen. He also toured with the hip-hop group Atmosphere and appeared on MTV's Direct Effect and HBO's Blaze Battle. He ended his career as a rapper in 2010.

Vasquez's career as a rapper later became the subject of controversy during his 2019 campaign for Chicago City Council, when his opponent criticized him for using misogynistic and homophobic lyrics. Vasquez apologized for the lyrics, saying that "As a person who felt inadequate in my own skin, I thought denigrating others would make me feel bigger and there is no excuse for that."

== Early political career ==
Vasquez became involved in electoral politics during the 2016 presidential election as a supporter of Bernie Sanders. As of 2019, he was the chair of the north side chapter of Reclaim Chicago, a progressive political action committee.

In May 2018, Vasquez officially kicked off his campaign for alderman of Chicago's 40th ward. He was one of five candidates who appeared on the ballot in the first-round election on February 26, 2019, where he placed second with about 20% of the vote. Since no candidate received more than half of the vote, he and 36-year incumbent Patrick J. O'Connor advanced to a run-off election held on April 2. Vasquez defeated O'Connor in that election, receiving 54% of the vote.

On April 10, 2019, Vasquez joined six other newly elected members of the City Council in protesting against the approval of tax increment financing for the Lincoln Yards and The 78 real estate developments.

== Chicago City Council (2019–present) ==
Vasquez was sworn in as a member of Chicago City Council on May 20, 2019. He is a member of the Council's Progressive Caucus.

In November 2019, Vasquez was one of eleven aldermen to vote against Mayor Lori Lightfoot's first budget. He joined all five other members of the Socialist Caucus in signing a letter to Lightfoot which criticized her budget for "an over-reliance on property taxes" and "regressive funding models" that are "burdensome to our working-class citizens, while giving the wealthy and large corporations a pass."

In November 2020, Vasquez voted in favor of the Mayor's 2021 budget proposal, which passed by a 29–21 vote. Vasquez said that his vote was based on achieving several concessions as amendments to the Mayor's original proposal and a commitment from colleagues to include progressive and structural revenue options in the 2022 budget proposal. Vasquez was censured by the Chicago chapter of the Democratic Socialists of America who said in a statement that Vasquez had "sided with an austerity regime and the Democratic Party establishment over the interests of Chicago’s working class."

=== Committee on Immigrant and Refugee Rights ===
Vasquez became chairperson of Chicago City Council's Committee on Immigrant and Refugee Rights in 2023, promising to hold meetings of the Committee, which at that time had not met in over a year, every month.

On September 14th, 2025, a dead rat and handwritten note of derogatory remarks against immigrants were left in front of Vasquez's office.

== See also ==
- List of Chicago alderpersons since 1923
- List of Democratic Socialists of America who have held office in the United States
