= Chicago Aldermanic Black Caucus =

Bloc of aldermen in the Chicago City Council

- Chair: Stephanie Coleman
- Founded: 2015; 10 years ago
- Seats in Chicago City Council: 20 / 50

Website
- Facebook page

The Chicago Aldermanic Black Caucus is a bloc of aldermen in the Chicago City Council, designed with the goal of "representing the needs and interests of Chicago's Black communities." During the 2019–23 term, the caucus consists of 20 members, out of the council's 50 aldermen. As of June 2023, the chair of the caucus is Stephanie Coleman.

== Membership ==
=== Current members ===
As of January 2020, the Caucus has 20 members.

Member	Ward	Joined
Pat Dowell	3	
Sophia King	4	
Leslie Hairston	5	
Roderick Sawyer	6	
Gregory Mitchell	7	
Michelle A. Harris	8	
Anthony Beale	9	
Stephanie Coleman	16	2019
David Moore	17	
Derrick Curtis	18	
Jeanette Taylor	20	2019
Howard Brookins	21	
Michael Scott Jr.	24	
Walter Burnett Jr.	27	
Jason Ervin	28	
Chris Taliaferro	29	
Carrie Austin	34	
Emma Mitts	37	
Matt Martin	47	2019
Maria Hadden	49	2019

=== Past members ===
Member	Ward	Joined	Left
Toni Foulkes	16		2019; lost re-election
Willie Cochran	20		2019; did not run for re-election

== Activity in City Council ==
=== 2019–23 term ===
In October 2019, the Black Caucus delayed a vote on a proposed ordinance authorizing legal cannabis dispensaries, expressing concerns that the ordinance would allow medical dispensaries to sell marijuana recreationally without a zoning change and that it did not have sufficient ownership requirements to enable minority business ownership. The ordinance passed despite the Caucus' opposition, although some Caucus members and Mayor Lightfoot did suggest that they would pursue amendments to the state cannabis law. After the city's first recreational dispensary license lottery, where only existing owners of medical dispensaries—who were all white—were eligible, the Black Caucus again proposed stalling sales in order to achieve the state law's social equity goals. In December 2019, Caucus chair Ervin and other members threatened to force a vote on an ordinance to stall sales until July 1 (six months after the originally scheduled date of January 1) in order to demand a minority ownership stake in the market. Such a vote to delay sales was held but failed to pass on December 18 in a 19–29 vote, with six members of the Black Caucus splitting to vote against the measure.

== See also ==
- Chicago City Council Democratic Socialist Caucus
- Chicago City Council Latino Caucus
- Chicago City Council LGBT Caucus
- Chicago City Council Progressive Reform Caucus
