= 2015 Chicago aldermanic election =

2015 Chicago aldermanic elections
- February 24 and April 7, 2015
- Results by ward. The map shows the winning candidate's party affiliations, even though aldermen run as nonpartisans. A white asterisk (*) means the results for that ward were decided in a runoff vote.
Elected Alderman
TBD

The 2015 Chicago aldermanic elections was held on February 24, 2015, to elect the 50 aldermen who represent Chicago in the City Council. The elections were non-partisan. If no candidate received an absolute majority, a runoff would be held between the top two finishers on April 7, 2015.

Ward boundaries had been redrawn since the previous 2011 election, to reflect the results of the 2010 United States census. The new ward map had been approved by the Chicago City Council in January 2012.

== Overview ==
=== Campaign ===
43 incumbent aldermen sought re-election. Aldermen Edward M. Burke (14th Ward), Marty Quinn (13th Ward), Brendan Reilly (42nd Ward) and Harry Osterman (48th Ward) all ran unopposed. Aldermen Toni Foulkes (15th Ward) and Nicholas Sposato (36th Ward) ran in different wards than those they had been incumbents of: the 16th and 38th, respectively. Incumbent aldermen Robert Fioretti (2nd Ward), James Balcer (11th Ward), Latasha Thomas (17th Ward) and Timothy Cullerton (38th Ward) did not run for re-election.

In the first round, two candidates who ran for re-election lost their seats, including Joann Thompson (who died in office, but remained on the ballot). There were runoffs in 18 wards. Six additional incumbent aldermen were defeated in runoffs.

=== Seat changes ===
Ward	Incumbent	Incumbent status	Elected alderman	Ref
2	Bob Fioretti	Retiring	Brian K. Hopkins	
7	Gregory Mitchell	Defeated in runoff election	Natashia Holmes	
10	John Pope	Defeated in runoff election	Susan Sadlowski Garza	
11	James Balcer	Retiring	Patrick Daley Thompson	
15	Toni Foulkes	Redistricted; ran successfully in 16th Ward	Raymond Lopez	
16	Joann Thompson	Died in office	Toni Foulkes	
17	Latasha Thomas	Retiring	David H. Moore	
18	Lona Lane	Defeated in runoff election	Derrick Curtis	
24	Michael Chandler	Retiring	Michael Scott Jr.	
29	Deborah L. Graham	Defeated in runoff election	Chris Taliaferro	
31	Ray Suarez	Defeated in runoff election	Milly Santiago	
35	Rey Colón	Defeated in general election	Carlos Ramirez-Rosa	
36	Nicholas Sposato	Redistricted; ran successfully in 38th Ward	Gilbert Villegas	
38	Timothy Cullerton	Retiring	Nicholas Sposato	
41	Mary O'Connor	Defeated in runoff election	Anthony Napolitano	

=== Election calendar ===
Thursday, December 18, 2014	Last day for candidates for the offices of mayor, clerk, treasurer and alderman to withdraw as a candidate (not later than the date of certification of candidates for the ballot). File in the office of the Board of Election Commissioners. No name so withdrawn shall be printed upon the ballot. If a request for withdrawal is received after this date (the date for certification of candidates for the ballot), then the votes cast for the withdrawn candidate are invalid and shall not be reported by the board (10 ILCS 5/10-7, 5/10-15; 65 ILCS 20/21-29).
Friday, December 26, 2014	Last day (by 5:00 p.m.) a person may file a notarized declaration of intent to be a write-in candidate for the February 24, 2015 municipal general election (not later than the 61st day before election–actual date is Thursday, December 25, 2015–moved to next business day per (10 ILCS 5/1-6; 10 ILCS 5/16-5.01)
Monday, January 12, 2015	Last day for board to have absentee ballots available for mailing to persons in the United States Service or their spouse and dependents of voting age and citizens temporarily residing outside the territorial limits of the United States who have filed an application for ballot prior to the 45th day before the election (45 days prior to date of election–actual date is Saturday, January 10, 2015–moved to next business day (10 ILCS 5/1-6; 10 ILCS 5/16-5.01).
Thursday, January 15, 2015	First day for mailing or delivery of absentee ballot.
Tuesday, January 27, 2015	Last day for regular voter registration in the office of the Board of Election Commissioners or to transfer registration to a new address for the February 24, 2015 municipal general election (registration may be taken up to and including the 28th day before election), with the exception of "grace period" registration and voting (10 ILCS 5/6-29).
Monday, February 9, 2015	First day for early voting at the offices of the board and at permanent and temporary polling place locations designated by the board (beginning the 15th day preceding the election). Early voting shall be conducted at permanent polling places between the hours of 9:00 a.m. to 5:00 p.m. on weekdays, 9:00 a.m. to 12:00 p.m. on Saturdays, and holidays and 12:00 p.m. to 3:00 p.m. on Sundays. Early voting may be also conducted at temporary polling places on days and at hours to be announced and published. (10 ILCS 5/19A-15)

== North Side ==
=== 1st Ward ===
Incumbent Alderman Proco Joe Moreno was reelected. He had been appointed alderman in 2010 by Mayor Richard M. Daley, and had subsequently been reelected in 2011.

==== Candidates ====
Certified candidates
Name	Experience	Ref
Andrew Hamilton	Lawyer	
Ronda Locke	Local school council representative, vice chair of the Commercial Park Advisory Council, marketing consultant	
Proco Joe Moreno	Incumbent alderman	
Anne Shaw	Former Cook County Board of Ethics commissioner, community activist, lawyer, business owner	

One candidate was removed from the ballot due to insufficient nominating petition signatures:

- Mia Lena Lopez

==== Endorsements ====
Proco Joe Moreno

Organizations

- SEIU Illinois

Newspapers

- Chicago Sun-Times
- Chicago Tribune

==== Results ====
1st Ward general election
Party	Candidate	Votes	%
Nonpartisan	Proco "Joe" Moreno (incumbent)	4,205	51.08
Nonpartisan	Anne Shaw	2,037	33.55
Nonpartisan	Ronda Locke	1,680	20.41
Nonpartisan	Andrew Hamilton	310	3.77
Total votes		8,232	100

=== 2nd Ward ===
Incumbent second-term alderman Bob Fioretti did not seek reelection, instead opting to run (unsuccessfully) for mayor. Brian Hopkins was elected to succeed him, defeating Alyx Pattison in a runoff.

==== Candidates ====
Certified candidates
Name	Experience	Ref
Bita Buenostro	Restaurant corporate executive	
Brian Hopkins	Chief of staff of Cook County Commissioner John P. Daley	
Stephen Niketopoulos	Local school council representative, neighborhood president, educational television producer	
Alyx Pattison	Attorney, former congressional aide	
Stacey Pfingsten	Former aide to incumbent 2nd Ward Alderman Bob Fioretti	
Cornell Wilson	Attorney and United States Marine Corps officer	

==== Endorsements ====
Alyx Pattison

Newspapers

- Chicago Sun-Times
- Chicago Tribune

==== Results ====
2nd Ward general election
Party	Candidate	Votes	%
Nonpartisan	Brian Hopkins	2,889	28.98
Nonpartisan	Alyx S. Pattison	2,404	24.11
Nonpartisan	Bita Buenostro	1,411	14.15
Nonpartisan	Stephen Niketopoulos	1,232	12.36
Nonpartisan	Stacey Pfingsten	1,170	11.74
Nonpartisan	Cornell Wilson	863	8.36
Total votes		9,969	100

2nd Ward runoff
Party	Candidate	Votes	%
Nonpartisan	Brian Hopkins	7,597	56.63
Nonpartisan	Alyx S. Pattison	5,819	43.37
Total votes		13,416	100.0

=== 32nd Ward ===
Incumbent second-term Alderman Scott Waguespack was reelected, defeating Elise Doody-Jones, his sole challenger.

==== Candidates ====
Certified candidates
Name	Experience	Ref
Elise Doody-Jones	Former treasurer of 1st Ward First, businesswoman	
Scott Waguespack	Incumbent alderman	

==== Endorsements ====
Scott Waguespack

Organizations

- Chicago Teachers Union
- Reclaim Chicago
- SEIU Illinois

Newspapers

- Chicago Sun-Times
- Chicago Tribune

==== Results ====
32nd Ward general election
Party	Candidate	Votes	%
Nonpartisan	Scott Waguespack (incumbent)	6,425	78.95
Nonpartisan	Elise Doody-Jones	1,713	21.05
Total votes		8,138	100

=== 40th Ward ===
Incumbent eighth-term Alderman Patrick J. O'Connor was reelected, defeating Dianne Daleiden, his sole challenger.

==== Candidates ====
Certified candidates
Name	Experience	Ref
Dianne Daleiden	Chicago Public Schools teacher	
Patrick J. O'Connor	Incumbent alderman	

==== Endorsements ====
Dianne Daleiden

Organizations

- Chicago Teachers Union
- Reclaim Chicago
Patrick O'Connor

Newspapers

- Chicago Sun-Times
- Chicago Tribune

==== Results ====
40th Ward general election
Party	Candidate	Votes	%
Nonpartisan	Patrick J. O'Connor (incumbent)	5,601	58.4
Nonpartisan	Dianne Daleiden	3,989	41.6
Total votes		9,590	100

=== 42nd Ward ===
Incumbent second-term Alderman Brendan Reilly was reelected, running unopposed.

==== Candidates ====
Certified candidates
Name	Experience	Ref
Brendan Reilly	Incumbent alderman	

==== Results ====
General election
Party	Candidate	Votes	%
Nonpartisan	Brendan Reilly (incumbent)	7,171	100
Total votes		7,171	100

=== 43rd Ward ===
Incumbent first-term Alderman Michelle Smith was reelected, defeating Caroline Vickrey in a runoff by a narrow 79 vote margin (equal to 0.54% of the votes cast in the runoff).

==== Candidates ====
Certified candidates
Name	Experience	Ref
Jen Kramer	Director of entertainment and special events at Navy Pier Inc., former In the events coordinator for the Chicago Mayor's Office, former president of Special Olympics Chicago	
Jerry Quandt	Founder of UNWIND, international marketing consultant	
Michele Smith	Incumbent alderman	
Caroline Vickrey	Lawyer	

One write-in candidate filed:

- Steven McClellan

One candidate was removed from the ballot due to insufficient nominating petition signatures:

- Steven McClellan (subsequently ran as a write-in)

The following candidate filed nominating petitions but withdrew before ballot certification:

- Andrew Challenger

==== Endorsements ====
Michele Smith

Newspapers

- Chicago Tribune
Caroline Vickrey

Newspapers

- Chicago Sun-Times

==== Results ====
43rd Ward general election
Party	Candidate	Votes	%
Nonpartisan	Michelle Smith (incumbent)	4,309	41.79
Nonpartisan	Caroline Vickrey	3,682	35.71
Nonpartisan	Jennifer "Jen" Kramer	1,707	16.55
Nonpartisan	Jerry Quandt	608	5.90
Write-in	Steven McClellan	6	0.06
Total votes		10,312	100

43rd Ward runoff
Party	Candidate	Votes	%
Nonpartisan	Michelle Smith (incumbent)	7,232	50.27
Nonpartisan	Caroline Vickrey	7,153	49.73
Total votes		14,385	100.0

=== 44th Ward ===
Incumbent third-term Alderman Tom Tunney was reelected.

==== Candidates ====
Certified candidates
Name	Experience	Ref
Scott Davis	Community activist	
Mark Thomas	Former president and co-founder of Central Lakeview Merchants Association, board member of Local First Chicago, business owner	
Tom Tunney	Incumbent alderman	

One write-in candidate filed:

- Robin Cook

==== Endorsements ====
Tom Tunney

Organizations

- Equality Illinois
- LGBTQ Victory Fund

Newspapers

- Chicago Sun-Times
- Chicago Tribune

==== Results ====
44th Ward general election
Party	Candidate	Votes	%
Nonpartisan	Tom Tunney (incumbent)	6,126	67.06
Nonpartisan	Mark Thomas	2,153	23.57
Nonpartisan	Scott Davis	854	9.35
Write-in	Robin Cook	2	0.02
Total votes		9,135	100

=== 46th Ward ===
Incumbent first-term Alderman James Cappleman was reelected, defeating Amy Crawford in a runoff.

==== Candidates ====
Certified candidates
Name	Experience	Ref
James Cappleman	Incumbent alderman	
Amy Crawford	Lawyer	
Denice L. Davis	Former director of community affairs for Congressman Bobby Rush and former chief of staff to Alderman Helen Shiller	

==== Endorsements ====
James Cappleman

Organizations

- Equality Illinois
- LGBTQ Victory Fund
Amy Crawford

Organizations

- Reclaim Chicago

Newspapers

- Chicago Sun-Times
- Chicago Tribune
Denice L. Davis

Organizations

- Chicago Teachers Union

==== Results ====
46th Ward general election
Party	Candidate	Votes	%
Nonpartisan	James Cappleman (incumbent)	4,800	46.87
Nonpartisan	Amy Crawford	3,853	37.62
Nonpartisan	Denice L. Davis	1,589	15.51
Total votes		10,242	100

46th Ward runoff
Party	Candidate	Votes	%
Nonpartisan	James Cappleman (incumbent)	7,035	53.7
Nonpartisan	Amy Crawford	6,065	46.3
Total votes		13,100	100

=== 47th Ward ===
Incumbent first-term Alderman Ameya Pawar was reelected, defeating Rory Fiedler, his sole challenger.

==== Candidates ====
Certified candidates
Name	Experience	Ref
Rory Fiedler		
Ameya Pawar	Incumbent alderman	

==== Endorsements ====
Ameya Pawar

Newspapers

- Chicago Sun-Times
- Chicago Tribune

==== Results ====
47th Ward general election
Party	Candidate	Votes	%
Nonpartisan	Ameya Pawar (incumbent)	9,974	82.78
Nonpartisan	Rory A. Fiedler	2,075	17.22
Total votes		12,049	100

=== 48th Ward ===
Incumbent first-term Alderman Harry Osterman was reelected, running unopposed.

==== Candidates ====
Certified candidates
Name	Experience	Ref
Harry Osterman	Incumbent alderman	

==== Results ====
48th Ward general election
Party	Candidate	Votes	%
Nonpartisan	Harry Osterman (incumbent)	9,456	100
Total votes		9,456	100

=== 49th Ward ===
Incumbent sixth-term Alderman Joe Moore was reelected, defeating Don Gordon, his sole challenger.

==== Candidates ====
Certified candidates
Name	Experience	Ref
Don Gordon	Community organizer, candidate for 49th Ward alderman in 2007	
Joe Moore	Incumbent alderman	

Four candidates were removed from the ballot due to insufficient nominating petition signatures or other reasons:

- John Beacham
- Connie Gates-Brown
- Grady A. Humphrey
- Nathan Benjamin "Ben" Myers

==== Endorsements ====
Joe Moore

Newspapers

- Chicago Sun-Times
- Chicago Tribune

==== Results ====
49th Ward general election
Party	Candidate	Votes	%
Nonpartisan	Joe Moore (incumbent)	5,578	66.84
Nonpartisan	Don Gordon	2,867	33.16
Total votes		8,645	100

=== 50th Ward ===
Incumbent first-term Alderman Debra Silverstein was reelected.

==== Candidates ====
Certified candidates
Name	Experience	Ref
Shajan M. Kuriakose	Business consultant	
Zehra Quadri	Founder of ZAM's Hope Community Resource Center	
Debra Silverstein	Incumbent alderman	

Two write-in candidates filed:

- Hilaire Fuji Shioura
- Peter Sifnotis

Two candidates were removed from the ballot due to insufficient nominating petition signatures:

- Hilaire Fuji Shioura (subsequently ran as a write-in)
- Peter George Sifnotis (subsequently ran as a write-in)

==== Endorsements ====
Shajan M. Kuriakose

Newspapers

- Chicago Tribune
Debra Silverstein

Newspapers

- Chicago Sun-Times

==== Results ====
50th Ward general election
Party	Candidate	Votes	%
Nonpartisan	Debra L. Silverstein (incumbent)	5,024	64.16
Nonpartisan	Shajan M. Kuriakose	1,406	17.95
Nonpartisan	Zehra Quadri	1,375	17.56
Write-in	Peter Sifnotis	19	0.24
Write-in	Hilaire Fuji Shioura	7	0.09
Total votes		7,831	100

== Northwest Side ==
=== 26th Ward ===
Incumbent Alderman Roberto Maldonado was reelected. He had been first appointed by Mayor Richard M. Daley in 2009, and had been subsequently reelected in 2011.

==== Candidates ====
Certified candidates
Name	Experience	Ref
Adam Corona	45th Ward Streets and Sanitation superintendent, business owner	
Juanita Irizarry	Statewide housing coordinator for the Office of the Governor	
Roberto Maldonado	Incumbent alderman	

==== Endorsements ====
Roberto Maldonado

Newspapers

- Chicago Tribune
Juanita Irizarry

Organizations

- Chicago Teachers Union
- Reclaim Chicago

Newspapers

- Chicago Sun-Times

==== Results ====
26th Ward general election
Party	Candidate	Votes	%
Nonpartisan	Roberto Maldonado (incumbent)	3,466	52.25
Nonpartisan	Juanita Irizarry	2,248	33.89
Nonpartisan	Adam Corona	919	13.85
Total votes		6,633	100

=== 30th Ward ===
Incumbent third-term Alderman Ariel Reboyras was reelected, running unopposed on the ballot, facing only a write-in opponent.

==== Candidates ====
Certified candidates
Name	Experience	Ref
Ariel Reboyras	Incumbent alderman	

One write-in candidate filed:

- Edgar Esparza

One candidate was removed from the ballot due to insufficient nominating petition signatures:

- Edgar Espparza (subsequently ran as a write-in)

The following candidate filed nominating petitions but withdrew before ballot certification:

- Walter Zarnecki

==== Results ====
30th Ward general election
Party	Candidate	Votes	%
Nonpartisan	Ariel E. Reboyras (incumbent)	4,119	99.32
Write-in	Edgar Esparza	28	0.68
Total votes		4,147	100

=== 31st Ward ===
Incumbent sixth-term alderman Ray Suarez unsuccessfully sought reelection. He was defeated in a runoff by Milly Santiago.

==== Candidates ====
Certified candidates
Name	Experience	Ref
Irma Cornier	Belmont Cragin neighborhood event organizer, employee of the Cook County Juvenile Temporary Detention Center	
Milly Santiago	Former chief of staff for Alderman Billy Ocasio, bilingual clerk for Chicago Public Schools in the Department of Bilingual Education, former member of the United States Army Reserves, television reporter for Telemundo	
Sean Starr	Lawyer and university professor	
Ray Suarez	Incumbent alderman	

==== Endorsements ====
Milly Santiago

Officeholders

- Luis Gutiérrez, United States congressman from Illinois's 4th congressional district

Newspapers

- Chicago Sun-Times
- Chicago Tribune

==== Results ====
31st Ward general election
Party	Candidate	Votes	%
Nonpartisan	Regner "Ray" Suarez (incumbent)	2,778	48.02
Nonpartisan	Milagros Santiago	2,146	37.10
Nonpartisan	Sean C. Starr	919	9.82
Nonpartisan	Irma Cornier	293	5.06
Total votes		5,785	100

31st Ward runoff
Party	Candidate	Votes	%
Nonpartisan	Milagros Santiago	4,218	50.47
Nonpartisan	Regner "Ray" Suarez (incumbent)	4,139	49.53
Total votes		8,357	100

=== 33rd Ward ===
Incumbent Alderman Deb Mell was reelected to a first full term. Mell had been appointed by Mayor Rahm Emanuel in 2013.

==== Candidates ====
Certified candidates
Name	Experience	Ref
Tim Meegan	Member of Albany Park Neighborhood Council, teacher at Roosevelt High School	
Deb Mell	Incumbent alderman	
Annisa Wanat	Member of the local school council at Albany Park Multicultural Academy	

One candidate was removed from the ballot due to insufficient nominating petition signatures:

- Tyler Solario

==== Endorsements ====
Tim Meegan

Organizations

- Chicago Teachers Union
- Reclaim Chicago
Deb Mell

Organizations

- Equality Illinois
- LGBTQ Victory Fund
Annisa Wanat

Newspapers

- Chicago Sun-Times
- Chicago Tribune

==== Results ====
33rd Ward general election
Party	Candidate	Votes	%
Nonpartisan	Deborah L. Mell (incumbent)	4,103	50.21
Nonpartisan	Tim Meegan	2,779	34.01
Nonpartisan	Annisa Wanat	1,289	15.78
Total votes		8,171	100

=== 35th Ward ===
Incumbent third-term alderman Rey Colón unsuccessfully sought reelection. He was defeated by Carlos Ramirez-Rosa, his sole challenger.

==== Candidates ====
Certified candidates
Name	Experience	Ref
Rey Colón	Incumbent alderman	
Carlos Ramirez-Rosa	Community organizer	

==== Endorsements ====
Rey Colón

Newspapers

- Chicago Sun-Times
Carlos Ramirez-Rosa

Organizations

- Chicago Teachers Union
- Reclaim Chicago
- SEIU Illinois

Newspapers

- Chicago Tribune

==== Results ====
35th Ward general election
Party	Candidate	Votes	%
Nonpartisan	Carlos Ramirez-Rosa	4,082	67.26
Nonpartisan	Rey Colón (incumbent)	1,987	32.74
Total votes		6,069	100

=== 36th Ward ===
Incumbent Nicholas Sposato ran in the adjacent 38th Ward due to redistricting. Gilbert Villegas was elected to succeed him as 36th Ward alderman, defeating Omar Aquino in a runoff.

==== Candidates ====
Certified candidates
Name	Experience	Ref
Omar Aquino	Former Illinois House of Representatives legislative aide	
Gilbert Villegas	Former chief of staff at the Illinois Capital Development Board, former member of the United States Marine Corps	
Christopher M. Vittorio	Business owner	
Alonso Zaragoza	Reference librarian	

One candidate was removed from the ballot due to insufficient nominating petition signatures:

- Joaquin Vazquez

==== Endorsements ====
First round

Christopher Vittorio

Newspapers

- Chicago Sun-Times
- Chicago Tribune

Runoff

Gilbert Villegas

Newspapers

- Chicago Sun-Times
- Chicago Tribune

==== Results ====
36th Ward general election
Party	Candidate	Votes	%
Nonpartisan	Omar Aquino	2,124	35.61
Nonpartisan	Gilbert Villegas	1,945	32.61
Nonpartisan	Christopher M. Vittorio	1,437	24.09
Nonpartisan	Alonso Zaragoza	458	7.68
Total votes		5,964	100

36th Ward runoff
Party	Candidate	Votes	%
Nonpartisan	Gilbert Villegas	4,594	55.68
Nonpartisan	Omar Aquino	3,656	44.32
Total votes		8,250	100

=== 38th Ward ===
Incumbent Timothy Cullerton did not run for reelection. Cullerton had been first appointed by Mayor Richard M. Daley in 2011, and had been elected outright to a full term in the 2011 aldermanic elections shortly thereafter. Redistricted 36th Ward incumbent Nicholas Sposato was elected to succeed Cullerton as 38th Ward alderman.

==== Candidates ====
Certified candidates
Name	Experience	Ref
Belinda Cadiz	Legislative aide for the Chicago City Council	
Tom Caravette	Candidate for 38th Ward alderman in 2011	
Michael Duda	Former supervisor in the City of Chicago Water Department	
Carmen Hernandez	Inspector in the City of Chicago Water Department	
Jerry Paszek	Co-founder and member of executive board of the Fraternal Order of Police Labor Council	
Heather Sattler	CEO of the 100 Club of Chicago	
Nicholas Sposato	Redistricted incumbent 36th Ward alderman	

Two candidates were removed from the ballot due to insufficient nominating petition signatures or other reasons:

- John J. Cianci
- Mike Keeney

==== Endorsements ====
Heather Sattler

Newspapers

- Chicago Tribune
Nicholas Sposato

Organizations

- Chicago Teachers Union
- Reclaim Chicago
- SEIU Illinois

Newspapers

- Chicago Sun-Times

==== Results ====
38th Ward general election
Party	Candidate	Votes	%
Nonpartisan	Nicholas Sposato (redistricted 36th Ward incumbent)	5,992	53.58
Nonpartisan	Heather Sattler	1,809	16.18
Nonpartisan	Jerry Paszek	1,205	10.78
Nonpartisan	Michael C. Duda	763	6.82
Nonpartisan	Tom Caravette	662	5.92
Nonpartisan	Carmen Hernandez	462	4.13
Nonpartisan	Belinda Cadiz	290	2.59
Total votes		11,183	100

=== 39th Ward ===
Incumbent Alderman Margaret Laurino was reelected. Laurino had first been appointed by Mayor Richard M. Daley in 1994, and had been reelected five times before.

==== Candidates ====
Certified candidates
Name	Experience	Ref
Joe Laiacona	Community member of Roosevelt High School Local School Council, voting member of Northside Democracy For America, and co-founder of the Part-time Faculty Association at Columbia College	
Margaret Laurino	Incumbent alderman	
Robert Murphy	Former president of the Forest Glen Community Association, architect, and photographer	

One candidate was removed from the ballot due to insufficient nominating petition signatures:

- Joaquin Vazquez

==== Endorsements ====
Margaret Laurino

Newspapers

- Chicago Sun-Times
Robert Murphy

Newspapers

- Chicago Tribune

==== Results ====
39th Ward general election
Party	Candidate	Votes	%
Nonpartisan	Margaret Laurino (incumbent)	5,981	53.20
Nonpartisan	Robert Murphy	4,815	42.83
Nonpartisan	Joe Laiacona	446	3.97
Total votes		11,242	100

=== 41st Ward ===
Incumbent first-term alderman Mary O'Connor ran unsuccessfully for reelection, being defeated by Anthony Napolitano in a runoff.

==== Candidates ====
Certified candidates
Name	Experience	Ref
Joe Lomanto	Business owner, chairman of the finance committee for Resurrection Catholic Church	
Anthony Napolitano	Firefighter	
Mary O'Connor	Incumbent alderman	

==== Endorsements ====
First round

Mary O'Connor

Newspapers

- Chicago Sun-Times
- Chicago Tribune

Runoff

Anthony Napolitano

Organizations

- Chicago Teachers Union
- SEIU
Mary O'Connor

Newspapers

- Chicago Sun-Times
- Chicago Tribune

==== Results ====
41st Ward general election
Party	Candidate	Votes	%
Nonpartisan	Mary O'Connor (incumbent)	7,132	47.72
Nonpartisan	Anthony V. Napolitano	6,353	42.51
Nonpartisan	Joe Lomanto	1,459	9.76
Total votes		14,944	100

41st Ward runoff
Party	Candidate	Votes	%
Nonpartisan	Anthony V. Napolitano	9,702	51.64
Nonpartisan	Mary O'Connor (incumbent)	9,087	48.36
Total votes		18,789	100

=== 45th Ward ===
Incumbent first-term Alderman John Arena was reelected, defeating John Garrido in a runoff.

==== Candidates ====
Certified candidates
Name	Experience	Ref
John Arena	Incumbent alderman	
Michelle R. Baert	Blogger, former marketing executive	
Michael S. Diaz	Lawyer	
John Garrido	Chicago police officer	

==== Endorsements ====
John Arena

Organizations

- Chicago Teachers Union
- Reclaim Chicago
- SEIU Illinois

Newspapers

- Chicago Sun-Times
- Chicago Tribune

==== Results ====
45th Ward general election
Party	Candidate	Votes	%
Nonpartisan	John S. Arena (incumbent)	5,914	45.46
Nonpartisan	John Garrido	5,164	39.70
Nonpartisan	Michelle R. Baert	1,726	13.27
Nonpartisan	Michael S. Diaz	204	1.57
Total votes		13,008	100

45th Ward runoff
Party	Candidate	Votes	%
Nonpartisan	John S. Arena (incumbent)	8,488	53.89
Nonpartisan	John Garrido	7,263	46.11
Total votes		15,751	100

== West Side ==
=== 22nd Ward ===
Incumbent Alderman Ricardo Muñoz was reelected. Muñoz had first been appointed by Mayor Richard M. Daley in 1993, and had been reelected five times before.

==== Candidates ====
Certified candidates
Name	Experience	Ref
Neftalie Gonzalez	Business owner	
Robert Martinez		
Raul Montes Jr.	Community activist	
Ricardo Muñoz	Incumbent alderman	

One write-in candidate filed:

- Alex Velazquez

One candidate was removed from the ballot due to insufficient nominating petition signatures:

- Alex Velazquez (subsequently ran as a write-in)

==== Endorsements ====
Ricardo Muñoz

Organizations

- Chicago Teachers Union
- Reclaim Chicago
- SEIU Illinois

Newspapers

- Chicago Sun-Times
- Chicago Tribune

==== Results ====
22nd Ward general election
Party	Candidate	Votes	%
Nonpartisan	Ricardo Muñoz (incumbent)	2,928	57.32
Nonpartisan	Raul Montes, Jr.	887	17.36
Nonpartisan	Neftalie Gonzalez	669	13.10
Nonpartisan	Robert Martinez	595	11.65
Write-in	Alex Velazquez	29	0.57
Total votes		5,108	100

=== 24th Ward ===
Incumbent alderman Michael Chandler did not run for reelection. Michael Scott Jr. was elected to succeed him, defeating Vetress Boyce in a runoff.

==== Candidates ====
Certified candidates
Name	Experience	Ref
Frank M. Bass	Business owner and political consultant	
Vetress Boyce	President and CEO of the Boyce Group	
Ladarius Curtis		
Sherita Ann Harris	United States Postal Service worker	
Wallace “Mickey” Johnson	Businessman and former Chicago Bulls player	
Regina D. Lewis		
Larry G. Nelson		
Michael Scott Jr.	Park manager for the Chicago Park District	
Darren Tillis	Independent insurance agent	
Roger Washington	Chicago Police officer, educator and ordained pastor	

One write-in candidate filed:

- Catrina Singletary-Edwards

One candidate was removed from the ballot due to insufficient nominating petition signatures or other reasons:

- Denarvis Mendenhall

The following candidates filed nominating petitions but withdrew before ballot certification:

- Andre Holland
- Vernell L. Hollis-Swanigan
- Marcus D. Thorne

==== Endorsements ====
Frank M. Bass

Organizations

- Chicago Teachers Union
Michael Scott Jr.

Newspapers

- Chicago Sun-Times
Darren Tillis

Newspapers

- Chicago Tribune

==== Results ====
24th Ward general election
Party	Candidate	Votes	%
Nonpartisan	Michael Scott, Jr.	2,200	31.21
Nonpartisan	Vetress Boyce	1,151	16.33
Nonpartisan	Darren Tillis	1,016	14.42
Nonpartisan	Frank M. Bass	772	10.95
Nonpartisan	Regina D. Lewis	575	8.16
Nonpartisan	Wallace E. Johnson	483	6.85
Nonpartisan	Sherita Ann Harris	382	5.42
Nonpartisan	Ladarius R. Curtis	199	2.82
Nonpartisan	Roger L. Washington	140	1.99
Nonpartisan	Larry G. Nelson	129	1.83
Write-in	Catrina Singletary-Edwards	1	0.01
Total votes		7,048	100

24th Ward runoff
Party	Candidate	Votes	%
Nonpartisan	Michael Scott, Jr.	5,378	67.59
Nonpartisan	Vetress Boyce	2,579	32.41
Total votes		7,957	100.0

=== 25th Ward ===
Incumbent Alderman Daniel Solis was reelected. Solis had first been appointed by Mayor Richard M. Daley in 1996, and had been reelected four times before.

==== Candidates ====
Certified candidates
Name	Experience	Ref
Ed Hershey	Member of the Chicago Commission on Human Relations’ Advisory Council on Latino Affairs, former director of small business development for the City Colleges of Chicago, he worked to strengthen local small businesses, former aide to Congressman Luis Gutiérrez	
Roberto "Beto" Mountain	Teacher	
Jorge Mujica	Nonprofit worker, former journalist	
Bryon Sigcho	Community activist and university professor	
Daniel Solis	Incumbent alderman	

The following candidate filed nominating petitions but withdrew before ballot certification:

- Troy Hernandez (subsequently ran as a write-in)

==== Endorsements ====
Ed Hershey

Organizations

- Chicago Teachers Union
Daniel Solis

Newspapers

- Chicago Sun-Times
- Chicago Tribune
- The Gazette

==== Results ====
25th Ward general election
Party	Candidate	Votes	%
Nonpartisan	Daniel "Danny" Solis (incumbent)	3,811	51.07
Nonpartisan	Byron Sigcho	1,383	18.53
Nonpartisan	Jorge Mujica	907	12.15
Nonpartisan	Roberto "Beto" Montano	748	10.02
Nonpartisan	Ed Hershey	614	8.23
Total votes		7,463	100

=== 27th Ward ===
Incumbent fifth-term Alderman Walter Burnett Jr. was reelected, defeating Gabe Beukinga, his sole challenger.

Incumbent Alderman Daniel Solis was reelected. Solis had first been appointed by Mayor Richard M. Daley in 1996, and had been reelected four times before.

==== Candidates ====
Certified candidates
Name	Experience	Ref
Gabe Beukinga		
Walter Burnett Jr.	Incumbent alderman	

==== Endorsements ====
Walter Burnett Jr.

Organizations

- SEIU Illinois

Newspapers

- Chicago Sun-Times
- Chicago Tribune
- The Gazette

==== Results ====
27th Ward general election
Party	Candidate	Votes	%
Nonpartisan	Walter Burnett, Jr. (incumbent)	6,284	74.06
Nonpartisan	Gabe Beukinga	2,201	25.94
Total votes		8,485	100

=== 28th Ward ===
Incumbent first-term Alderman Jason Ervin was reelected, running unopposed on the ballot, facing only a write-in opponent.

==== Candidates ====
Certified candidates
Name	Experience	Ref
Jason Ervin	Incumbent alderman	

One write-in candidate filed:

- Willie McGill

Six candidates were removed from the ballot due to insufficient nominating petition signatures or other reasons:

- Jasmine Jackson
- Alex M. Lyons
- Willie McGill (subsequently ran as a write-in)
- William Siegmund
- Elliot Thomas
- Tammie Vinson

The following candidate filed nominating petitions but withdrew before ballot certification:

- Marseil Jackson

==== Endorsements ====
Jason Ervin

Organizations

- SEIU Illinois

==== Results ====
28th Ward general election
Party	Candidate	Votes	%
Nonpartisan	Jason C. Ervin (incumbent)	6,278	99.97
Write-in	Willie McGill	2	0.03
Total votes		6,280	100

=== 29th Ward ===
Incumbent alderman Deborah L. Graham unsuccessfully sought reelection. Graham had first been appointed by Mayor Richard M. Daley in 2010, and had been reelected in 2011. She was defeated by Chris Taliaferro in a runoff.

==== Candidates ====
Certified candidates
Name	Experience	Ref
Lawrence Andolino	Former member of the Sayre Language Academy Local School Council, lawyer	
Bob Galhotra	Former president of the Cook County Public Defenders Association, candidate for Illinois 49th State Senate district in 2015	
Deborah L. Graham	Incumbent alderman	
Oddis "O.J" Johnson		
Stephen Robinson		
Zerlina Smith	Former chair of the Chicago Public Schools' Head Start Policy Committee, businesswoman	
Chris Taliaferro	Member of the executive board of Directors of the Northwest Side Community Coalition, lawyer (founding partner at the Nexus Legal Group), former member of the United States Marine Corps, former deputy sheriff of court services with the Cook County Sheriff's Department, former Chicago police officer	
LaCoulton Walls	Former administrative assistant in programs and policy in the area of public safety for the Chicago Mayor's Office	

The following candidates filed nominating petitions but withdrew before ballot certification:

- Lisa Jackson
- Maurice J. Robinson
- Brenda Smith
- Deborah D. Williams

==== Endorsements ====
First round

Lawrence Andolino

Newspapers

- Chicago Tribune
Bob Galhotra

Newspapers

- Chicago Sun-Times
Zerlina Smith

Organizations

- Chicago Teachers Union

Runoff

Deborah Graham

Newspapers

- Chicago Sun-Times
Chris Taliaferro

Newspapers

- Chicago Tribune

==== Results ====
29th Ward general election
Party	Candidate	Votes	%
Nonpartisan	Deborah L. Graham (incumbent)	4,395	40.59
Nonpartisan	Chris Taliaferro	2,435	22.49
Nonpartisan	Lawrence Andolino	1,549	14.31
Nonpartisan	Bob Galhotra	722	6.67
Nonpartisan	Zerlina A. Smith	505	4.66
Nonpartisan	LaCoulton J. Walls	486	4.49
Nonpartisan	Oddis "O.J" Johnson	389	3.59
Nonpartisan	Stephen Robinson	346	3.2
Total votes		10,827	100

29th Ward runoff
Party	Candidate	Votes	%
Nonpartisan	Chris Taliaferro	6,702	51.7
Nonpartisan	Deborah L. Graham (incumbent)	6,262	48.3
Total votes		12,964	100.0

=== 37th Ward ===
Incumbent Alderman Emma Mitts was reelected. Mitts had first been appointed by Mayor Richard M. Daley in 2000, and had subsequently been reelected in 2003, 2007, and 2011. She defeated Tara Stamps in a runoff.

==== Candidates ====
Certified candidates
Name	Experience	Ref
Maretta Brown-Miller	Staff assistant for the Chicago Park District, candidate for 37th Ward alderman in 2011	
Leroy Duncan	President of the 1500 N. Lotus Block Club	
Emma Mitts	Incumbent alderman	
Tara Stamps	Chicago Public Schools teacher, community activist	

One candidate was removed from the ballot:

- Otis Percy

==== Endorsements ====
Emma Mitts

Newspapers

- Chicago Sun-Times
Tara Stamps

Organizations

- Chicago Teachers Union
- Reclaim Chicago

Newspapers

- Chicago Tribune

==== Results ====
37th Ward general election
Party	Candidate	Votes	%
Nonpartisan	Emma M. Mitts (incumbent)	4,033	49.09
Nonpartisan	Tara Stamps	2,640	32.13
Nonpartisan	Maretta Brown-Miller	1,071	13.04
Nonpartisan	Leroy Duncan	472	5.74
Total votes		8,216	100

37th Ward runoff
Party	Candidate	Votes	%
Nonpartisan	Emma M. Mitts (incumbent)	5,340	53.01
Nonpartisan	Tara Stamps	4,734	46.99
Total votes		10,074	100.0

== Southwest Side ==
=== 11th Ward ===
Incumbent alderman James Balcer did not run for reelection. Balcer had first been appointed by Mayor Richard M. Daley in 1997, and had been reelected four times. Patrick Daley Thompson was elected to succeed him, defeating John Kozlar in a runoff.

==== Candidates ====
Certified candidates
Name	Experience	Ref
John Kozlar	Candidate for 11th Ward alderman in 2011	
Maureen F. Sullivan	Business owner	
Patrick Daley Thompson	Metropolitan Water Reclamation District of Greater Chicago commissioner and lawyer	

==== Endorsements ====
Maureen F. Sullivan

Organizations

- Chicago Teachers Union
- Reclaim Chicago
Patrick Daley Thompson

Organizations

- SEIU Illinois

Newspapers

- Chicago Sun-Times
- Chicago Tribune
- The Gazette

==== Results ====
11th Ward general election
Party	Candidate	Votes	%
Nonpartisan	Patrick Daley Thompson	4,644	48.37
Nonpartisan	John K. Kozlar	3,399	35.40
Nonpartisan	Maureen F. Sullivan	1,558	16.23
Total votes		9,969	100

11th Ward runoff
Party	Candidate	Votes	%
Nonpartisan	Patrick Daley Thompson	7,229	58.09
Nonpartisan	John K. Kozlar	5,216	41.91
Total votes		12,445	100.0

=== 12th Ward ===
Incumbent third-term Alderman George Cardenas was reelected, running unopposed on the ballot, with only a write-in opponent.

==== Candidates ====
Certified candidates
Name	Experience	Ref
George Cardenas	Incumbent alderman	

One write-in candidate filed:

- Peter John DeMay

One candidate was removed from the ballot due to insufficient nominating petition signatures:

- Peter John DeMay (subsequently ran as a write-in)

==== Results ====
12th Ward general election
Party	Candidate	Votes	%
Nonpartisan	George Cardenas (incumbent)	3,379	84.14
Write-in	Peter John DeMay	637	15.86
Total votes		4,016	100

=== 13th Ward ===
Incumbent first-term Alderman Marty Quinn was reelected, running unopposed.

==== Candidates ====
Certified candidates
Name	Experience	Ref
Marty Quinn	Incumbent alderman	

==== Results ====
13th Ward general election
Party	Candidate	Votes	%
Nonpartisan	Marty Quinn (incumbent)	10,064	100.00
Total votes		10,064	100

=== 14th Ward ===
Incumbent Alderman Edward M. Burke was reelected, running unopposed. The longest-serving member of the Chicago City Council, Burke had consecutively served eleven full terms, plus a partial term.

==== Candidates ====
Certified candidates
Name	Experience	Ref
Edward M. Burke	Incumbent alderman	

==== Results ====
General election
Party	Candidate	Votes	%
Nonpartisan	Edward M. Burke (incumbent)	5,028	100.00
Total votes		5,028	100

=== 15th Ward ===
Incumbent two-term alderman Toni Foulkes ran in the adjacent 16th ward due to redistricting. Raymond Lopez was elected to succeed her as 15th Ward alderman, defeating Rafael Yanez in a runoff.

==== Candidates ====
Certified candidates
Name	Experience	Ref
Eddie L. Daniels	15th Ward superintendent and former member of the United States Army	
Otis Davis Jr.		
Raymond Lopez	15th Ward Democratic committeeman and candidate for 15th Ward alderman in 2011	
Adolfo Mondragon	Attorney and candidate for Illinois Senate District 1 in 2010 and 2012	
Raul O. Reyes	Nonprofit worker	
Rafael Yanez	Crime prevention specialist for the Chicago Police Department	

==== Endorsements ====
First round

Raymond Lopez

Organizations

- LGBTQ Victory Fund

Newspapers

- Chicago Tribune
Adolfo Mondragon

Newspapers

- Chicago Sun-Times
Rafael Yanez

Organizations

- Chicago Teachers Union

Runoff

Raymond Lopez

Organizations

- LGBTQ Victory Fund

Newspapers

- Chicago Sun-Times
- Chicago Tribune
Rafael Yanez

Rafael Yanez Organizations

- Chicago Teachers Union

==== Results ====
15th Ward general election
Party	Candidate	Votes	%
Nonpartisan	Raymond A. Lopez	2,168	47.65
Nonpartisan	Rafael Yanez	1,007	22.13
Nonpartisan	Otis Davis, Jr.	462	10.15
Nonpartisan	Raul O. Reyes	324	7.12
Nonpartisan	Eddie L. Daniels	309	6.79
Nonpartisan	Adolfo Mondragon	280	6.15
Total votes		4,550	100

15th Ward runoff
Party	Candidate	Votes	%
Nonpartisan	Raymond A. Lopez	3,596	57.98
Nonpartisan	Rafael Yanez	2,606	42.02
Total votes		6,202	100.0

=== 16th Ward ===
Incumbent alderman JoAnn Thompson sought reelection. She was challenged by redistricted incumbent two-term 15th Ward alderman Toni Foulkes and several other candidates. Thompson died two weeks before the general election. Foulkes advanced to a runoff, in which she narrowly defeated Stephanie Coleman.

==== Candidates ====
Certified candidates
Name	Experience	Ref
Stephanie Coleman		
Toni Foulkes	Redistricted incumbent 15th Ward alderman	
Jose Garcia		
Cynthia Lomax		
JoAnn Thompson	Incumbent alderman (died before election)	

Two candidates were removed from the ballot due to insufficient nominating petition signatures:

- Jeffrey L. Lewis
- Guadalupe Rivera

==== Endorsements ====
Stephanie Coleman

Newspapers

- Chicago Sun-Times
Toni Foulkes

Organizations

- Chicago Teachers Union
- SEIU Illinois

Newspapers

- Chicago Tribune

==== Results ====
16th Ward general election
Party	Candidate	Votes	%
Nonpartisan	Toni L. Foulkes (redistricted 15th Ward incumbent)	2,168	47.65
Nonpartisan	Stephanie Coleman	2,096	35.11
Nonpartisan	Jose Garcia	830	13.91
Nonpartisan	Cynthia Lomax	357	5.98
Nonpartisan	JoAnn Thompson (incumbent)^{A}	115	1.93
Total votes		5,969	100

16th Ward runoff
Party	Candidate	Votes	%
Nonpartisan	Toni L. Foulkes (redistricted 15th Ward incumbent)	3,879	50.94
Nonpartisan	Stephanie Coleman	3,736	49.06
Total votes		7,615	100.0

=== 17th Ward ===
Incumbent Latasha Thomas did not run for reelection. Thomas had first been appointed by Mayor Richard M. Daley in 2000, and was elected outright in a 2001 special election, later being reelected three times. David H. Moore was elected to succeed her.

==== Candidates ====
Certified candidates
Name	Experience	Ref
James Dukes	Community leader and pastor	
Glenda Franklin	Founder and executive director of What About the Children Here, staff assistant to Alderman Latasha Thomas, former secretary of the 17th Ward Democratic Organization	
David H. Moore	Assistant commissioner for the Cook County Board of Review	

==== Endorsements ====
James Dukes

Newspapers

- Chicago Tribune
Glenda Franklin

Newspapers

- Chicago Sun-Times
David H. Moore

Organizations

- Chicago Teachers Union
- Reclaim Chicago

==== Results ====
17th Ward general election
Party	Candidate	Votes	%
Nonpartisan	David H. Moore	4,467	52.93
Nonpartisan	Glenda Franklin	3,064	36.30
Nonpartisan	James E. Dukes	909	10.77
Total votes		8,440	100

=== 18th Ward ===
Incumbent alderman Lona Lane unsuccessfully sought reelection. Lane had first been appointed by Mayor Richard M. Daley, and had been reelected in 2007 and 2011. She was defeated by Derrick Curtis in a runoff.

==== Candidates ====
Certified candidates
Name	Experience	Ref
Derrick G. Curtis	Superintendent in the 18th Ward Democratic Committee Organization	
Michael Davis	Founder of the Next Generation Solutions Group, candidate for 18th Ward alderman in 2011	
Cosandra Harris	Former Chicago Police Department officer	
Lona Lane	Incumbent alderman	
Brandon Loggins	Local school council member	
Chuks Onyezia	Lawyer	

Two candidates were removed from the ballot due to insufficient nominating petition signatures:

- Shaakira Ali
- Howard Lindsey

==== Endorsements ====
First round

Chuks Onyezia

Organizations

- Chicago Teachers Union

Newspapers

- Chicago Sun-Times
- Chicago Tribune

Runoff

Derrick Curtis

Newspapers

- Chicago Sun-Times
- Chicago Tribune

==== Results ====
18th Ward general election
Party	Candidate	Votes	%
Nonpartisan	Derrick G. Curtis	3,663	30.25
Nonpartisan	Lona Lane (incumbent)	3,625	29.94
Nonpartisan	Chuks Onyezia	2,139	17.66
Nonpartisan	Michael A. Davis	2,021	16.69
Nonpartisan	Cosandra Harris	351	2.90
Nonpartisan	Brandon Loggins	310	2.56
Total votes		12,109	100

18th Ward runoff
Party	Candidate	Votes	%
Nonpartisan	Derrick G. Curtis	9,843	67.74
Nonpartisan	Lona Lane (incumbent)	4,688	32.26
Total votes		14,531	100.0

=== 23rd Ward ===
Incumbent fifth-term Alderman Michael R. Zalewski was reelected.

==== Candidates ====
Certified candidates
Name	Experience	Ref
Martin Arteaga	Business owner, community development advocate, board member of Latino Organization of the Southwest, committee member of Sigma Lambda Beta Chicago Alumni Network	
Anna Goral	Businesswoman	
Michael R. Zalewski	Incumbent alderman	

Two candidates were removed from the ballot due to insufficient nominating petition signatures:

- Charles M. Hughes
- Paulino R. Villarreal Jr.

==== Endorsements ====
Michael R. Zalewski

Organizations

- Chicago Teachers Union
- SEIU Illinois

Newspapers

- Chicago Sun-Times
- Chicago Tribune

==== Results ====
23rd Ward general election
Party	Candidate	Votes	%
Nonpartisan	Michael R. Zalewski (incumbent)	6,434	66.98
Nonpartisan	Martin Arteaga	1,796	18.70
Nonpartisan	Anna Goral	1,376	14.32
Total votes		9,606	100

== South Side ==
=== 3rd Ward ===
Incumbent second-term Alderman Pat Dowell was reelected, defeating Patricia Horton, her sole challenger.

==== Candidates ====
Certified candidates
Name	Experience	Ref
Pat Dowell	Incumbent alderman	
Patricia Horton	Former Metropolitan Water Reclamation District of Greater Chicago commissioner	

One candidate was removed from the ballot due to insufficient nominating petition signatures:

- Clarence D. Clemons

==== Endorsements ====
Pat Dowell

Organizations

- SEIU Illinois

Newspapers

- Chicago Sun-Times
- Chicago Tribune
- The Gazette

==== Results ====
3rd Ward general election
Party	Candidate	Votes	%
Nonpartisan	Pat Dowell (incumbent)	7,441	72.89
Nonpartisan	Patricia Horton	2,768	27.11
Total votes		10,209	100

=== 4th Ward ===
Incumbent first-term Alderman William D. Burns was reelected.

==== Candidates ====
Certified candidates
Name	Experience	Ref
Tracey Bey	Mortgage broker	
Norman Bolden	Business owner	
William Burns	Incumbent alderman	

One candidate was removed from the ballot due to insufficient nominating petition signatures:

- Jeffrey Booker

==== Endorsements ====
William Burns

Newspapers

- Chicago Sun-Times
- Chicago Tribune
- The Gazette

==== Results ====
4th Ward general election
Party	Candidate	Votes	%
Nonpartisan	William D. Burns (incumbent)	6,353	55.59
Nonpartisan	Tracey Y. Bey	2,862	25.04
Nonpartisan	Norman H. Bolden	2,214	19.37
Total votes		11,429	100

=== 5th Ward ===
Incumbent fourth-term Alderman Leslie Hairston was reelected.

==== Candidates ====
Certified candidates
Name	Experience	Ref
Robin Boyd-Clark	Aromatherapist and life coach	
Tiffany Brooks	Attorney and adjunct university professor	
Jedidiah Brown	President of the Young Leaders Alliance in Chicago	
Leslie Hairston	Incumbent alderman	
Jocelyn Hare	Urban Fellow at the University of Chicago Harris School of Public Policy Studies	
Anne Marie Miles	Attorney	

One write-in candidate filed:

- Loretta Lomax

One candidate was removed from the ballot due to insufficient nominating petition signatures:

- Loretta Lomax (subsequently ran as write-in)

==== Endorsements ====
Leslie Hairston

Organizations

- Chicago Teachers Union
- Reclaim Chicago
- SEIU Illinois

Newspapers

- Chicago Tribune
Anne Marie Miles

Newspapers

- Chicago Sun-Times

==== Results ====
5th Ward general election
Party	Candidate	Votes	%
Nonpartisan	Leslie A. Hairston (incumbent)	5,851	52.51
Nonpartisan	Anne Marie Miles	2,181	19.57
Nonpartisan	Tiffany N. Brooks	891	8.00
Nonpartisan	Jocelyn Hare	821	7.37
Nonpartisan	Jedidiah L. Brown	792	7.11
Nonpartisan	Robin Boyd Clark	599	5.38
Write-in	Loretta Lomax	8	0.07
Total votes		11,143	100

=== 6th Ward ===
Incumbent first-term Alderman Roderick Sawyer was reelected.

==== Candidates ====
Certified candidates
Name	Experience	Ref
Brian Garner	Ward superintendent for Streets and Sanitation and former member of the United States Army	
Roderick Sawyer	Incumbent alderman	
Richard Wooten	Chicago Police Department officer and businessman	

Two write-in candidates filed:

- Susan Davis
- Delton Jerry Pierce

One candidate was removed from the ballot due to insufficient nominating petition signatures:

- Delton Jerry Pierce (subsequently filed as a write-in)

The following candidate filed nominating petitions but withdrew before ballot certification:

- Dumars Ervin Franklin

==== Endorsements ====
Roderick Sawyer

Organizations

- Chicago Teachers Union
- Reclaim Chicago
- SEIU Illinois

Newspapers

- Chicago Sun-Times
- Chicago Tribune

==== Results ====
6th Ward general election
Party	Candidate	Votes	%
Nonpartisan	Roderick T. Sawyer (incumbent)	5,990	56.20
Nonpartisan	Richard A. Wooten	2,800	26.27
Nonpartisan	Brian T. Garner	1,869	17.53
Total votes		10,659	100

=== 7th Ward ===
Incumbent alderman Natashia Holmes unsuccessfully sought reelection. Holmes had been appointed by Mayor Rahm Emanuel in 2013. She was defeated by Gregory Mitchell in a runoff.

==== Candidates ====
Certified candidates
Name	Experience	Ref
Keiana Barrett	Director of strategy for the Office of Family and Community Engagement at Chicago Public Schools	
LaShonda "Shonnie" Curry	Administrator for Chicago Public Schools	
Flora "Flo" Digby	Founder of DfC Financial Associates LLC, college instructor	
Natashia Holmes	Incumbent alderman	
Gregory Mitchell	Information technology manager	
Joseph J. Moseley II	Former Chicago Police Department officer	
Margie Reid	Community organizer and outreach worker	
Bernie Riley	Former computer analyst for the Chicago Mayor's Office	

Two write-in candidates filed:

- Jesse L. Harley
- Chevette A. Valentine

One candidate was removed from the ballot due to insufficient nominating petition signatures:

- Lynn Renee Franco

==== Endorsements ====
First round

Flora "Flo" Digby

Newspapers

- Chicago Sun-Times
LaShonda "Shonnie" Curry

Organizations

- Reclaim Chicago

Newspapers

- Chicago Tribune

Runoff

Gregory Mitchell

Newspapers

- Chicago Sun-Times
- Chicago Tribune

==== Results ====
7th Ward general election
Party	Candidate	Votes	%
Nonpartisan	Natashia L. Holmes (incumbent)	2,642	25.44
Nonpartisan	Gregory I. Mitchell	2,085	20.07
Nonpartisan	Keiana Barrett	1,923	18.51
Nonpartisan	Shonnie Curry	1,333	12.83
Nonpartisan	Flora "Flo" Digby	1,143	11.00
Nonpartisan	Joseph J. Moseley II	761	7.33
Nonpartisan	Margie Reid	362	3.49
Nonpartisan	Bernie Riley	125	1.20
Write-in	Jesse L. Harley	8	0.08
Write-in	Chevette A. Valentine	5	0.05
Total votes		10,387	100

7th Ward runoff
Party	Candidate	Votes	%
Nonpartisan	Gregory I. Mitchell	6,798	56.49
Nonpartisan	Natashia L. Holmes (incumbent)	5,237	43.51
Total votes		12,035	100

=== 8th Ward ===
Incumbent Alderman Michelle A. Harris was reelected. Harris had been first appointed by Mayor Richard M. Daley in 2006, and had been reelected in 2007 and 2011.

==== Candidates ====
Certified candidates
Name	Experience	Ref
Tara F. Baldridge	Former community member of the South East Chicago Chamber of Commerce	
Michelle Harris	Incumbent alderman	
Faheem Shabazz	Barber stylist and real estate consultant	

==== Endorsements ====
Tara F. Baldridge

Organizations

- Reclaim Chicago
Michelle Harris

Newspapers

- Chicago Sun-Times
Faheem Shabazz

Newspapers

- Chicago Tribune

==== Results ====
8th Ward general election
Party	Candidate	Votes	%
Nonpartisan	Michelle A. Harris (incumbent)	9,167	68.53
Nonpartisan	Faheem Shabazz	2,113	15.80
Nonpartisan	Tara F. Baldridge	2,096	15.67
Total votes		13,376	100

=== 20th Ward ===
Second-term incumbent Alderman Willie Cochran was reelected, defeating Kevin Bailey in a runoff.

==== Candidates ====
Certified candidates
Name	Experience	Ref
Brian Garner	Ward superintendent for Streets and Sanitation and former member of the United States Army	
Roderick Sawyer	Incumbent alderman	
Richard Wooten	Chicago Police Department officer and businessman	

One write-in candidate filed:

- Jerome Davis

Two candidates were removed from the ballot due to insufficient nominating petition signatures:

- Jerome A. Davis (subsequently ran as write-in)
- Ronnie D. Nelson

==== Endorsements ====
Kevin Bailey

Newspapers

- Chicago Sun-Times
Wilie Cochran

Organizations

- SEIU Illinois

Newspapers

- Chicago Tribune

==== Results ====
20th Ward general election
Party	Candidate	Votes	%
Nonpartisan	Willie B. Cochran (incumbent)	3,149	47.59
Nonpartisan	Kevin Bailey	1,365	20.63
Nonpartisan	Andre Smith	1,038	15.69
Nonpartisan	Willie Ray, Jr.	672	10.16
Nonpartisan	Ernest Radcliffe, Jr.	390	5.89
Write-in	Jerome Davis	3	0.05
Total votes		6,617	100

20th Ward runoff
Party	Candidate	Votes	%
Nonpartisan	Willie B. Cochran (incumbent)	4,338	55.42
Nonpartisan	Kevin Bailey	3,489	44.58
Total votes		7,827	100

== Far South Side ==
=== 9th Ward ===
Incumbent fourth-term Alderman Anthony Beale was reelected.

==== Candidates ====
Certified candidates
Name	Experience	Ref
Anthony Beale	Incumbent alderman	
Michael Lafargue	President of the West Chesterfield Community Association	
Harold "Noonie" Ward		
Theodore "Ted" Williams	Educator and activist	

One write-in candidate filed:

- Agin Muhammad

Two candidates were removed from the ballot due to insufficient nominating petition signatures:

- Curtiss Llong Bey
- Agin Muhammad II (subsequently ran as write-in)

==== Endorsements ====
Anthony Beale

Newspapers

- Chicago Sun-Times
- Chicago Tribune
Michael Lafargue

Organizations

- Reclaim Chicago

==== Results ====
9th Ward general election
Party	Candidate	Votes	%
Nonpartisan	Anthony A. Beale (incumbent)	7,307	62.42
Nonpartisan	Michael E. Lafargue	1,822	15.56
Nonpartisan	Theodore Williams	1,352	11.55
Nonpartisan	Harold "Noonie" Ward	1,225	10.46
Write-in	Agin Muhammad	1	0.01
Total votes		11,707	100

=== 10th Ward ===
Incumbent fourth-term alderman John Pope unsuccessfully sought reelection. He was defeated by Susan Sadlowski Garza in a runoff by a narrow 20-vote margin (equal to 0.18% of the votes cast in a runoff).

==== Candidates ====
Certified candidates
Name	Experience	Ref
Olga Bautista	Community organizer, local school council parent representative at John L. Marsh School, board member of the Immigrant Defense Alliance, crisis intervention specialist	
Frank J. Corona		
Susan Sadlowski Garza	Area vice president of the Chicago Teachers Union, Chicago Public Schools councilor	
Juan B. Huizar	Accountant	
Richard L. Martinez Jr.	Co-founder of the South Chicago Consortium	
John A. Pope	Incumbent alderman	
Samantha M. Webb	Chicago Police Department officer	

One write-in candidate filed:

- Albert Valentine

==== Endorsements ====
Juan B. Huizar

Newspapers

- Chicago Tribune
Richard L. Martinez Jr.

Newspapers

- Chicago Sun-Times
Susan Sadlowski Garza

Organizations

- Chicago Teachers Union

==== Results ====
10th Ward general election
Party	Candidate	Votes	%
Nonpartisan	John A. Pope (incumbent)	4,181	44.04
Nonpartisan	Susan Sadlowski Garza	2,287	24.09
Nonpartisan	Richard L. Martinez, Jr.	1,191	12.55
Nonpartisan	Juan B. Huizar	809	8.52
Nonpartisan	Samantha M. Webb	510	5.37
Nonpartisan	Frank J. Corona	307	3.23
Nonpartisan	Olga Bautista	208	2.19
Total votes		9,493	100

10th Ward runoff
Party	Candidate	Votes	%
Nonpartisan	Susan Sadlowski Garza	5,825	50.09
Nonpartisan	John A. Pope (incumbent)	5,805	49.91
Total votes		11,630	100.0

As of April 21, Alderman Pope had filed suit for a recount. On May 12, however, Pope conceded defeat to Garza.

=== 19th Ward ===
Incumbent first-term Alderman Matt O'Shea was reelected, defeating Anne Schaible, his sole challenger on the ballot.

==== Candidates ====
Certified candidates
Name	Experience	Ref
Matt O'Shea	Incumbent alderman	
Anne Schaible	Doctor of gynaecology and obstetrics	

One write-in candidate filed:

- Joann Breivogei

==== Endorsements ====
Matt O'Shea

Organizations

- Chicago Teachers Union

Newspapers

- Chicago Sun-Times
- Chicago Tribune

==== Results ====
19th Ward general election
Party	Candidate	Votes	%
Nonpartisan	Matthew J. O'Shea (incumbent)	13,088	72.43
Nonpartisan	Anne Schaible	4,944	27.36
Write-in	Joann Breivogei	1	0.22
Total votes		18,033	100

=== 21st Ward ===
Incumbent third-term Alderman Howard Brookins was reelected, defeating Marvin McNeil in a runoff.

==== Candidates ====
Certified candidates
Name	Experience	Ref
Jeffrey Baker	Army National Guard veteran and community organizer	
Howard Brookins	Incumbent alderman	
Doris Lewis Brooks	Hair salon owner, WVON coordinator, and event planner	
Patricia A. Foster		
Ken Lewis	Business owner, community representative of the Fort Dearborn Elementary Local School Council, administrative officer of the Brainerd Alumni Association	
Marvin McNeil	Retired zoning code inspector for City of Chicago	
Joseph Ziegler Jr.	President and CEO of the Ziegler Insurance Agency and Financial Services Firm, executive director of Community Action Network	

One candidate was removed from the ballot due to insufficient nominating petition signatures:

- CM Winters

==== Endorsements ====
First round

Howard Brookins

Organizations

- SEIU Illinois
Marvin McNeil

Newspapers

- Chicago Tribune
Joseph Ziegler

Newspapers

- Chicago Tribune

Runoff
First round

Howard Brookins

Organizations

- SEIU Illinois
Marvin McNeil

Newspapers

- Chicago Sun-Times
- Chicago Tribune

==== Results ====
21st Ward general election
Party	Candidate	Votes	%
Nonpartisan	Howard B. Brookins, Jr. (incumbent)	5,454	41.57
Nonpartisan	Marvin McNeil	1,838	14.01
Nonpartisan	Doris Lewis Brooks	1,529	11.65
Nonpartisan	Joseph C. Ziegler, Jr.	1,376	10.49
Nonpartisan	Patricia A. Foster	1,365	10.40
Nonpartisan	Ken Lewis	862	6.57
Nonpartisan	Jeffrey Baker	695	5.30
Total votes		13,119	100

21st Ward runoff
Party	Candidate	Votes	%
Nonpartisan	Howard B. Brookins, Jr. (incumbent)	7,574	51.05
Nonpartisan	Marvin McNeil	7,261	48.95
Total votes		14,835	100.0

=== 34th Ward ===
Incumbent Alderman Carrie Austin was reelected. Austin had first been appointed alderman by Mayor Richard M. Daley in 1994, and had subsequently been reelected to five consecutive subsequent terms before this.

==== Candidates ====
Certified candidates
Name	Experience	Ref
Carrie Austin	Incumbent alderman	
Henry Moses		
Charles R. Thomas Sr		
Shirley J. White	President of Racine-Throop 110th Block Club	

==== Endorsements ====
Carrie Austin

Newspapers

- Chicago Sun-Times
- Chicago Tribune

==== Results ====
34th Ward general election
Party	Candidate	Votes	%
Nonpartisan	Carrie M. Austin (incumbent)	7,610	61.22
Nonpartisan	Shirley J. White	2,651	21.33
Nonpartisan	Henry Moses	1,400	11.26
Nonpartisan	Charles R. Thomas, Sr.	769	6.19
Total votes		12,430	100

== See also ==
- Chicago mayoral election, 2015
- United States elections, 2015

== Notes ==
A. ^ Alderman Thompson died on February 9, 2015. She was removed from the ballot the following week, but any early ballots cast for her were still counted.
