= Deborah Graham =

Deborah Graham may refer to:

- Debbie Graham (born 1970), American tennis player
- Deborah L. Graham (born 1966), member of the Chicago City Council
