= Theodore Thomas (alderman) =

American politician

Theodore Thomas was alderman of the 15th ward in Chicago from 1999 to 2007.

== Early life ==
Thomas was born in Houston, Texas, and raised in San Francisco, California. In 1969, Thomas moved to Chicago, and in 1984, he worked as an electronic equipment-repair technician for the U.S. Postal Service.

== Public service ==
After graduating from high school, Thomas enlisted in the U.S. Air Force, in which he served 21 years. When Thomas moved to Chicago he joined ACORN (Association of Community Organizers for Reform Now), which works for social justice and stronger communities. As a member of ACORN, he met all the aldermen and learned how the city worked.

== Aldermanic career ==
Thomas was first elected in 1999. He decided to run when former Alderman Virigl Jones was convicted of corruption charges. There were 11 candidates in the race, but Thomas eventually won in a runoff. As a result of his progressive positions on local issues Thomas received the endorsement of public labor unions, who also assisted his campaign by supplying poll workers on Election Day. After being elected, Alderman Thomas focused his efforts on revitalizing the neighborhoods in his ward by repairing streets, cleaning up vacant lots, and working with the 7th and 8th Chicago Police Districts to reduce street crime and improve relations with the community's residents. Despite a challenging economic climate, Alderman Thomas continued to establish and cultivate small business in the ward.

In 2003, Thomas defeated Bob Love, a former member of the Chicago Bulls. In 2007, Thomas retired from the Chicago City Council for health reasons, and Toni Foulkes, a community activist, ran for the aldermanic seat and was elected thereafter. Thomas counted a new public library and the Churchview Supportive Living Center as two major accomplishments as alderman. Thomas served on six committees: Budget and Government Operations; Committee, Rules and Ethics; Economic, Capital and Technology Development; Health; License and Consumer Protection; and Special Events and Cultural Affairs.

== Personal life ==
Alderman Thomas is married to his wife, Hattie. They have five grown foster children and grandkids. In 2001, Thomas suffered a heart attack and stroke, and had to undergo bypass surgery; he made a full recovery.
