= Irma Cornier =

American community outreach coordinator and activist

Former member of the Latino Advisory Council under Cook County Commissioner Richard Boykin, 1st District
- In office August 17, 2015 – March 26, 2018
- Constituency: 31st Ward, Chicago

Personal details
- Born: Chicago, Illinois
- Party: Democratic
- Education: Columbia College Chicago (B.A.); Loyola University Chicago (M.A.)
- Occupation: Community outreach coordinator
- Website: www.cornierfor31.org

Irma Cornier is a community outreach coordinator and activist in Chicago, Illinois who ran for alderman of the 31st ward in 2015.

== Community activism and political career ==
Irma Cornier is a community outreach and public event coordinator responsible for providing free access services to the predominant Latino population in Chicago for the Belmont Cragin, Hermosa, Chicago, and Humboldt Park, Chicago communities. She volunteered with various homeless programs including "Hot Meals for the Homeless," "Meals in Humboldt Park," and "Outreach to the Homeless ministry". She collected toys, medical supplies, and toiletries for Lydia Home and orphanages both in and out of the country. Furthermore, she has helped several seniors with public assistance programs and aided numerous veterans with their benefits and recognition. She has also conducted community engagements in the Cook County Jail. She was an Aldermanic Graduate Intern for the City of Chicago in 2014 for over six months, a Precinct Coordinator and Poll Watcher for the former 8th District Cook County Commissioner Edwin Reyes in 2014, a volunteer for Illinois Senator William Delgado in 2014, and a Canvasser and Organizer for Mayoral Candidate Pastor Wilfredo de Jesus in 2011. Cornier has been organizing community events in the Belmont Cragin neighborhood for more than a decade. She also works with the Cook County Juvenile Temporary Detention Center.

== Personal life ==
Irma Cornier comes from humble beginnings. A Chicago native, Irma was raised in the Belmont Cragin neighborhood by a family of community-based activists. Irma has been involved with service through her local parish, committing more than 25 years of service, in addition to service for several other organizations. Cornier's cornerstone accomplishment was helping her grandfather to receive his Purple Heart for his services during the Korean War. She worked tirelessly for many years to help him receive this honor, which entailed multiple visits to the V.A., and numerous letters to politicians. In 2014, she earned her M.A. in Social Justice and Community Development from Loyola University in Chicago in just a single year instead of the usual two years. Cornier credits her diligent work ethic and a high set of morals and values to her grandparents, whom she was raised by. Irma writes: "My grandfather taught me diligently that humanity is precious and must be protected and nourished by serving the community and acknowledging the importance of life, regardless of socio-economic background."

== See also ==
- Chicago aldermanic elections, 2015.
