= Dorothy Tillman =

American politician and civil rights activist (born 1947)

City of Chicago Alderman
- In office February 11, 1985 – April 27, 2007
- Preceded by: Tyrone Kenner
- Succeeded by: Pat Dowell
- Constituency: 3rd ward, Chicago (Bronzeville neighborhood)

Personal details
- Born: Dorothy Jean Wright; May 12, 1947 (age 79) Montgomery, Alabama, U.S.
- Party: Democratic
- Spouse: Jimmy Tillman (m. 1966)
- Children: 5
- Occupation: Politician; Civil rights activist

Dorothy Jean Tillman (née Wright; May 12, 1947) is an American politician, civil rights activist and former Chicago, Illinois alderman. Tillman served as the alderman of the city's 3rd ward (map) from 1985 until 2007. A member of the Democratic Party, representing part of the city's South Side in the Chicago City Council. As an Alderman, Tillman was a strong advocate of reparations for slavery. In April 2007, Tillman was defeated in a runoff election by challenger Pat Dowell. Tillman defeated Dowell in 2003. Prior to her career as an alderman, Tillman was active in the Civil Rights Movement, working for Martin Luther King Jr.'s Southern Christian Leadership Conference (SCLC) as an activist. Tillman was known for wearing large hats and has cultivated this image as her trademark.

== Biography ==
=== Civil rights movement ===
Tillman was born as Dorothy Jean Wright in Montgomery, Alabama to James Wright, a local handyman and Edna Mae Struggs (formerly Wright; d. November 30, 2009). Tillman's parents divorced when she was a child which resulted in her spending her childhood between Montgomery with her father and Pensacola, Florida, where her mother had remarried and relocated to. Tillman joined the Southern Christian Leadership Conference (SCLC) as a trainee and field staff organizer in 1963. Tillman marched with Martin Luther King Jr. and was among the SCLC Field Staff to cross the Edmund Pettus Bridge in Selma, Alabama in the Selma to Montgomery marches on 7 March 1965.

Tillman had her first involvement in Chicago politics later in 1965 when King sent her there to campaign for better housing, education and employment conditions for blacks. This campaign marked the start of King's effort to improve socio-economic conditions for blacks. Tillman was involved in organizing King's move into a Chicago tenement in early 1966 and the launch of his campaign in July 1966. By 1967, Tillman and her husband, Jimmy, moved to San Francisco shortly after their marriage and became involved in a successful campaign to improve public transport services to their neighborhood.

Tillman and her husband later returned to Chicago where she became involved in educational issues. Tillman founded the Parent Equalizers of Chicago, which eventually became active in 300 schools across the city, setting the groundwork for school reform in Chicago. The momentum created by several successful grassroots campaigns Tillman helped organize led to the election of Chicago's first African American mayor, Harold Washington in 1983.

=== Chicago Alderman (1985–2007) ===
Dorothy Tillman was appointed by Mayor Harold Washington and later elected as an alderman representing the city's third ward in February 1985, being the first woman elected for that ward. Tillman pioneered the first Tax Increment Financing (TIF) district to be used in the black community, with the construction of the 55th and Dan Ryan shopping center. She helped to found the African American Home Builders Association and advocated for a 70/30 plan to make certain that African Americans received the majority of the contracts.

Amid the Democratic primary of the 1989 Chicago mayoral special election, in which she was supporting Timothy C. Evans, Tillman called incumbent mayor Eugene Sawyer an "Uncle Tom". In July 1988, after months of attacks on him from Tillman, Evans himself, and other allies of Evans such as Bobby Rush, Sawyer retaliated by stripping them of their committee chairmanships in a City Council restructuring. In this, Tillman was removed as chairman of the Housing Committee.

In 2000, Tillman requested that two waiters at the Palmer House hotel in Chicago be replaced with African-American waiters for a banquet hosted by Alderman Tillman. Chicago mayor Richard M. Daley delivered a strongly worded rebuke in the media.

Tillman was an advocate of reparations for slavery and was successful in having a number of resolutions passed in support of the concept. She authored a bill, passed unanimously in 2002, forcing companies who perform contracts with the council to declare any past ties with slavery. In early 2005, Tillman led a campaign against a $500 million (~$769 million in 2024) refinancing deal with the Bank of America because of its alleged links with slavery. In the case of the Bank of America, these links are allegedly through FleetBoston Financial, a company which it acquired in 2004. Providene, a predecessor of Fleet Boston, was supposedly founded by a slave owner in 1791.

During one loud session of the City Council, Tillman gained the attention of the entire floor when she produced a pistol from her handbag and brandished it about. This led some aldermen and Chicago citizens to call for a censure on Tillman's professional ethics, and possible mandatory gun safety training.

Tillman has been involved in the Harold Washington Cultural Center (HWCC) since its inception. A 2006 three-part investigative report by the Chicago local paper Lakefront Outlook reported accounting irregularities and conflicts of interest by Tillman and her family. Despite the controversy and his stand on ethics reform, U.S. Senator Barack Obama endorsed Tillman in her 2007 election noting she was an early supporter of his.

Although she had the backing of Chicago's Mayor Richard Daley, Tillman was not able to achieve a majority of votes in Chicago's non-partisan aldermanic election in February 2007. As a result, Tillman stood in a runoff election against challenger Pat Dowell. Dowell took 54 percent of the vote to 46 percent for Tillman. During a heated debate between Tillman and Dowell on April 3, 2007, Dowell charged Tillman with failing to produce business growth beyond the street corner where her ward office was located and stated "I will be the change agent," after which Tillman's daughter (and political staffer) shouted out "A white man agent!"

== Personal ==
Tillman has been married once and has five children. Tillman married Jimmy Lee Tillman, a musician circa 1967. Together they had five children including Jimmy Lee Tillman Jr. (b. 1968) who ran for U.S. Congress in 2014, and Ebony Tillman who challenged third ward alderman Pat Dowell in 2011. In October 2008 Tillman was convicted for criminal trespassing at an Alabama hospital in March 2008. A dispute over medical records escalated and the police were called. Tillman claims she was brutalized by the police. She was fined and received a suspended sentence. Her lawyer stated that an appeal is planned. The charge was eventually dropped as part of a settlement with the hospital.

== See also ==
- List of Chicago aldermen since 1923
