= Anthony Napolitano =

American politician

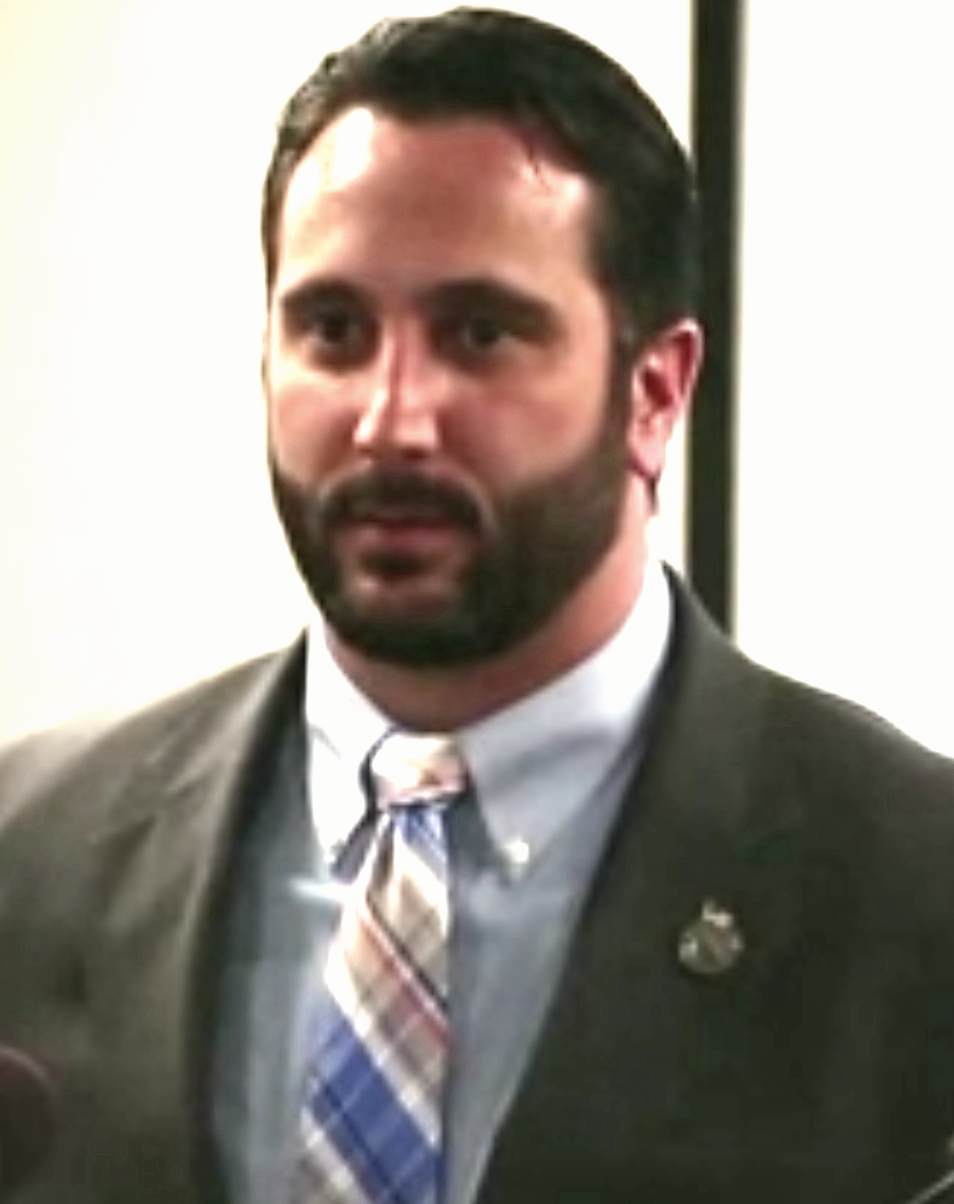

Member of the Chicago City Council from the 41st ward
- Incumbent
- Assumed office May 18, 2015
- Preceded by: Mary O'Connor

Personal details
- Born: March 29, 1975 (age 51) Chicago, Illinois, U.S.
- Party: Independent
- Other political affiliations: Republican (formerly)
- Spouse: Jamie O'Shaughnessy
- Children: 3
- Education: Calumet College (BA)

Anthony V. Napolitano (born March 29, 1975) is the current Alderman for Chicago's 41st ward, located on the Northwest side and including Edison Park, Norwood Park, Oriole Park, O'Hare and Edgebrook.

== Early life and career ==
Napolitano worked as a Chicago police officer from 2000 to 2005, and later as a Chicago firefighter.

== Aldermanic career ==
Napolitano was elected as the 41st ward alderman in 2015, unseating incumbent alderman Mary O'Connor. He was reelected in 2019 and 2023.

He is a member of the following committees: Aviation, Committees, Rules and Ethics, Human Relations, Pedestrian and Traffic Safety, Public Safety and Transportation and Public Way. He was a member of the now inactive Joint Committee on Finance-Public Safety.

In the runoff of the 2019 Chicago mayoral election, Napolitano joined Chicago Firefighters Union Local 2 in endorsing Lori Lightfoot.

In November 2019, Napolitano was one of fifteen aldermen to oppose a $72 million property tax increase in Mayor Lori Lightfoot's first budget that included $7 million in funding for City Colleges, $32 million in funding to retire a general obligation bond issue and $18 million in funding for libraries. However, he voted for the budget as a whole.

=== Party affiliation ===
Napolitano's party affiliation at various times has been reported as either Republican or as unaffiliated with a political party. Illinois does not have party registration, Illinois holds open primary elections, and members of the Chicago City Council are elected in nonpartisan elections. This makes party affiliation a matter of self-identification. Napolitano identifies as an independent.

== Personal life ==
Napolitano is married to Jamie O’Shaughnessy and they have 3 children.

== See also ==
- List of Chicago alderpersons since 1923
