= Camille Lilly =

American politician

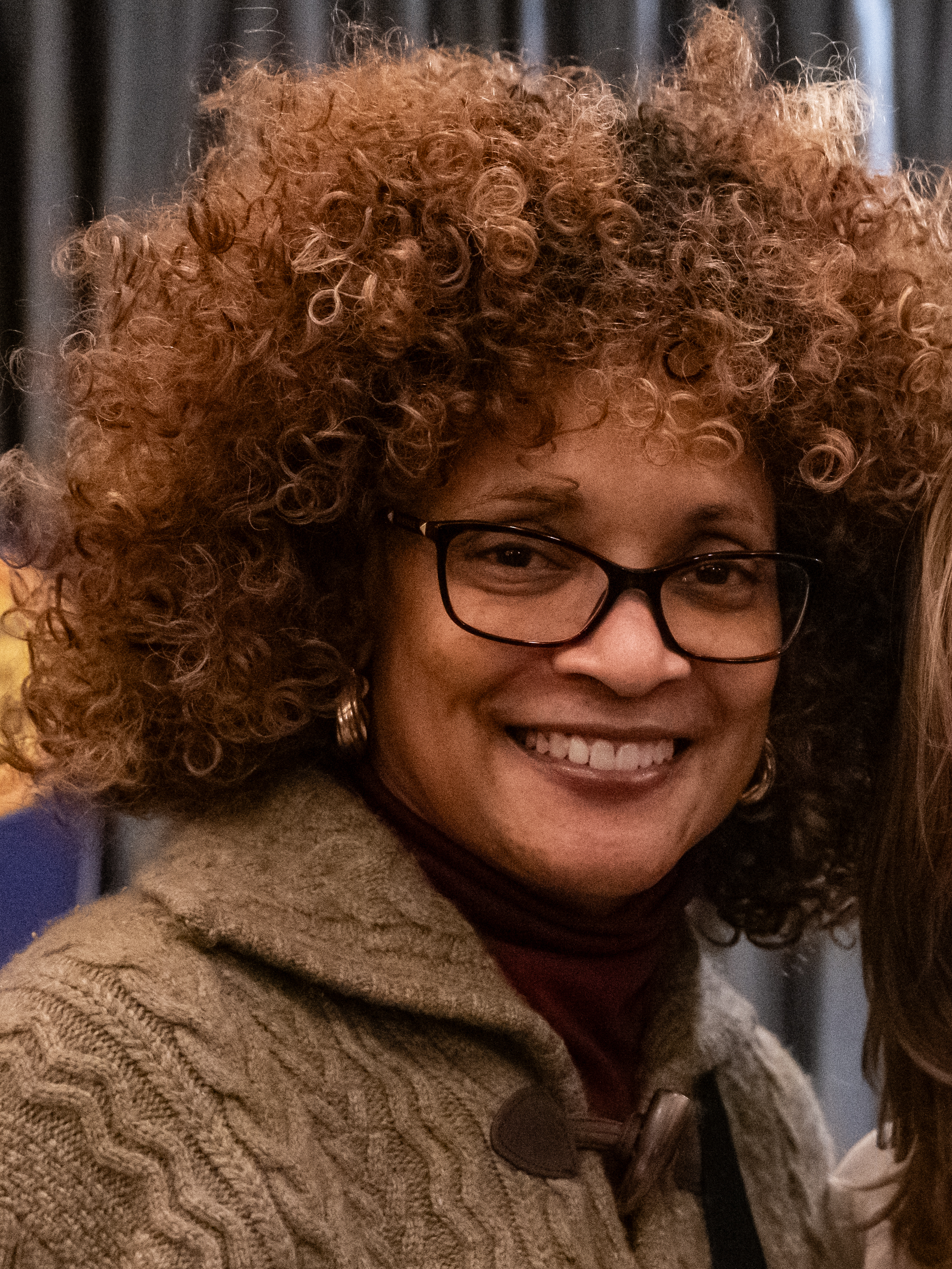

Member of the Illinois House of Representatives from the 78th district
- Incumbent
- Assumed office April 27, 2010
- Preceded by: Deborah L. Graham

Personal details
- Party: Democratic
- Education: Drake University (BS); University of Oklahoma (MHA)
- Website: Official website

Camille Y. Lilly is a Democratic member of the Illinois House of Representatives from the 78th district. The district includes the Austin neighborhood in Chicago and parts of the suburbs of Elmwood Park, Franklin Park, Oak Park, and River Grove.

== Profile ==
She has been Vice President for External Affairs and Development at Loretto Hospital, Vice President of BethAnneLife Centre at Bethel New Life and Executive Director of the Austin Chamber of Commerce.

== Illinois House of Representatives ==
On March 24, 2010, Deborah L. Graham resigned from the Illinois House of Representatives to accept an appointment to the Chicago City Council. Local Democratic leaders nominated Lilly to succeed Graham. Lilly was sworn into office on April 27, 2010.

On July 13, 2010, Lilly was appointed a member of the Illinois Early Learning Council for a term ending July 13, 2013. The Council is tasked with coordinating existing programs and services for children from birth to 5 years of age in order to better meet the early learning needs of children and their families. Lilly is also a member of the Medicaid Managed Care Oversight Task Force. The Task Force was established to monitor how the State approaches and manages a new form of health care delivery system based on managed care models, particularly for people with disabilities and the elderly.

In 2018, Democrat J. B. Pritzker appointed Lilly a member of the gubernatorial transition's Healthy Children and Families Committee.

As of July 3, 2022, Representative Lilly is a member of the following Illinois House committees:

- (Chairwoman of) Appropriations - Human Services Committee (HAPH)
- Appropriations - Public Safety Committee (HAPP)
- Fair Lending and Community Reinvestment Committee (HFIN-FAIR)
- (Chairwoman of) Financial Impact Subcommittee (HMAC-IMPA)
- Financial Institutions Committee (HFIN)
- Health Care Availability & Access Committee (HHCA)
- Insurance Committee (HINS)
- Labor & Commerce Committee (HMAC)
- (Chairwoman of) Museums, Arts, & Cultural Enhancement Committee (HMAC)
- Wages & Rates Subcommittee (HAPH-WAGE)
