= Felix Cardona Jr. =

American politician

Felix Cardona

Member of the Chicago City Council from the 31st ward
- Incumbent
- Assumed office May 20, 2019
- Preceded by: Milly Santiago

Personal details
- Born: 1974 or 1975 (age 51–52)
- Party: Democratic
- Education: Northeastern University (BS)

Felix Cardona Jr. (born 1974/1975) is a Democratic member of the Chicago City Council representing the 31st Ward.

== Political career ==
Cardona was elected alderman from the 31st Ward of Chicago in 2019, unseating incumbent alderman Milly Santiago.

Cardona assumed office as alderman on May 20, 2019. He is currently a member of the Latino Caucus. He was a member of the Progressive Reform Caucus during the 2019-23 term, but did not join it after the 2023 election. Cardona is affiliated with the Democratic Party.

=== Criticism from LGBTQ Victory Fund ===
The LGBTQ Victory Fund, which is a national organization that promotes LGBTQ politicians being elected, criticized Cardona for "homophobic comments" made to his fellow 31st Ward alderman candidate Colin Bird-Martinez who the LGBTQ Victory Fund endorsed. He was also criticized for receiving benefits from Maranatha USA/Maranatha Word Revival which they claim is a "anti-LGBTQ religious organization".

=== Elections ===
==== 2019 ====
General runoff election for Chicago City Council Ward 31, April 2
| Party | Candidate | Votes | % | ±% |
|---|---|---|---|---|
| Nonpartisan | Felix Cardona, Jr. | 3,584 | 54.3% | |
| Nonpartisan | Milagros Santiago | 3,017 | 45.7% | |

General election for Chicago City Council Ward 31, February 26
| Party | Candidate | Votes | % | ±% |
|---|---|---|---|---|
| Nonpartisan | Milagros Santiago | 2,588 | 40.3% | |
| Nonpartisan | Felix Cardona, Jr. | 2,132 | 33.2% | |
| Nonpartisan | Colin Bird-Martinez | 1,699 | 26.5% | |

== See also ==
- List of Chicago alderpersons since 1923
