= Stephanie Coleman =

American politician

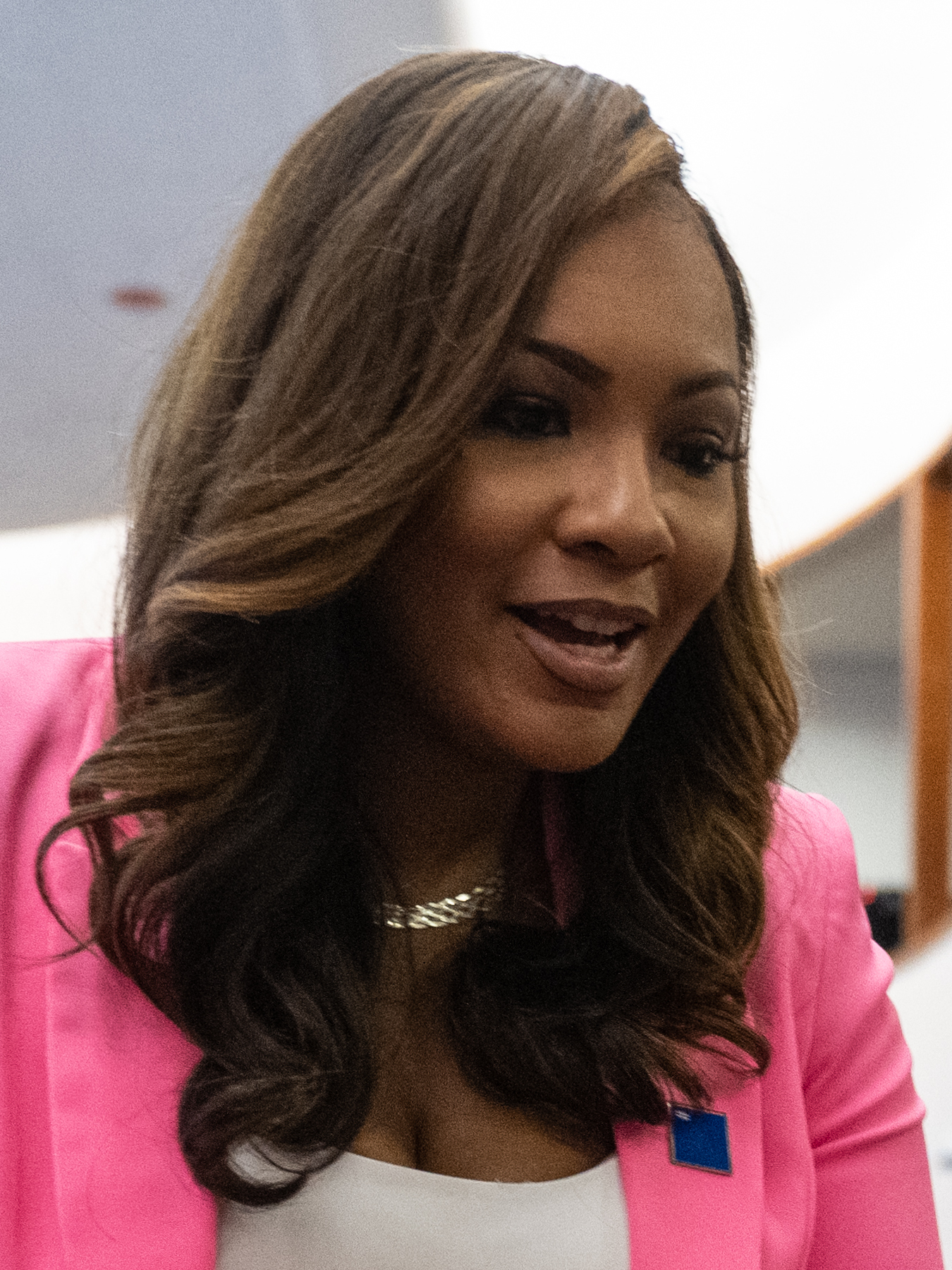

Member of the Chicago City Council from the 16th ward
- Incumbent
- Assumed office May 20, 2019
- Preceded by: Toni Foulkes

Personal details
- Born: April 13, 1988 (age 38) Chicago, Illinois, U.S.
- Party: Democratic
- Education: Robert Morris University (BA); Spertus Institute (MA)

Stephanie D. Coleman (born April 13, 1988) is a Chicago politician. Coleman is the current alderman of Chicago's 16th ward, taking office as a member of the Chicago City Council in May 2019. She defeated incumbent alderman Toni Foulkes in the 2019 Chicago aldermanic elections. She is also the Democratic Party Committeeman in the 16th ward. Since June 2023, she has been the chair of the Chicago Aldermanic Black Caucus.

== Early life and career ==
Coleman was born on April 13, 1988. She is the daughter of Shirley Coleman, who as an alderman for the Englewood area from 1991 to 2007. Due to this background she has sometimes used the nickname "Daughter of Englewood." She attended Emannuel Christian School and Chicago Military Academy High School, and later received her B.A. in business management from Robert Morris University and her M.S. in non-profit management from Spertus Institute of Jewish Studies.

Since 2016, she has been City Vice-Chair in the Cook County Young Democrats. Prior to being elected to office, she also served as an aide to Cook County Commissioner Dennis Deer. She first ran for office in the 2015 Chicago aldermanic election against Toni Foulkes, and lost by a narrow margin in the run-off election. She challenged Foulkes again in 2019, and this time won with 67% of the vote in the run-off.

== Chicago City Council (2019–present) ==
Coleman took office on May 20, 2019. She is a member of the Black Caucus and formerly of the Progressive Caucus of the City Council. In 2025, Coleman introduced an ordinance requiring sailors on Lake Michigan to wear mandatory life jackets whilst out on the water. Later in the year, she received criticism for attending the Gospel Music Awards in Nashville, Tennessee wearing designer clothing whilst her district was facing heavy flooding in storms.

== See also ==
- List of Chicago alderpersons since 1923
