= Mary O'Connor (Illinois politician) =

Member of the Chicago City Council from the 41st ward
- In office May 2011 – May 2015
- Preceded by: Brian Doherty
- Succeeded by: Anthony Napolitano

Personal details
- Born: 1959 (age 66–67)

Mary E. O'Connor (born 1959) is a former Chicago city alderman. She was the first female alderman to represent the 41st Ward of Chicago on the Northwest side of the city - the largest geographic ward in Chicago including O'Hare International Airport. She was elected with 50.88% of the total vote on April 5, 2011 in a runoff election, replacing outgoing alderman Brian Doherty.

Mary O'Connor is also the owner of Unforgettable Edibles and O'Connor's Deli and Market in the 41st Ward.

Mary O'Connor served the 41st Ward as Democratic Ward Committeeman from 2008 to 2015.

O'Connor lost reelection as alderman to Anthony Napolitano in 2015.

After losing reelection, O'Connor was later hired by mayor Rahm Emanuel to work as the city's deputy commissioner in Planning and Development.
