= Ray Suarez (politician) =

Puerto Rican politician (born 1946)

6th Vice Mayor of Chicago
- In office May 16, 2011 – May 20, 2015
- Mayor: Rahm Emanuel
- Preceded by: Bernard Stone
- Succeeded by: Brendan Reilly

Chicago Alderman from the 31st Ward
- In office 1991–2015
- Preceded by: Raymond Figueroa
- Succeeded by: Milly Santiago

Personal details
- Born: Regner E. Suárez; October 26, 1946 (age 80) Yauco, Puerto Rico

Military service
- Allegiance: United States of America
- Branch/service: United States Marine Corps
- Battles/wars: Vietnam War

Regner E. "Ray" Suárez (born October 26, 1946) is the former alderman of the 31st Ward of the City of Chicago; he was first elected in 1991. He was unsuccessful in the April 2015 election, and left office the next month.

In November 2015, he was appointed to a position on the Illinois International Port District Authority.

== Personal life ==
Suárez was born in Yauco, Puerto Rico. He enlisted in the United States Marine Corps at the age of 19 during the Vietnam War era. He and his wife, Marta, live in the Cragin neighborhood.

== Early career ==
Suárez held various city jobs before becoming alderman. He worked for Streets and Sanitation, in the mayor's office as an Administrative Assistant working with Development Action Grants, and Assistant Commissioner of Department of Street and Sanitation.

In 1989, he was appointed to the Illinois Job Training Coordinating Council, where he advised the governor how to spend the budget for job-training.

== Aldermanic career ==
Suárez was elected alderman in 1991. He was reelected in 1995, 1999, 2003, 2007, and 2011. He lost reelection in 2015 to Milly Santiago.

He was the chairman of Housing and Real Estate, and sits on seven other committees: Aviation, Budget and Government Operations, Buildings, Finance, Transportation and the Public Way, and Zoning.

The alderman has proposed that private businesses such as bars be required to install police surveillance cameras on their premises. "If you're not doing anything wrong, what do you have to worry about?" he demanded, in response to privacy concerns.

From May 2011 until May 2015, Suarez was also Chicago's Vice Mayor.
