= Brian K. Hopkins =

American politician

Brian Hopkins
- Alderman Brian Hopkins official headshot

Member of the Chicago City Council from the 2nd ward
- Incumbent
- Assumed office May 18, 2015
- Preceded by: Bob Fioretti

Personal details
- Born: November 8, 1961 (age 65) Fort Huachuca, Arizona, U.S.
- Spouse: Colleen
- Education: University of Illinois, Springfield (BA)

Brian K. Hopkins (born November 8, 1961) is an Alderman of Chicago, representing the 2nd ward. The 2nd Ward includes Streeterville, Old Town, Lincoln Park, and the Gold Coast. Prior to his election to the Chicago City Council, he served as Chief of Staff to Cook County Commissioner John P. Daley.

== Early life ==
Hopkins was born in Fort Huachuca, Arizona while his father served in the United States Army. His parents were natives of Chicago's McKinley Park neighborhood, and returned there shortly after his birth.

== Personal life ==
Hopkins resides in the Lincoln Park neighborhood with his wife and son.

== City Council ==
Hopkins is the Chair of the Committee on Public Safety. He is a member of the following committees: Committees on Aviation; Committees and Rules; Finance; Pedestrian and Traffic Safety; Special Events, Cultural Affairs and Recreation; Transportation and Public Way; and Zoning, Landmarks and Building Standards.

In November 2019, Hopkins was one of fifteen aldermen to oppose a $72 million property tax increase in Mayor Lori Lightfoot's first budget that included $7 million in funding for City Colleges, $32 million in funding to retire a general obligation bond issue and $18 million in funding for libraries. However, he voted for the budget as a whole.

=== Environmental initiatives ===
Beginning in 2019, Hopkins introduced legislation proposing bird-friendly building design standards for new developments in Chicago, intended to reduce collisions involving migratory birds. The proposal did not advance before the conclusion of the 2019–2023 City Council term. In 2026, Hopkins joined Alderman Maria Hadden in co-sponsoring renewed legislation concerning bird-friendly building design standards, designated O2026-0024083. In 2021, Hopkins sponsored legislation establishing Chicago's Native and Pollinator Garden Registry. The ordinance, unanimously approved by the Chicago City Council, created a voluntary registration program for qualifying native and pollinator gardens. The registry was designed to distinguish intentionally maintained native landscapes from properties violating the city's weed ordinance and to support urban biodiversity and pollinator habitat. Hopkins worked with community gardening and conservation organizations during the development of the legislation. In May 2026, the City Council unanimously approved an amendment to the Native and Pollinator Garden Registry ordinance allowing registered parkway gardens to contain plants up to 36 inches tall, increasing the previous 10-inch limit. Hopkins, the original ordinance's lead sponsor, supported the amendment to accommodate native plant species such as milkweed and purple coneflower. The registry began accepting applications in 2026, following the establishment of an advisory board responsible for developing registration criteria.

=== Public safety and criminal justice ===
As Chair of the Chicago City Council Committee on Public Safety, Hopkins has presided over hearings concerning public safety and criminal justice policy. He co-sponsored legislation concerning the creation of the Chicago–Cook County Task Force to Reduce Violence Against Women, an initiative examining systemic challenges faced by survivors of domestic violence and opportunities to improve coordination between government agencies and the court system. In July 2026, the City Council Committee on Public Safety held hearings examining a report issued by the task force concerning the experiences of domestic violence survivors navigating the Cook County court system. The report identified challenges including fragmented court proceedings, limited information sharing between judges, and the financial and emotional burdens associated with prolonged litigation. The task force recommended improvements to coordination, transparency, and information sharing across the court system.

== Electoral history ==
Chicago 2nd ward aldermanic general election, 2015
Party	Candidate	Votes	%
Nonpartisan	Brian Hopkins	2,889	28.98
Nonpartisan	Alyx Pattison	2,404	24.11
Nonpartisan	Bita Buenrostro	1,411	14.15
Nonpartisan	Stephen Niketopoulos	1,232	12.36
Nonpartisan	Stacey Pfingsten	1,170	11.74
Nonpartisan	Cornell Wilson	863	8.66
Total votes		9,969	100

Chicago 2nd ward aldermanic runoff election, 2015
Party	Candidate	Votes	%
Nonpartisan	Brian Hopkins	7,597	56.63
Nonpartisan	Alyx Pattison	5,819	43.37
Total votes		13,416	100

Chicago 2nd ward aldermanic general election, 2019
Party	Candidate	Votes	%
Nonpartisan	Brian Hopkins (incumbent)	10,977	99.96
Nonpartisan	Mollie May Brady (write-in)	3	0.03
Nonpartisan	Richard Benedict Mayers (write-in)	1	0.01
Total votes		10,981	100

Chicago 2nd ward aldermanic general election, 2023
Party	Candidate	Votes	%
Nonpartisan	Brian Hopkins (incumbent)	11,200	100
Total votes		11,200	100

== See also ==
- List of Chicago alderpersons since 1923
