= Isaac Carothers =

American alderman

Isaac "Ike" Sims Carothers is a former alderman of the 29th Ward on the far west side of the City of Chicago. He was first elected in 1999. He resigned in 2010 after pleading guilty to federal corruption charges.

== Family and early life ==
Carothers grew up in Chicago where he attended public elementary school and then De La Salle High School. He earned a degree in Political Science from DePaul University and his Masters in Criminal Justice from Chicago State University.

Both Carothers' father and grandfather were city employees active in local politics. Isaac's grandfather, Isaac "Ike" Sims, was a Department of Sewers employee, Illinois State Representative and 28th Ward committeeman. Isaac's father, William Carothers, was a Streets and Sanitation ward superintendent. William Carothers replaced his father-in-law, Isaac "Ike" Sims as committeeman in 1976.

While alderman, William Carothers and his assistant Ozzie Hutchins threatened to block a $14.5 million Bethany Hospital expansion unless they received $15,000 worth of remodelling in their ward office. Both William Carothers and Hutchins were convicted of conspiracy and extortion on August 23, 1983. William Carothers was sentenced to three years in the federal prison in Terre Haute, Indiana and was defeated in his next election in the 28th Ward by Ed Smith in a run-off in early 1983.

== Early career ==
Isaac and his brother were both Cook County deputy sheriffs. In 1985, a federal judge ordered William Carothers, his two sons, and a fourth man to pay $152,000 in damages for a campaign of physical violence and intimidation organized by William Carothers, from prison, against a political opponent, independent incumbent State Representative Arthur Turner of the far west side 17th District who had challenged William Carothers' former assistant, Ozzie Hutchins. Turner's aides were threatened with guns and one aide suffered severe injuries to the side of his head and broken bones. Turner and his aides filed a civil lawsuit following their election defeat by Hutchins. U.S. District Judge Charles Kocoras said Isaac Carothers appeared to be the ringleader and "organized their acts of intimidation" by force, while his brother used his deputy's position to verbally threaten the plaintiffs. Isaac Carothers was ordered to pay $25,000 damages.

Isacc Carothers worked for the Cook County Defender's Office. In 1989, he was hired as a Superintendent for the Department of Water. Carothers was hired as Director of Internal Audit for the Chicago Park District in 1993 and named Deputy Commissioner of Streets and Sanitation in 1997.

== Aldermanic career ==
Carothers was elected alderman in 1999 after defeating eight opponents, including the incumbent, Alderman Sam Burrell, in a February first round, and a ninth opponent, Floyd Thomas, in an April run-off.

Carothers highlighted a new police station, a senior housing development, a movie theater, and new restaurants as some of his accomplishments.

Carothers served on five committees: Committees, Rules and Ethics, Finance, Aviation, Special Events and Cultural Affairs Transportation and the Public Way. Just two years after being elected alderman, Carothers was appointed chairman of the city council's Police and Fire Committee.

Carothers' name appeared more often than any other alderman's on a list of clouted job-seekers and their political sponsors unveiled by federal prosecutors in June 2006 during the trial of patronage chief Robert Sorich.

In 2008, Carothers was one of seven Chicago aldermen who between them got ten of their children good-paying summer jobs with the Metropolitan Water Reclamation District of Greater Chicago.

In 2008, Carothers paid a relative more than $30,000 from a taxpayer-funded payroll account available to aldermen without scrutiny. "All of us (aldermen) have family members on the payroll," said Carothers, while declining to clarify if the William Carothers on his payroll was his father or his brother, both named William.

=== Indictment, cooperation with FBI, conviction, and resignation ===
In 2007, Carothers accepted $11,000 in campaign contributions from a real-estate developer seeking zoning changes who was cooperating with the Federal Bureau of Investigation.

In 2007, the office of the United States Attorney for the Northern District of Illinois Patrick Fitzgerald subpoenaed Carothers demanding documents including seven years worth of aldermanic expense records; 29th Ward zoning changes; ordinances introduced by Carothers, and correspondence between Carothers and the mayor's office regarding zoning changes. The subpoena further demanded information on comments made and votes taken by Carothers since January 2001 before two city council committees.

Beginning in early 2008, and for more than a year, Carothers worked undercover with the FBI and secretly wore a wire. Carothers was a member of the city council's Aviation Committee, whose duties include approving contracts at the airports. Carothers rented space for his ward office from one of the companies of local businessman Wafeek "Wally" Aiyash. Carothers wore a hidden microphone and a video camera to secretly capture his meetings with Aiyash in June 2008. Aiyash gave Carothers $9,000, and offered a $100,000 bribe, Aiyash thought Carothers could help him open five restaurants in Chicago's two airports. The federal charges against Aiyash alleged that Aiyash had a corrupt relationship with Carothers before the alderman began cooperating with federal authorities.

The US Attorney's office in Chicago indicted Carothers on federal corruption charges on May 28, 2009. Galewood Yards was a 50-acre (200,000 m^{2}) former rail-yard and industrial site in the 29th Ward on the city's west side, the largest undeveloped tract of land within city limits. Real-estate developer Calvin Boender sought to transform the site into a mixed-use residential and commercial project. Boender paid for approximately $40,000 in home improvements to Carothers' residence and provided him with meals and tickets to professional sporting events, which Carothers illegally accepted, in exchange for Carothers' official acts supporting successful zoning changes for the project. Carothers and Boender were indicted on federal fraud and bribery charges. Carothers was charged with four counts of wire or mail fraud and one count each of accepting a bribe and filing a false federal income tax return. The indictment also sought forfeiture of at least $40,000 from Carothers, representing the financial benefits he received in home improvements. Carothers also asked Boender to donate to the campaign of Carothers' aunt, Anita Rivkin-Carothers, who unsuccessfully ran for Congress in 2004, and Boender enlisted two others to give contributions on his behalf. Boender and his associates donated about $55,000 to Carothers, according to campaign-contribution records. On March 18, 2010, a federal jury convicted Boender on five counts including bribing Carothers for a zoning change.

Carothers initially pleaded not guilty at his arraignment in federal court on Monday, June 8, 2009. A plea deal called for prosecutors to drop four wire and mail fraud charges. On February 1, 2010, Carothers pleaded guilty to one count of failing to report the home improvements on his income taxes and to one count of corruptly accepting items of value for supporting the zoning change for the Boender project. Carothers agreed to a 28-month prison term, continued cooperation with prosecutors, and $40,000 in restitution. Under state law, the guilty plea requires that Carothers' city council seat be vacated immediately, and hours after entering the plea, Carothers resigned from the city council in a letter to Mayor Richard M. Daley.

Father William and son Isaac were convicted of almost the same crimes three decades apart, described as "...perhaps the most striking combination of aldermanic nepotism combined with Chicago-style corruption..." by the Chicago Tribune. William's was the eleventh, and Isaac's, the 28th, conviction of a Chicago alderman since 1972.

Isaac Carothers was released from prison in March 2012.

== Candidate for Cook County Board of Commissioners ==
Carothers announced his candidacy for the office of Commissioner on the Cook County Board at a meeting of the 37th Ward Democratic Organization. Carthers' candidacy is supported by Alderman Emma Mitts of the 37th Ward. On November 25, 2013, Carothers filed nominating petitions to get on the March 2014 primary ballot. Cook County Board President Toni Preckwinkle said she would not support Carother's candidacy. "It takes a special sort of chutzpah to run for public office after doing time for public corruption," the Chicago Tribune editorialized.

== Personal life ==
Alderman Carothers is married to his wife Sharron, and they have two sons, Sherman and Matthew. Carothers attends Original Providence Baptist Church on Chicago's west side.

Carothers' aunt, Anita Rivkin-Carothers, is currently a judge on the Circuit Court of Cook County in the domestic violence court. As an attorney, Rivkin-Carothers represented white supremacist Matthew F. Hale before the Illinois Supreme Court, defended Gangster Disciples leader Larry Hoover in federal court, and represented Tina Olison in her custody battle with Alderman Edward M. Burke and his wife Anne over Olison's child "Baby T". In 2004 Rivkin-Carothers unsuccessfully challenged incumbent US Representative of the 7th Congressional District Danny K. Davis.
