= Chris Taliaferro =

American politician

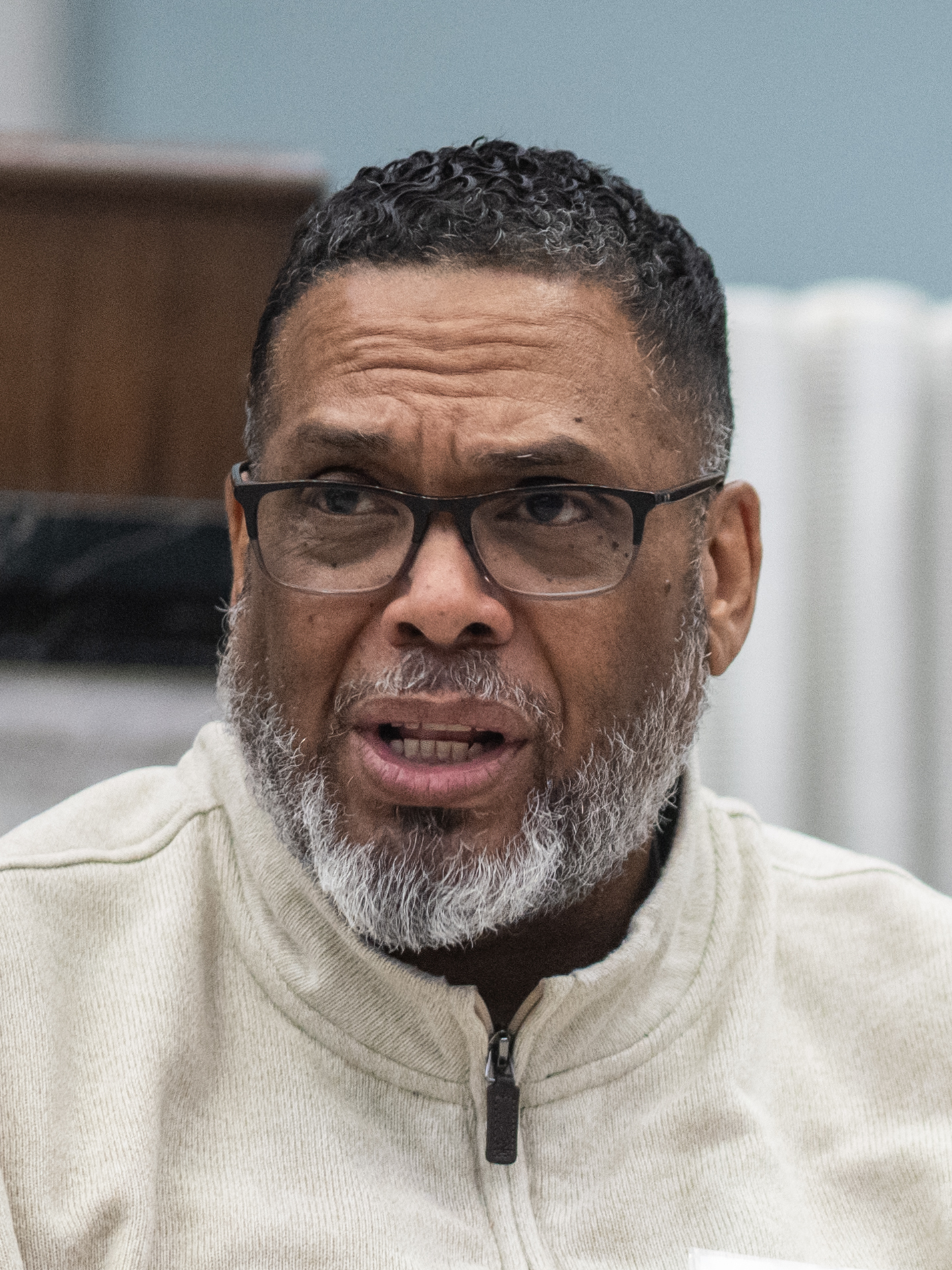
- Taliaferro in 2025

Member of the Chicago City Council from the 29th ward
- Incumbent
- Assumed office May 18, 2015
- Preceded by: Deborah L. Graham

Personal details
- Born: December 9, 1965 (age 60) Smithfield, Virginia, U.S.
- Party: Democratic
- Spouse: Melissa
- Children: 3
- Education: Lewis University (BA); John Marshall Law School, Chicago (JD)

Military service
- Allegiance: United States
- Branch/service: United States Marine Corps
- Rank: Sergeant
- Unit: 3rd Battalion, 8th Marines
- Battles/wars: Gulf War

Chris Taliaferro (born December 9, 1965) is an American politician serving as a member of the Chicago City Council representing the 29th ward since 2015. The ward includes the Austin, Montclare and Galewood areas.

== Aldermanic career ==
Taliaferro was elected alderman in 2015, unseating incumbent Deborah L. Graham. He was reelected in 2019.

He is a member of the following committees; Human Relations, Committees, Rules and Ethics, License and Consumer Protection, Pedestrian and Traffic Safety, Public Safety and Transportation and Public Way. He is a member of the Chicago City Council's Progressive Reform Caucus, its Veterans Caucus and its Black Caucus.

In the runoff of the 2019 Chicago mayoral election, Taliaferro endorsed Toni Preckwinkle. Taliaferro was considered a City Council ally of Mayor Lori Lightfoot during her time as mayor.

In June 2022, Taliaferro lost a primary election for a Cook County judgeship.

== See also ==
- List of Chicago alderpersons since 1923
