= Milly Santiago =

American politician

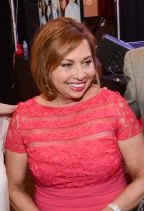

Member of the Chicago City Council from the 31st ward
- In office May 18, 2015 – May 20, 2019
- Preceded by: Ray Suarez
- Succeeded by: Felix Cardona, Jr.

Personal details
- Born: Milagros Santiago Vega Baja, Puerto Rico
- Party: Democratic Party
- Education: Northeastern Illinois University {B.A.J.M.C.)
- Website: www.millysantiago.com

Military service
- Allegiance: United States of America
- Branch/service: United States Army Reserve

Milagros "Milly" Santiago is an American politician who served as alderman of the 31st ward of Chicago, Illinois from 2015 to 2019. She is a member of the Democratic Party.

== Early life and education ==
Milly Santiago was born in Vega Baja, Puerto Rico and moved to Chicago in 1976. She soon joined the United States Army Reserve and attended Northeastern Illinois University, earning a Bachelor of Arts in Journalism and Mass Communication in 1986. Santiago then worked as a television journalist for Telemundo in Chicago and later as a news anchor for Univision, also in Chicago. Santiago left Univision and worked as 26th ward alderman Billy Ocasio's chief of staff in 1993. After returning to work for Telemundo as a reporter, she later worked as a communications specialist and manager for the State of Illinois starting in 2008.

== Political career ==
Milly Santiago was elected the alderman of the 31st ward on April 7, 2015. She received 51% of the vote, defeating incumbent alderman Ray Suarez. Santiago was supported by Congressman Luis Gutierrez and Cook County Commissioner Jesús "Chuy" García.

Santiago lost reelection as alderman in 2019.

== Controversy ==
Milly Santiago inserted herself in the middle of a controversy involving the 2016 World Series featuring the Chicago Cubs vs the Cleveland Indians. The Cubs franchise offered Chicago aldermen the option of purchasing tickets at face value. However, the Board of Ethics determine this to be a gift over $50 due to the secondary market markup on the tickets. Santiago and some of her peers believed that they should be exempt from this because they are too poor to purchase tickets on the secondary market. As an alderman, Santiago makes roughly $116,000 a year. Santiago is quoted as saying "First of all, those tickets were not front-row tickets. They were all the way in the upper-deck. If I went like this, I would almost touch the ceiling. That’s how bad those tickets were," Santiago said, lifting her arm over her head. Ald. Milly Santiago (31st) said she is "a poor alderman" who can't afford to pay thousands of dollars for Cubs tickets purchased on the secondary market according to the Chicago Sun-Times.

== See also ==
- Chicago aldermanic elections, 2015
- Chicago City Council
