= Carrie Austin =

American politician

Member of the Chicago City Council from the 34th ward
- In office August 5, 1994 – March 1, 2023
- Preceded by: Lemuel Austin
- Succeeded by: Bill Conway

Personal details
- Born: May 15, 1949 (age 75)
- Political party: Democratic
- Spouse: Lemuel Austin (Deceased)
- Children: 7

Carrie Austin is a former alderman on the Chicago City Council who represented the 34th ward on Chicago's far south side from 1994 to 2023. The predominantly African-American ward includes portions of Morgan Park, Roseland, Washington Heights and West Pullman.

== Chicago City Council ==
Austin was appointed by Richard M. Daley to the seat of her late husband Lemuel Austin. She officially took office on July 13, 1994. She has been reelected in 1995, 1999, 2003, 2007, 2011, 2015, and 2019.

As a member of the Chicago City Council, she serves on six committees: Budget and Government operations; Energy, Environmental Protection and Public Utilities; Finance; Health; Housing and Real Estate; and Zoning.

Austin served as a delegate to the 2012 Democratic National Convention.

Austin was an ally of mayors Richard M. Daley and Rahm Emanuel.

In 2016, Austin was a presidential elector from Illinois.

In the runoff of the 2019 Chicago mayoral election, Austin endorsed Lori Lightfoot.

On May 17, 2019, Austin publicly admitted that she had hired family members as interns on her committee payroll, refusing to apologize for it. The same day, mayor-elect Lightfoot announced that she would be naming Pat Dowell to supplant Austin as the City Council's budget chairman. Austin publicly took offense to this move by Lightfoot.

On July 1, 2021, Austin was indicted for allegedly taking bribes from a private development firm.

Austin previously served as the Democratic Committeewoman for the 34th ward. In late 2019, she withdrew from the race to remain the ward's committeewoman.

Austin's tenure on the Chicago City Council ended when she resigned from office effective March 1, 2023.
