= Jason Ervin =

American politician

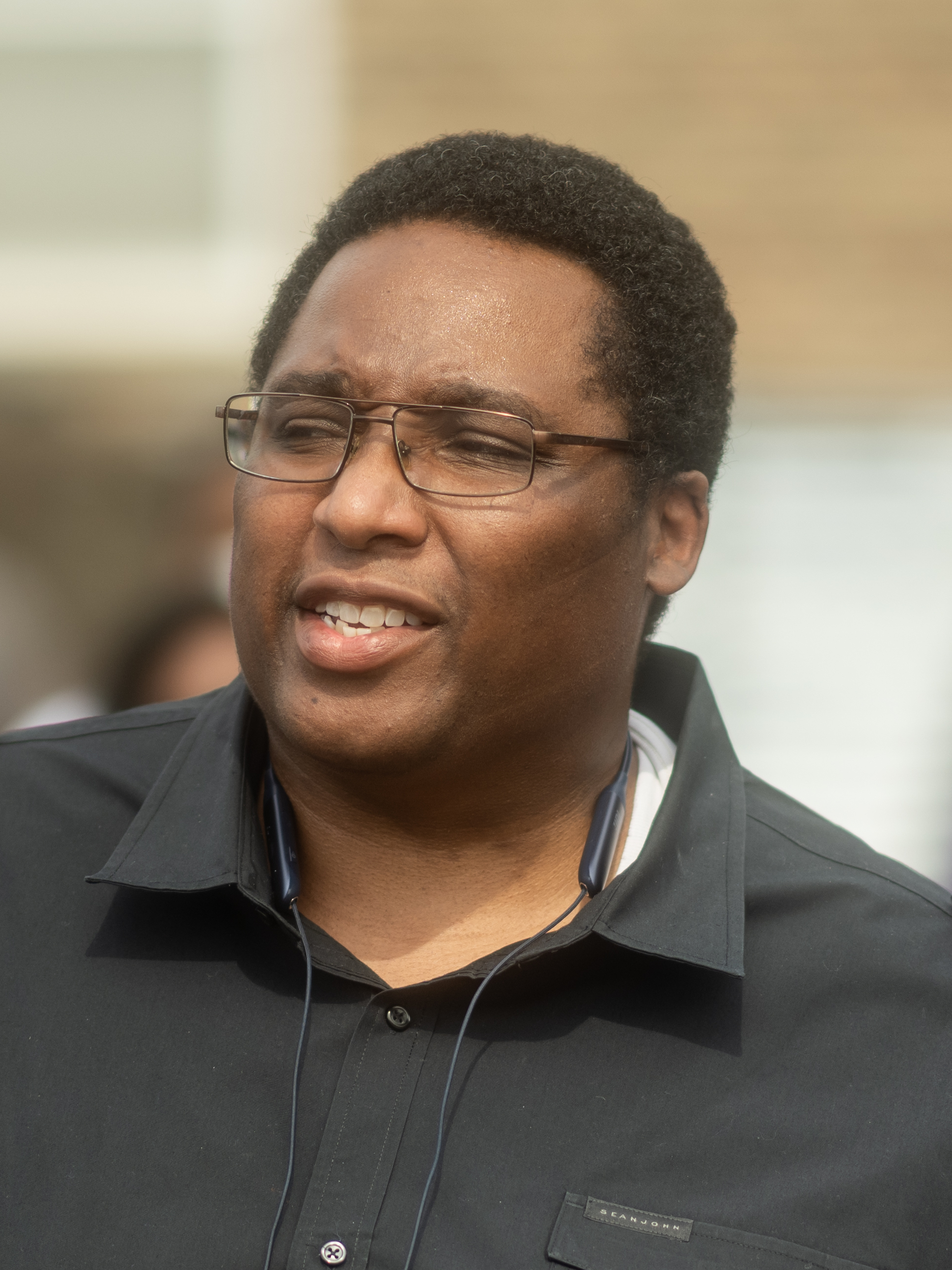

Member of the Chicago City Council from the 28th ward
- Incumbent
- Assumed office January 13, 2011
- Preceded by: Ed Smith

Personal details
- Born: May 7, 1974 (age 52) Chicago, Illinois, U.S.
- Party: Democratic
- Spouse: Melissa Conyears
- Education: Southern Illinois University, Carbondale (BA); Governors State University (MPA)

Jason C. Ervin (born May 7, 1974) is an American politician who serves on the Chicago City Council. He became the alderman for Chicago's 28th ward, located on the west side of Chicago, in 2011.

== Education and early career ==
Ervin has a Bachelor of Arts from Southern Illinois University at Carbondale and a Master of Public Administration from Governors State University. Prior to his appointment to the Chicago City Council, he was the village manager of Maywood, Illinois. He also is a Certified Public Accountant (CPA) and graduate of Morgan Park Academy.

== Aldermanic career ==
In 2010, Ervin was appointed by mayor Richard M. Daley to replace the retiring Ed Smith as 28th Ward alderman. Ervin was reelected in 2011, 2015, 2019, and 2023.

He is the Chair of the Committee on The Budget and Government Operations. He also serves on the following committees; Aviation, Committees & Rules, Contract Oversight & Equity, Finance, Pedestrian & Traffic Safety, and Transportation.

In the runoff of the 2019 Chicago mayoral election, Ervin endorsed Toni Preckwinkle over Lori Lightfoot, who was elected. Early in Lightfoot's mayoralty Ervin came into conflict with her, but ultimately became one of her strongest City Council allies, and endorsed her for her unsuccessful bid for re-election in the 2023 Chicago mayoral election.

== See also ==
- List of Chicago alderpersons since 1923
