= Natashia Holmes =

American politician (born 1975)

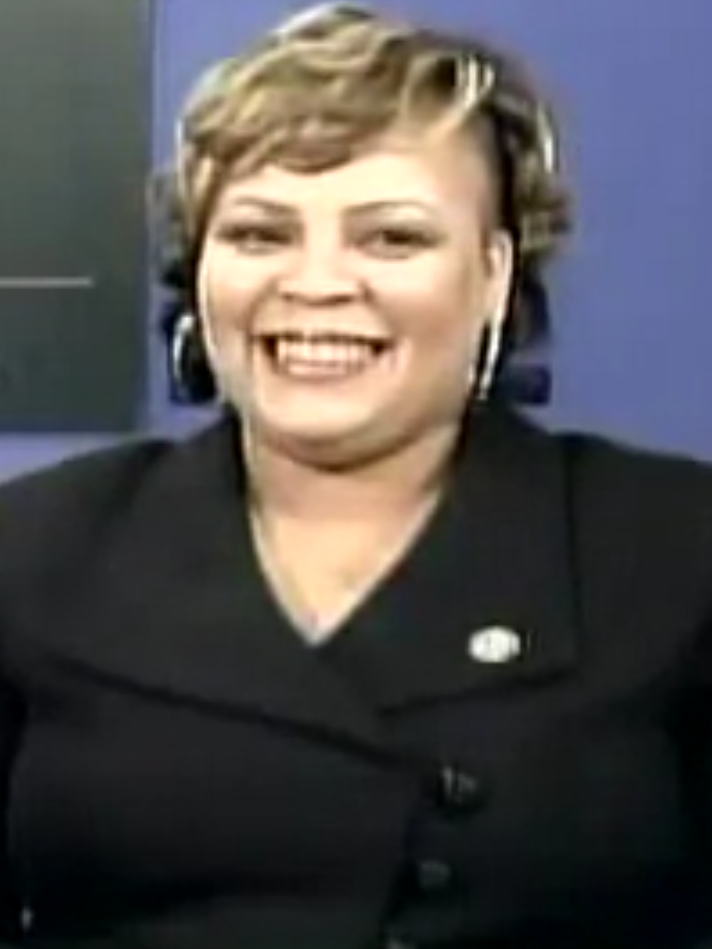

City of Chicago Alderman from the 7th ward
- In office February 13, 2013 – May 18, 2015
- Preceded by: Sandi Jackson
- Succeeded by: Gregory Mitchell

Personal details
- Born: Natashia Lynnette Holmes; April 25, 1975 (age 51) Melbourne, Florida, U.S.
- Education: Alabama State University, Auburn University, Chicago-Kent College of Law

Natashia L. Holmes (born April 25, 1975) is an American politician who served as the alderman of the 7th ward of the City of Chicago. Holmes was appointed by the Chicago City Council and Mayor Rahm Emanuel, replacing Sandi Jackson, who resigned in January 2013 due to personal and legal problems. Holmes was sworn in on February 13, 2013.

== Education and career ==
Holmes earned a bachelor's degree from Alabama State University's College of Education in 1997, a Masters in Community Planning from Auburn University's College of Architecture, Design and Construction in 2000, and a Juris Doctor degree and certificate in Environmental and Energy Law from Chicago-Kent College of Law in 2011. An urban planner, she has worked as a Transportation Planning Liaison for the DuPage Mayors and Managers Conference, and held positions with the Illinois Department of Transportation's Division of Public and Intermodal Transportation. Prior to her appointment as alderman, she was a project manager for Metro Strategies, a Glen Ellyn, Illinois-based planning, policy and public affairs consulting firm. She also serves on the external advisory board for the Institute for Environmental Science and Policy at the University of Illinois at Chicago, and was a community representative to the local school council of the Adam Clayton Powell Paideia Community Academy in the city's South Shore neighborhood.
