= Gregory Mitchell =

American politician

Greg Mitchell

Member of the Chicago City Council from the 7th ward
- Incumbent
- Assumed office May 18, 2015
- Preceded by: Natashia Holmes

Personal details
- Born: April 22, 1969 (age 57)
- Party: Democratic
- Education: Grambling State University (BS)

Gregory I. Mitchell (born April 22, 1969) is an American politician and the current alderman of Chicago's 7th ward. He took office in 2015 with 57% of the vote. He has a degree from Grambling State University.

== Aldermanic career ==
Mitchell was first elected alderman in 2015, unseating incumbent Natashia Holmes. He was subsequently reelected in 2019 and 2023.

In the runoff of the 2019 Chicago mayoral election, Mitchell endorsed Toni Preckwinkle.

== Allegations of violence ==
In February 2024, Christopher Amatore (one of Mitchell's constituents) claimed that during a meeting with Mitchell, the Alderman screamed at Amatore, threatened his life, his Chicago Housing Authority contract, and "screamed at the top of his lungs. [He said], `You better watch your f----ing ass walking around my ward because you are no longer safe'".

Later that same month, Mitchell reportedly got into a physical altercation with another Alderman, Desmon Yancy. After a special session meeting at City Hall, "Yancy claims, Mitchell suddenly “got aggressive. Said the phrase, ‘Do you want to do something?’ And then grabbed me around my head and shoulders and it felt like an attempt to wrestle me to the ground". According to police reports, Yancy originally considered pursuing charges, but ultimately decided not to. Mitchell denies these claims.

== See also ==
- List of Chicago alderpersons since 1923
