= Raymond Lopez =

American politician (born 1978)

Ray Lopez
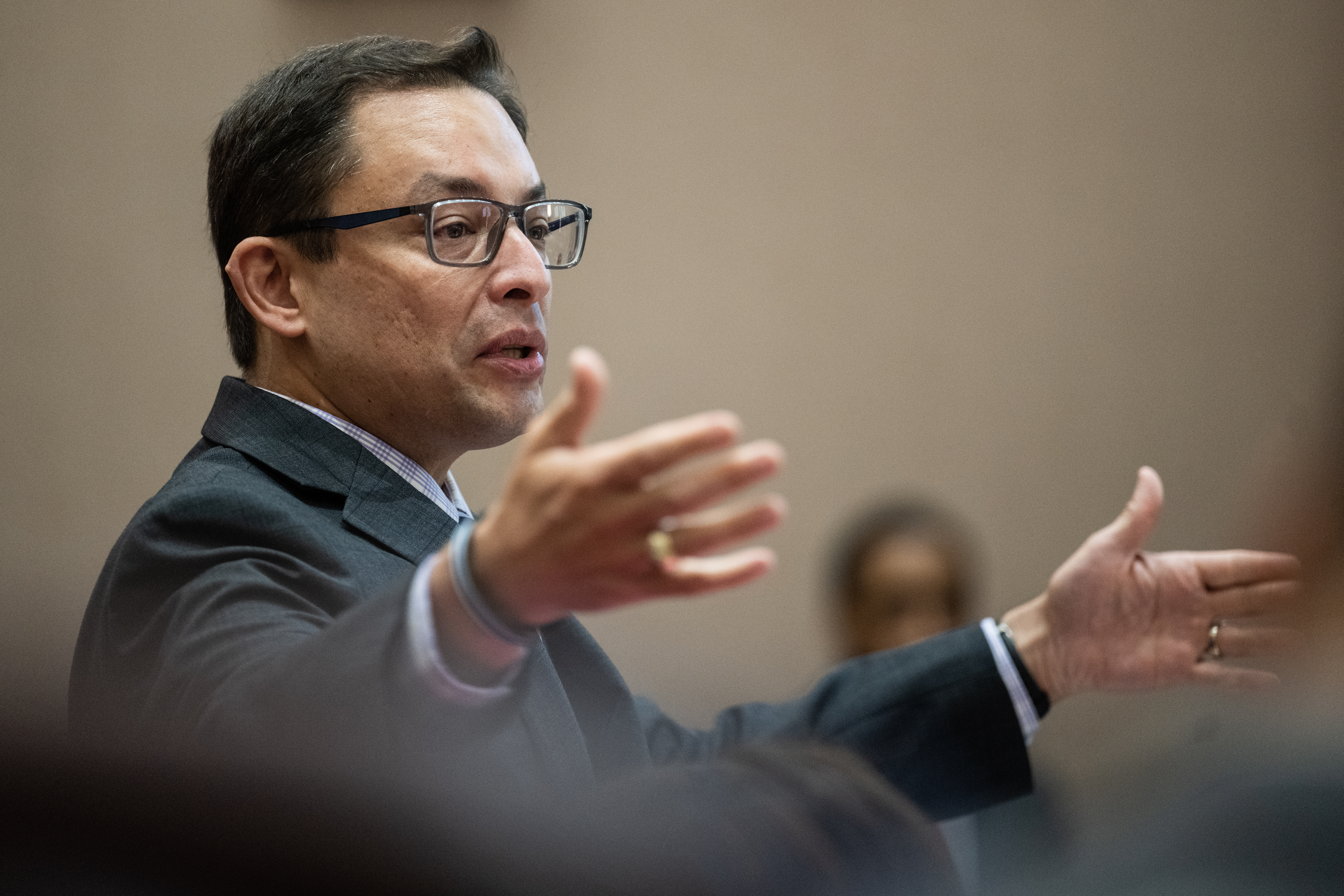
- Lopez speaking to City Council in 2023

Member of the Chicago City Council from the 15th ward
- Incumbent
- Assumed office May 18, 2015
- Preceded by: Toni Foulkes (Redistricted)

Personal details
- Born: Raymond Anthony Lopez; May 26, 1978 (age 48) Chicago, Illinois, U.S.
- Party: Democratic
- Spouse: Hugo Lopez
- Education: University of Illinois, Chicago
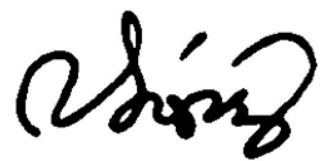
- Signature

Raymond Anthony Lopez (born May 26, 1978) is an American politician who is currently a member of the Chicago City Council serving as alderman of the 15th Ward in Chicago, Illinois.

A member of the Democratic Party, Lopez was first elected as Democratic Committeeman of the 15th Ward in 2012, becoming the first openly gay Mexican-American to be elected in Illinois. On April 7, 2015, Lopez was elected alderman of the 15th Ward. The 15th ward includes the West Englewood, Brighton Park, Back of the Yards, Chicago Lawn, Canaryville, and Gage Park neighborhoods.

== Early life and education ==
Born in Chicago, Lopez is a graduate of St. Laurence Catholic High School. Lopez was first introduced to politics at the age of 18 when he became a precinct captain under the Dan Lipinski organization of the 23rd Ward on the Southwest Side of Chicago. He studied at the University of Illinois at Chicago.

Prior to his political career, Lopez worked as a skycap for Southwest Airlines at Midway International Airport. He was a skycap for 12 years.

== Career ==
In 2011, Lopez ran unsuccessfully for alderman of the 15th Ward, forcing the incumbent into a run-off election.

In 2012, after the incumbent Democratic Committeeman withdrew from the race, Lopez ran unopposed. In 2012, as a result of redistricting following the 2010 United States census, the demographics of the 15th Ward changed. Previously, the 15th Ward only included the neighborhoods of Chicago Lawn/Marquette Manor and West Englewood. The new 15th Ward (c. 2012) now includes significant portions of Brighton Park, Back of the Yards, Gage Park, and New City, with West Englewood still remaining.

=== Chicago City Council ===
In 2015, Lopez again ran to represent the newly redrawn 15th Ward on the Chicago City Council. In a primary field of seven candidates, Lopez narrowly missed winning outright by 127 votes. In the April 7, 2015 run-off election, Lopez successfully obtained 58% of the total vote. On May 18, 2015, Lopez was sworn in along with the mayor, city treasurer, city clerk, and 49 other alderman at the Chicago Theatre.

In the first round of the 2019 Chicago mayoral election, Lopez endorsed Gery Chico for mayor.

Lopez is considered a potential candidate to run for Chicago Mayor in February 2027.

=== 2023 Chicago mayoral election ===
On April 6, 2022, Lopez announced his intention to run in the 2023 Chicago mayoral election. No incumbent Chicago City Council member had been elected mayor since the 19th century, although two had been appointed to the office to fill vacancies.

On November 21, 2022, after fundraising and collecting petition signatures to run for mayor, Lopez instead dropped out of the race and filed to run for re-election to city council.

=== Criticism of Lori Lightfoot ===
Lopez emerged as a top critic of Mayor Lori Lightfoot in the City Council. On May 31, 2020, during a conference call with all 50 Chicago aldermen regarding protests in response to the police murder of George Floyd, Lopez got into a heated argument with Lightfoot over her supposed insufficient response to looters, culminating with the two swearing at one another.

=== 2024 congressional election ===
On October 3, 2023, Lopez announced he would run against incumbent Chuy García in the Democratic primary for Illinois's 4th congressional district. On March 19, 2024, García defeated Lopez by about 69% to 31%.

== Political positions ==
In January 2024, Lopez voted against the City Council resolution for a ceasefire in Gaza. "We can discuss the cease-fire as soon as all the hostages and bodily remains are returned unconditionally," he told the Chicago Sun-Times.

Regarding immigration, Lopez supports legalization of dreamers, although he says he would have supported the stalled senate immigration package from February 2024, which did not include protections for dreamers. According to his campaign website for the 2024 congressional race, he supports immigration reform that includes pathways to citizenship for undocumented immigrants, securing the borders to reduce the influx of additional undocumented immigrants, and creating "carve-outs" in Chicago's Sanctuary city policy so that certain individuals (those who "have committed sex crimes against minors, engaged in prostitution, have identified as members of a gang, or have been arrested for a violent crime") could be turned over to USCIS.

== Personal life ==
Lopez is openly gay. He refers to his dogs as his "children". He is married to Hugo Lopez.

== See also ==
- List of Chicago alderpersons since 1923
