= Deborah L. Graham =

American politician (born 1966)

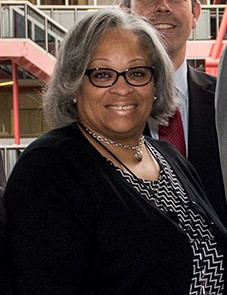

Member of the Chicago City Council from the 29th ward
- In office 2010–2015
- Preceded by: Isaac Carothers
- Succeeded by: Chris Taliaferro

Member of the Illinois House of Representatives from the 78th district
- In office 2002–2010
- Preceded by: Bob Biggins (district renumbered)
- Succeeded by: Camille Lilly

Personal details
- Born: May 2, 1966 (age 60) Chicago, Illinois, U.S.
- Party: Democratic
- Education: Robert Morris University

Deborah L. Graham (born May 2, 1966) is a former member of the Chicago City Council and Illinois House of Representatives. From March 2010 until February 24, 2015, she has represented the 29th Ward on Chicago's West Side. She was appointed by Mayor Richard M. Daley. Prior to her service as a city councilwoman, Graham was a Democratic member of the Illinois House of Representatives, representing the 78th District from 1995 until 2010. She was the secretary for the Illinois Legislative Black Caucus.

== City council committee appointments ==
She was appointed to serve on the Committee of the Whole; Housing & Urban Development; Appropriations-General Service (Vice-Chairperson); Appropriations-Human Services; Labor; Transportation & Motor Vehicles; and the Licenses and Registration, Subcommittee (Sub-Co-Chairperson).
