= Toni Foulkes =

American politician

Member of the Chicago City Council from the 16th ward
- In office May 18, 2015 – May 20, 2019
- Preceded by: JoAnn Thompson
- Succeeded by: Stephanie Coleman

Member of the Chicago City Council from the 15th ward
- In office May 21, 2007 – May 18, 2015
- Preceded by: Theodore Thomas
- Succeeded by: Raymond Lopez

Toni Foulkes is the former alderman of Chicago's 16th ward, and was formerly the alderman for the 15th ward. She is African American.

== Aldermanic career ==
In 2007, Foulkes was elected Chicago alderman for the 15th Ward, winning an open-race to succeed outgoing alderman Theodore Thomas. She was reelected in 2011.

She was redistricted to the 16th Ward, where she won election in 2015. The race saw her running against incumbent 16th Ward alderman JoAnn Thompson, in addition to several other contenders. However, Thompson died two weeks before the initial round of voting in the election. Ultimately, the election saw her win a runoff election against Stephanie Coleman.

In 2019, Foulkes was unseated by Stephanie Coleman, who she had narrowly defeated in the previous election.

In 2014, she supported a bill to require employers to provide paid sick leave for all Chicago workers.
