= Pat Dowell =

American politician (born 1957)

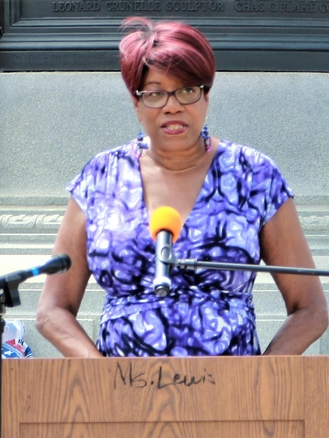
- Dowell in 2019

Member of the Chicago City Council from the 3rd ward
- Incumbent
- Assumed office May 21, 2007
- Preceded by: Dorothy Tillman

Personal details
- Born: May 13, 1957 (age 69)
- Party: Democratic
- Education: University of Rochester (BA); University of Chicago (MA)
- Website: Official website

Pat Dowell is a member of the Chicago City Council representing the City of Chicago's 3rd ward in Cook County, Illinois. Dowell was elected in April 2007 in a runoff election against incumbent Dorothy Tillman. Dowell had lost to Tillman in 2003. Dowell is a member of the City Council's Housing and Real Estate, Transportation and the Public Way, Landmarks, Rules and Health committees.

== Early life and education ==
Dowell has a B.A. degree in developmental psychology from the University of Rochester and a master's degree in social service administration from the University of Chicago.

== Aldermanic career ==
Dowell was elected alderman for the 3rd ward in 2007, unseating incumbent Dorothy Tillman. She has subsequently been reelected in 2011, 2015, and 2019.

Bronzeville is located in Chicago's 3rd ward, currently represented by Alderman Pat Dowell.

Dowell introduced the amendment to the Vacant Property Ordinance that was passed by the Chicago City Council on July 28, 2011, holding banks responsible for maintaining foreclosed properties in neighborhoods across Chicago. Dowell commented on the issue, saying: "The foreclosure process sometimes takes a year or 18 months, two years for them to actually foreclose on the property and sometimes certain banks let those properties sit vacant....They can become haven for gang bangers and drug dealers; there is also the potential for fire hazards.....When vacant buildings are left to deteriorate, local property values tumble and criminality gains an entry into the neighborhood.....The landmark piece of legislation passed today will hold banks responsible for the upkeep of vacant properties, keeping them secure and keeping neighborhoods intact." Dowell also stated that: "This legislation goes a long way to keep our neighborhoods vibrant and soften the negative impact the housing foreclosure process has had on the city."

Dowell was the recipient of the Independent Voters of Illinois' Best Aldermanic Voting Record for 2010, presented by the Independent Voters of Illinois-Independent Precinct Organization (IVI-IPO), a not-for-profit, multi-partisan, independent political organization that has been in existence since 1944 dedicated to good government activism. Dowell along with Alderman Bob Fioretti (2nd) and Alderman Joe Moore (49th), was given IVI-IPO's Best Aldermanic Voting Award. Upon receiving the award Dowell stated: "I am thankful for the IVI-IPO recognition of my work in the City Council and my commitment to good government and participatory democracy. These are values I hold most dear and I'm proud to be associated with an organization like IVO-IPO that has been fighting the fight for social justice for over 60 years."

In 2018, J. B. Pritzker appointed Dowell a member of the gubernatorial transition's Job Creation and Economic Opportunity Committee.

In the runoff of the 2019 Chicago mayoral election, Dowell endorsed Toni Preckwinkle.

On May 17, three days prior to her inauguration, Lori Lightfoot announced that she would be naming Dowell to be the City Council's budget chairman. Dowell has generally aligned with Lightfoot's preferences in votes on the City Council, and has supported each of Lightfoot's budgets. However, she has dissented from the mayor on occasion, such as by casting the only vote on the City Council against the creation of a tax increment financing district to fund an extension of the CTA Red Line to 130th Street. She also, alongside other alderman from downtown wards, criticized Lightfoot's decision to permit the NASCAR Chicago Street Race to be held in the downtown. Despite being a regular ally of Lightfoot on the City Council, Dowell endorsed Brandon Johnson against Lightfoot in the 2023 Chicago mayoral election.

Under Mayor Brandon Johnson, Dowell became the first woman to chair the City Council's Committee on Finance.

In September 2024, Dowell signed an open letter opposing Mayor Johnson's efforts to oust Public Schools CEO Pedro Martinez and calling for Martinez to be retained as schools CEO.

== Campaigns for other offices ==
In April 2021, Dowell announced that she will be a candidate in the 2022 election for Illinois secretary of state. In January 2022, after U.S. Representative Bobby Rush announced his retirement, Dowell withdrew from the secretary of state race and announced that she would instead run in the primary to succeed Rush as representative for Illinois' 1st congressional district. She placed second in the Democratic primary election.

== See also ==
- List of Chicago alderpersons since 1923
