= Emma Mitts =

American politician

- Mitts in June 2020

Member of the Chicago City Council from the 37th ward
- Incumbent
- Assumed office January 7, 2000
- Preceded by: Percy Giles

Personal details
- Born: June 12, 1955 (age 71) Elaine, Arkansas, U.S.
- Party: Democratic
- Education: Phillips Community College; University of Arkansas, Fayetteville; Triton College

Emma Mitts (born June 12, 1955) is alderman of the 37th ward on Chicago's West Side. The predominantly African-American ward includes portions of Austin, West Garfield Park and West Humboldt Park. She has represented the ward since 2000.

== Early life ==
Mitts was born June 12, 1955, in Elaine, Arkansas.

She eventually became a coordinator of special projects for the Chicago Department of Streets and Sanitation

== Chicago City Council ==
Mitts was appointed by Richard M. Daley to the Chicago City Council in January 2000 to replace Percy Giles who had been indicted along with other city officials in Operation Silver Shovel. She has been reelected in 2003, 2007, 2011, 2015, and 2019. In 2006, her ward received the first Wal-Mart in Chicago. She was an opponent of the 2006 Chicago Big Box Ordinance.

In the runoff of the 2019 Chicago mayoral election, Mitts endorsed Lori Lightfoot. After the death of Karen Yarbrough, Mitts was appointed state central committeewoman from Illinois's 7th congressional district.

== See also ==
- List of Chicago alderpersons since 1923
