= Jennie Byrd Bryan Payne =

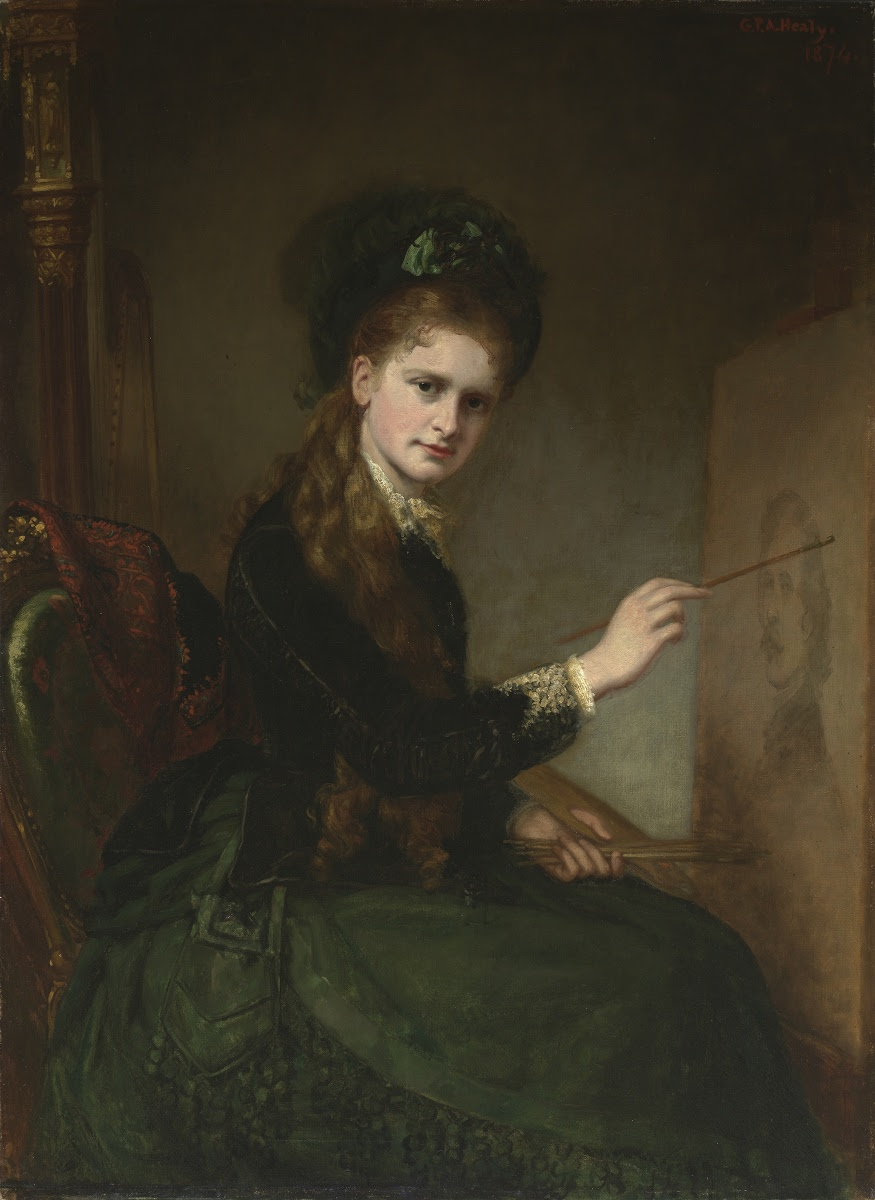
- 1874 portrait by George Peter Alexander Healy (which depicts her as painting a portrait of Healey)
- Born: Jennie Byrd Bryan; 1857; Elmhurst, Illinois
- Died: August 1, 1919 (age 61 or 60); Elmhurst, Illinois
- Resting place: Oak Hill Cemetery, Washington, D.C.
- Spouse: John Barton Payne (m. 1913)
- Father: Thomas Barbour Bryan
- Relatives: Charles Page Bryan (brother); Daniel Bryan (grandfather); James Barbour (great-uncle); Philip P. Barbour (great-uncle); Thomas Barbour (great-grandfather); Bryan Lathrop (cousin); Barbour Lathrop (cousin); Florence Lathrop Field Page (cousin)

Jennie Byrd Bryan Payne (1857–August 1, 1919) was an American philanthropist, artist and society figure. She was a member of the Barbour family.

Soon after her death, the founding gift for what became the Virginia Museum of Fine Arts was made by her husband John Barton Payne in memory of her and her mother-in-law.

== Biography ==
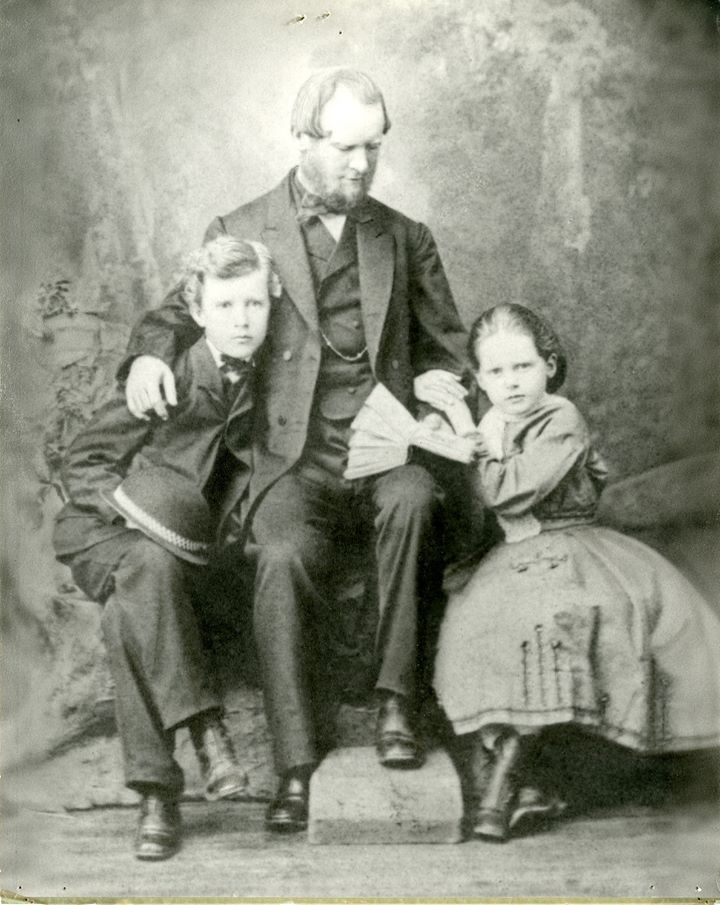
Childhood photograph with her father and brother Charles, circa 1865

Born Jennie Byrd Bryan in 1857 in Elmhurst, Illinois (at the time known as "Cottage Hill"), she was the daughter of Thomas Barbour Bryan and the elder Jennie Byrd Bryan. She was a member of the esteemed Barbour family through her paternal grandmother.

She was a student of artist George Peter Alexander Healy, who, for six years, lived in a cottage adjacent to her family's Eagle Nest estate in Cottage Hill (Elmhurst).

As an adult, residing in Washington, D.C., she was prominent in the city's society, and was a notable philanthropist. Bryan continued to be an artist, establishing renown. She had portraits displayed in collections across the country.

She joined her older brother Charles Page Bryan, a diplomat, on many of his assignments abroad. For several years, she acted as a hostess at the United States Embassy to Japan while her brother served as United States ambassador to Japan.

In 1913, she married John Barton Payne, taking his surname. The Paynes never had any children.

Payne died on August 1, 1919, at her summer house in Elmhurst. She had been sick or two weeks before her death. She was buried at Oak Hill Cemetery in Washington, D.C.

After her father's death, many of the paintings from his large collection of George Peter Alexander Healy's works had been inherited by her. In 1920, her widowed husband gave a collection of forty masterpieces to the State of Virginia, a gift valued at time at over $1 million. In this gift were several of the paintings by Healy. This gift, which was given by her widowed husband alongside a financial gift of $100,000 for a museum to house the art, came with a stipulation that the state must match his financial gift to fund the construction of a museum. This was eventually done in 1932, and construction began on the Virginia Museum of Fine Arts. The gift had been made in memory of both Jennie Byrd Bryan Payne and her mother-in-law, Elizabeth Barton Payne.
