= Henry Field (1841–1890) =

American businessman and philanthropist (1841–1890)

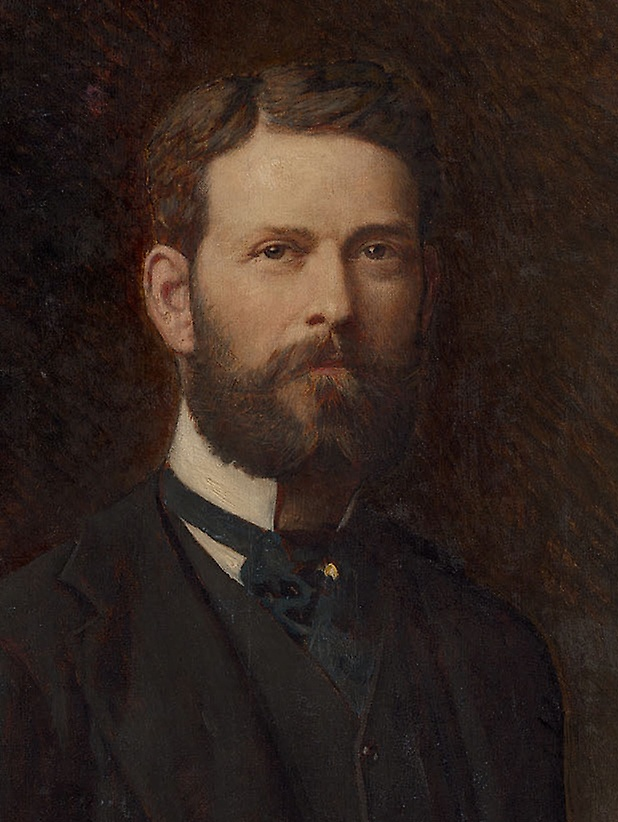
- Portrait of Henry Field by Léon Joseph Florentin Bonnat
- Born: 1841; Conway, Massachusetts
- Died: December 22, 1890 (aged 49); Chicago, Illinois
- Resting place: Graceland Cemetery
- Spouse: Florence Lathrop (m. 1878)
- Relatives: Marshall Field (brother); Ethel Beatty (niece); Bryan Lathrop (brother-in-law); Barbour Lathrop (brother-in-law)

Henry Field (1841 – December 22, 1890) was an American businessman and philanthropist. A millionaire, Field was involved in the business ventures of his brother Marshall Field, and many other commercial ventures.

Through his marriage to Florence Lathrop in 1878, Field became a member of the prestigious Barbour family.

== Early life ==
Field was born in Conway, Massachusetts in 1841.

== Adult life ==
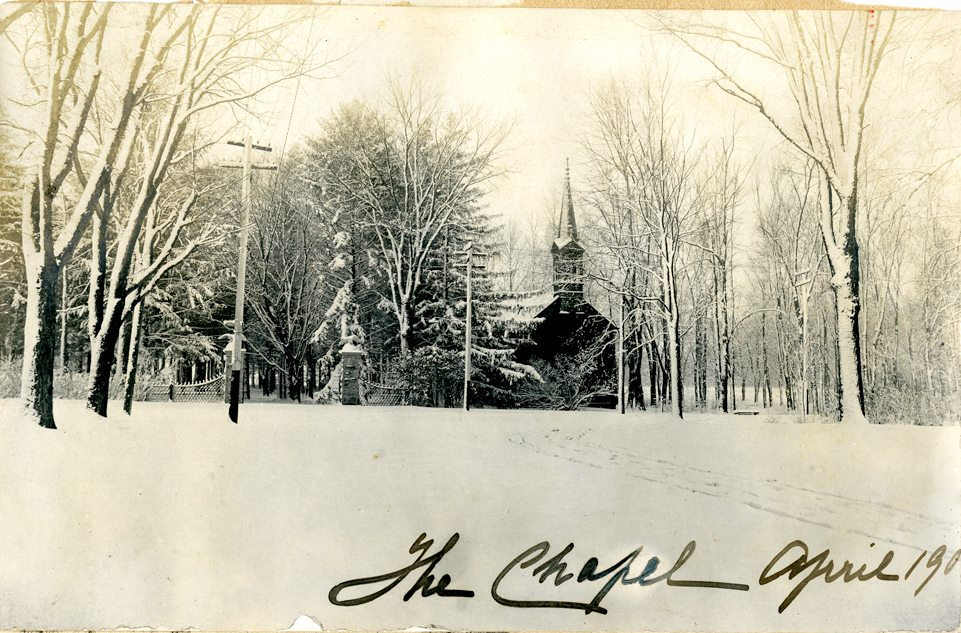
Field's wedding took place at Byrd's Nest Chapel, photographed here in 1900.

In 1861, Field moved to Chicago, Illinois. Field quickly received employment at Cooley, Farwell & Co, where his brother Marshall also worked.

When Field, Leiter & Company, the business of his elder brother Marshall, was established in 1869, Field became a member of the firm. Field would become a millionaire, serving as a junior partner of the company.

On October 29, 1879, at the age of 38, Field wed the 21-year-old Florence Lathrop at the Byrd's Nest Chapel, in Elmhurst, Illinois. Florence, a daughter of Jedediah Hyde Lathrop, was a member of the prestigious Barbour family.

After their wedding, Field and his new wife lived abroad in Paris for two years, with Field working as a foreign buyer in Europe for Field, Leiter & Company, which would soon be renamed Marshall Field & Company.

Upon returning to the United States, the Fields resided in Chicago. In March 1882, Florence gave birth to their first child, a daughter who she named after her dead sister Minna (who would later take the name Minna Field Page). In December 1883 Florence gave birth to their second daughter, who they named Florence (who would ultimately marry and become Florence Field Lindsay). In 1888, she gave birth to a third daughter, who they named Gladys. Glayds would die eight months after birth.

When they returned to the United States in 1882, Field took a year's leave from Marshall Field & Company, returning only briefly before retiring from business in 1883, partially due to his failing health. He would take a European trip after retiring, and return from it in improved health. Field would return briefly to his brother's company again from 1885 until 1889, before again retiring. In the years after retiring from his brother's company, Field traveled extensively abroad.

Field was involved in other business ventures in addition to working at his brother's company. Field served as vice-president and plurality stockholder of the Commercial National Bank. He would hold the position of vice-president at the time of his death. Field had extensive financial interests in Chicago business ventures. At one point, he was one of the greatest stock holders in the West Division Street railway company. which was a cable car company.

Field was a member of a number of Chicago's leading clubs.

Field was also a noted philanthropist. In 1883 and 1884, he served as director of the Chicago Relief and Aid Society. In 1884, he was also a member of the organization's executive committee. He would later serve as its treasurer, holding this position at the time of his death. In 1884, Field served as president of the Home for the Friendless.

Field served as the director of the Inter-State Industrial Exposition hosted by Chicago in 1886.

Field was an art patron. He was said to have privately amassed one of the finest art collections in the city of Chicago. He served as a trustee of the Art Institute of Chicago. Field was also a member of the art committee of the Inter-State Industrial Exposition, in addition to being the exposition's director. In 1885, Field served as the director of Chicago's inaugural opera festival.

== Death ==
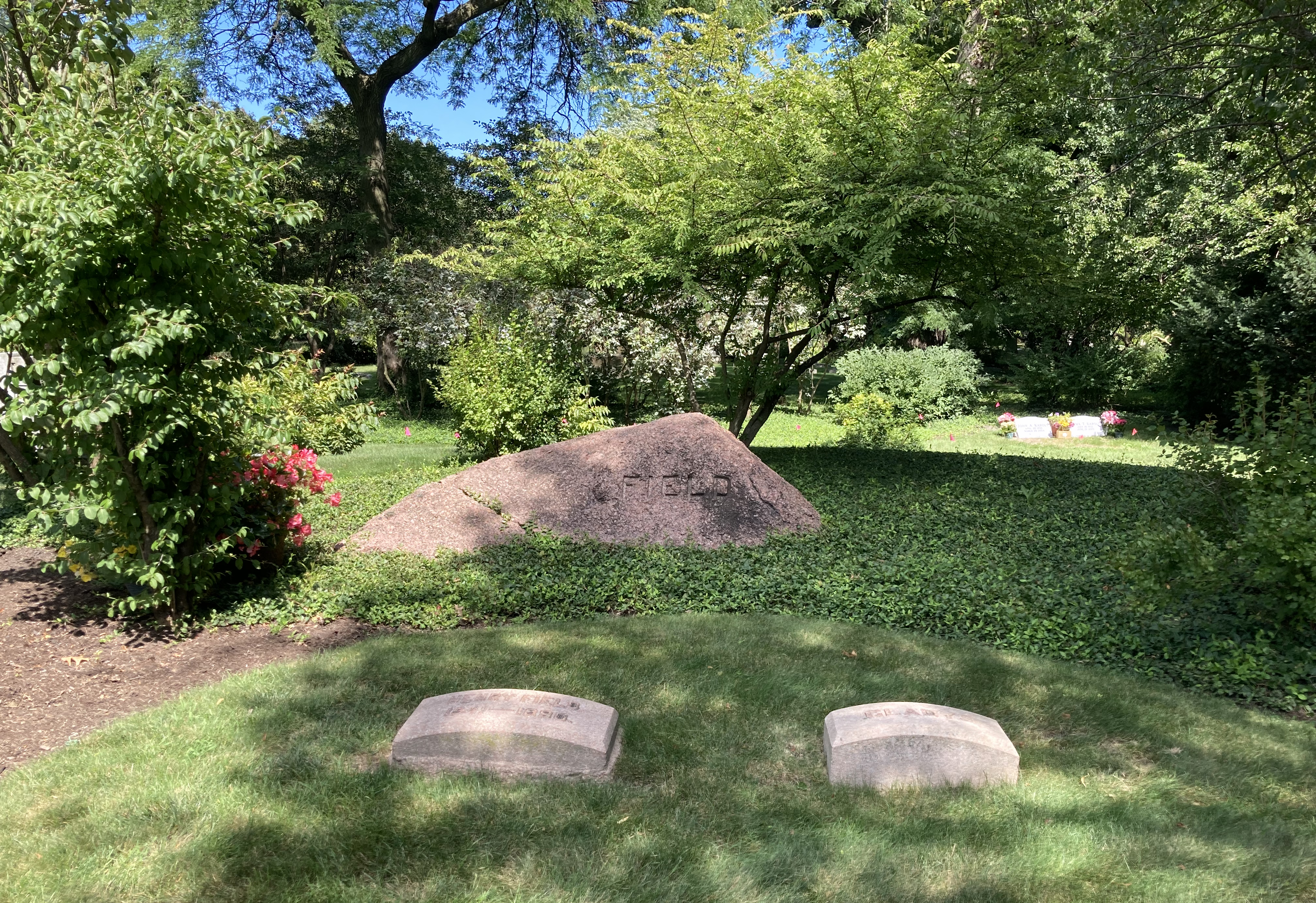
Field's grave at Graceland Cemetery

On December 22, 1890, three days before Christmas, Field unexpectedly died after a brief sickness. He was 49 years old. While he had been sick for roughly a week, his illness did not appear to be serious until three days before his death. He was buried at Graceland Cemetery, a cemetery his wife's uncle Thomas Barbour Bryan had founded, and which her brother Bryan Lathrop then served as the president of.

== Legacy ==
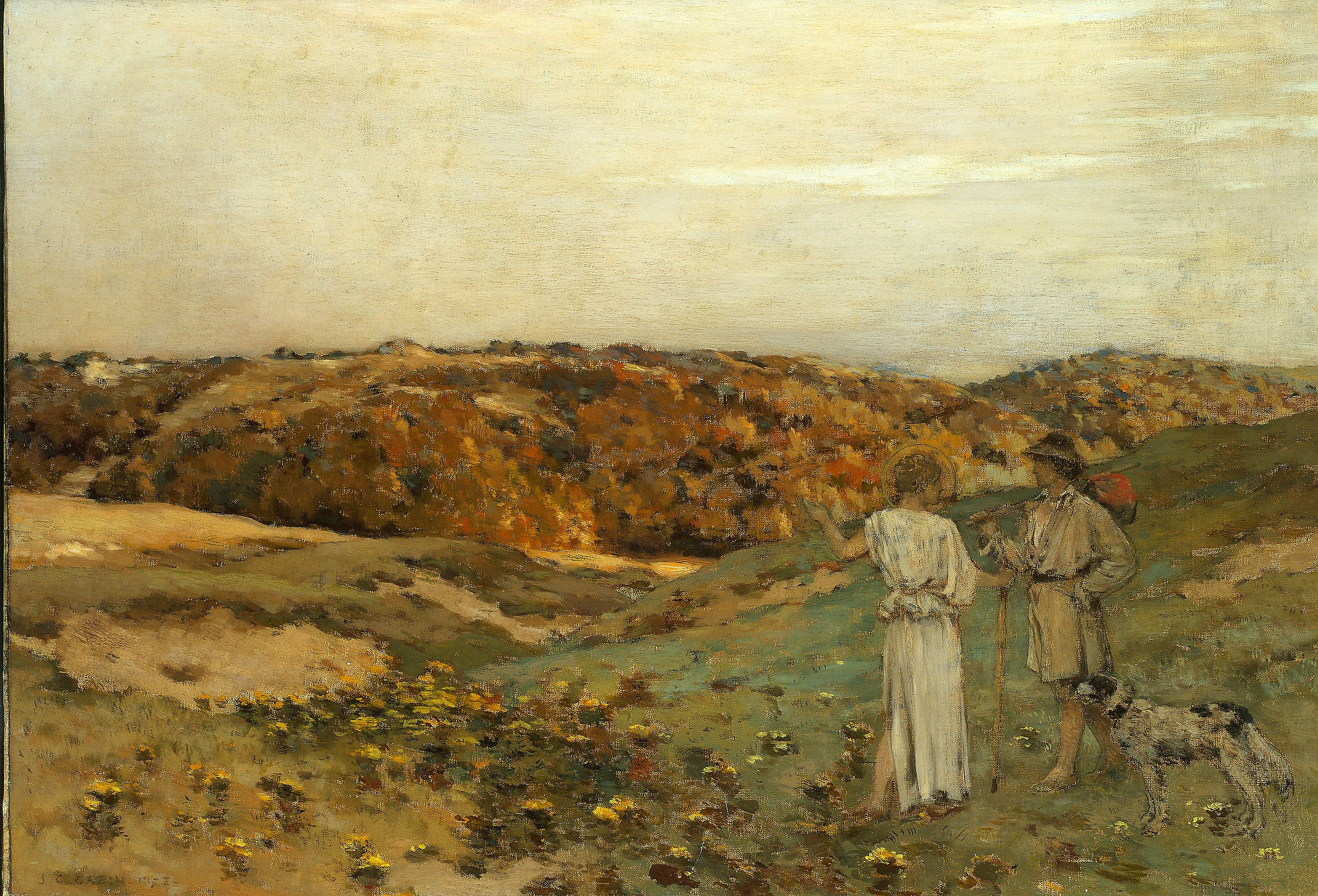
Tobias and the Angel by Jean-Charles Cazin, one of the works which Field's widow gifted to the Art Institute of Chicago

In 1893, Field's widow created "the Henry Field memorial" a special trust administered by her brother Bryan Lathrop, Field's brother Marshall, Owen T. Aldis, Martin A. Ryerson, and Albert A. Sprague. This trust contained all of the oil paintings that Field had owned, except those that were family portraits. The collection was valued, at the time, at $300,000 (~$9.34 million in 2024). This collection totaled 44 oil paintings, many of them from the barbizon school. The included works of Jules Breton, Jean-Charles Cazin, Jean-Baptiste-Camille Corot, John Constable, Charles-François Daubigny Joseph DeCamp, Eugène Delacroix, Édouard Detaille, Narcisse Virgilio Díaz, Jules Dupré, Ernest Hébert, Ludwig Knaus, Jean-François Millet, Henri Rousseau, Adolf Schreyer, Constant Troyon. Through the trust, Field's widow loaned all of these paintings to the Art Institute of Chicago. This was considered the most important accession that the Art Institute of Chicago had received in the fourteen years it had existed. Field's widow would later, on May 26, 1916, make an outright gift of the collection to the museum. Among the pieces in this collection is Breton's The Song of the Lark. Additionally, in 1893, Field's widow commissioned, in his memory, two lion sculptures by Edward Kemeys for the Art Institute of Chicago which adorn the main entrance of the Art Institute of Chicago Building to this day.

In 1895, Field's nephew Marshall Field II would name his newborn son Henry Field.

== Works cited ==
- Funigiello, Philip J. (1994). Florence Lathrop Page: A Biography. University of Virginia Press. ISBN 978-0-8139-1489-3.
