= Florence Lathrop Field Page =

American socialite and philanthropist (1858–1921)

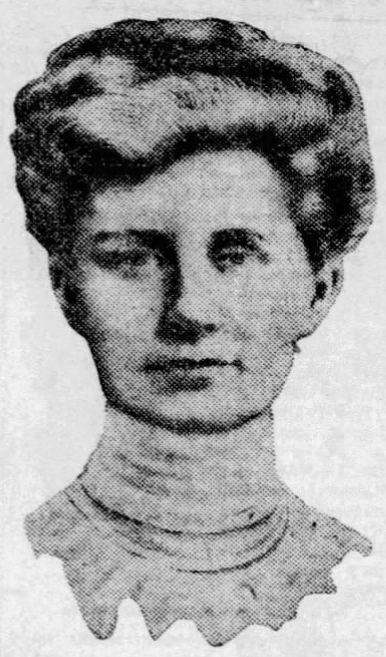
- Born: Florence Lathrop; October 29, 1858; Alexandria, Virginia
- Died: June 6, 1921 (aged 62); Southborough, Massachusetts
- Spouses: Henry Field (m. 1878; died 1890) Thomas Nelson Page (m. 1893)
- Father: Jedediah Hyde Lathrop
- Relatives: Bryan Lathrop (brother); Barbour Lathrop (brother); Daniel Bryan (grandfather); Charles Page Bryan (cousin); Jennie Byrd Bryan Payne (cousin); Thomas Barbour Bryan (uncle); James Barbour (great-uncle); Philip P. Barbour (great-uncle); Thomas Barbour (great-grandfather); Marshall Field (brother-in-law); Andrew Wylie Jr. (uncle)

Florence Lathrop Field Page (October 29, 1858 – June 6, 1921) was an American socialite and philanthropist. Born into the esteemed Barbour family, Page became a notable society figure and philanthropist. Page was considered a member of America's urban elite. She was twice married, first to Henry Field (the brother of Marshall Field), and later to Thomas Nelson Page. In addition to being a member of the Barbour family by birth, through her second marriage she became a member of two additional noted Virginia families: the Nelson and Page families.

== Early life, education, and family ==
Born Florence Lathrop on October 19, 1858, in Alexandria, Virginia. She was the daughter of Jedediah Hyde Lathrop and Mariana Bryan Lathrop (also known as "Minerva" and "Minna"). Her siblings included Bryan Lathrop, Barbour Lathrop, and Minna Lathrop.

She was a descendant of the puritan John Lothropp on her father's side. She was a member of the Barbour family on her mother's side. Her maternal grandmother was Mary Barbour Bryan (the daughter of Thomas Barbour, and the sister of James Barbour and Philip P. Barbour). Her maternal grandfather was Daniel Bryan.

Her family was wealthy, with her father having acquired a sizable fortune through stock investments, as well as banking in association with the Riggs Bank.

Her parents were strong unionists, and, in the lead up to the American Civil War, her family left Alexandria, Virginia to settle in Chicago, Illinois, where their relative Thomas Barbour Bryan (her uncle) had been since 1852. She grew up in the suburb of Cottage Hill, today's Elmhurst, Illinois, a place which her uncle Thomas Barbour Bryan has been regarded as the "father" of. Her family built their "Huntington" estate there in 1864, adjacent to the "Eagles Nest" estate of Thomas Barbour Bryan.

Growing up, Florence was privately tutored at home, before being sent abroad to Paris, France, to finish her education, something which was fashionable for wealthy American families of the day to have their children do. For four years, she would spend several months of the year studying in Paris.

== Adult life ==
=== First marriage ===
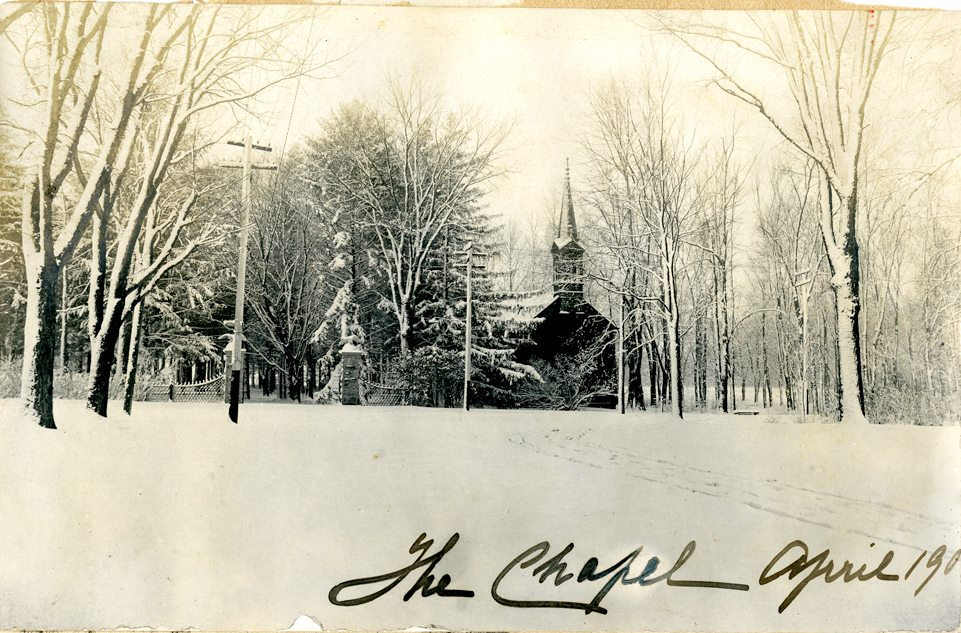
Her wedding to Henry Field, and later wedding to Thomas Nelson Page, took place at Byrd's Nest Chapel, photographed here in 1900.

On October 29, 1879, at the age of 21, she wed the 38 year old Henry Field at the Byrd's Nest Chapel, located between her family's "Huntington" estate and her uncle Thomas Barbour Bryan's "Eagle's Nest" estate in Elmhurst. Henry Field was a junior partner in Field, Leiter & Company, the business of his elder brother Marshall Field. Henry Field was a millionaire.

After their wedding, the two lived abroad in Paris for two years, with Henry Field working as a foreign buyer in Europe for Field, Leiter & Company, which would soon be renamed Marshall Field & Company.

Upon returning to the United States, the Fields resided in Chicago. In March 1882, Florence gave birth to their first child, a daughter who she named after her dead sister Minna (who would later take the name Minna Field Page). In December 1883 she gave birth to her second daughter, who she named Florence (who would ultimately marry into the name Florence Field Lindsay). In 1888, she gave birth to a third daughter, who she named Gladys. Glayds would die eight months after birth.

When the Fields had returned to the United States in 1882, Henry Field had taken a year-long leave from Marshall Field & Company, returning only briefly before retiring from business in 1883, partially due to his failing health. He would return briefly to the company again from 1885 until 1889 before again retiring.

In 1890, three days before Christmas, Henry Field unexpectedly died after a brief sickness. He was buried at Graceland Cemetery, a cemetery which her uncle Thomas Barbour Bryan had founded, and which her brother Bryan Lathrop then served as the president of. As a widow, she was wealthy.

=== Benefactor of the Art Institute of Chicago ===
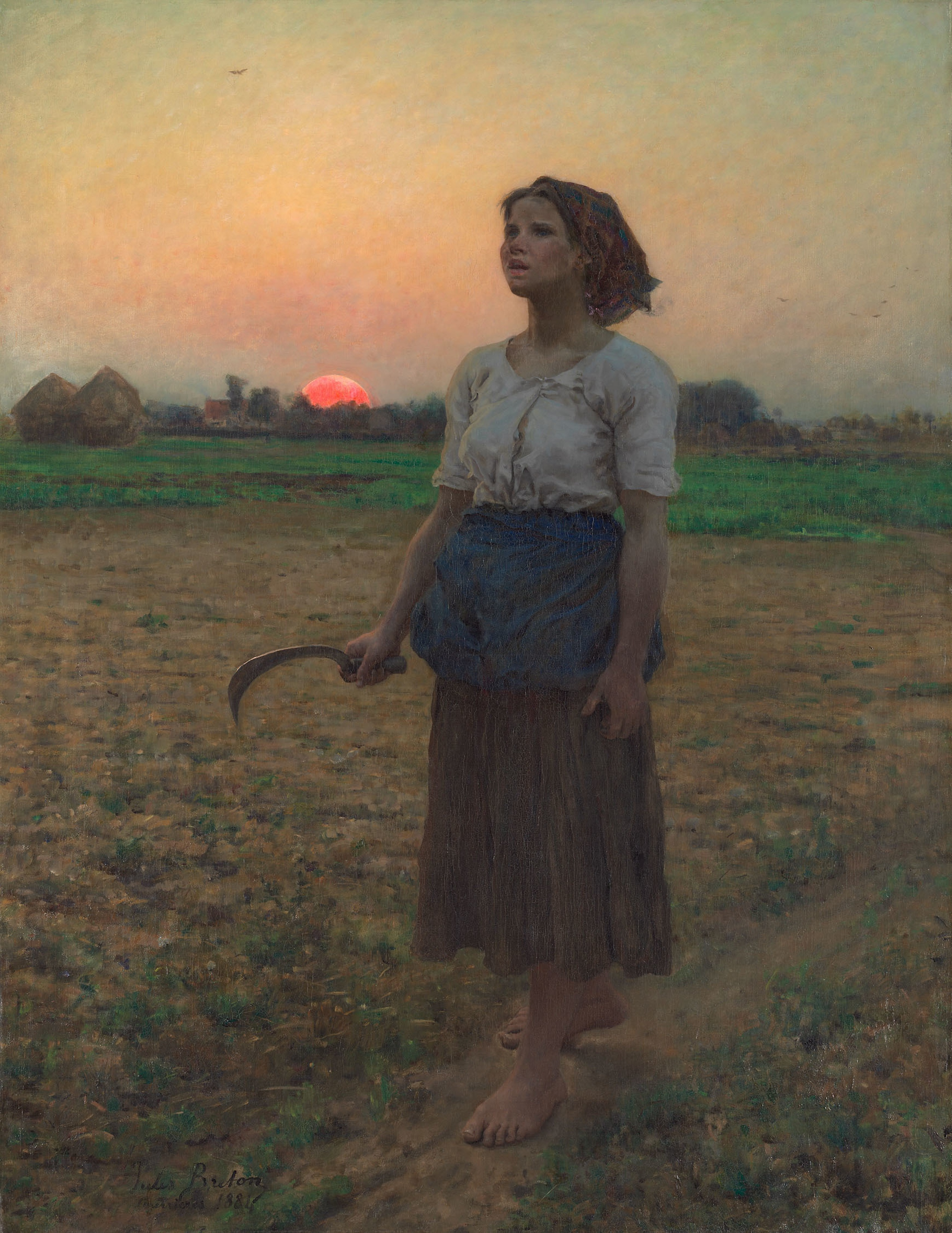
The Song of the Lark, 1884, by Jules Breton, one of the works which she gifted to the Art Institute of Chicago

She was an early benefactor of the Art Institute of Chicago. In 1893, she created "the Henry Field memorial" a special trust administered by her brother Bryan Lathrop, her brother-in-law Marshall Field, Owen T. Aldis, Martin A. Ryerson, and Albert A. Sprague. This trust contained all of the oil paintings that Henry Field had owned, except those that were family portraits. This collection totaled 44 oil paintings, many of them from the barbizon school. The included works of Jules Breton, Jean-Charles Cazin, Jean-Baptiste-Camille Corot, John Constable, Charles-François Daubigny Joseph DeCamp, Eugène Delacroix, Édouard Detaille, Narcisse Virgilio Díaz, Jules Dupré, Ernest Hébert, Ludwig Knaus, Jean-François Millet, Henri Rousseau, Adolf Schreyer, Constant Troyon. Through the trust, she loaned all of these paintings to the Art Institute of Chicago. This was considered the most important accession that the Art Institute of Chicago had received in the fourteen years it had existed. She would later, on May 26, 1916, make an outright gift of the collection to the museum. Additionally, in 1893, she commissioned for the Art Institute two lion sculptures by Edward Kemeys which adorn the main entrance of the Art Institute of Chicago Building to this day.

=== Remarriage ===
Two years after the passing of Henry Field, she met Thomas Nelson Page. Page was a member of the prestigious Nelson and Page families of Virginia. In 1893, he proposed to her. They wed at Byrd's Nest Chapel on June 6, 1893, before sixty relatives and close friends. One of the two reverends who jointly officiated the wedding was Reverend Frank Page, the brother of the groom. The Byrd's Nest Chapel was located at the estate of her uncle Thomas Barbour Bryan and his wife Jennie Byrd Bryan (née Page). Jennie Byrd Bryan was distant cousins with Mr. Page (meaning that the Bryans' children –Jennie and Thomas we’re not only first cousins with her, but also were distant relatives of her new husband).

Soon after marrying, the Pages moved to Washington, D.C. The two would not conceive any children in their marriage. The Pages were considered part of the international café society, and traveled regularly to London, Paris, the Riviera, Rome, and would even travel to Egypt. They spent their summers (from May or June until October) at their summer cottage "Rock Ledge" in York Harbor, Maine.

=== Philanthropic endeavors ===
She was a philanthropist. She donated substantial amounts of money to create public health nursing programs in Chicago, Hanover County, Virginia, New York City, and Washington, D.C. She was a donor to the endowments of Associated Charities of the District of Columbia. She regularly gave to the Chicago Symphony Orchestra (which her brother Bryan Lathrop was also a benefactor of), and continued to regularly give to the Art Institute of Chicago. She endowed the Page-Barbour Lectures at the University of Virginia. She contributed to Episcopal churches, including Washington, D.C.'s St. John's Episcopal Church. In 1915, she organized a large relief program to serve the victims of the 1915 Avezzano earthquake in Italy. She worked to provide relief to the civilian and military casualties in Italy of World War I.

=== Death ===
She died in Southborough, Massachusetts on June 6, 1921. Her estate was estimated to be worth $2,000,000.

== Works cited ==
- Funigiello, Philip J. (1994). Florence Lathrop Page: A Biography. University of Virginia Press. ISBN 978-0-8139-1489-3.
