= Barbour family =

American political family in Virginia, United States

Barbour
- Current region: Virginia
- Origin: Scotland
- Members: James Barbour; John S. Barbour; John S. Barbour, Jr. Philip P. Barbour
- Connected families: Pendleton family Taliaferro family
- Estate: Barboursville

The Barbour family is an American political family of Scottish origin from Virginia. The progenitor of the Barbour family was James Barbour, who emigrated to Virginia from Scotland in the middle of the 17th century.

== Summary of notable members ==
The Barbour family's more notable members included:

- James C. Barbour (10 June 1775 – 7 June 1842), United States Senator, 18th Governor of Virginia, and 11th United States Secretary of War;
- John Strode Barbour, Sr. (8 August 1790 – 12 January 1855), Member of the U.S. House of Representatives from Virginia's 15th congressional district;
- John Strode Barbour, Jr. (29 December 1820 – 14 May 1892), Member of the U.S. House of Representatives from Virginia's 8th congressional district and United States Senator; and
- Philip P. Barbour (25 May 1783 – 25 February 1841), Member of the U.S. House of Representatives from Virginia's 11th congressional district, 12th Speaker of the United States House of Representatives, and Associate Justice of the Supreme Court of the United States.

== Members ==
Members of the Barbour family
- James Barbour I (born 1681) m. Elizabeth Taliaferro (Note: James Barbour I died when sole child (James II) was an infant. His wife, Elizabeth, later remarried.)
  - James Barbour II (1707–1775) m. Elizabeth Todd (1730), m. Sarah Todd (1733) (Note: Richard Barbour was the sole offspring of first wife Elizabeth. His second wife (to whom all his other issue were born) was the sister of his first wife.)
    - Richard Barbour (Note: never married)
    - James Barbour III (1734–1804) m. Frances Throckmorton (1762)
      - Mordecai Barbour (1764–1846) m. Elizabeth Strode, m. Sally Haskell Byrne (Note: First-wife Elizabeth Strode Barbour was the daughter of gun factory owner John Strode, and was of Huguenot descent. Second-wife (Sally) was the widow of James Byrne.)
        - John Strode Barbour (1790–1855) m. Elizabeth A. Byrne (Note: maiden name of Elizabeth Strode Barbour (wife) was "Elizabeth A. Byrne". She was also known by the nickname "Eliza".)
          - Sally
          - John Strode Barbour Jr. (1820–1892) m. Susan Sewell Daingerfield (1865)
          - James Barbour (1828–1895) m. Fanny Thomas Beckham (1857) (Note: Fanny S. Barbour (wife; née Fanny Thomas Beckham) was the daughter of Coleman C. Beckham)
            - Ella B. Barbour Rixey (born 1858) m. John Franklin Rixey (1881)
            - Mary B. Barbour Wallace (born 1860) m. Clarence B. Wallace (1890)
            - James Byrne Barbour (1864–1926)
            - John Strode Barbour (1866–1952) m. Mary B. Grimsley (1894)
            - Edwin Barbour (1868–1902) m. Josie McDonald
            - A. Floyd Barbour (born 1868)
            - Fanny C. Barbour Beckham (born 1874) m. Benjamin Collins Beckham (1899)
          - Alfred Madison Barbour (1829–1866) m. Kate Daniel (1858)
          - Eliza Thompson (née Barbour) m. George G. Thompson
        - Frances Barbour Minor m. Henry Minor (1809)
          - 11 children of Frances Barbour Minor and Henry Minor
        - Nancy Barbour Gist m. Thomas Gist (Note: Nancy was also known as "Ann"))
        - Maria Barbour Tillinghast Hogan m. (?) Tillinghast, m. J. B. Hogan
        - Mordecai Barbour (Note: never married)
        - Mary Walker (née Barbour) m. David Walker
          - Mary Meade (née Walker) m. R. K. Meade (Note: R. K. Meade (husband) was son of Richard Kidder Meade)
            - Helen Meade Call (née Walker) m. William Call
              - Richard K. Call (1792-1862)
              - George W. Call m. Lucinda Lee
                - Wilkinson Call (1834–1910)
          - Fannie Gwynn (née Walker) m. Humphrey Gwynn
          - Helen Browder (née Walker) m. ??? Browder
          - James Volney Walker
          - Jefferson Walker
          - George Walker m. ???
            - children
          - David S. Walker m. Philoclea Alston m. Elizabeth Duncan
            - children
      - James Barbour (Note: never married)
      - Thomas Barbour m. Mary Taylor (Note: Mary Barbour (wife, née Taylor) was the daughter of James Taylor II and granddaughter of George Taylor)
        - James Barbour
        - Gabriel Barbour
        - Nathaniel Barbour
        - Ann Barbour
        - Lucy Barbour
        - Fanny Barbour
        - Edwin Barbour
      - Richard Barbour m. Mary Moore (Note: Mary Barbour (wife, née Moore) was the daughter of Maj. William Moore of Orange)
        - Maria Taylor (née Barbour) m. Jack Taylor
        - Eliza Taylor (née Barbour) m. Robert M. Taylor
        - Lucy Alexander (née Barbour) m. ??? Alexander
        - James Barbour
      - Gabriel Barbour m. Lucy Baylor (Note: Lucy Barbour (wife, née Baylor) was also his niece, being the daughter Frances Throckmorton Baylor (née Barbour) and Wythe Baylor)
        - Winona Cullen (née Barbour) m. ??? Cullen
          - George Appleton Cullen
          - Barbara Cullen
      - Philip Barbour m. Lucy Taylor, m. Eliza Hopkins (Note: Lucy Barbour (second wife, née Hopkins) was the daughter of Samuel Hopkins)
        - Lucy Glass (née Barbour) m. ??? Glass
        - Elizabeth Jones (née Barbour) m. William L. Jones
        - Philip Norborne Barbour (1817–1846) m. Martha Hopkins (Note: Philip Norborne Barbour was born to father's second wife, Eliza Hopkins Barbour. He was his father's sole known offspring. Martha Barbour (wife, née Hopkins) was his first-cousin, the daughter of Jacob Hopkins.)
        - Samuel Barbour m. ??? Clay
        - James Mordecai Barbour m. Lydia A. Scott
          - Anna Cheney (née Barbour) m. Thomas F. Cheney
            - Alice McDaniel (née Cheney, born c. 1860) m. Alfred McDaniel
            - Ruth Ringo (née Cheney) m. James M. Ringo
            - Edith Cheney
            - Philip B. Cheney
            - Harry Cheney
            - Robert Cheney
      - Frances Barbour Moore m. John Moore (1798) (Note: John Moore (husband) was the son of Maj. William Moore of Orange and Mary Throckmorton Moore.)
        - James Barbour Moore (born 1800)
        - William Catlett Moore (born 1802) m. Matilda Taylor
        - John Throckmorton Moore (born 1807) m. Mary Crutchfield
        - Gabrel Barbour (born 1810)
        - Richard Barbour (born 1814) m. ??? Malloy m. Susan Crump
        - Frances Crutchfield (née Frances Throckmorton Moore Barbour, born 1816) m. A. G. Crutchfield
      - Sarah Throckmorton Barbour Harrison m. John "James" Harrison
        - James Harrison m. ??? Tablot
          - 5 children
        - James Harrison m. ??? Tablot
      - Lucy Davis (née Barbour) m. ??? Davis
      - Lucy Barbour Baylor m. Wythe Baylor (1798)
        - Lucy Barbour m. Gabriel Barbour (Note: Gabriel Barbour (husband) was also her uncle, being the son of James Barbour III and Frances Throckmorton)
    - Thomas Barbour (1735–1825) m. Mary Pendleton Thomas (1771) (Note: Mary Pendleton Barbour (wife, née Thomas, 1739–1826) parents are variably identified as either Edmund Thomas and Sarah Pendleton or Richard Thomas and Isabella Pendleton. Her sister Catherine married Barbour's own brother Ambrose.)
      - Richard Barbour
      - James C. Barbour (1775–1842) m. Lucy Maria Johnson (1795) (Note: James Barbour and Lucy Johnson Barbour (wife, née Lucy Maria Johnson, 1775–1860) were first cousins. Lucy's father was Benjamin Johnson and her mother was Elizabeth Barbour Johnson. Lucy was also the sister of Frances Johnson Barbour (née Frances Todd Johnson), who married James' brother Philip.)
        - Lucy Maria Barbour Taliaferro (1797–1843) m. John Seymour Taliaferro (1822) (Note: John Seymour Taliaferro (husband) died in 1830)
          - James Barbour
          - Lucy Maria
          - Frances Cornelia
          - Ann B. Barbour
          - Lindsey Waters (née Lindsey L. Barbour) m. William Smith Waters (1863) (Note: William Smith Waters (husband) died in 1873)
            - John Seymour Taliaferro Waters m. Mary Town Donaldson
            - Lucy Penniman (née Lucy Maria Barbour Waters) m. Charles F. Penniman (1892) (Note: Charles F. Penniman (husband) died in 1892)
              - William S. W. Penniman
        - Benjamin Johnson Barbour (1800–1820)
        - James Barbour (died 1857)
        - Frances Cornelia Barbour Collins m. William Handy Collins
        - 1 additional daughter and 1 additional son of James Barbour and Lucy Johnson Barbour
        - Benjamin Johnson Barbour (1821–1894) m. Caroline Homassel Watson (1844) (Note: Wife Caroline Barbour (née Benjamin Homassel Watson, 1825–1905) was the daughter of Dr. George Watson of Richmond)
          - James Barbour (1846–1851)
          - Anne Watson Barbour (1847–1851)
          - George Watson Barbour (1849–1858)
          - Benjamin Johnson Barbour Jr. (1851–1853)
          - Thomas Barbour (1854–1938)
          - Lucy C. Barbour (1856–1863)
          - George Watson Barbour (1859–1937)
          - Caroline H. Ellis (née Barbour, 1859–c.1943) m. J. H. Ellis
          - William C. Barbour (1865–????)
          - Elise Collins Graves (née Barbour, 1865–????) m. James Graves
          - Frances Cornelia Christian (née Barbour, 1870–1940) m. William G. Christian
      - Lucy Newman (née Lucy T. Barbour, c. 1779–c. 1808) m. Thomas Newman
        - Veranda Welch (née Veranda T. Newman) m. Nathaniel J. Welch (1818)
          - Nathaniel Welch (1822–1857) m. Julia Dorothy Coates (1844) Roberts (Note: spouse lived 1826–1906. Had previously been married to William F. Roberts. She had had two children with her first husband: Milton Arthur Roberts and Julia Whaley (née Roberts).)
            - Ella Welch (1851–1934)
            - Sue Tompkins Welch (1847–1930)
            - Joyce Evelyn Welch (1855–1943)
            - William Tunstall Welch (born 1853) m. Louise Lee (Note: spouse born in circa 1854)
        - Lucetta Macon (née Newman) m. James Mason Macon
        - James Babrour Newman m. Sarah "Sallie" Battaile Fitzhugh (1830)
          - several children
          - Julia Newman (1831–1876)
          - Laura Newman (born 1832)
          - Thomas Henry Newman
          - Conway Newman
          - James Barbour Newman m. Fannie Tabitha Gordon (1870) (Note: wife lived 1847–1922)
            - Alice Newman (1870-???)
            - Elizabeth Thornton (née Elizabeth Gordon Newman, 1873–1943) m. Arthur Presley Thornton
              - Barbour Newman Thornton (1903–1981) m. Jane Riddle
                - Mary Moylan Thornton Oppenhimer m. (?) Oppenheimer
                - Tabb Thornton Farinholt
              - Frances Gordon Thornton Milton Folkes (1909–2007) m. William Byrd Lee Milton m. Mintree Folkes (1945) (Note: first husband died in 1941, second husband died in 1959)
                - Elizabeth Milton Hunnewell m. Frances Oakes Hunnewell
                  - Susannah Hunnewell Weiss
                  - Evelyn Byrd Lee Hunnewell
                  - Oakes Hunnewell Jr.
          - Rosa Newman
          - Fitzhugh Newman
        - Thomas Newman (Note: died as child)
        - Wilhelma C. Newman
      - Philip P. Barbour (1783–1841) m. Frances Todd Johnson (1804) (Note: Philip P. Barbour and Frances Todd Barbour (wife, née Johnson) were first cousins. Frances's father was Benjamin Johnson and her mother was Elizabeth Barbour Johnson. Frances was also the sister of Lucy Johnson Barbour (née Lucy Maria Johnson), who married Philip's brother James.)
        - Edmund Pendleton Barbour (1805–1851) m. Harriet Stewart (Note: Harriet Barbour (wife, née Stewart) was the daughter of Col. John Stewart of King George County, Virginia)
          - Philippa Barbour
          - Mary Conway Barbour
          - Edmonia de Peyen des Bellisle (née Barbour) m. Rene de Peyen des Bellisle
        - Philippa Field (née Philippa Barbour, 1807–1860) m. R. H. Field
          - Philip Field (d. 1862)
          - Fanny Norville (née Field) m. Charles Norville
        - Elizabeth Barbour Ambler (1808–1857) m. John Jaquelin Ambler (1828) (Note: John Jaquelin Ambler (husband) also known as J. J. Ambler)
          - John J. Ambler m. Bessie B. Davis
          - Philip B. Ambler m. Miss Willie Nicholas
            - Nicholas Ambler
          - Ella Nicholas (née Ella Cory Ambler) m. John Nicholas
        - Quintus Barbour m. Mary Elizabeth Somerville (1833) (Note: Mary Barbour (wife, née Mary Elizabeth Somerville) was the daughter of James Somerville of Culpeper, Virginia)
          - Philip Pendleton Barbour II (1839–1914)
          - Frances Todd Barbour Ewing m. D. B. Ewing (Note: also known as "Fanny L. Ewing")
          - Cornelia Barbour
          - James Somerville Barbour
          - Jane F. Barbour
        - Sextus Barbour (1813–1848) (Note: never married)
        - Septimus Barbour (1815–1816)
        - Thomas Barbour (1810–1849) m. Sarah Ann Strother (Note: Wife Sarah Ann Strother Barbour (also known as "Catherine") was the youngest daughter of John Strother)
          - Fanny Gray (née Barbour) m. (?) Gray
          - Thomas Barbour m. (?) Gamble
          - John Barbour
        - 9 other children of Philip P. Barbour and Mary Pendleton Thomas
      - Nelly Nolle (née Barbour) m. Martin Nolle
        - Philip P. Nolle m. Elizabeth Wallace
        - Cordelia Hidden (née Nolle) m. Joseph Hidden (Note: Joseph Hidden (husband) was son to Rev. J. C. Hidden (who married Miss Chewning), but was not Cordelia's biological son.)
        - Edmonia Major (née Nolle) m. William Major
        - Fanny Hansborough (née Nolle) m. John C. Hansborough
        - Martinet Hansborough (née Nolle) m. Blucher W. Hansborough
        - Lucetta Bouton (née Nolle) m. George Bouton
        - Josephine Clarke (née Nolle) m. Edward M. Clark
        - Edmund P. Nolle m. Miss Wallace m. Miss Robertson
        - Sarah Scott (née Sarah Ellen Nolle) m. Garrett Scott
        - Mary Willis (née Nolle) m. Richard A. Willis
        - John Nolle
        - James Barbour Nolle
      - Mary Thomas Bryan (1795–c. 1852) m. Daniel Bryan (1818) (Note: Daniel Bryan (husband) lived 1789–1866)
        - Mariana Bryan Lathrop (1820–1893) m. Jedediah Hyde Lathrop (Note: Jedediah Hyde Lathrop (husband) lived 1806–1889 Mariana Bryan Lathrop (née Mariana Ann Bryan) also was known by the nicknames of "Mary Ann", "Minerva" and "Minna".)
          - Bryan Lathrop (1844–1916)
          - Barbour Lathrop (1847–1927)
          - Caroline Huntington Lathrop (1853–1854)
          - Minna Byrd Lathrop (1857–1877)
          - Florence Lathrop Field Page (1858–1921) m. Henry Field (1883) m. Thomas Nelson Page (1893) (Note: Henry Field (first husband) lived 1841–1890; Thomas Nelson Page (second husband) lived 1853–1922 Had no children.)
        - Mary Caroline Wylie (1825—1896) m. Andrew Wylie Jr. (Note: Mary Caroline Wylie née Bryan often was referred to by her middle-name.)
          - Andrew Wylie (1847—1858) (Note: died as child)
          - Pendleton Wylie (1858–1869) (Note: died as child)
          - Horace Wylie (1868–1960) m. Katherine Virginia Hopkins (1895) m. Elinor Hoyt Hichborn (1916) (Note: Katherine Virginia Hopkins (first wife) was the daughter of James Herron Hopkins, marriage ended in a divorce formalized in 1816 (six years after Horace Wylie ran away in hopes of eloping with Elinor Hoyt Hichborn);)
            - Craig Wylie (1908–1976) m. Angela Ludlow Fowler (1938)
              - Andrew Wylie (b.1947) m. Christina (1969) m. second wife (1980)
                - Nikolas Wylie
            - 5 other children of Horace Wiley and Katherine Hopkins
          - Andrew S. Wylie (1870–1871)
        - Sally Brown (née Bryan) m. ???? Brown
        - Thomas Barbour Bryan (1828–1906) m. Jennie Byrd Bryan (1850)
          - Daniel Page Bryan (????-1855) (Note: died as a child)
          - Charles Page Bryan (1855–1918) (Note: no record of marriage or children)
          - Jennie Byrd Bryan Payne (1857—1919) m. John Barton Payne (1913) (Note: had no children)
        - William Bryan
      - Sally Gray (née Barbour) m. Grabriel Gray
        - Rebecca Lake (née Gray) m. Sheton Lake
        - Martha Anderson (née Gray) m. William L. Anderson (Note: William L. Anderson (husband) died in 1862 in the Battle of Seven Pines)
        - Philippa Anderson (née Gray) m. R. W. Anderson
          - John Gray Anderson
        - Lucy Cowles (née Gray)
        - John Gray
    - Philip Chesterfield Stanhope Barbour Sr. (born circa 1737) m. (?)
      - Philip Chesterfield Stanhope Barbour Jr. (c. 1787–1861) m. Margaret Pollock
        - Jane Pollock Taylor (née Barbour, born circa 1810) m. William Dabney Strother Taylor (Note: Husband William Dabney Strother Taylor (1782–1808) was the son of Richard Taylor and Sarah Dabney Strother Taylor. Both his younger brother Zachary Taylor and his maternal second-cousin James Madison served as presidents of the United States. His maternal grandparents were William Strother of Orange, Virginia and Sarah Strother (née Bayley or Bailey). He was a descendant of Elder William Brewster (a Pilgrim leader of the Plymouth Colony, a Mayflower immigrant, and a signer of the Mayflower Compact), Isaac Allerton Jr. (a colonial merchant, colonel, and son of Mayflower Pilgrim Isaac Allerton), and Fear Brewster. He was also a member of the Lee family of Virginia, including a third-cousin once-removed of Confederate General Robert E. Lee.)
          - Hancock Taylor (born 1838–c. 1920) m. Mary Hooe Wallace
            - Arthur Wallace Taylor (1866–1898) m. Bessie S. Roberson
            - Margaret Barbour Wallace (née Taylor) m. Arthur Maxwell Wallace
            - Letitia "Letty" Taylor Grafton (1870–1825) m. Thomas Buie Grafton
              - Arthur Wallace Grafton Sr. (1907–1985) m. Paola Castanendo Copeland m. Betty Lou Mikell
                - Arthur Wallace Grafton Sr. (1937–1923)
              - Cornelius Warren Wallace (1909–1982) m. Vivian Boisseau Harnsberger
            - Hancock Taylor Jr. (1872–1904) m. Sarah "Sadie" Downer Wilcox (c. 1903) (Note: wife lived 1879–1925, and was previously married to Barker Jessup who died in 1903 and with whom she had had three children. Later remarried a second time to David Carl Farnsworth, and died as "Sarah Downer Farnsworth".)
            - Marie Strother Taylor (1874–1971)
            - Fanny Tarlton Taylor (1876–1876)
            - Willie Pollock Taylor (1877–1963)
            - Hellen Lee Wallace Quarles (née Taylor) (born 1881) m. James Cowardin Quarles
        - Philip David Barbour (c. 1818–1881) m. Comfort Ann Dorsey (1842) m. Frances B. "Fannie" Newman (1852) (Note: first wife (mother of eldest three children) lived 1824–1848; second wife (mother of remaining children) lived 1829–1901)
          - John Dorsey Barbour (1843–1918)
          - Philip Chesterfield Stanhope Barbour (1845–1899) m. Rebecca Owings Tarleton (1868) (Note: Wife lived 1849–1937)
            - Mary Comfort Barbour (1869–1870)
            - Richard Tarleton Barbour (1871–1872)
            - Philip David Barbour (1873–1950)
            - Anne Tarleton Barbour (1875–1964)
          - Mary E. C. Barbour (1847–1884)
          - James P. Barbour (1853–1890)
          - William S. Barbour (1853–1890)
          - Richard Newman Barbour (1857–1902)
          - Sallie A. Barbour (1859–1888)
          - Margaret P. Barbour (1860–1934)
          - Sheridan Lee Barbour (1864–1950) m. Maude Elizabeth Hitte Hill (Note: wife lived 1872–1957)
            - Maud Hite Barbour (1897–1897)
            - Elizabeth Randolph Barbour (1898–1984)
            - Alice Muriel Chapman (née Barbour, 1903–1925) m. Walter Gibbs Chapman (1920)
              - Elizabeth "Betty" Barbour Chapman Brannin (1926–2018) m. Jafie R. Brannin
                - Jeffrey L. Brannin
                - Bonnie Brannan Lander m. Art Lander Jr.
                  - Laura Powers m. (?) Powers
                    - James Powers
                    - Charlotte Powers
                  - John Lander m. (?)
                  - Maggie Lander
              - Edith Chapman Nerone (née Edith Gaither Chapman, 1932–1992) m. Francis A. Nerone (1954) (Note: husband lived 1930–2022, and was the son of Alexander A. Nerone and (?) Nerone)
          - Edmond Randolph Barbour (1868–1916)
          - Fannie Butler Barbour (1871–1923)
    - Ambrose Barbour (born c. 1733) m. Catherine Pendleton Thomas (Note: Catherine Barbour (wife, née Thomas) was the daughter of Richard Thomas and Isabella Pendleton. Her sister Mary married Barbour's own brother Thomas.)
      - Philip Barbour (died 1794) (Note: never married)
      - James Barbour m. Letitia Green (Note: Letitia Green Barbour (wife) was the daughter of Willis Green and Sarah Reed Green)
        - Catherine Ann Barbour Vick (1818–1867) m. John Wesley Vick (1845) (Note: John Wesley Vick (husband, 1808–1888). Member of the titular Vick family of Vicksburg, Mississippi. She was his third wife.)
          - John Wesley Vick
          - Kate
          - Martha
          - Nanie
          - Amanda
        - James Barbour m. Elizabeth Foster
          - James F. Barbour m. Elizabeth Taylor
          - John Green Foster Barbour
        - Martha Hobson (née Barbour) m. B. M. Hobson
          - Barbour Hobson
          - Lewis Green Hobson
        - Lewis Green Barbour (1829–1907) m. Elizabeth Ann Ford (1854) (Note: Elizabeth Ann Barbour (wife, née Ford, 1835–1921))
          - Philip Foster Barbour (1867–1944) m. Jessie E. Lemont (1891) (Note: Barbour and his wife Jessie (1872–1947) were granted a divorce on December 13, 1904. The former Jessie Barbour was remarried on July 13, 1913 to Otto Johannes "Hans" Trausil.)
            - Ruth Barbour (born 1892)
            - Margaret Barbour (born 1894)
            - Philip Lemont Barbour (1898–1980) m. Consuelo Seggerman (1926) (Note: Philip Barbour and Consuelo Barbour (wife, née Seggerman; February 24, 1902–January 1, 1973) were granted a divorce in 1929, and her maiden name was restored thereafter.)
          - James Barbour
          - Bessie
          - Caroline
      - Lucinda Barbour Hardin m. Benjamin Hardin
        - Lucinda B. Hardin m. John L. Helm (1830) (Note: John L. Helm (husband) lived 1802–1867)
          - Benjamin Hardin Helm (1831-1863) m. Emilie Pariet Todd (1856) (Note: Emilie Pariet Helm (wife, née Todd) was the daughter of Robert Smith Todd and half-sister of Mary Todd Lincoln (who was first lady of the United States 1861–1865))
          - Lucinda Barbour Helm
          - 9 other children of Lucinda Barbour Helm and John L. Hardin
        - other children of Lucinda Barbour Hardin and Benjamin Hardin
      - Richard Barbour
      - Lucy Barbour Davis m. (?) Davis
    - William Barbour
    - Mary Barbour Harrison m. John Harrison
      - ??? Mason (née Harrison) m. ???
      - James Barbour Mason Sr. m. ??? Logan (Note: Wife was daughter of Hugh Logan)
        - James Barbour Mason Jr.
    - Fanny Barbour Smith m. (?) Smith
    - Elizabeth Barbour Johnson m. Benjamin Johnson (Note: Was better known bas "Betty" or "Bettie")
      - Lucy Johnson Barbour (née Lucy Maria Johnson, 1775–1860) m. James Barbour (1795) (Note: She and her husband were first cousins. Husband was a son of Thomas Barbour. He was also the brother of Philip Barbour, who married her sister Frances.)
        - (see earlier for offspring; spouses were first-cousins)
      - Frances Johnson Barbour (née Frances Todd Johnson) m. Philip P. Barbour (1804) (Note: She and her husband were first cousins. Husband was a son of Thomas Barbour. He was also the brother of James Barbour, who married her sister Lucy.)
        - (see earlier for offspring; spouses were first-cousins)
    - (?) Barbour Boyd m. James Boyd
