= Daniel Bryan (Virginia politician) =

American politician (1789–1866)

Postmaster of Alexandria, Virginia
- In office April 8, 1821 – 1853
- President: James Monroe; John Quincy Adams; Andrew Jackson; Martin Van Buren; William Henry Harrison; James K. Polk; Zachary Taylor; Millard Fillmore
- Preceded by: Josiah Watson
- Succeeded by: Turner W. Ashby

Virginia State Senator
- In office 1818–1821

Personal details
- Born: 1789 Rockingham County, Virginia, U.S.
- Died: December 22, 1866 (aged 76–77) Washington, D.C., U.S.
- Resting place: Oak Hill Cemetery, Washington, D.C.
- Spouse(s): Rebecca Davenport (m. 1815; died 1816) Mary Thomas Barbour (m. 1818; died 1852)
- Children: 5 (including Thomas Barbour Bryan)
- Relatives: James Barbour (brother-in-law); Philip P. Barbour (brother-in-law); Thomas Barbour (father-in-law); Charles Page Bryan (grandson); Barbour Lathrop (grandson); Bryan Lathrop (grandson); Florence Lathrop Field Page (granddaughter); Jennie Byrd Bryan Payne (granddaughter); Andrew Wylie (son-in-law)

Daniel Bryan (1789 – December 22, 1866) was an American politician, abolitionist, lawyer, poet, and postmaster who served in the Senate of Virginia from 1818 to 1820 and as postmaster of Alexandria, Virginia for more than three decades. Bryan married into the prestigious Barbour family in his second marriage.

== Early life ==
Bryan was born in 1789 in rural Rockingham County, Virginia. There is disagreement on whether Bryan's maternal uncle was Daniel Boone. Boone had a nephew named Daniel Bryan; however, there is evidence to indicate that this was a different person. It is likely that the politician and poet Daniel Bryan was more distantly related to Boone.) If he was Boone's nephew, then Bryan's father would have been William Bryan, one of the founders of Bryan Station, and his mother Mary Boone Bryan, sister of Boone. Bryan attended Washington Academy (today's Washington and Lee University), but did not graduate. He read law at home.

== Career ==
Bryan served in the War of 1812. In 1813, he published his first book, The Mountain Muse, which mainly consisted of the 5,600 line poem "The Adventures of Daniel Boone". This book made him relatively well-known. Bryan practiced as a lawyer. Bryan also worked as a teacher.

Bryan married Rebecca Davenport on October 15, 1815, but she died the following year, widowing Bryan. On April 8, 1818, Bryan married Mary Thomas Barbour, who became Mary Thomas Bryan. She was a member of the esteemed Barbour family Marrying into the esteemed Barbour family, Bryan's new brothers-in-law were James Barbour and Philip P. Barbour, and his new father-in-law was Thomas Barbour. In the 1820s, he also garnered a reputation as a talented orator. He sometimes delivered speeches in verse.

In 1818, Bryan was elected to serve in the Senate of Virginia. His seat sat in Rockingham County and Shenandoah County. Being an abolitionist, on January 26, 1820, Bryan cast the lone vote in the Virginia Senate against advocating for the admission of Missouri as a slave state. He delivered a passionate speech, denouncing the institution of slavery in the United States and calling for gradual emancipation. This placed him in direct opposition to the stances held by his brothers-in-law, who supported the admission of Missouri as a slave state.

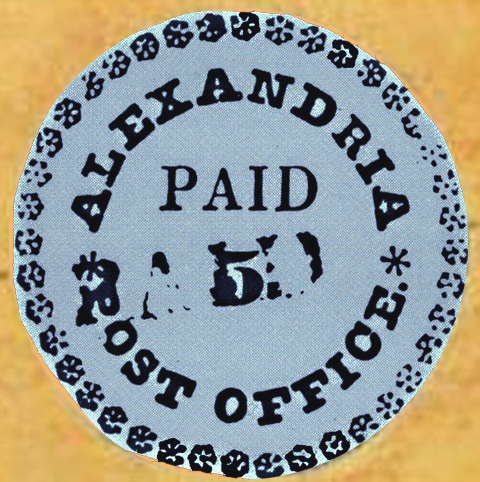
The Alexandria "Blue Boy" Postmaster's Provisional, a postmasters provisional stamp issued by Bryan during his tenure as postmaster of Alexandria, Virginia

On April 8, 1821, Bryan was appointed postmaster of Alexandria, Virginia, and began what was a more than three-decade tenure in this job. Postmasters were presidentially appointed at the time, and Bryan's tenure spanned the presidencies of James Monroe, John Quincy Adams, Andrew Jackson, Martin Van Buren, William Henry Harrison, James K. Polk, Zachary Taylor and Millard Fillmore. During his tenure as postmaster he issued postmasters provisional stamps, including the Alexandria "Blue Boy" Postmaster's Provisional, which has become extremely rare (only one known example remains), holding the record for the highest priced cover of United States philately.

With Bryan not being present at the Virginia State Capitol in Richmond at the start of the new 1821 legislative session, the Senate declared his seat vacant, thus ending his tenure. Shortly after his service in the Senate of Virginia ended, he began publishing his poetry in periodicals, often anonymously using only his initials, and also began publishing them in short books. The 1820s yielded the most poetry from him of any decade of his life. Notable works included the 1826 works The Lay of Gratitude (1826), a tribute he wrote to the Marquis de Lafayette, and The Appeal for Suffering Genius, which called for support to be given to suffering artists. Throughout his career as a poet, his style remained consistent, and his works espoused strong nationalism, as well as vocalized support for reform causes such as temperance, the education of women, and the movement to end dueling. His poetry was of the neoclassical genre.

In approximately 1852, Bryan was widowed again when Mary Thomas Barbour died. In 1853, Bryan resigned as postmaster in order to take a job in the United States Department of the Treasury's library. During the American Civil War, he opposed secession, and remained a strong unionist, but continued living in Virginia. Two daughters (Mary Caroline Bryan Wylie and Mariana Bryan Lathrop) moved to Pennsylvania for safety. Mariana's husband and entire family moved with her, while Mary Caroline's husband took refuge apart from her in Washington, D.C.

== Personal life ==
Bryan married Rebecca Davenport on October 15, 1815; she died the following year, widowing Bryan. On April 8, 1818, Bryan married Mary Thomas Barbour, who became Mary Thomas Bryan. His wife was a member of the esteemed Barbour family. She died circa 1852. His children were:

- Mariana Bryan Lathrop (b. 1820), who married Jedediah Hyde Lathrop in 1843 (with whom she had several children, including Barbour Lathrop, Bryan Lathrop, and Florence Lathrop Field Page).
- Mary Caroline Wylie (1825–1896, née Bryan), who married Andrew Wylie in 1845 (with whom she had four children, with son Horace being the only of their children who survived into adulthood)
- Sally Brown (née Bryan)
- Thomas Barbour Bryan (1828–1906), who married Jennie Byrd Page in 1850 (with whom he had three children, including Charles Page Bryan and Jennie Byrd Bryan Payne).
- William Bryan

After the Civil War, Bryan and his wife moved to Washington, D.C., where he died on December 22, 1866. He was buried at Oak Hill Cemetery in Washington, D.C.
