= Jedediah Hyde Lathrop =

American merchant (1806–1889)

Collector of the Port of Buffalo
- In office 1842–1845
- Appointed by: John Tyler
- Preceded by: George W. Clinton
- Succeeded by: Henry W. Rogers

Personal details
- Born: July 5, 1806 Lebanon, New Hampshire
- Died: November 23, 1889 (aged 83) Chicago, Illinois
- Resting place: Graceland Cemetery
- Spouse: Mary Ann Bryan (m. 1843)
- Children: Bryan Lathrop; Barbour Lathrop; Caroline Huntington Lathrop; Minna Byrd Lathrop; Florence Lathrop Field Page

Jedediah Hyde Lathrop (July 5, 1806 – November 23, 1889) was an American merchant.

== Early life ==
Lathrop was born on July 5, 1806, in Lebanon in Grafton County, New Hampshire. He was a younger son of Lois (née Huntington) Lathrop (1765–1846) and Samuel Lathrop (1756–1821), a soldier in the Revolutionary War.

A descendant of the puritan John Lothropp, his paternal grandparents were Elisha Lathrop and Hannah (née Hough) Lathrop. His maternal grandparents were Theophelus Huntington and Lois (née Gifford) Huntington.

== Career ==
In 1842, Lathrop was appointed by President John Tyler to succeed George W. Clinton as the Collector of the Port of Buffalo, serving in that position until 1845. He acquired a sizable fortune through stock investments, as well as banking associated with the Riggs Bank. Following the Great Chicago Fire of 1871, he made several large investments in Chicago real estate that greatly increased his wealth.

Lathrop and his wife were strong unionists, and, in the leadup to the American Civil War, the family left Alexandria, Virginia, to settle in Chicago, where his wife's brother, Thomas Barbour Bryan, had been living since 1852. They settled in the suburb of Cottage Hill, today's Elmhurst, Illinois, where they built their "Huntington" estate in 1864, adjacent to Bryan's "Eagles Nest".

== Personal life ==
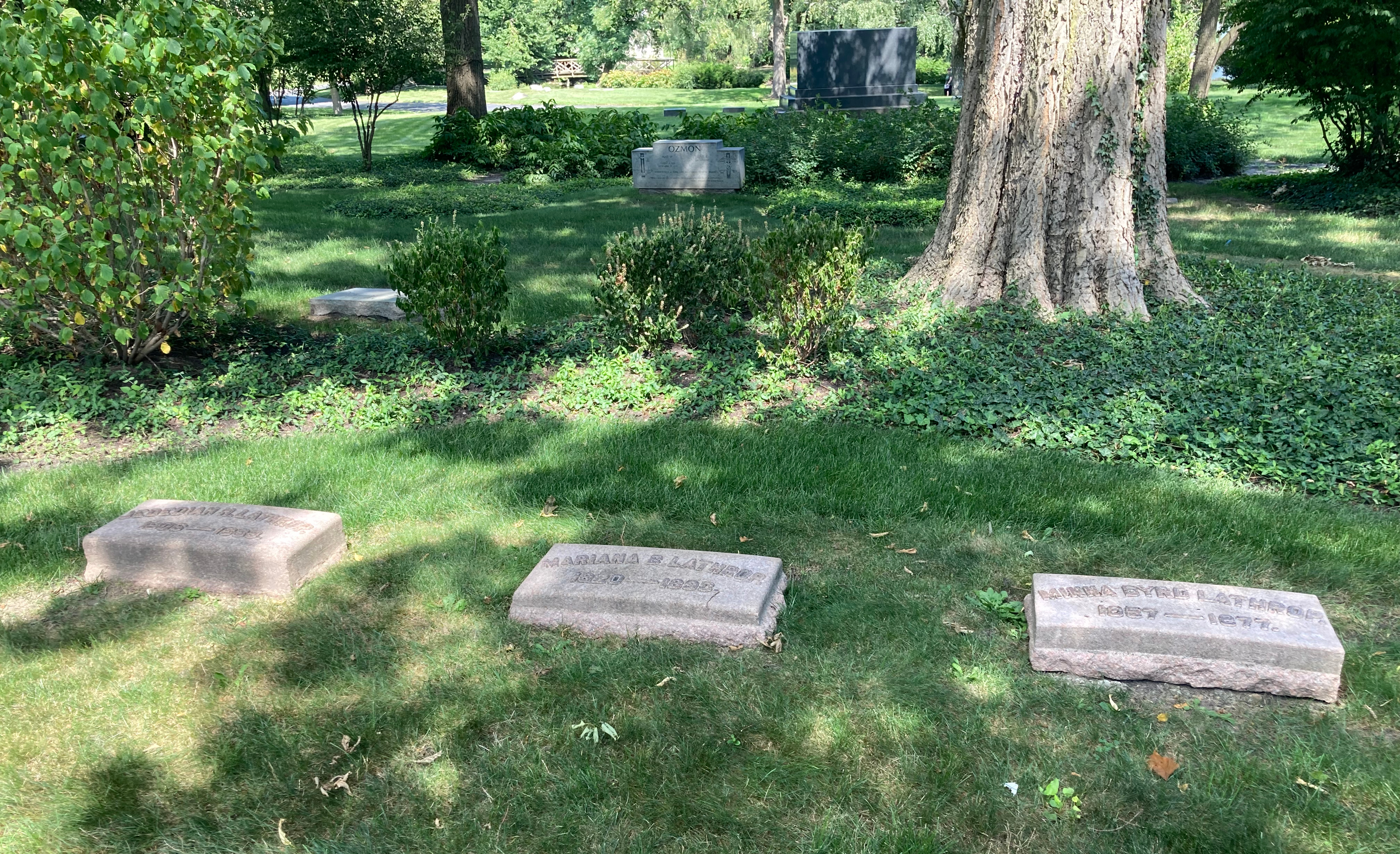
Lathrop's grave (left) at Graceland Cemetery

In 1843, Lathrop was married to Mary Ann Bryan (1820–1893), a daughter of Virginia State Senator Daniel Bryan and Mary Thomas (née Barbour) Bryan (the daughter of Thomas Barbour and sister to Gov. James Barbour and U.S. Representative and Supreme Court Justice Philip P. Barbour). Her brother was philanthropist Thomas Barbour Bryan. Together, they were the parents of:

- Bryan Lathrop (1844–1916), a real estate developer who married Helen Lynde Aldis, daughter of Asa Owen Aldis, in 1875.
- Barbour Thomas Lathrop (1847–1927)
- Caroline Huntington Lathrop (1853–1854), who died young.
- Minna Byrd Lathrop (1857–1877), who died unmarried.
- Florence Wentworth Lathrop (1858–1921), who married Henry Field, younger brother of Marshall Field, in 1879. After his death in 1890, she married Thomas Nelson Page, the U.S. Ambassador to Italy during World War I, in 1893.

Lathrop died on November 23, 1889, in Chicago, and was buried at Graceland Cemetery.
