= Lions (Kemeys) =

Pair of lion statues in Chicago, Illinois, U.S.

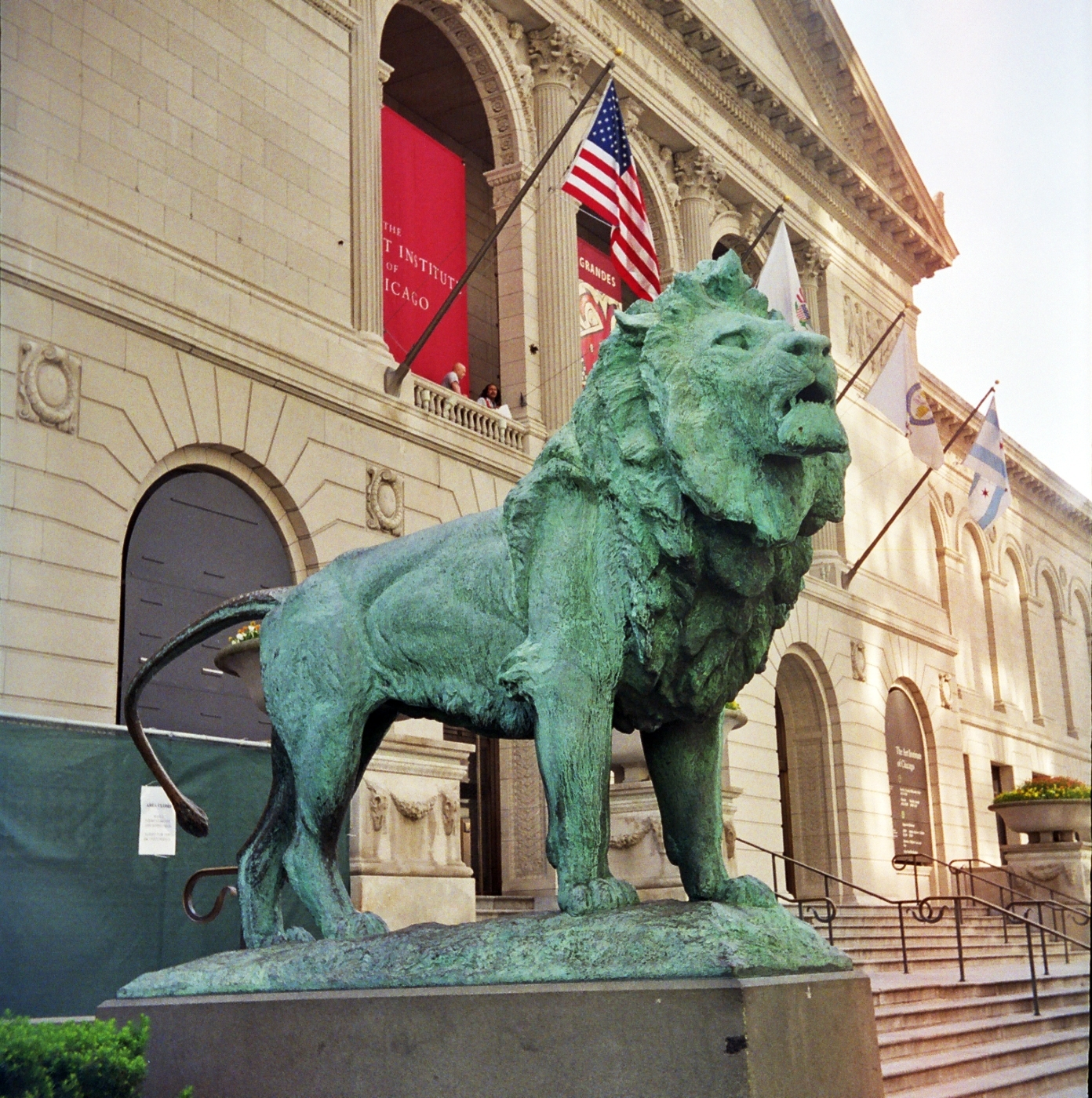
- The northern sculpture in 2006
- Artist: Edward Kemeys
- Year: 1893; 133 years ago
- Medium: Bronze sculpture
- Subject: Lions
- Location: Chicago, Illinois, U.S.; 41°52′46.0″N 87°37′26.8″W

Lions is a pair of 1893 bronze sculptures by Edward Kemeys, installed outside of the main entrance to the Art Institute of Chicago in Chicago, Illinois. The sculptures are well-recognized public artworks.

The sculptures were commissioned by Florence Lathrop Field as a gift to the museum in memory of her late husband Henry Field.

== Description ==
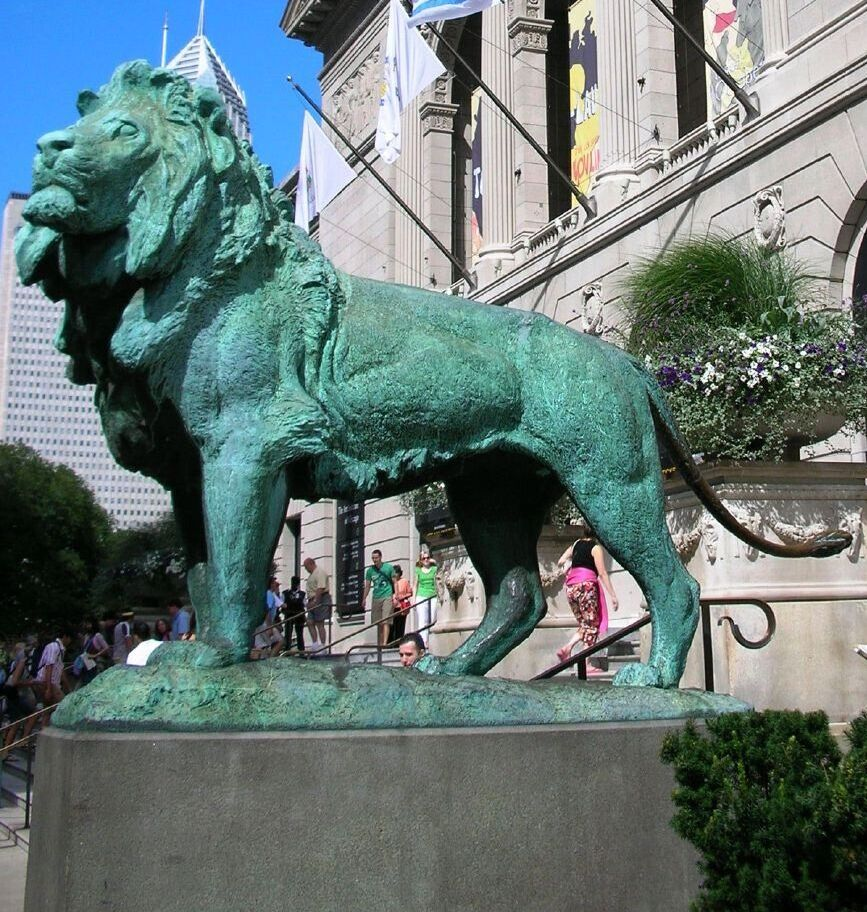
Southern sculpture, photographed in 2005

The bronze sculptures are modeled after African lions. Each sculpture weighs more than two tons. The northern sculpture weighs approximately 5,100 pounds (2,300 kg). They are approximately 10 feet (3.0 m) in length. Today, the sculptures have a green patina. The sculptures flank the outside of the main entrance to the Art Institute of Chicago Building (home to the Art Institute of Chicago), being located along the east side of South Michigan Avenue at the road's intersection with East Adams Street in the city of Chicago in the U.S. state of Illinois. The sculptures have occasionally been referred to as the "great protectors".

The artist, Edward Kemeys, described the statues as "guarding the building." Both are depicted in active poses. Kemeys described the northern lion as positioned "on the prowl," and said that it "has his back up, and is ready for a roar and a spring." He described the southern lion as positioned "in an attitude of defiance" and "attracted by something in the distance which he is closely watching." Kemeys referred to the design of the southern sculpture as "the most difficult I have ever attempted." Kemeys was a leading figure in America's animalier arts movement. Like other artists in the animalier movement (which began in France), he studied living animals as inspiration for his works.

The sculptures are often described as being bronze re-castings of temporary plaster lion sculptures that Kemeys had created for display on the grounds of the 1893 World's Columbian Exposition outside of the Palace of Fine Arts (today's Museum of Science and Industry building). However, documents and photographs from the World's Fair contradict this claim, indicating instead that the lion sculptures displayed at the World's Columbian Exposition had been created by A. Phimister Proctor and Theodore Baur rather than Kemeys.

== History ==
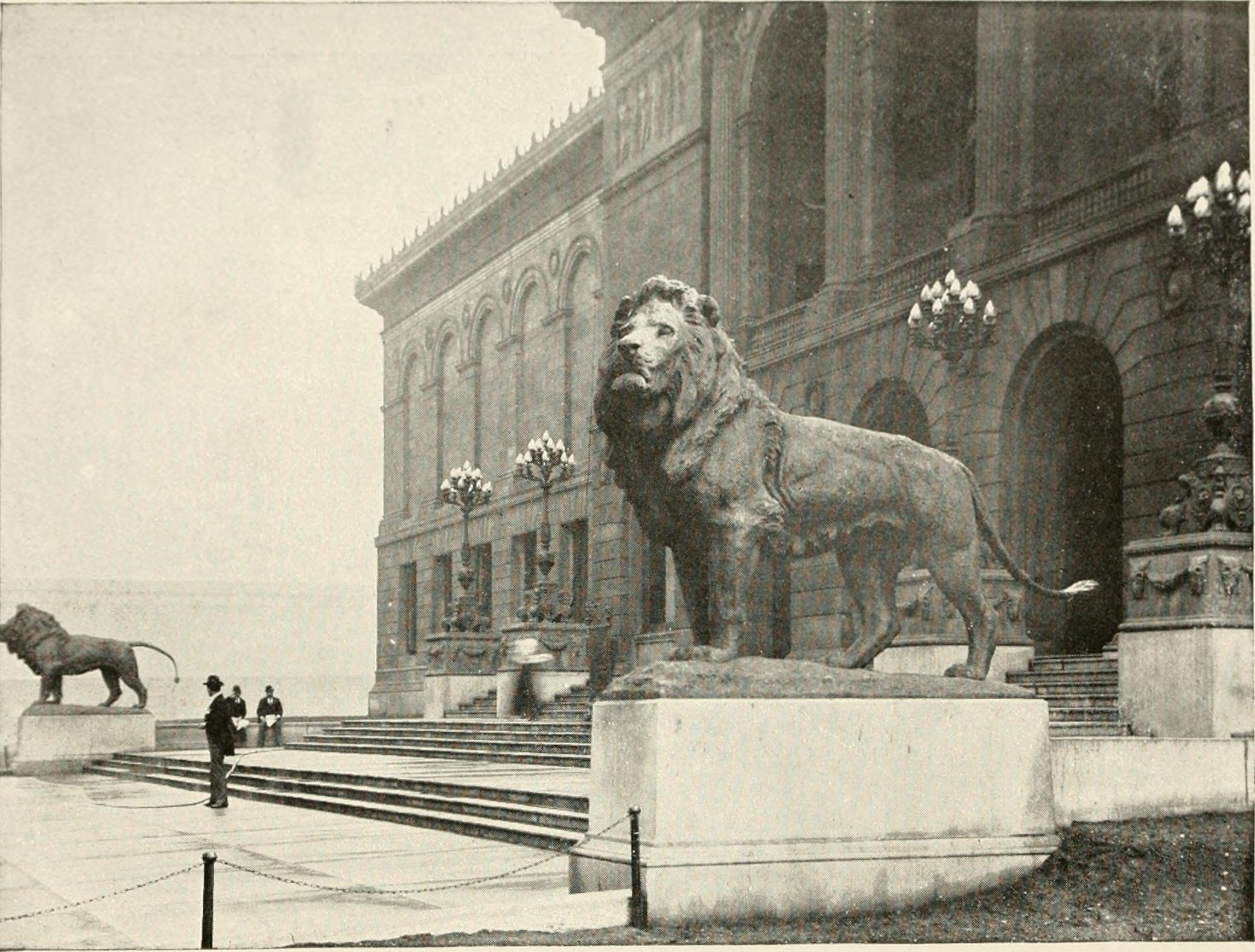
The sculptures c. 1901

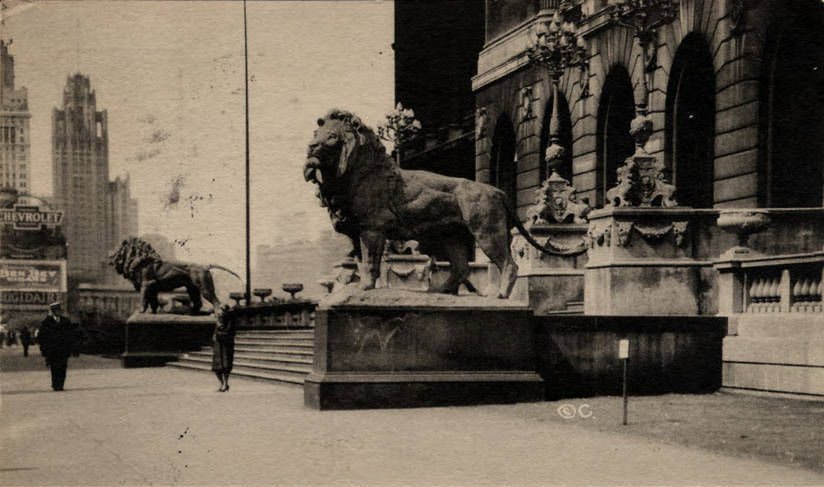
The sculptures in the 1930s

The bronze sculptures for the Art Institute of Chicago were commissioned by Florence Lathrop Field, an early benefactor of the museum. Fields' late husband Henry Field had been an admirer of Kemeys' sculptures, and her brother Bryan Lathrop, a trustee of the Art Institute, had been a patron of Kemeys.

After the board of trustees of the Art Institute of Chicago had made a decision for there to be guardian lion sculptures outside of the new museum building, the president of the board of trustees, Charles L. Hutchinson, favored commissioning such as work from one of a dozen better-known sculptors. Those considered included Augustus Bauer, Daniel Chester French, Frederick William Macmonnies, Philip Martiny, and Augustus Saint-Gaudens. Bryan Lathrop wrote him in September 1892, strongly recommending he choose Kemeys. Lathrop proposed having his sister, Florence Lathrop Field, acquire and gift the Art Institute such sculptures. Lathrop stated that Field had wanted to donate them anonymously. However, in voting to accept the gift on January 31, 1893, the board of trustees executive committee also voted to thank the donor. The sculptures were cast in Chicago by the American Bronze Founding Company in 1893, and were unveiled on May 10, 1894.

In 1910, the sculptures were moved slightly from their original placement to new positions 12 feet (3.7 m) nearer to the museum building. They remained in place until being temporarily removed from early 2000 until 2001, being removed in order to accommodate repair work to the entrance of the building. During this time, the sculptures underwent conservation work. They were removed a second time in 2022 to again undergo conservation work (cleaning and waxing). A time capsule was placed after the 2001 conservation work, accompanying a much older time capsule that is also concealed by the sculptures. During the 2022 conservation work, the time capsules were temporarily removed, being returned unopened when the sculptures were reinstalled. Furthermore, the south sculpture was found to have two Indian Head cent coins underneath it, which were temporarily removed and returned to their place underneath the sculpture when it was reinstalled.

The sculptures are regarded to be iconic features of Chicago, being among the city's most well-known sculptures. The Chicago Lions rugby union team, founded in 1964, is named for the statues. An unofficial Twitter account exists for the sculptures. In 2024, the Chicago Sky of the WNBA unveiled their new mascot: "Skye the Lioness", an animal choice which was inspired by the sculptures. This replaced the team’s previous mascot, "Sky Guy".

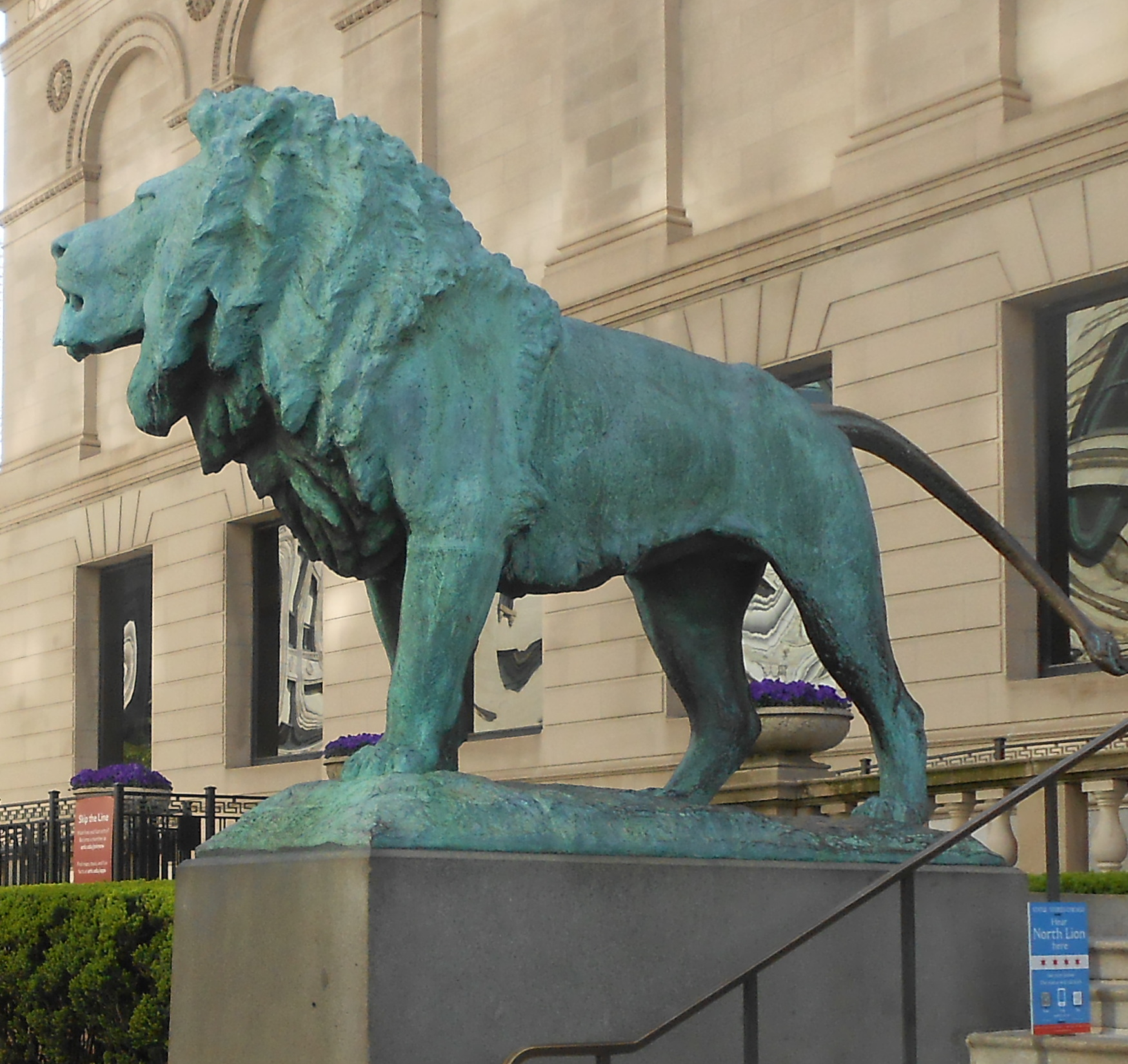
North sculpture in 2016, with a QR code installed below it (lower right) as part of the Statue Stories Chicago public art exhibit

In 2015, as part of the Statue Stories Chicago public art exhibit, QR codes were installed near each of the statues. If scanned, the codes would allow the lions to "speak", with one of them being voiced by Tracy Letts and the other by Francis Guinan. Tina Landau of the Steppenwolf Theatre Company wrote a script in which the two sculptures were portrayed as "gently feuding brothers". In 2018, as part of another Statue Stories of Chicago installation, the sculptures were voiced by Letts and Mandy Patinkin.

In 2020, the base of the northern sculpture was vandalized, with the words "inside mania" spray painted beneath the statute. A woman was criminally charged for the vandalism. In July 2021, the northern sculpture itself was vandalized with spray painted tagging.

== Special decorations ==
Christmas and holiday season wreaths on sculptures

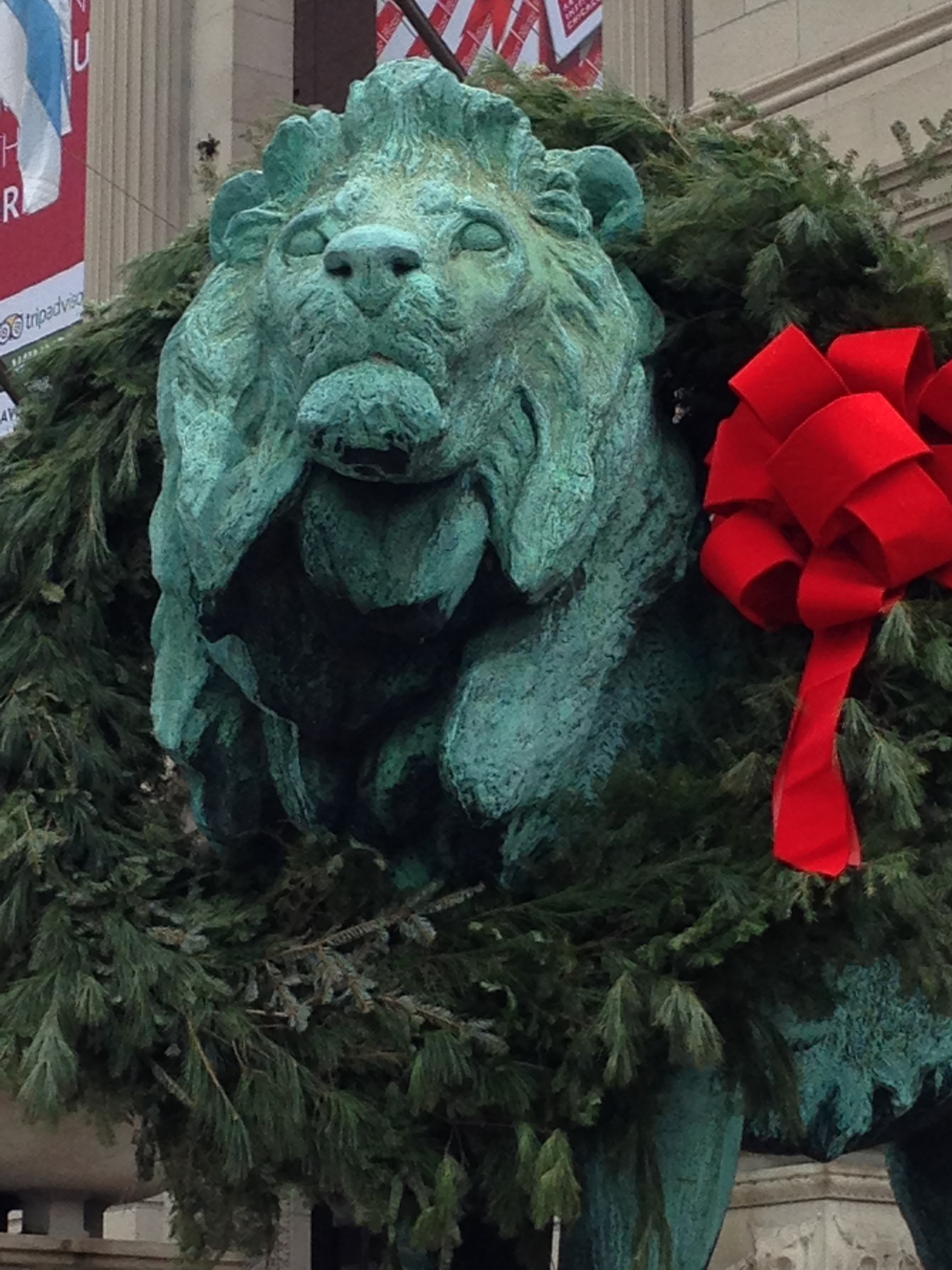
The southern sculpture with a wreath in 2014

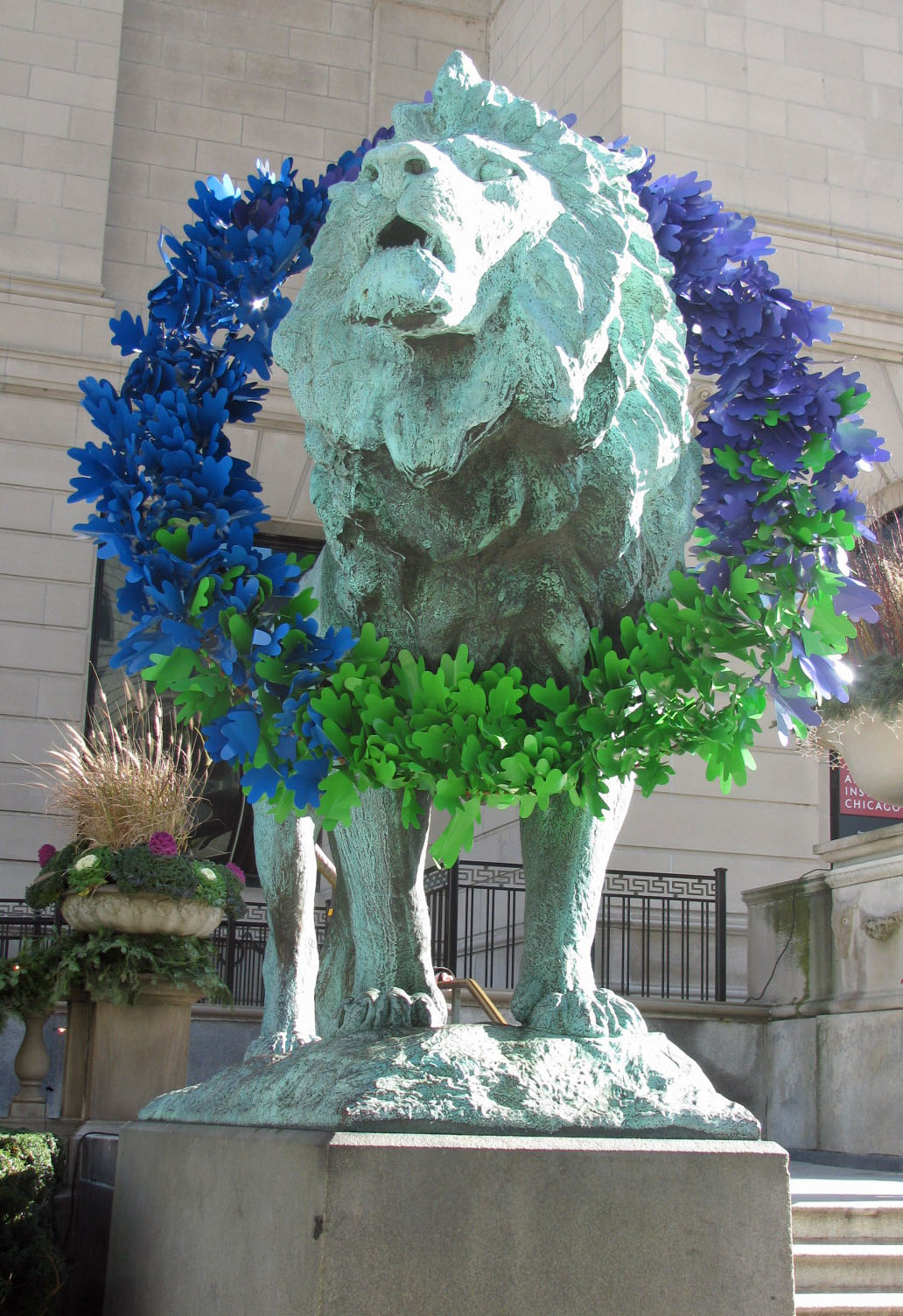
North sculpture with a wreath in 2009

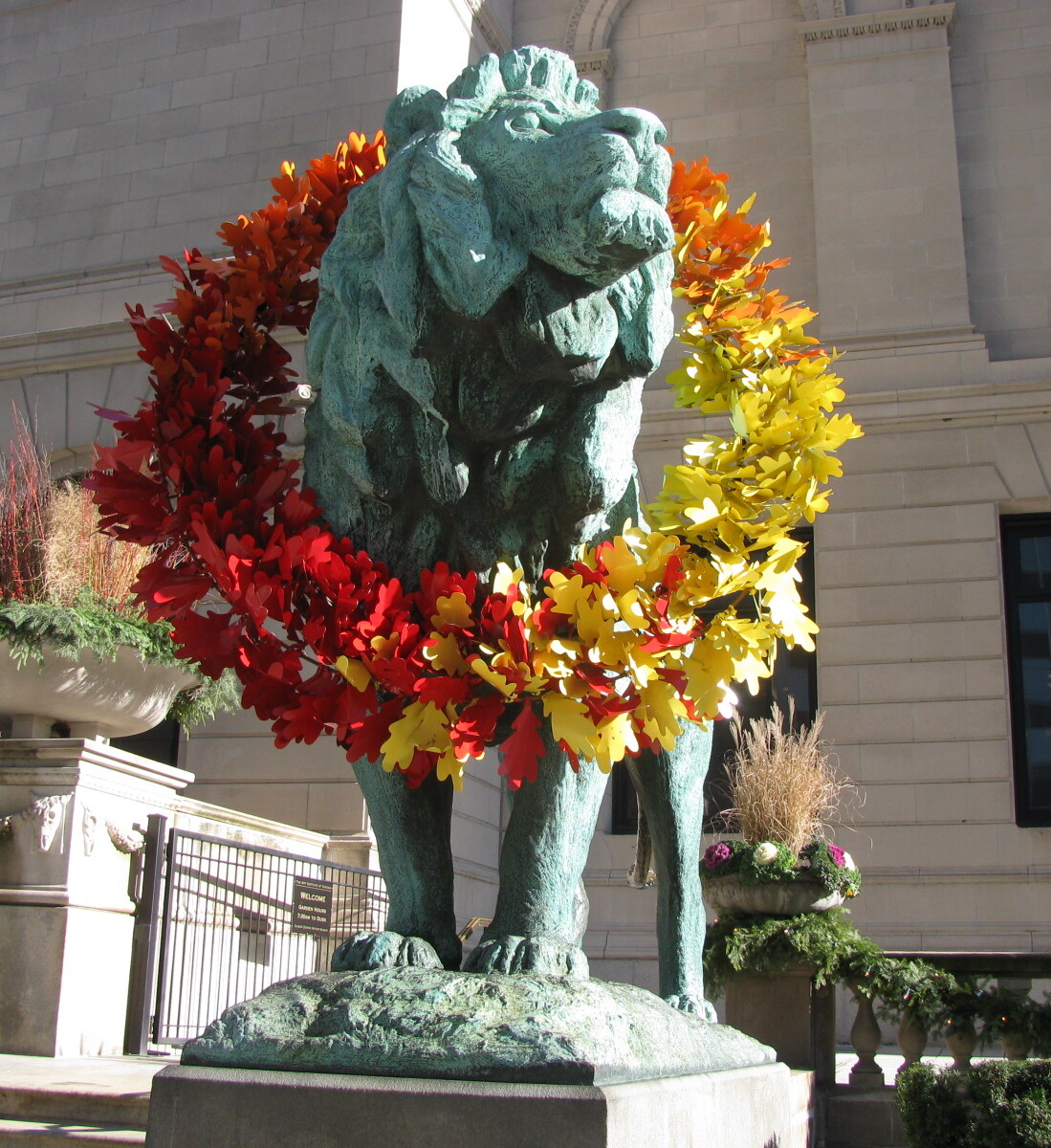
South sculpture with a wreath in 2009

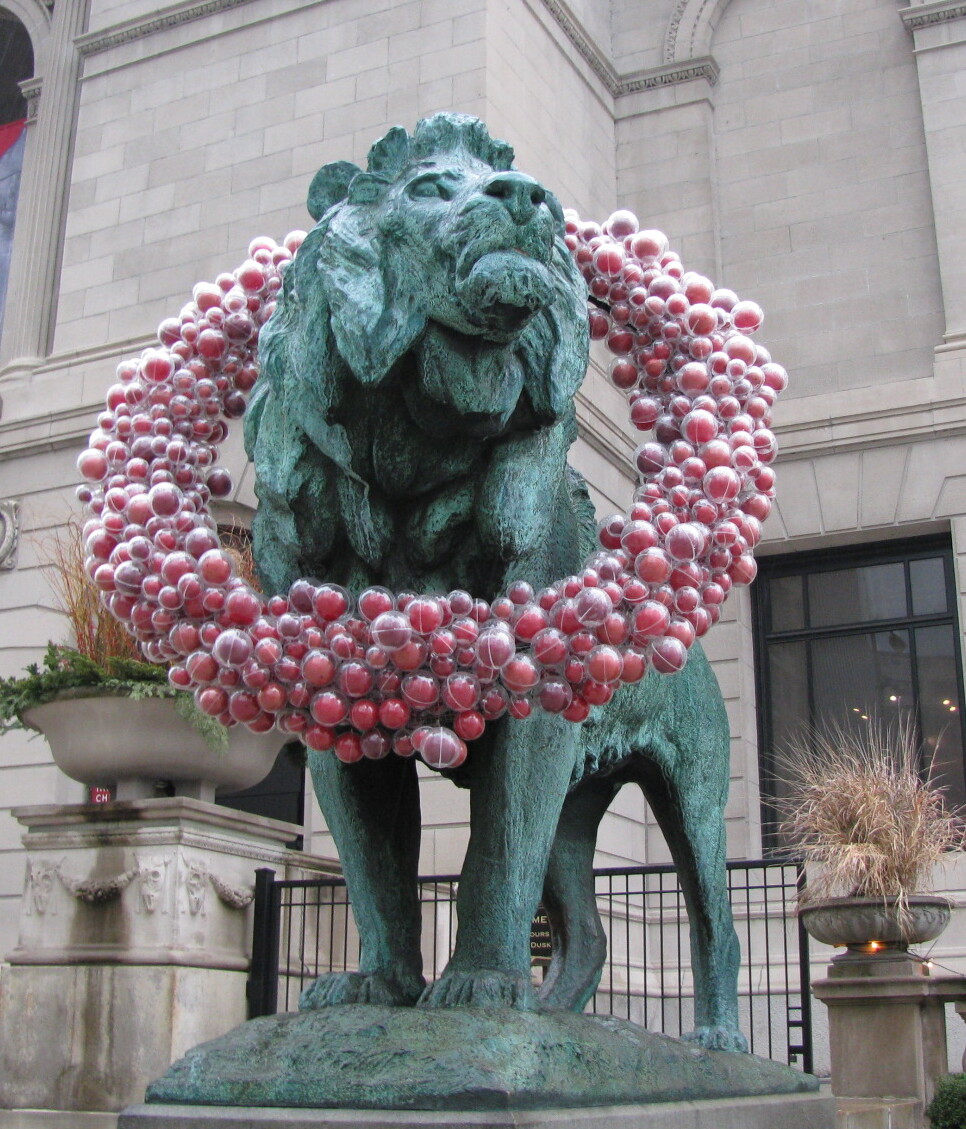
South sculpture with a wreath in 2010

Sports team decorations

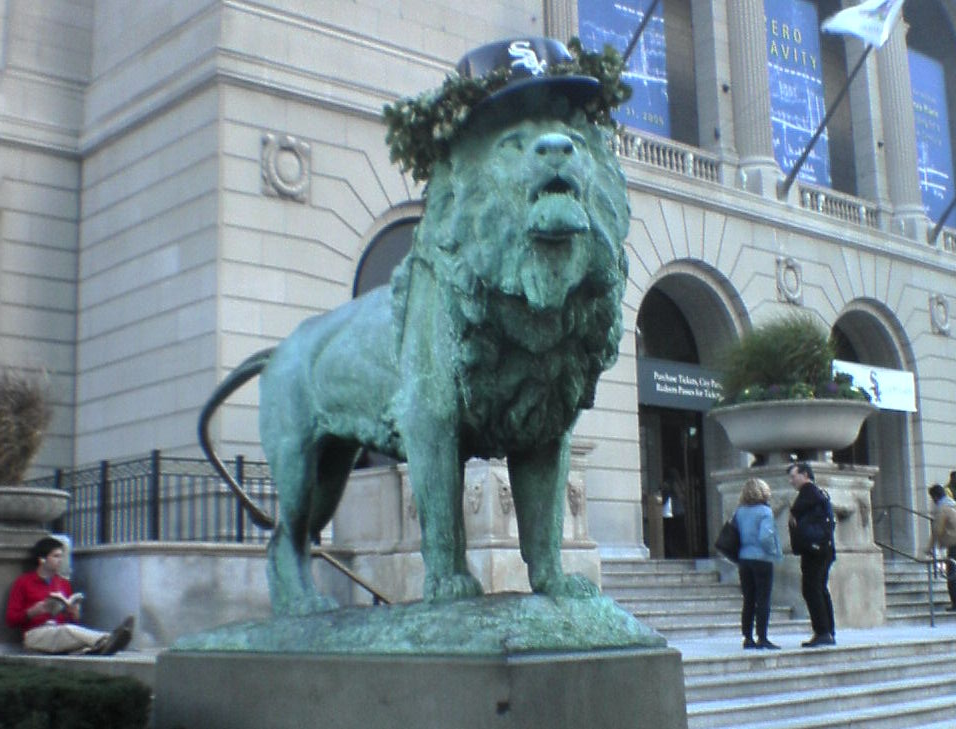
The northern sculpture decorated to support the Chicago White Sox in the 2005 World Series

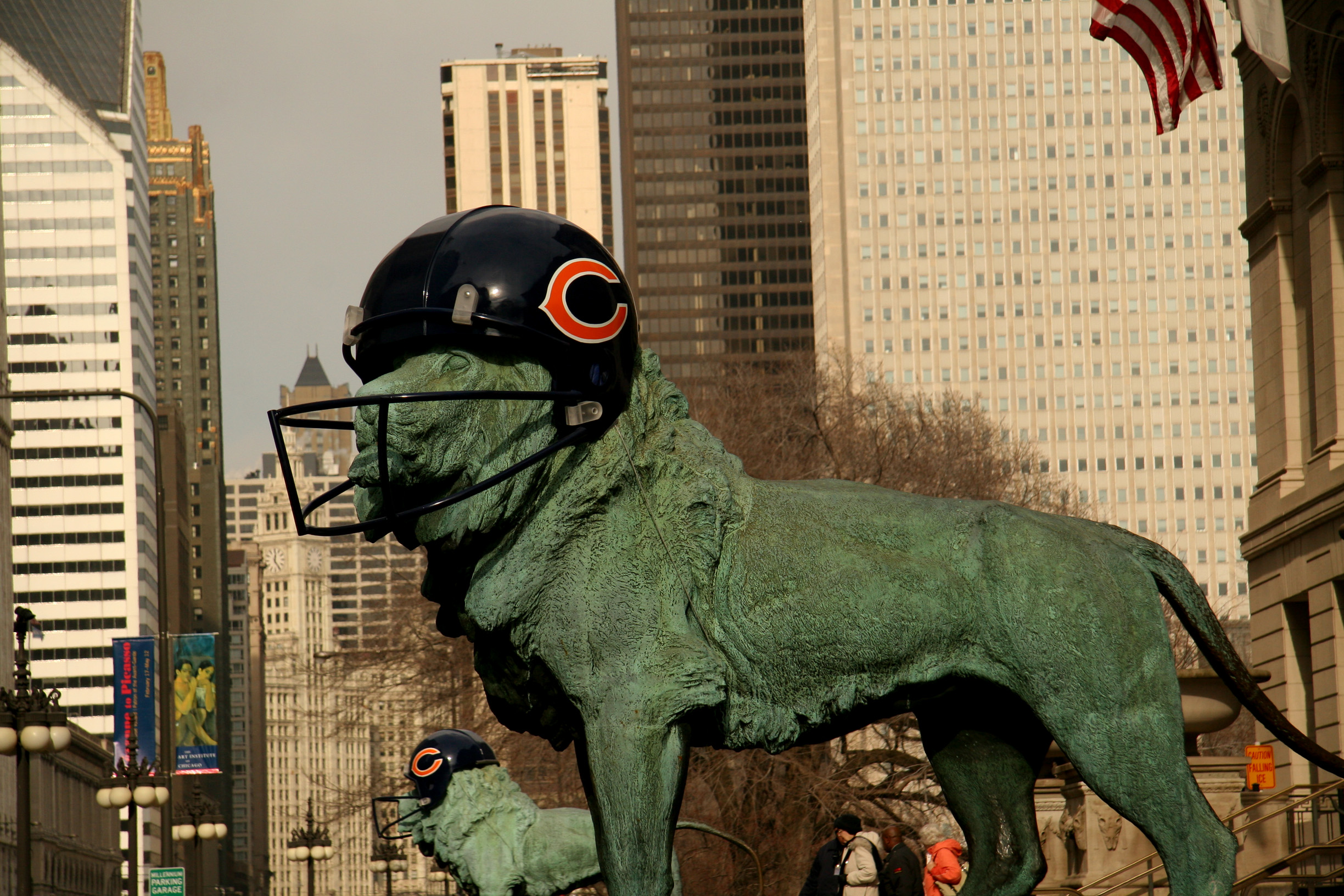
The sculptures decorated to support the Chicago Bears for Super Bowl XLI (2007)

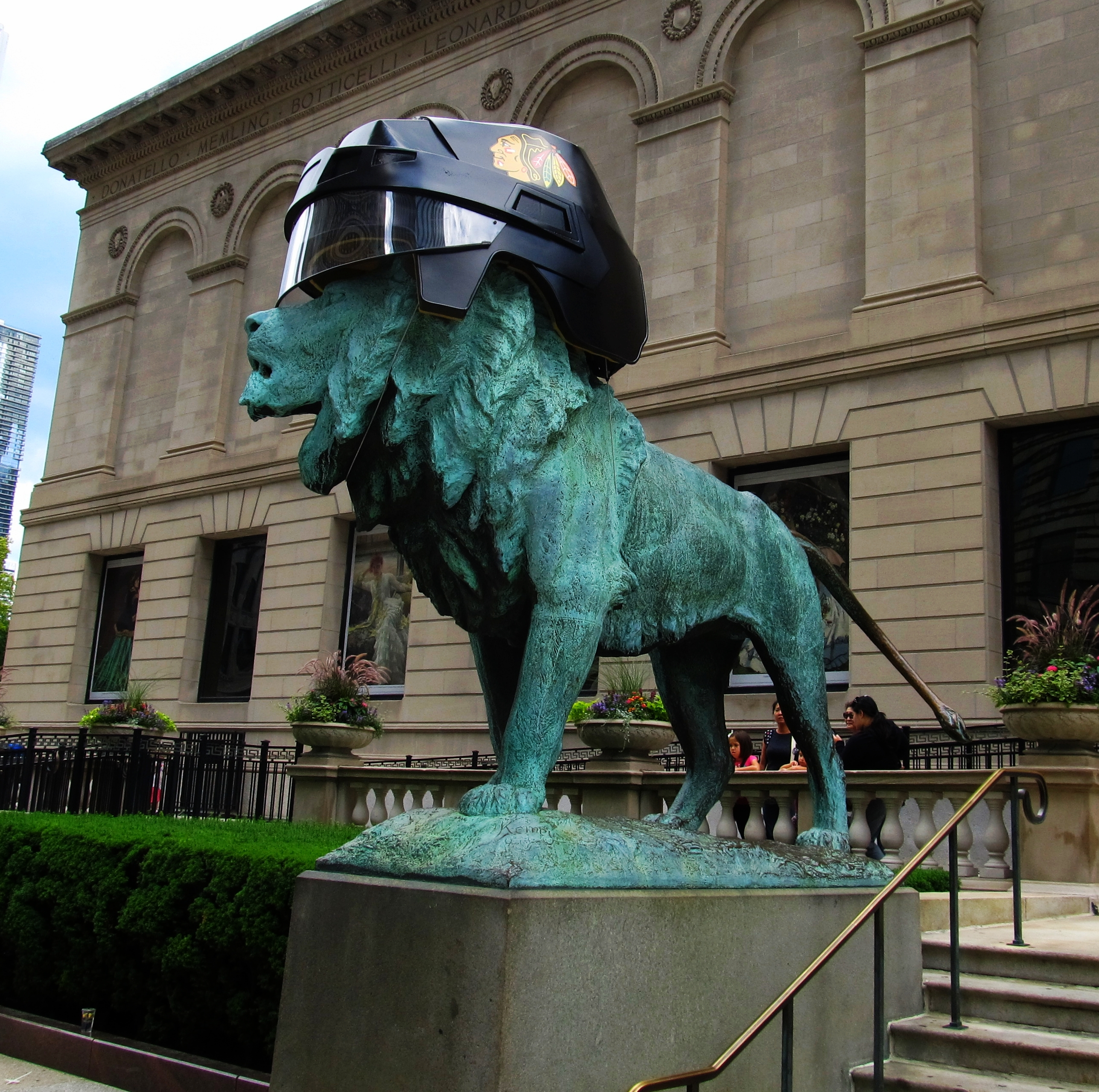
The northern sculpture decorated to support the Chicago Blackhawks during the 2013 Stanley Cup Final

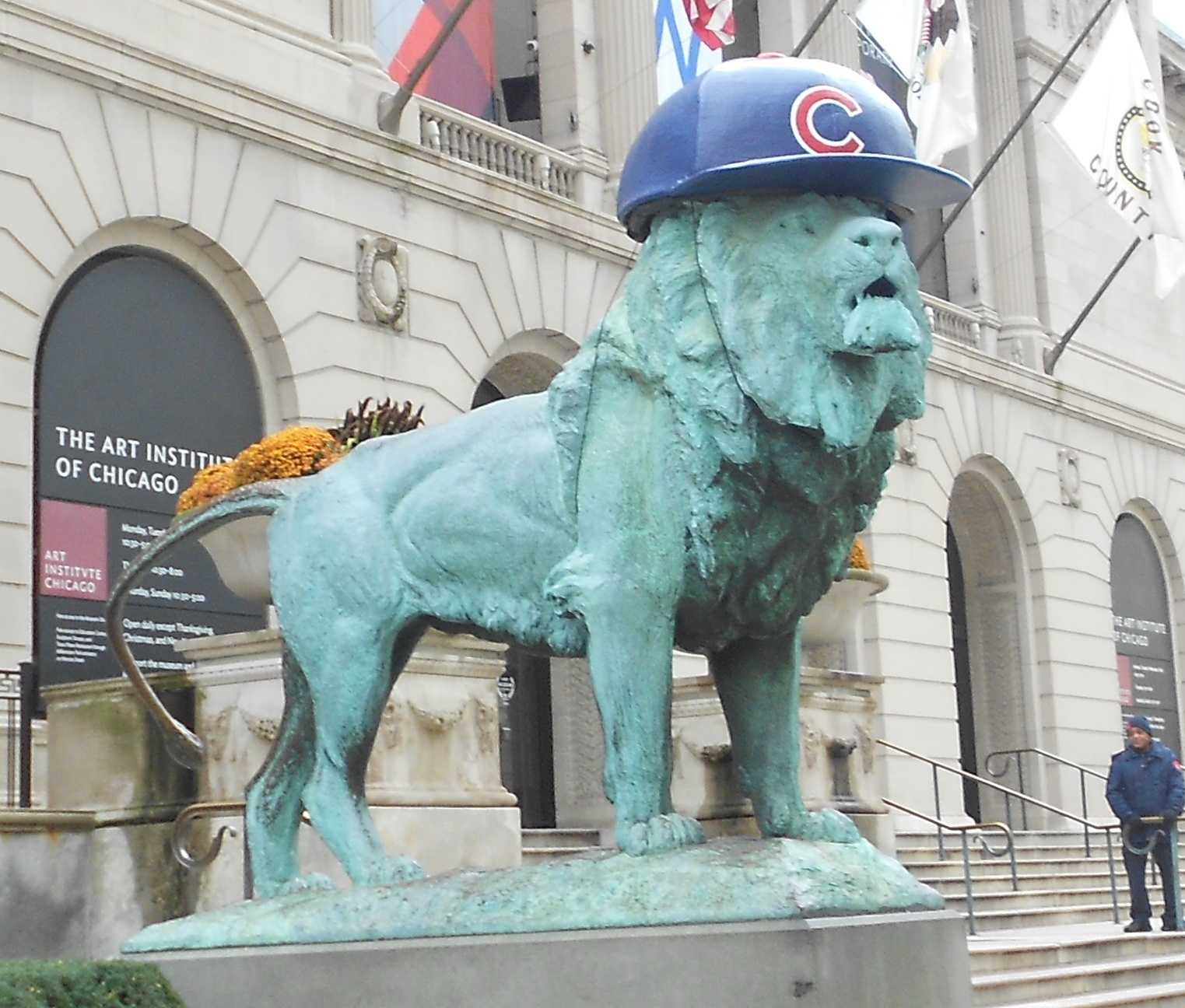
The northern sculpture decorated to support the Chicago Cubs during the 2016 World Series

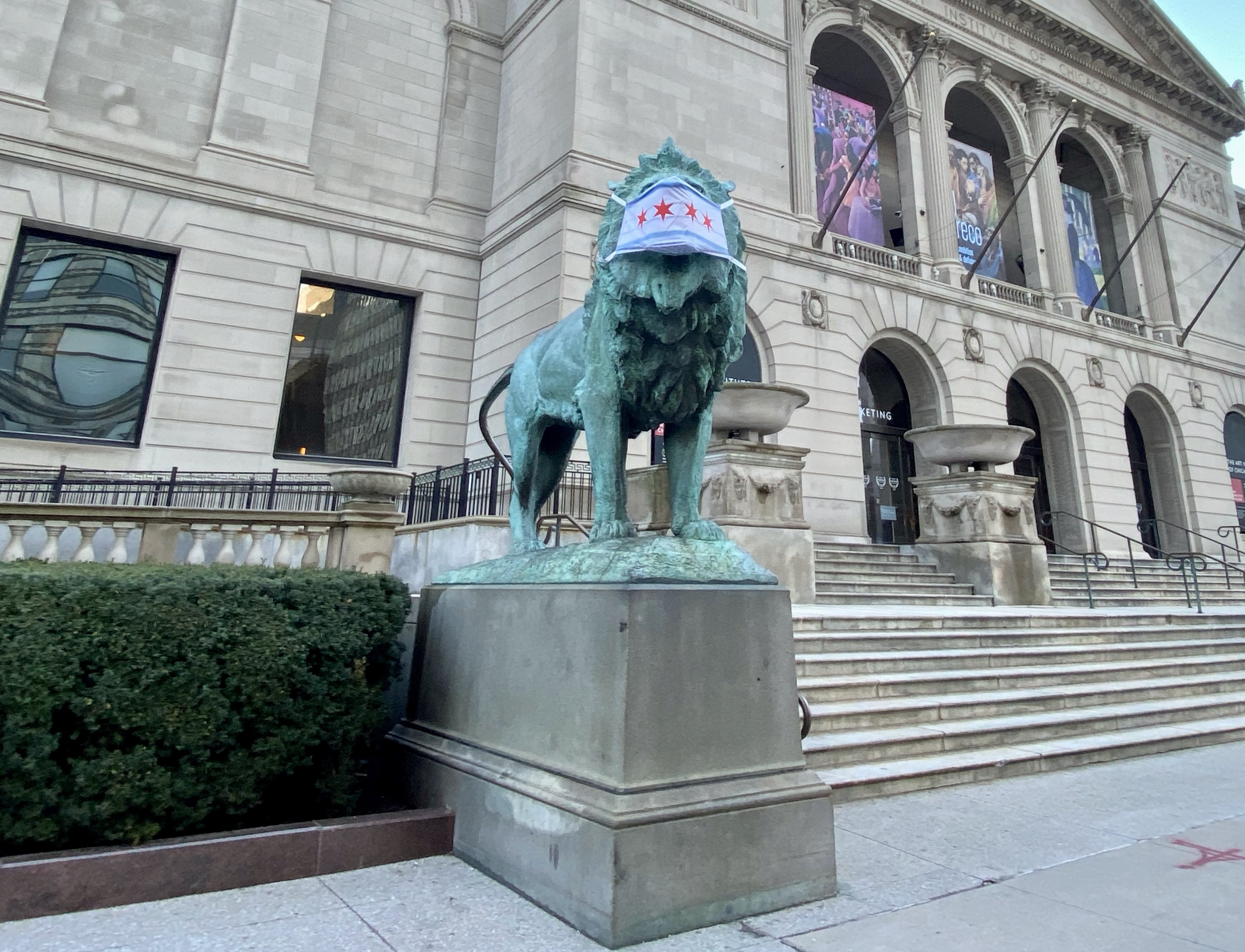
The northern sculpture adorned with an oversized mock-up of a surgical mask in April 2020 (during the COVID-19 pandemic)

The sculptures are, nowadays, decorated in the winter holiday season with wreaths and bows in an annual "wreathing of the lions" ceremony. This tradition was begun in 1991 and has been done nearly every year since. The wreathing ceremony is traditionally held the day following the United States Thanksgiving holiday observance.

Often, when a Chicago major league sports team is making a strong postseason run, the sculptures will be adorned with oversized mock-ups of hats or helmets in order to show support for the team. The first instance of this came in 1985, when the statutes were decorated with mockups of football helmets to celebrate the Chicago Bears appearance in Super Bowl XX. The sculptures were decorated with helmets again in 2007 when the Bears appeared in Super Bowl XLI, as well as in 2011 when the Bears appeared in the NFC Championship Game. The sculptures were decorated for the Chicago Blackhawks during their Stanley Cup Final appearances in 2010, 2013, and 2015. During the 2021 WNBA Finals, the sculptures were decorated for the Chicago Sky for the first time (having previously not been decorated for the team's' earlier appearance 2014 WNBA Finals). The sculptures were decorated for the Chicago White Sox's appearance in the 2005 World Series, and the Chicago Cubs' appearance in the 2016 World Series. Additionally (unrelated to any postseason appearance), the statues had previously been decorated with Cubs hats (created by Carol Terry of the Ryerson Library) for a special "Lion Cubs" event held at the museum entrance in early October 1984.

In late April 2020 (amid the COVID-19 pandemic), mock-ups of a surgical mask were placed on the sculptures in order to bring public attention to health safety measures implemented in Illinois at the time that required masking in public. A mock-up of a mask was similarly placed on the Chicago Picasso. Within a day vandals had removed one of the masks on the lion sculptures, which was quickly replaced.

== See also ==
- 1893 in art
- 1894 in art
- Cultural depictions of lions
