= Bryan Lathrop House =

Historic house in Illinois, United States

- U.S. National Register of Historic Places
- Chicago Landmark
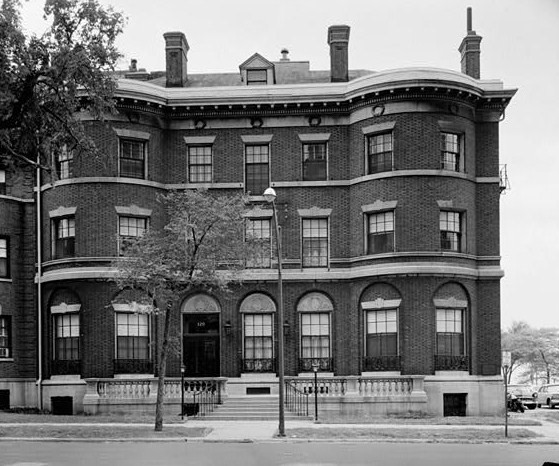

- Location within Chicago metropolitan area Location within Illinois Location within the United States
- Location: 120 E. Bellevue Pl., Chicago, Illinois
- Coordinates: 41°54′6″N 87°37′31″W
- Built: 1892
- Architect: McKim, Mead & White; McKim, Charles Follen
- Architectural style: Georgian
- NRHP reference No.: 74000753

Significant dates
- Added to NRHP: February 15, 1974
- Designated CHICL: May 9, 1973

The Bryan Lathrop House is a Georgian style house at 120 E Bellevue Place in the Gold Coast neighborhood of Chicago, Illinois, United States. The house was built in 1892 by McKim, Mead & White for Bryan Lathrop. In 1922 the house was sold to the Fortnightly Club. The club still occupies the building. It was designated a Chicago Landmark on May 9, 1973, and it was listed on the National Register of Historic Places in 1974.
