= Sextus Barbour =

American physician

- Born: Sextus Barbour; July 26, 1813; Orange County, Virginia
- Died: December 20, 1848 (aged 35); St. Louis, Missouri
- Education: University of Pennsylvania
- Occupations: medical doctor, planter
- Political party: Democratic Party
- Parent(s): Philip P. Barbour; Frances Todd Johnson
- Relatives: Barbour family

Dr. Sextus Barbour (July 26, 1813 – December 20, 1848) was an American medical doctor and planter. He was a son of Philip P. Barbour, making him a scion of the Barbour political family.

== Early life and education ==
Barbour was born on July 26, 1813, in Orange County, Virginia. He was the sixth child of Philip P. Barbour and his wife Frances Todd Johnson.

Barbour began his studies at the University of Pennsylvania School of Medicine in 1834.

== Writings ==
Sometime between 1839 and 1843, Barbour wrote "Directions for Writing" which is widely cited in literature on writing and grammar:

In notes in the third person, the address, and date, are to be placed, on the right side just below the last line. Both letters, and notes, are to be addressed, to the persons for whom they are intended, on the left side, of the lower part of the paper. The place of abode of the person to whom sent, to be first. This is the case when they are in the third person. The letter, or note should never be carried so, near the bottom, as not to have room for the usual conclusion, and signature or to crunch it. Postscripts should if possible be avoided, and, on no account should civilities be postponed to this part. All letters should be enveloped but such as are sent by the post. Nothing should be written when [?] the inside of the envelope; not must any address, be put on the enclosed letter. A half sheet to be used for the envelope.

A hiring agreement in 1846 between Barbour and his eldest brother Edmund Pendleton Barbour serves as a historically significant source for the safety of, hiring of, and caring for slaves. The agreement did not list a price for a slave's services but included the standard food and clothing clause along with an additional clause stating that "the boy Edwin not be allowed to cross the Libertyville millpond or the watercourse when it is high."

== Death ==
Both Barbour and his brother Thomas Barbour, also a physician, died of cholera during the 1848–49 St. Louis cholera epidemic. The epidemic killed 4,500 people, one-tenth of the population of St. Louis. Barbour died on December 20, 1848, and his brother Thomas died the following year in June 1849.
