= Adolf Schreyer =

German painter

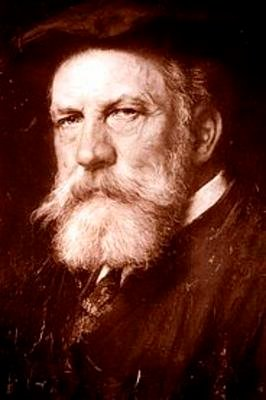
- Portrait of Schreyer by an unknown artist
- Born: July 9, 1828; Frankfurt-am-Main
- Died: July 29, 1899 (aged 71); Kronberg im Taunus
- Education: Städel Institute, Stuttgart and Munich
- Known for: Painter

Adolf Schreyer (9 July 1828 – 29 July 1899) was a German painter, associated with the Düsseldorf school of painting.

== Biography ==
He was born in Frankfurt-am-Main. He studied art first at the Städel Institute in his native town, and then at Stuttgart and Munich. He painted many of his favourite subjects in his travels in the East. He first accompanied Maximilian Karl, 6th Prince of Thurn and Taxis through Hungary, Wallachia, Russia and Turkey; then, in 1854, he followed the Austrian army across the Wallachian frontier. In 1856 he went to Egypt and Syria, and in 1861 to Algiers. In 1862 he settled in Paris, but returned to Germany in 1870; and settled at Kronberg im Taunus near Frankfurt, where he died.

== Work ==
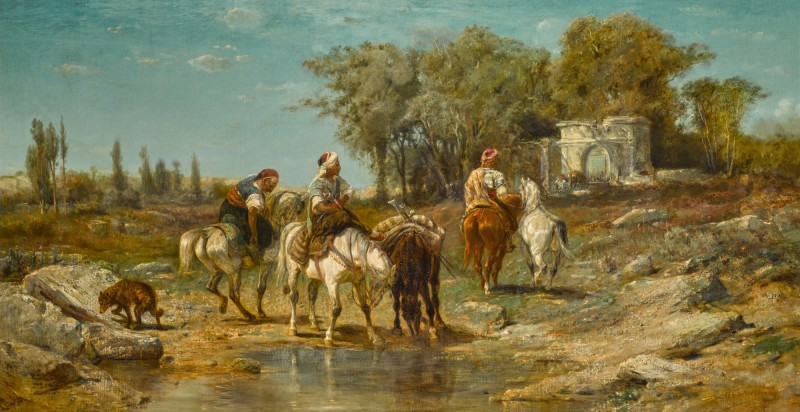
Horsemen at a Watering Place

Schreyer was, and is still, especially esteemed as a painter of horses, of peasant life in Wallachia and Moldavia, and of battle incidents. His work is remarkable for its excellent equine draughtsmanship, and for the artist's power of observation and forceful statement; and has found particular favour among French and American collectors. His collectors included the Rockefeller family, Vanderbilt family, John Jacob Astor, William Backhouse Astor, Sr., August Belmont, and William Walters collections. Of his battle-pictures there are two at the Schwerin Gallery, and others in the collection of Count Mensdorff-Pouilly and in the Raven Gallery, Berlin. His painting of a Charge of Artillery of Imperial Guard was formerly at the Luxembourg Museum. The Metropolitan Museum, New York owns three of Schreyer's orientalist paintings: Abandoned, Arabs on the March and Arabs making a detour. At the Kunsthalle Hamburg is his Wallachian Transport Train, and at the Staedel Institute, Frankfort, are two of his Wallachian scenes.
