= Barbour Lathrop =

American philanthropist (1847–1927)

Thomas Barbour Lathrop
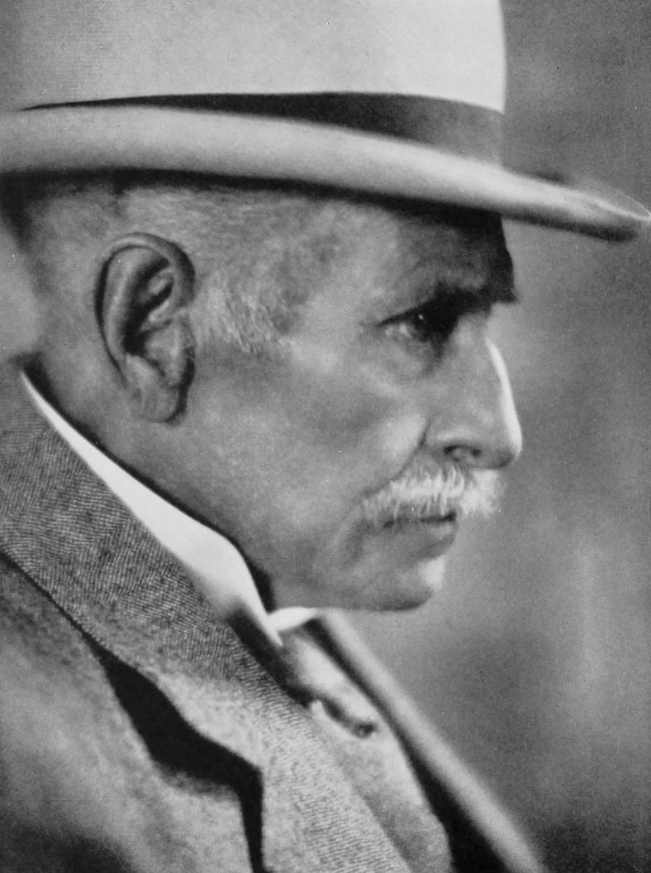
- Born: January 28, 1847; Alexandria, Virginia, U.S.
- Died: May 17, 1927; Philadelphia, Pennsylvania, U.S.
- Education: Harvard Law School
- Occupation: Philanthropist
- Parent(s): Jedediah Hyde Lathrop; Mariana Bryan

Thomas Barbour Lathrop (January 28, 1847 – May 17, 1927) was an American philanthropist and world traveler.

== Early life ==
He was born in Alexandria, Virginia to Jedediah Hyde Lathrop, a descendant of the Lathrop family of New Hampshire and Mariana Bryan of Virginia. His older brother was Bryan Lathrop and younger sister was Florence Lathrop. At the outbreak of the American Civil War, Lathrop's father, an abolitionist, moved the family to Chicago. Lathrop spent two years at a New York City boarding school before being sent to Germany to attend the University of Bonn. Upon his return, he attended Harvard Law School, graduating in 1869. Lathrop was a member of the Barbour family on his mother's side.

== Career ==
Lathrop rebelled against his father's insistence that he practice law and was cut off from any further financial assistance. He moved to San Francisco in the early 1870s and worked as a reporter for The San Francisco Morning Call. Shortly after its founding in 1879, Lathrop became one of the earliest members of the Bohemian Club where he was well known for his conversational brilliance and keen wit. Lathrop considered the Bohemian Club in San Francisco his home for the rest of his life.

Lathrop's father died in 1887 and left him an equal share in the family fortune. Almost overnight, he became a very wealthy man. He left his job as a reporter and became a philanthropist and world traveler. Lathrop traveled around the world many times. In 1893, on a steamship to Naples, Italy, Lathrop met a young biologist named David Fairchild, whom he persuaded to become a plant explorer. He financed Fairchild and accompanied him on his early travels in search of plants for introduction into the United States. Lathrop's travels with Fairchild are described in detail in Fairchild's autobiography and Stoneman Douglas' book Adventures in a Green World. For his contributions to American horticulture and botany, he was awarded the Frank N. Meyer Memorial Medal in 1920. He was the first recipient of the Meyer Medal which is given in recognition of outstanding services to U.S. plant introduction. The Barbour Lathrop Trail at Barro Colorado Island in Panama is named for him in recognition of his early support of the tropical research station.

=== Later life ===
When he became too old to travel, Lathrop spent the winters with the Fairchild Family in Coconut Grove, Florida. Lathrop died on May 17, 1927, in Philadelphia, where he had stopped to stay at The Bellevue-Stratford Hotel on his annual trip to San Francisco.
