= Bryan Lathrop =

American businessman (1844–1916)

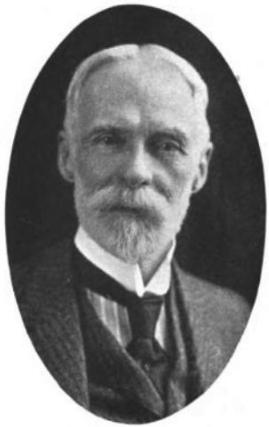
- Born: August 6, 1844; Alexandria, Virginia
- Died: May 13, 1916 (aged 71); Chicago, Illinois
- Burial place: Graceland Cemetery
- Occupation: Businessman
- Spouse: Lynde Aldis (m. 1875)
- Parent(s): Jedediah Hyde Lathrop; Mariana Bryan

Signature
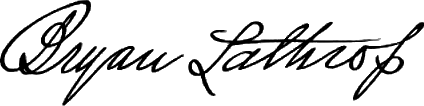

Bryan Lathrop (August 6, 1844 – May 13, 1916) was an American businessman and art collector from Alexandria, Virginia, United States. He is known for his works in Chicago, Illinois, where his insurance and real estate dealings made him very wealthy. Lathrop had a lifelong interest in the arts, supporting several Chicago institutions and rallying for an extension to Lincoln Park. He was also the longtime president of the Chicago Symphony Orchestra and Graceland Cemetery. He was the brother-in-law of Marshall Field and Thomas Nelson Page.

== Early life ==
Bryan Lathrop was born on August 6, 1844, to Jedediah Hyde Lathrop and Mariana Lathrop in Alexandria, Virginia.

His family was prominent in the state; he descended from John Lothropp and was the grand-nephew of Governor James Barbour. He was grandson of Daniel Bryan

Lathrop attended the Dinwiddie School, intending to enroll at the University of Virginia. However, with the outbreak of the American Civil War, Lathrop moved with his pro-Union family to Chicago, Illinois, home of his uncle, Thomas Barbour Bryan. Lathrop's parents sent him to study in Europe under private tutelage during the war. Here, Lathrop gained an appreciation of art and culture. Lathrop returned to Chicago in 1865.

== Career ==
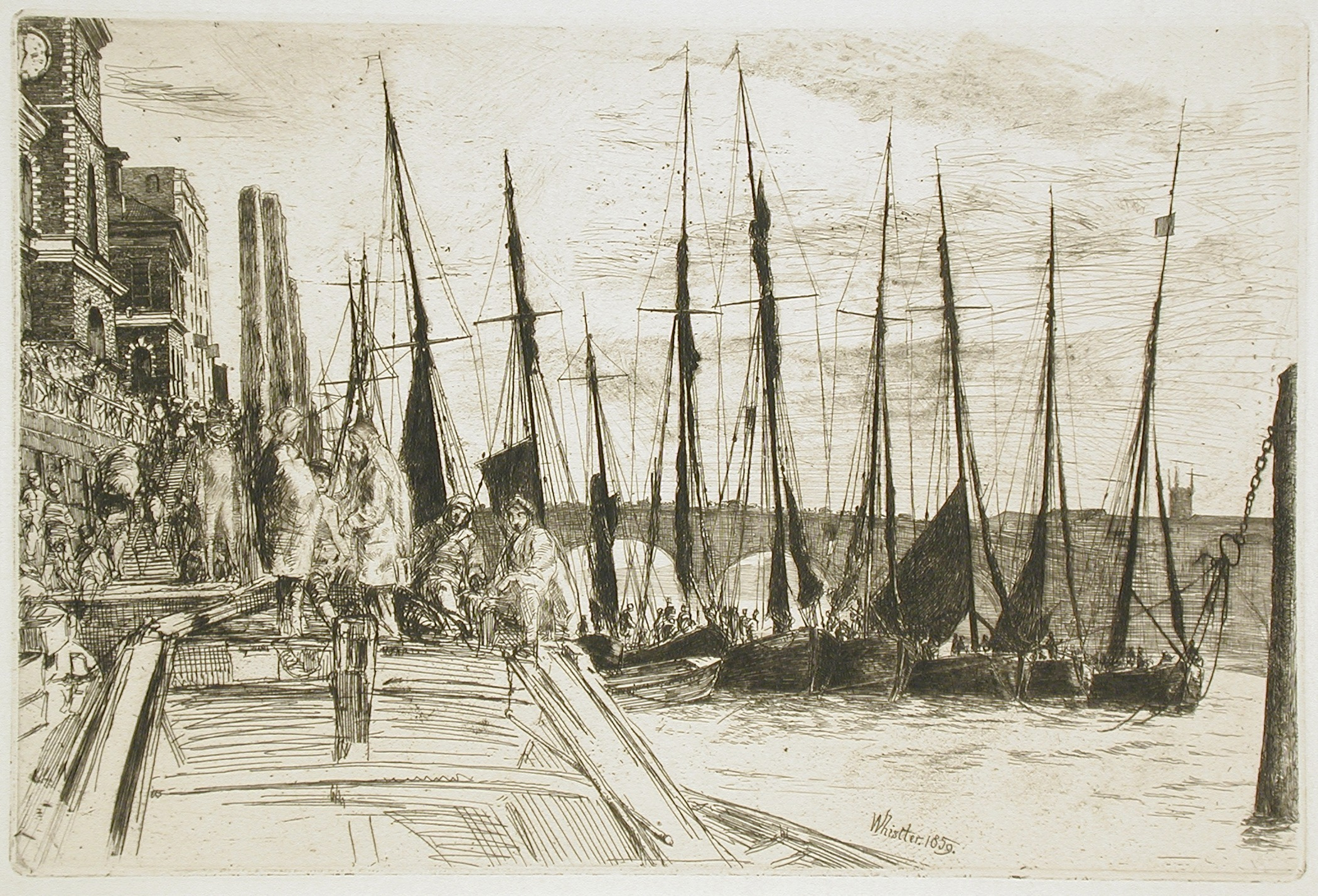
Billingsgate, one of the James Abbott McNeill Whistler drawings collected by Lathrop and bequeathed to the Art Institute of Chicago

Lathrop engaged in a variety of pursuits once back in Chicago, dealing in real estate and life insurance. He quickly rose to prominence and became an advocate for parks in Chicago. Lathrop led an effort to extend Lincoln Park along the shore of Lake Michigan. His uncle Thomas named him the president of Graceland Cemetery in 1878. Lathrop held this position until his death. He also co-founded the Chicago Real Estate Board and became president of the Elmhurst Spring Water Company. He was a trustee of the Newberry Library and Art Institute of Chicago from 1894 until his death. He was also a trustee of the Chicago Symphony Orchestra from 1894 until 1898, when he was named its vice president. Five years later, he was named its president and served in this role until his death. Under his presidency, the orchestra moved into its current home in Orchestra Hall.

== Personal life ==
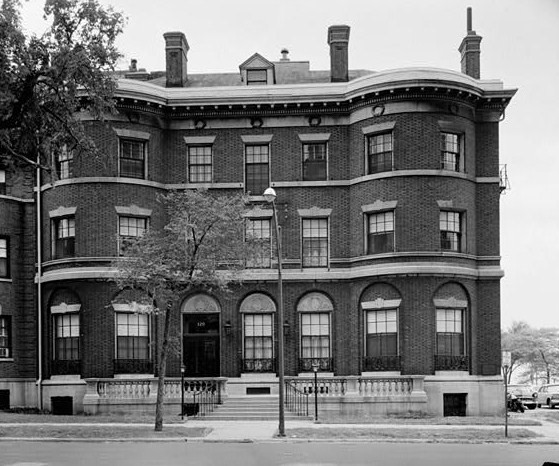
Bellevue Place, Lathrop's house designed by Charles Follen McKim

Lathrop's sister was Florence Lathrop, who first married Henry, brother of Marshall Field, and then, after being widowed, married Thomas Nelson Page. Lathrop married Lynde Aldis, the daughter of a Chicago judge, in 1875. His younger brother was Barbour Lathrop, world traveler and patron of plant explorer David Grandison Fairchild. In 1892, Lathrop commissioned Charles Follen McKim of McKim, Mead & White to design his house, Bellevue Place, in Chicago. Lathrop was also an avid collector of art and had one of the largest collections of James Abbott McNeill Whistler in the country. Lathrop was a member of the Caxton Club, Grolier Club, and Chicago Historical Society.

Lathrop died at his home in Chicago on May 13, 1916, and donated most of his property to his philanthropic endeavors, including $700,000 to the Chicago Symphony Orchestra. He was buried in Graceland Cemetery. Edgar Lee Masters wrote a commemorative poem about Lathrop in Poetry magazine in honor of his support of music in Chicago. The orchestra established the Bryan Lathrop Memorial scholarship fund in his memory, thanks in part to a $50,000 donation from Florence. Lathrop donated his Whistler collection to the Art Institute.
