= Thomas Barbour (Virginia politician) =

American statesman and landowner (1735–1825)

Justice of the Peace of Orange County
- In office 1768 – May 16, 1825

Member of the Virginia House of Burgesses
- In office May 8, 1769 – May 6, 1776 Serving with James Walker; Zachariah Burnley
- Preceded by: Zachariah Burnley
- Succeeded by: James Taylor
- Constituency: Orange County

Personal details
- Born: Thomas Barbour; 1735 Orange County, Colony of Virginia
- Died: May 16, 1825 (aged 89–90) Barboursville, Barboursville, Virginia
- Citizenship: Kingdom of Great Britain; United States of America
- Party: Whig
- Spouse: Mary Pendleton Thomas (m. 1771)
- Children: 15, including James and Philip
- Occupation: Planter; landowner; statesman

Thomas Barbour (1735 – May 16, 1825) was a prominent landowner and member of the Virginia House of Burgesses.

Thomas Barbour was born in 1735 in Orange County, Colony of Virginia, the son of James Barbour (1707-1775). His elder brother James Barbour represented Culpeper County, Virginia in the House of Burgesses from 1761 to 1765. Barbour married Mary Pendleton Thomas, a first cousin of Edmund Pendleton, in 1771. They had ten daughters and five sons. Their sons who likewise held offices included James Barbour (18th Governor of Virginia and 11th United States Secretary of War) and Philip P. Barbour (U.S. Congressman from Virginia and an associate justice of the United States Supreme Court).

Barbour served as Justice of the Peace for Orange County, from 1768 until his death. From 1769 until 1776 (although the prorogued house had no quorum after June 24, 1775), Barbour represented Orange County in the Virginia House of Burgesses. He was a Whig. Thomas died at his son James Barbour's plantation, Barboursville on May 16, 1825.
