= 1905 Chicago mayoral election =

- April 4, 1905
- Turnout: 81% ▼3 pp
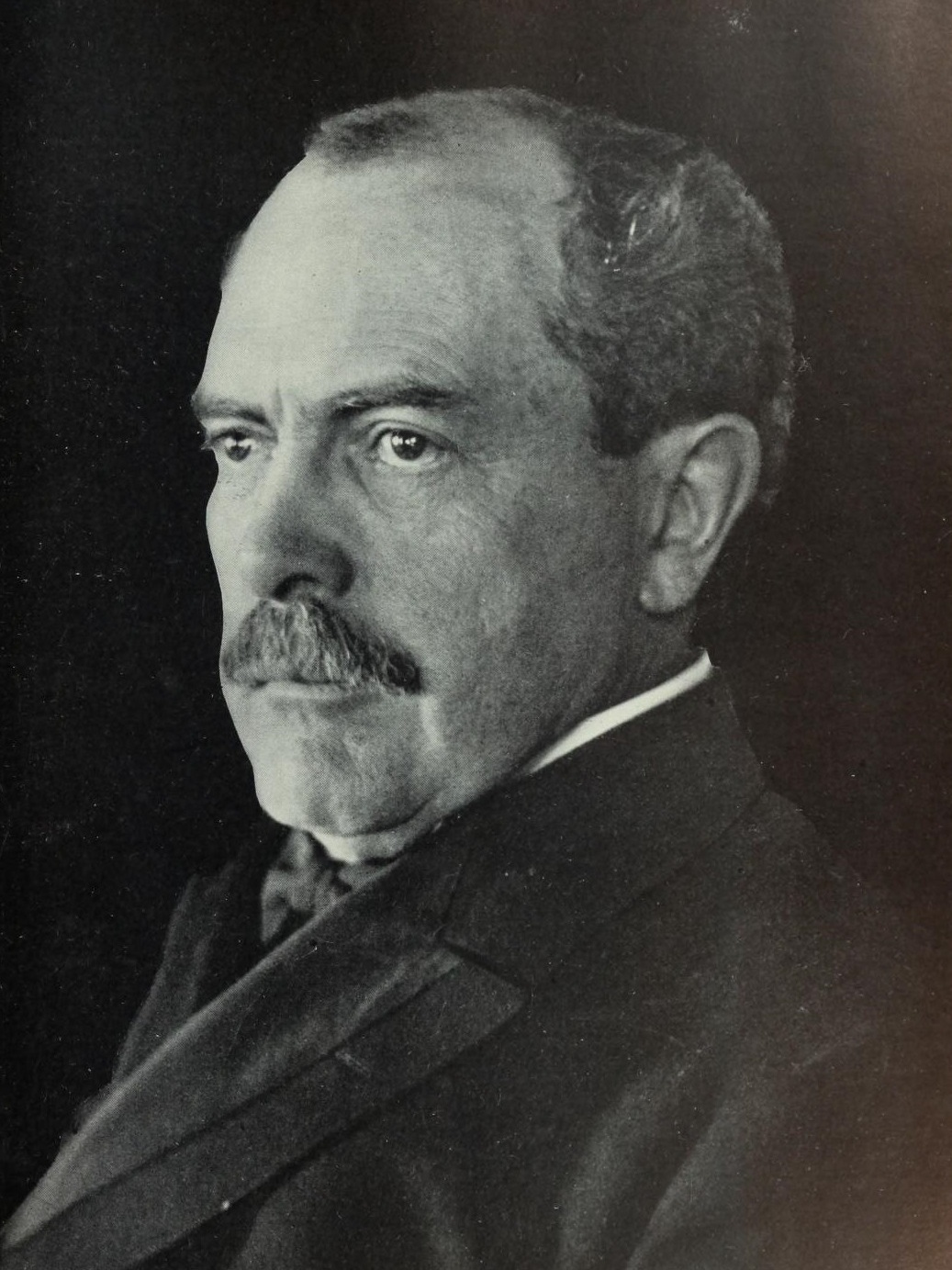

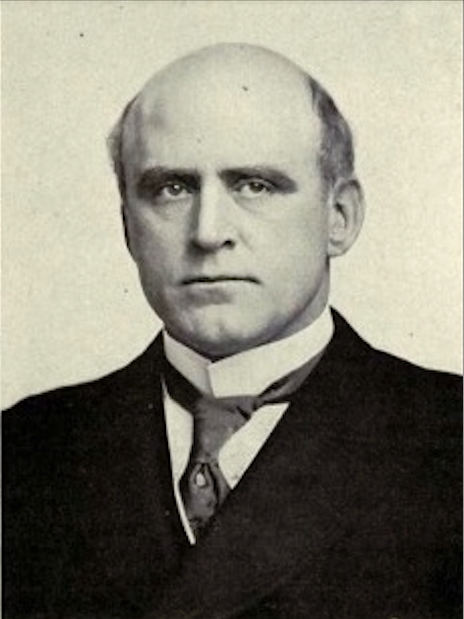

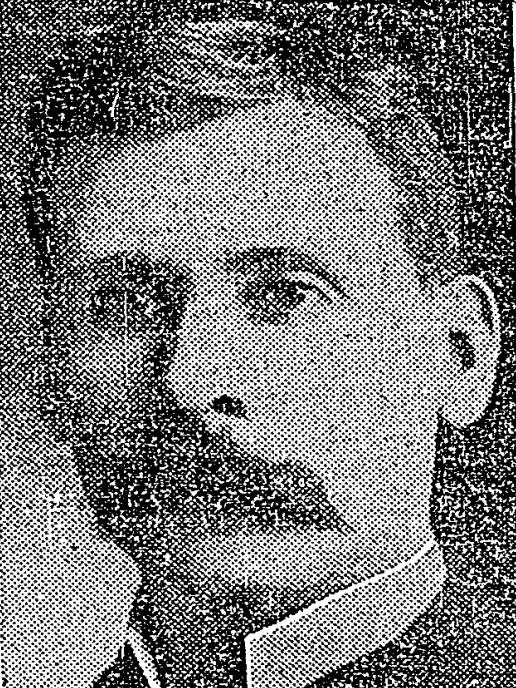
Nominee	Edward Fitzsimmons Dunne	John Maynard Harlan	John Collins
Party	Democratic	Republican	Socialist
Popular vote	163,189	138,548	23,034
Percentage	49.74%	42.23%	7.02%
Mayor before election
Carter Harrison IV
Democratic
Elected mayor
Edward Fitzsimmons Dunne
Democratic

In the Chicago mayoral election of 1905, Democratic nominee Edward Fitzsimmons Dunne defeated Republican nominee John Maynard Harlan and Socialist nominee John Collins.

This was the final regularly scheduled Chicago mayoral election for a two-year term. Subsequent elections have been for four-year terms.

The general election took place on April 4.

Ahead of the election, both major parties selected their nominees at nominating conventions in February. Incumbent Democrat Carter Harrison IV did not seek renomination. Edward F. Dunne, with the backing of a number of political forces, and without opposition from any major player in his party, easily secured support for the Democratic Party nomination and was delivered by acclamation at the party's convention. The Republican Party nominated Harlan at their own convention. In addition, Socialists nominated John Collins at their convention.

== Nominations ==
Chicago held mayoral primary elections. These were indirect primaries, electing delegates to conventions (with the delegates in turn selecting the nominee).

=== Democratic primary ===
The Democratic primary held on February 24.

Incumbent Democrat Carter Harrison IV had, shortly after his 1903 reelection, declared that he would not seek an additional term in 1905. While there was a possibility he could reverse course and seek another term, by 1905 he was facing declining prospects of winning nomination to a fifth consecutive term. Labor unions had come out in support of municipal ownership of the city's streetcars, a stance that Harrison had neither adopted nor was keen on adopting. He was out-of step with the political tides on this issue, as both parties had come to regularly support the idea of municipal ownership. Municipal ownership was a particularly immensely important item to the city's reformers. Harrison had also fractured political relations during the course of the 1904 elections, particularly having made an enemy of William Randolph Hearst and his allies by opposing Hearst's campaign for the Democratic Party's presidential nomination. Additionally, many Chicagoans were growing impatient with Harrison's inability to resolve the city's traction issue. Even before this rise in public dissatisfaction towards his mayoralty, Harrison had only eked out a relatively narrow margin of victory in the city's previous mayoral election. Thus, Harrison decided to announce that, on November 21, 1904, he would indeed not be seeking a fifth consecutive term as mayor.

At the same time that Harrison was seeing a decline in his political prospects, Edward F. Dunne began to rise in prominence. On June 26, 1904, at a Democratic Party picnic, Dunne delivered a speech in which he criticized Harrison for not towing the party's line in its support municipal ownership. Rumors immediately arose that he would challenge Harrison by running as an independent candidate, but Dunne denied this, declaring that he was a loyal Democrat. Former judge William Prentice (a leader of the Chicago Federation of Labor) said that he would run as an independent candidate in support of municipal ownership unless Dunne was the Democratic nominee. In November 1904 Dunne declined a nomination from the Municipal Ownership League to run for mayor as a third-party candidate under their banner.

Murray F. Tuley of the Municipal Ownership League heralded a January draft effort to convince Dunne to run for the Democratic nomination, issuing an open letter on January 15, 1905, calling on Dever to run. On January 23, 1905, delegations from 23 of Chicago's 35 wards urged Dunne to run. Dunne declared he was willing to accept the nomination, but that he would not resign his seat as a judge until he began campaigning. He also pledged to accept no corporate donations.

Dunne had an easy path to the nomination. While the Harrison-aligned Democratic Central Committee did not issue any endorsement, Dune was strongly supported by both the Bryan-Altgeld and Hearst wings of the party. He experienced no strong opposition from the ward bosses or from the Sullivan-Hopkins wing of the party. Despite receiving strong buzz as a prospective candidate, alderman William Emmett Dever did not run against Dunne.

At the party's February nominating convention, Dunne was nominated by acclamation. In his acceptance speech he declared that his central issue as mayor would be implementing municipal ownership of the city's streetcars.

=== Republican primary ===
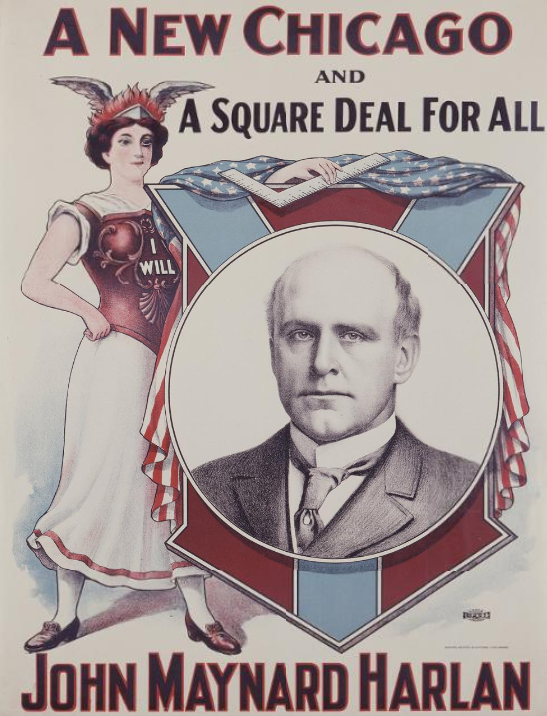
Campaign poster for Republican nominee Harlan promising a Square Deal

The Republican primary was held on February 13.

To compete with Dunne, by then known to be the front-runner for the Democratic nomination, Republicans nominated maverick Republican John Maynard Harlan. Republicans hoped that Harlan might be able to capture some of the support that Dunne would otherwise capture from supporters of municipal ownership. Harlan had campaigned in 1897 on a platform strongly supporting municipal ownership. However, unlike Dunne, Harlan did not back immediate municipal ownership in 1905.

In addition to previously having run a third-party effort 1897, Harlan had run for the Republican nomination in 1901 and in 1903.

Harlan had served an Alderman for two years (1896 through 1898), and was the son of then-sitting United States Supreme Court Associate Justice John Marshall Harlan.

=== Socialist primary ===
The Socialist primary was held on March 4. The primary also saw the election of ward delegates for the party. With John Collins being the only candidate for mayor, he won the mayoral primary. 4,360 votes were cast in the Socialist primary. The cost to taxpayers to hold the primary was $7,620. Collins had received the party's mayoral nomination in 1901 and had also run as the party's nominee for governor of Illinois in 1904. He was also a delegate to the party's 1904 presidential convention.

The Socialists were coming off of a strong performance 1904 United States presidential election in Illinois. Despite this, the party had initially pledged that it would not run its own mayoral candidate if Dunne were to run. However, despite Dunne's presence atop the Democratic ticket, the party nominated John Collins for mayor.

=== Prohibition nomination ===
Oliver W. Stewart received the Prohibition Party nomination.

== General election ==
=== Campaign ===
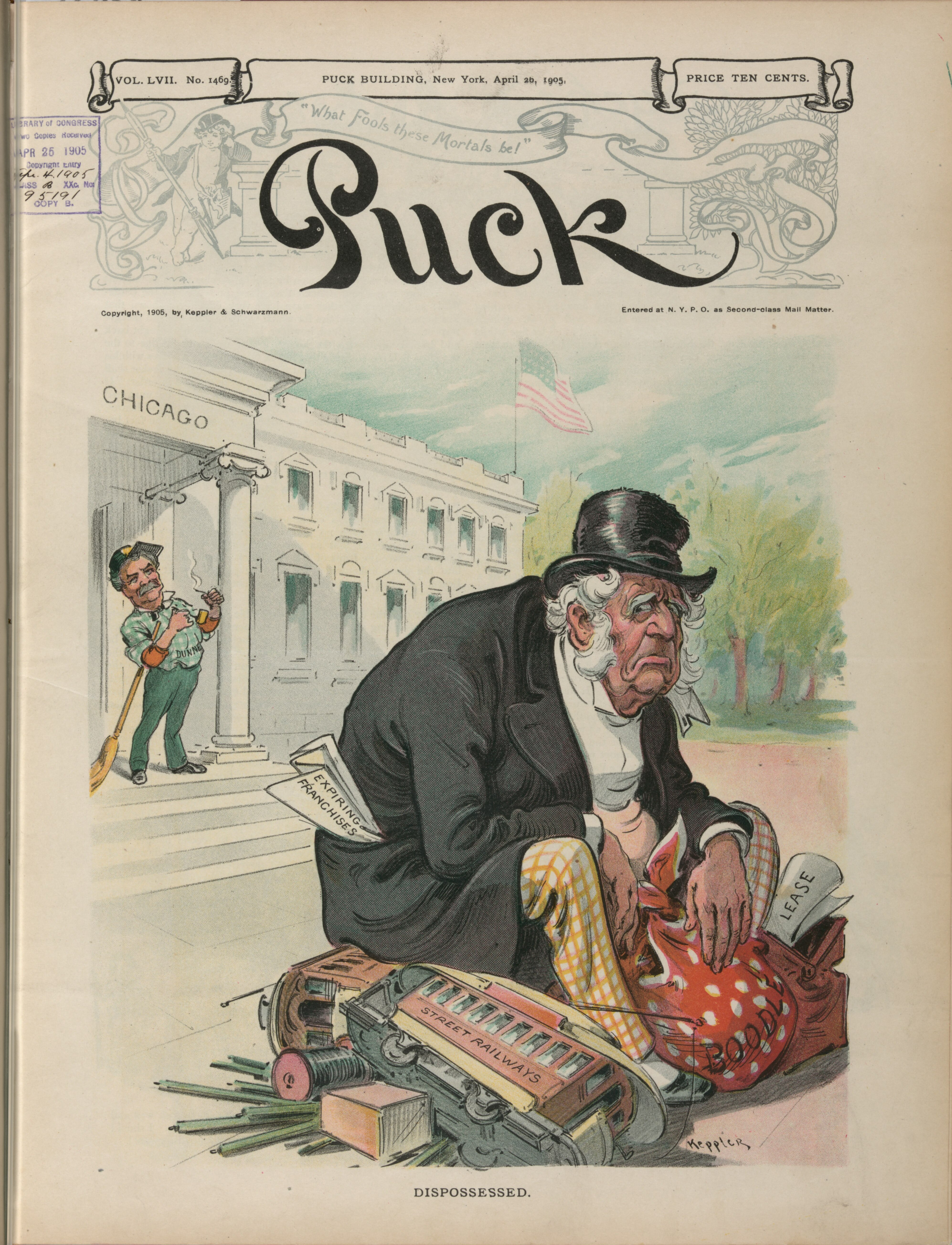
The traction issue was a central matter of the election. This cover of the April 25, 1905 edition of Puck portrays the newly inaugurated Dunne as dispossessing traction interests of their franchises

A judge on the Cook County Circuit Court, Dunne had no prior executive experience. His positions were relatively mainstream among municipal reformers ("social reformers" and "urban liberals") . Like other municipal reformers, Dunne favored having political power be shared with the lower echelons of society rather than being exclusively held by the upper echelons. He also was supportive of labor unions. He was tolerant towards ethnic and cultural diversity and also tolerant towards those with disabilities and impairments. He was a contemporary with progressive leaders of both parties in other American cities, including Tom L. Johnson, Samuel M. Jones, Mark Pagan, Hazen Pingree, and Brand Whitlock.

Dunne was so passionate about municipal ownership that he aspired to, ultimately, have his life be remembered most for two things: being the mayor that would bring municipal ownership to Chicago's transit system and for being the father to his thirteen children. He strongly favored immediate municipal ownership.

Dunne's lack of campaign experience did not hamper him, as he ran a very strong and well-organized campaign. To drive turnout among Democratic voters, Dunne held party rallies in each of the city's wards and delivered remarks aimed at appealing towards strong-Democrats, as well as remarks aimed at winning over the city's ethnic voters. Dunne worked to unite the various wings of the party around support for immediate municipal ownership. Dunne also made active efforts to court independent voters, with the goal of winning-over at least 50,000.

A number of political action groups supported Dunne's candidacy.

Dunne largely avoided endorsing or opposing the reelection campaigns of several ward bosses. However, he did endorse a few that had strongly supported immediate municipal ownership and oppose a few that had opposed it. For instance, in the 19th Ward he supported immediate municipal ownership proponent Simon O'Donnell's challenge to John Powers, an opponent of immediate municipal ownership. Even then, however, he only went as far as lending his support to O'Donnell, and did not directly criticize Powers. In the First Ward, where Michael Kenna enthusiastically backed both Dunne and immediate municipal ownership, Dunne returned the favor by endorsing Kenna.

In 1905, Harlan did not support immediate municipal ownership. While de supported making "ample provision for municipal ownership and operation", he stated that he believed that this could only be implemented at a later date when, "the city can be legally and financially able to successfully adopt it". This differed from his past stance on municipal ownership, and was quite similar to the stance that Carter Harrison IV had held.

Some reformers supported and campaigned on behalf of Harlan. However, many reformers that had supported Harlan's previous 1897 campaign supported Dunne's candidacy instead. Many were dissatisfied with his sudden change in position on the traction issue.

Harlan garnered the support of Harold L. Ickes, William Kent, Raymond Robbins, and Graham Taylor, who together formed the "Non Partisan Harlan Club" to support his candidacy. They supported Harlan due to his strong support for a new municipal charter and out of disapproval of Dunne's political alliances with the Democratic political bosses of the city's wards.

Not only was Harlan opposed by notable figures that had endorsed him in 1897, but he also found significant levels of support from groups which had opposed him in 1897. These included the city's business and banking community, establishment members of the Republican Party, and Republican-leaning newspapers.

=== Endorsements ===
Edward F. Dunne

Individuals

- Jane Addams, activist and proprietor of Hull House
- Clarence Darrow, lawyer and activist
- Michael Kenna, alderman
- Louis F. Post, Georgism activist
- Donald Richberg, attorney
John Maynard Harlan

Individuals

- Harold L. Ickes
- Graham Taylor, minister, activist, educator
- William Kent

Organizations

- Civic Federation
- Municipal Voters League

=== Results ===
Dunne's number of votes was the most votes any candidate had ever received in a Chicago mayoral election, up to that time.

1905 Chicago mayoral election
Party	Candidate	Votes	%
Democratic	Edward F. Dunne	163,189	49.74
Republican	John Maynard Harlan	138,548	42.23
Socialist	John Collins	23,034	7.02
Prohibition	Oliver W. Stewart	3,294	1.00
Turnout		228,065	81

Dunne received 64.99% of the Polish-American vote, while Harlan received 29.73% and Collins received 4.78%.

== See also ==
- Chicago Traction Wars
