= 1901 Chicago mayoral election =

- April 2, 1901
- Turnout: 74% ▼11 pp
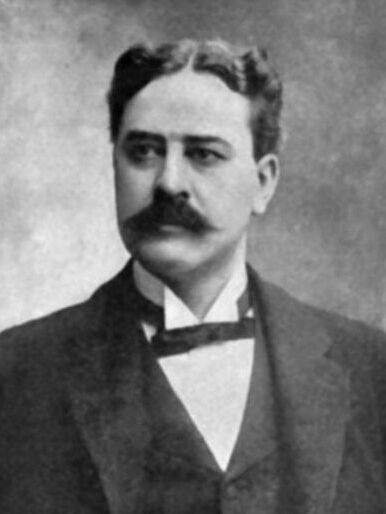

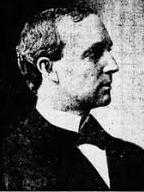
Nominee	Carter Harrison IV	Elbridge Hanecy
Party	Democratic	Republican
Popular vote	156,766	128,413
Percentage	52.69%	43.16%
Mayor before election
Carter Harrison IV
Democratic
Elected mayor
Carter Harrison IV
Democratic

In the Chicago mayoral election of 1901, Democrat Carter Harrison IV was reelected to a third term, defeating Republican nominee Elbridge Hanecy by a 9.5% margin of victory.

The election took place on April 2. Until 2019, no subsequent election had more candidates running on its ballot.

Ahead of the election, there were competitive races to receive the two major party's nominations at their municipal nominating conventions. Mayor Harrison was challenged for the Democratic Party nomination by former governor John Peter Altgeld. However, Altgeld was politically weaker than he once had been, and Harrison easily fended him off. In the March indirect primary to elect the delegates to the city's nominating convention, delegates supporting Harrison won a broad majority. At the convention, Harrison received the party's nomination by acclamation. The Republican Party had a large field of candidates seeking its nomination. Along with Hanecy (who was a judge on the Circuit Court of Cook County), the two other front-running contenders for the Republican nomination were Sanitary District of Chicago president William Boldenweck and former alderman John Maynard Harlan. and incumbent alderman Walter J. Raymer. Other contenders that Henry beat were Judge Marcus Kavanagh and aldermen William Mavor and Frank T. Fowler. Additionally, Alderman William Hale Thompson had initially declared his candidacy, but did not ultimately compete for the nomination at the convention.

== Democratic nomination ==
=== Contenders ===
- Carter Harrison IV, incumbent mayor
- John Peter Altgeld, former governor and third-party candidate for mayor in 1899

=== Primary and convention ===
Incumbent mayor Carter Harrison IV was renominated by the Democratic Party. Harrison's opponent for the nomination was former governor John Peter Altgeld, who had been a third-party challenger in the previous election. Altgeld's 1901 candidacy was not considered a serious threat to Harrison, as Altgeld had lost much of his influence over the preceding two years. There had been rumors that Roger Charles Sullivan and John Patrick Hopkins might recruit a candidate of their own to challenge Harrison, but this never materialized.

In the March primary to elect delegates to the city nominating convention, Harrison-supporting delegate candidates won a large majority. At the convention, Harrison was renominated by acclamation.

== Republican nomination ==
=== Contenders ===
- William Boldenweck, board president of the Chicago Sanitary District
- Frank T. Fowler alderman on the Chicago City Council
- John Maynard Harlan, former alderman on the Chicago City Council
- Elbridge Hanecy, judge of the Cook County Circuit Court and candidate for governor in 1900
- Marcus Kavanagh, judge on the Cook County Superior Court
- William Mavor, alderman on the Chicago City Council
- Walter J. Raymer, alderman on the Chicago City Council

Additionally, there was early speculation that Graeme Stewart (an attorney and member of the Chicago Board of Education) might be a candidate. Initially, alderman William Hale Thompson declared himself a candidate, though he ultimately did not contest at the convention.

=== Convention balloting (overview) ===
The Republican Party nominated Cook County Circuit Court judge Elbridge Hanecy at its city convention on March 2. He captured the nomination on the eighth round of balloting. The top three contenders for the nomination were Hanecy, Harlan, and Boldenweck. Machine Republicans largely backed Hanecy. Independent Republicans largely backed Harlan. German Republicans largely backed Boldenweck.

Hanecy had been a judge on the Cook County Circuit Court for a number of years. The previous year, Hanecy had sought the gubernatorial nomination, being defeated by Richard Yates Jr. at the state convention by a thin margin. Hanecy was politically allied with William Lorimer, being Lorimer's candidate both in this mayoral election and in the previous year's gubernatorial election.

Despite speculation, Harlan denied any intentions of running as an independent if he lost the nomination.

Since every round of voting saw all 940 delegate votes cast, each round required candidates to win 471 votes in order to secure the majority needed for the nomination.

Republican convention balloting
Candidate	1st	2nd (before shifts)	2nd (after shifts)	3rd	4th	5th	6th	7th	8th
Hanecy	222	299	327	370	398	393	392	466	486
Harlan	284	296	296	267	260	247	231	229	202
Boldenweck	158	167	167	161	147	163	185	125	131
Raymer	109	84	84	82	75	78	73	65	64
Fowler	82	66	66	60	60	59	59	55	57
Kavanagh	28	28	0	0	0	0	0	0	0
Mavor	57	0	0	0	0	0	0	0	0

=== Convention balloting (ward results, by round) ===
==== First round ====
Republican convention 1st round balloting by ward
Ward	Hanecy		Harlan		Boldenweck		Raymer		Fowler		Kavanagh		Mavor		Total
Ward	#	%	#	%	#	%	#	%	#	%	#	%	#	%	#
1st	0	0.00	0	0.00	0	0.00	0	0.00	0	0.00	28	100	0	0.00	28
2nd	37	100	0	0.00	0	0.00	0	0.00	0	0.00	0	0.00	0	0.00	37
3rd	25	69.44	6	16.67	0	0.00	0	0.00	0	0.00	0	0.00	5	13.89	36
4th	17	100	0	0.00	0	0.00	0	0.00	0	0.00	0	0.00	0	0.00	17
5th	17	100	0	0.00	0	0.00	0	0.00	0	0.00	0	0.00	0	0.00	17
6th	0	0.00	4	7.84	0	0.00	0	0.00	0	0.00	0	0.00	47	92.16	51
7th	2	4.44	42	93.33	0	0.00	0	0.00	0	0.00	0	0.00	1	2.2	45
8th	12	52.17	4	17.39	3	13.04	0	0.00	0	0.00	0	0.00	4	14.29	23
9th	19	100	0	0.00	0	0.00	0	0.00	0	0.00	0	0.00	0	0.00	19
10th	14	100	0	0.00	0	0.00	0	0.00	0	0.00	0	0.00	0	0.00	14
11th	0	0.00	0	0.00	10	52.63	5	26.32	0	0.00	4	21.05	0	0.00	19
12th	0	0.00	0	0.00	12	50.00	9	26.47	3	8.82	0	0.00	0	0.00	24
13th	12	35.29	0	0.00	3	8.82	8	23.53	11	32.35	0	0.00	0	0.00	34
14th	0	0.00	0	0.00	0	0.00	0	0.00	31	100	0	0.00	0	0.00	31
15th	0	0.00	0	0.00	0	0.00	13	50.00	13	50.00	0	0.00	0	0.00	26
16th	0	0.00	0	0.00	0	0.00	10	66.67	5	33.33	0	0.00	0	0.00	15
17th	0	0.00	3	10.00	0	0.00	20	66.67	7	23.33	0	0.00	0	0.00	30
18th	12	60.00	0	0.00	4	20.00	4	20.00	0	0.00	0	0.00	0	0.00	20
19th	7	36.84	6	31.58	6	31.58	0	0.00	0	0.00	0	0.00	0	0.00	19
20th	26	63.42	0	0.00	5	12.20	5	12.20	5	12.20	0	0.00	0	0.00	41
21st	0	0.00	36	100	0	0.00	0	0.00	0	0.00	0	0.00	0	0.00	36
22nd	0	0.00	28	100	0	0.00	0	0.00	0	0.00	0	0.00	0	0.00	28
23rd	0	0.00	0	0.00	22	100	0	0.00	0	0.00	0	0.00	0	0.00	22
24th	0	0.00	0	0.00	20	100	0	0.00	0	0.00	0	0.00	0	0.00	20
25th	0	0.00	6	13.33	39	86.67	0	0.00	0	0.00	0	0.00	0	0.00	45
26th	0	0.00	3	12.00	22	88.00	0	0.00	0	0.00	0	0.00	0	0.00	25
27th	0	0.00	13	54.17	3	12.50	7	29.17	1	4.17	0	0.00	0	0.00	24
28th	0	0.00	0	0.00	0	0.00	28	100	0	0.00	0	0.00	0	0.00	28
29th	0	0.00	12	100	0	0.00	0	0.00	0	0.00	0	0.00	0	0.00	12
30th	0	0.00	22	100	0	0.00	0	0.00	0	0.00	0	0.00	0	0.00	22
31st	0	0.00	32	100	0	0.00	0	0.00	0	0.00	0	0.00	0	0.00	32
32nd	0	0.00	30	85.71	5	14.29	0	0.00	0	0.00	0	0.00	0	0.00	35
33rd	3	10.00	27	90.00	0	0.00	0	0.00	0	0.00	0	0.00	0	0.00	30
34th	8	53.33	5	33.33	2	13.33	0	0.00	0	0.00	0	0.00	0	0.00	15
35th	11	55.00	5	25.00	2	10.00	0	0.00	2	10.00	0	0.00	0	0.00	20
Total	222	23.62	284	30.21	158	16.89	109	11.60	82	7.98	28	2.98	57	6.06	940

==== Second round (before shifts) ====
After the first ballot, Mavor's name was withdrawn. While Hanecy gained a sizable number of votes on the second ballot, little else changed. At the end of the ballot, the 28 votes cast for Kavanagh in the first ward were silently shifted to Hanecy, although Kavanagh's name was not withdrawn.

Republican convention 2nd round balloting (before shifts) by ward
Ward	Hanecy		Harlan		Boldenweck		Raymer		Fowler		Kavanagh		Total
Ward	#	%	#	%	#	%	#	%	#	%	#	%	#
1st	0	0.00	0	0.00	0	0.00	0	0.00	0	0.00	28	100	28
2nd	37	100	0	0.00	0	0.00	0	0.00	0	0.00	0	0.00	37
3rd	25	69.44	8	22.22	3	8.33	0	0.00	0	0.00	0	0.00	36
4th	17	100	0	0.00	0	0.00	0	0.00	0	0.00	0	0.00	17
5th	17	100	0	0.00	0	0.00	0	0.00	0	0.00	0	0.00	17
6th	34	66.67	10	19.61	6	11.76	1	1.96	0	0.00	0	0.00	51
7th	6	13.33	36	80.00	3	6.67	0	0.00	0	0.00	0	0.00	45
8th	20	86.96	2	8.70	1	4.35	0	0.00	0	0.00	0	0.00	23
9th	19	100	0	0.00	0	0.00	0	0.00	0	0.00	0	0.00	19
10th	14	100	0	0.00	0	0.00	0	0.00	0	0.00	0	0.00	14
11th	0	0.00	0	0.00	14	73.68	5	26.32	0	0.00	0	0.00	19
12th	0	0.00	0	0.00	12	50.00	8	33.33	4	16.67	0	0.00	24
13th	26	76.47	2	5.88	2	5.88	0	0.00	4	11.76	0	0.00	34
14th	0	0.00	0	0.00	0	0.00	0	0.00	31	100	0	0.00	31
15th	0	0.00	0	0.00	0	0.00	13	50.00	13	50.00	0	0.00	26
16th	0	0.00	0	0.00	0	0.00	10	66.67	5	16.67	0	0.00	15
17th	14	46.67	2	6.67	0	0.00	7	23.33	7	23.33	0	0.00	30
18th	12	60.00	0	0.00	4	20.00	4	20.00	0	0.00	0	0.00	20
19th	7	36.84	6	31.58	6	31.58	0	0.00	0	0.00	0	0.00	19
20th	41	100	0	0.00	0	0.00	0	0.00	0	0.00	0	0.00	41
21st	0	0.00	36	100	0	0.00	0	0.00	0	0.00	0	0.00	36
22nd	0	0.00	28	100	0	0.00	0	0.00	0	0.00	0	0.00	28
23rd	0	0.00	0	0.00	22	100	0	0.00	0	0.00	0	0.00	22
24th	0	0.00	0	0.00	20	100	0	0.00	0	0.00	0	0.00	20
25th	0	0.00	6	13.33	39	86.67	0	0.00	0	0.00	0	0.00	45
26th	0	0.00	3	12.00	22	88.00	0	0.00	0	0.00	0	0.00	25
27th	0	0.00	12	50.00	2	8.33	9	37.5	1	4.17	0	0.00	24
28th	0	0.00	0	0.00	0	0.00	28	100	0	0.00	0	0.00	28
29th	4	33.33	5	41.67	3	25.00	0	0.00	0	0.00	0	0.00	12
30th	0	0.00	22	100	0	0.00	0	0.00	0	0.00	0	0.00	22
31st	0	0.00	32	100	0	0.00	0	0.00	0	0.00	0	0.00	32
32nd	0	0.00	30	85.71	5	14.29	0	0.00	0	0.00	0	0.00	35
33rd	7	23.33	23	76.67	0	0.00	0	0.00	0	0.00	0	0.00	30
34th	9	76.67	4	26.67	2	13.33	0	0.00	0	0.00	0	0.00	15
35th	14	70.00	5	25.00	1	5.00	0	0.00	2	10.00	0	0.00	20
Total	299	31.80	296	31.49	167	17.77	84	8.94	66	7.02	28	2.98	940

==== Second round (after shifts) ====
Republican convention 2nd round balloting (after shifts) by ward
Ward	Hanecy		Harlan		Boldenweck		Raymer		Fowler		Kavanagh		Total
Ward	#	%	#	%	#	%	#	%	#	%	#	%	#
1st	28	100	0	0.00	0	0.00	0	0.00	0	0.00	0	0.00	28
2nd	37	100	0	0.00	0	0.00	0	0.00	0	0.00	0	0.00	37
3rd	25	69.44	8	22.22	3	8.33	0	0.00	0	0.00	0	0.00	36
4th	17	100	0	0.00	0	0.00	0	0.00	0	0.00	0	0.00	17
5th	17	100	0	0.00	0	0.00	0	0.00	0	0.00	0	0.00	17
6th	34	66.67	10	19.61	6	11.76	1	1.96	0	0.00	0	0.00	51
7th	6	13.33	36	80.00	3	6.67	0	0.00	0	0.00	0	0.00	45
8th	20	86.96	2	8.70	1	4.35	0	0.00	0	0.00	0	0.00	23
9th	19	100	0	0.00	0	0.00	0	0.00	0	0.00	0	0.00	19
10th	14	100	0	0.00	0	0.00	0	0.00	0	0.00	0	0.00	14
11th	0	0.00	0	0.00	14	73.68	5	26.32	0	0.00	0	0.00	19
12th	0	0.00	0	0.00	12	50.00	8	33.33	4	16.67	0	0.00	24
13th	26	76.47	2	5.88	2	5.88	0	0.00	4	11.76	0	0.00	34
14th	0	0.00	0	0.00	0	0.00	0	0.00	31	100	0	0.00	31
15th	0	0.00	0	0.00	0	0.00	13	50.00	13	50.00	0	0.00	26
16th	0	0.00	0	0.00	0	0.00	10	66.67	5	16.67	0	0.00	15
17th	14	46.67	2	6.67	0	0.00	7	23.33	7	23.33	0	0.00	30
18th	12	60.00	0	0.00	4	20.00	4	20.00	0	0.00	0	0.00	20
19th	7	36.84	6	31.58	6	31.58	0	0.00	0	0.00	0	0.00	19
20th	41	100	0	0.00	0	0.00	0	0.00	0	0.00	0	0.00	41
21st	0	0.00	36	100	0	0.00	0	0.00	0	0.00	0	0.00	36
22nd	0	0.00	28	100	0	0.00	0	0.00	0	0.00	0	0.00	28
23rd	0	0.00	0	0.00	22	100	0	0.00	0	0.00	0	0.00	22
24th	0	0.00	0	0.00	20	100	0	0.00	0	0.00	0	0.00	20
25th	0	0.00	6	13.33	39	86.67	0	0.00	0	0.00	0	0.00	45
26th	0	0.00	3	12.00	22	88.00	0	0.00	0	0.00	0	0.00	25
27th	0	0.00	12	50.00	2	8.33	9	37.5	1	4.17	0	0.00	24
28th	0	0.00	0	0.00	0	0.00	28	100	0	0.00	0	0.00	28
29th	4	33.33	5	41.67	3	25.00	0	0.00	0	0.00	0	0.00	12
30th	0	0.00	22	100	0	0.00	0	0.00	0	0.00	0	0.00	22
31st	0	0.00	32	100	0	0.00	0	0.00	0	0.00	0	0.00	32
32nd	0	0.00	30	85.71	5	14.29	0	0.00	0	0.00	0	0.00	35
33rd	7	23.33	23	76.67	0	0.00	0	0.00	0	0.00	0	0.00	30
34th	9	76.67	4	26.67	2	13.33	0	0.00	0	0.00	0	0.00	15
35th	14	70.00	5	25.00	1	5.00	0	0.00	2	10.00	0	0.00	20
Total	327	34.79	296	31.49	167	17.77	84	8.94	66	7.02	0	0.00	940

==== Third round ====
Republican convention 3rd round balloting by ward
Ward	Hanecy		Harlan		Boldenweck		Raymer		Fowler		Total
Ward	#	%	#	%	#	%	#	%	#	%	#
1st	28	100	0	0.00	0	0.00	0	0.00	0	0.00	28
2nd	37	100	0	0.00	0	0.00	0	0.00	0	0.00	37
3rd	31	86.11	5	13.89	0	0.00	0	0.00	36		
4th	17	100	0	0.00	0	0.00	0	0.00	0	0.00	17
5th	17	100	0	0.00	0	0.00	0	0.00	0	0.00	17
6th	21	41.18	26	51.98	4	8.48	0	0.00	0	0.00	51
7th	7	15.56	35	77.78	3	6.67	0	0.00	0	0.00	45
8th	21	91.30	2	8.70	0	0.00	0	0.00	0	0.00	23
9th	19	100	0	0.00	0	0.00	0	0.00	0	0.00	19
10th	14	100	0	0.00	0	0.00	0	0.00	0	0.00	14
11th	0	0.00	0	0.00	14	73.68	5	26.32	0	0.00	19
12th	0	0.00	0	0.00	12	50.00	8	33.33	4	16.67	24
13th	26	76.47	2	5.88	2	5.88	0	0.00	4	11.76	34
14th	0	0.00	0	0.00	0	0.00	0	0.00	31	100	31
15th	0	0.00	0	0.00	0	0.00	13	50.00	13	50.00	26
16th	0	0.00	0	0.00	0	0.00	10	66.67	5	33.33	15
17th	14	46.67	2	6.67	2	6.67	6	20.00	6	20.00	30
18th	20	100	0	0.00	0	0.00	0	0.00	0	0.00	20
19th	7	36.84	0	0.00	12	63.16	0	0.00	0	0.00	19
20th	41	100	0	0.00	0	0.00	0	0.00	0	0.00	41
21st	0	0.00	36	100	0	0.00	0	0.00	0	0.00	36
22nd	0	0.00	28	100	0	0.00	0	0.00	0	0.00	28
23rd	0	0.00	0	0.00	22	100	0	0.00	0	0.00	22
24th	0	0.00	0	0.00	20	100	0	0.00	0	0.00	20
25th	0	0.00	6	13.33	39	86.67	0	0.00	0	0.00	45
26th	0	0.00	3	12.00	22	88.00	0	0.00	0	0.00	25
27th	1	4.17	9	37.50	2	8.33	12	50.00	0.00	0.00	24
28th	0	0.00	0	0.00	0	0.00	28	100	0	0.00	28
29th	5	41.67	4	33.33	3	25.00	0	0.00	0	0.00	12
30th	0	0.00	22	100	0	0.00	0	0.00	0	0.00	22
31st	0	0.00	32	100	0	0.00	0	0.00	0	0.00	32
32nd	2	5.71	30	85.71	3	8.57	0	0.00	0	0.00	35
33rd	12	40.00	18	60.00	0	0.00	0	0.00	0	0.00	30
34th	9	76.67	4	26.67	2	13.33	0	0.00	0	0.00	15
35th	13	65.00	5	25.00	1	5.00	0	0.00	1	5.00	20
Total	370	39.36	267	28.40	161	17.13	82	8.72	60	6.38	940

==== Fourth round ====
Republican convention 4th round balloting by ward
Ward	Hanecy		Harlan		Boldenweck		Raymer		Fowler		Total
Ward	#	%	#	%	#	%	#	%	#	%	#
1st	28	100	0	0.00	0	0.00	0	0.00	0	0.00	28
2nd	37	100	0	0.00	0	0.00	0	0.00	0	0.00	37
3rd	31	86.11	0	0.00	5	13.89	0	0.00	0	0.00	36
4th	17	100	0	0.00	0	0.00	0	0.00	0	0.00	17
5th	17	100	0	0.00	0	0.00	0	0.00	0	0.00	17
6th	23	45.10	28	54.90	0	0.00	0	0.00	0	0.00	51
7th	7	15.56	35	77.78	3	6.67	0	0.00	0	0.00	45
8th	23	100	0.00	0.00	0	0.00	0	0.00	0	0.00	23
9th	19	100	0	0.00	0	0.00	0	0.00	0	0.00	19
10th	14	100	0	0.00	0	0.00	0	0.00	0	0.00	14
11th	0	0.00	0	0.00	14	73.68	5	26.32	0	0.00	19
12th	0	0.00	0	0.00	12	50.00	8	33.33	4	16.67	24
13th	34	100	0	0.00	0	0.00	0	0.00	0	0.00	34
14th	0	0.00	0	0.00	0	0.00	0	0.00	31	100	31
15th	0	0.00	0	0.00	0	0.00	13	50.00	13	50.00	26
16th	0	0.00	0	0.00	0	0.00	10	66.67	5	33.33	15
17th	14	46.67	2	6.67	2	6.67	6	20.00	6	20.00	30
18th	20	100	0	0.00	0	0.00	0	0.00	0	0.00	20
19th	19	100	0	0.00	0	0.00	0	0.00	0	0.00	19
20th	41	100	0	0.00	0	0.00	0	0.00	0	0.00	41
21st	0	0.00	36	100	0	0.00	0	0.00	0	0.00	36
22nd	0	0.00	28	100	0	0.00	0	0.00	0	0.00	28
23rd	0	0.00	0	0.00	22	100	0	0.00	0	0.00	22
24th	0	0.00	0	0.00	20	100	0	0.00	0	0.00	20
25th	0	0.00	6	13.33	39	86.67	0	0.00	0	0.00	45
26th	0	0.00	3	12.00	22	88.00	0	0.00	0	0.00	25
27th	10	41.67	7	29.17	2	8.33	5	20.83	0	0.00	24
28th	0	0.00	0	0.00	0	0.00	28	100	0	0.00	28
29th	5	41.67	4	33.33	3	25.00	0	0.00	0	0.00	12
30th	0	0.00	22	100	0	0.00	0	0.00	0	0.00	22
31st	0	0.00	32	100	0	0.00	0	0.00	0	0.00	32
32nd	2	5.71	30	85.71	3	8.57	0	0.00	0	0.00	35
33rd	15	50.00	15	50.00	0	0.00	0	0.00	0	0.00	30
34th	9	76.67	4	26.67	2	13.33	0	0.00	0	0.00	15
35th	13	65.00	5	25.00	1	5.00	0	0.00	1	5.00	20
Total	398	42.34	260	27.66	147	15.64	75	8.72	60	6.38	940

==== Fifth round ====
During the vote, sixth ward chairman declared 28 votes for Hanecy, 21 for Halan, and 2 for Boldenweck. However, this was challenged and the delegation was polled twice resulting in it casting 27 votes for Hanecy and 24 votes for Harlan.

Republican convention 5th round balloting by ward
Ward	Hanecy		Harlan		Boldenweck		Raymer		Fowler		Total
Ward	#	%	#	%	#	%	#	%	#	%	#
1st	28	100	0	0.00	0	0.00	0	0.00	0	0.00	28
2nd	37	100	0	0.00	0	0.00	0	0.00	0	0.00	37
3rd	31	86.11	3	8.33	2	5.56	0	0.00	0	0.00	36
4th	17	100	0	0.00	0	0.00	0	0.00	0	0.00	17
5th	17	100	0	0.00	0	0.00	0	0.00	0	0.00	17
6th	24	45.06	27	52.94	0	0.00	0	0.00	0	0.00	51
7th	9	20.00	33	73.33	3	6.67	0	0.00	0	0.00	45
8th	23	100	0.00	0.00	0	0.00	0	0.00	0	0.00	23
9th	19	100	0	0.00	0	0.00	0	0.00	0	0.00	19
10th	14	100	0	0.00	0	0.00	0	0.00	0	0.00	14
11th	0	0.00	0	0.00	14	73.68	5	26.32	0	0.00	19
12th	0	0.00	0	0.00	12	50.00	8	33.33	4	16.67	24
13th	34	100	0	0.00	0	0.00	0	0.00	0	0.00	34
14th	0	0.00	0	0.00	0	0.00	0	0.00	31	100	31
15th	0	0.00	0	0.00	0	0.00	13	50.00	13	50.00	26
16th	0	0.00	0	0.00	0	0.00	10	66.67	5	33.33	15
17th	14	46.67	2	6.67	2	6.67	6	20.00	6	20.00	30
18th	20	100	0	0.00	0	0.00	0	0.00	0	0.00	20
19th	0	0.00	0	0.00	19	100	0	0.00	0	0.00	19
20th	41	100	0	0.00	0	0.00	0	0.00	0	0.00	41
21st	0	0.00	36	100	0	0.00	0	0.00	0	0.00	36
22nd	0	0.00	28	100	0	0.00	0	0.00	0	0.00	28
23rd	0	0.00	0	0.00	22	100	0	0.00	0	0.00	22
24th	0	0.00	0	0.00	20	100	0	0.00	0	0.00	20
25th	0	0.00	6	13.33	39	86.67	0	0.00	0	0.00	45
26th	0	0.00	3	12.00	22	88.00	0	0.00	0	0.00	25
27th	10	41.67	4	16.66	2	8.33	8	3.33	0	0.00	24
28th	0	0.00	0	0.00	0	0.00	28	100	0	0.00	28
29th	5	41.67	4	33.33	3	25.00	0	0.00	0	0.00	12
30th	0	0.00	22	100	0	0.00	0	0.00	0	0.00	22
31st	0	0.00	32	100	0	0.00	0	0.00	0	0.00	32
32nd	3	8.57	29	82.86	3	8.57	0	0.00	0	0.00	35
33rd	12	40.00	18	60.00	0	0.00	0	0.00	0	0.00	30
34th	15	100	0	0.00	0	0.00	0	0.00	0	0.00	15
35th	17	85.00	3	15.00	0	0.00	0	0.00	0	0.00	20
Total	393	41.81	260	26.28	163	17.34	78	8.30	59	6.28	940

==== Sixth round ====
Republican convention 6th round balloting by ward
Ward	Hanecy		Harlan		Boldenweck		Raymer		Fowler		Total
Ward	#	%	#	%	#	%	#	%	#	%	#
1st	28	100	0	0.00	0	0.00	0	0.00	0	0.00	28
2nd	37	100	0	0.00	0	0.00	0	0.00	0	0.00	37
3rd	0	0.00	0	0.00	36	100	0	0.00	0	0.00	36
4th	17	100	0	0.00	0	0.00	0	0.00	0	0.00	17
5th	17	100	0	0.00	0	0.00	0	0.00	0	0.00	17
6th	26	50.98	21	41.18	4	7.84	0	0.00	0	0.00	51
7th	7	15.56	33	73.33	5	11.11	0	0.00	0	0.00	45
8th	23	100	0.00	0.00	0	0.00	0	0.00	0	0.00	23
9th	19	100	0	0.00	0	0.00	0	0.00	0	0.00	19
10th	14	100	0	0.00	0	0.00	0	0.00	0	0.00	14
11th	19	100	0	0.00	0	0.00	0	0.00	0	0.00	19
12th	12	50.00	0	0.00	0	0.00	8	33.33	4	16.67	24
13th	34	100	0	0.00	0	0.00	0	0.00	0	0.00	34
14th	0	0.00	0	0.00	0	0.00	0	0.00	31	100	31
15th	0	0.00	0	0.00	0	0.00	13	50.00	13	50.00	26
16th	0	0.00	0	0.00	0	0.00	10	66.67	5	33.33	15
17th	14	46.67	2	6.67	2	6.67	6	20.00	6	20.00	30
18th	20	100	0	0.00	0	0.00	0	0.00	0	0.00	20
19th	0	0.00	0	0.00	19	100	0	0.00	0	0.00	19
20th	41	100	0	0.00	0	0.00	0	0.00	0	0.00	41
21st	0	0.00	36	100	0	0.00	0	0.00	0	0.00	36
22nd	3	10.71	20	100	5	17.86	0	0.00	0	0.00	28
23rd	0	0.00	0	0.00	22	100	0	0.00	0	0.00	22
24th	0	0.00	0	0.00	20	100	0	0.00	0	0.00	20
25th	0	0.00	6	13.33	39	86.67	0	0.00	0	0.00	45
26th	0	0.00	3	12.00	22	88.00	0	0.00	0	0.00	25
27th	10	41.67	4	16.66	2	8.33	8	3.33	0	0.00	24
28th	0	0.00	0	0.00	0	0.00	28	100	0	0.00	28
29th	5	41.67	4	33.33	3	25.00	0	0.00	0	0.00	12
30th	0	0.00	22	100	0	0.00	0	0.00	0	0.00	22
31st	0	0.00	32	100	0	0.00	0	0.00	0	0.00	32
32nd	0	0.00	29	82.86	6	17.14	0	0.00	0	0.00	35
33rd	14	46.67	16	53.33	0	0.00	0	0.00	0	0.00	30
34th	15	100	0	0.00	0	0.00	0	0.00	0	0.00	15
35th	17	85.00	3	15.00	0	0.00	0	0.00	0	0.00	20
Total	392	41.70	231	24.57	185	19.68	73	7.75	59	6.28	940

==== Seventh round ====
Republican convention 7th round balloting by ward
Ward	Hanecy		Harlan		Boldenweck		Raymer		Fowler		Total
Ward	#	%	#	%	#	%	#	%	#	%	#
1st	28	100	0	0.00	0	0.00	0	0.00	0	0.00	28
2nd	37	100	0	0.00	0	0.00	0	0.00	0	0.00	37
3rd	34	94.44	0	0.00	2	5.56	0	0.00	0	0.00	36
4th	17	100	0	0.00	0	0.00	0	0.00	0	0.00	17
5th	17	100	0	0.00	0	0.00	0	0.00	0	0.00	17
6th	27	52.94	20	39.22	4	7.84	0	0.00	0	0.00	51
7th	7	15.56	32	71.11	6	13.33	0	0.00	0	0.00	45
8th	23	100	0.00	0.00	0	0.00	0	0.00	0	0.00	23
9th	19	100	0	0.00	0	0.00	0	0.00	0	0.00	19
10th	14	100	0	0.00	0	0.00	0	0.00	0	0.00	14
11th	19	100	0	0.00	0	0.00	0	0.00	0	0.00	19
12th	24	100	0	0.00	0	0.00	0	0.00	0	0.00	24
13th	34	100	0	0.00	0	0.00	0	0.00	0	0.00	34
14th	0	0.00	0	0.00	0	0.00	0	0.00	31	100	31
15th	0	0.00	0	0.00	0	0.00	13	50.00	13	50.00	26
16th	0	0.00	0	0.00	0	0.00	10	66.67	5	33.33	15
17th	14	46.67	2	6.67	2	6.67	6	20.00	6	20.00	30
18th	20	100	0	0.00	0	0.00	0	0.00	0	0.00	20
19th	19	100	0	0.00	0	0.00	0	0.00	0	0.00	19
20th	41	100	0	0.00	0	0.00	0	0.00	0	0.00	41
21st	0	0.00	36	100	0	0.00	0	0.00	0	0.00	36
22nd	8	28.57	20	100	0	0.00	0	0.00	0	0.00	28
23rd	0	0.00	0	0.00	22	100	0	0.00	0	0.00	22
24th	0	0.00	0	0.00	20	100	0	0.00	0	0.00	20
25th	0	0.00	6	13.33	39	86.67	0	0.00	0	0.00	45
26th	0	0.00	3	12.00	22	88.00	0	0.00	0	0.00	25
27th	10	41.67	4	16.66	2	8.33	8	3.33	0	0.00	24
28th	0	0.00	0	0.00	0	0.00	28	100	0	0.00	28
29th	5	41.67	4	33.33	3	25.00	0	0.00	0	0.00	12
30th	0	0.00	22	100	0	0.00	0	0.00	0	0.00	22
31st	0	0.00	32	100	0	0.00	0	0.00	0	0.00	32
32nd	3	8.57	29	82.86	3	8.57	0	0.00	0	0.00	35
33rd	14	46.67	16	53.33	0	0.00	0	0.00	0	0.00	30
34th	15	100	0	0.00	0	0.00	0	0.00	0	0.00	15
35th	17	85.00	3	15.00	0	0.00	0	0.00	0	0.00	20
Total	466	49.57	229	24.36	125	13.30	65	6.91	55	5.85	940

==== Eighth round ====
Republican convention 8th round balloting by ward
Ward	Hanecy		Harlan		Boldenweck		Raymer		Fowler		Total
Ward	#	%	#	%	#	%	#	%	#	%	#
1st	28	100	0	0.00	0	0.00	0	0.00	0	0.00	28
2nd	37	100	0	0.00	0	0.00	0	0.00	0	0.00	37
3rd	34	94.44	0	0.00	2	5.56	0	0.00	0	0.00	36
4th	17	100	0	0.00	0	0.00	0	0.00	0	0.00	17
5th	17	100	0	0.00	0	0.00	0	0.00	0	0.00	17
6th	33	64.71	14	27.45	4	7.84	0	0.00	0	0.00	51
7th	14	31.11	25	55.56	6	13.33	0	0.00	0	0.00	45
8th	23	100	0.00	0.00	0	0.00	0	0.00	0	0.00	23
9th	19	100	0	0.00	0	0.00	0	0.00	0	0.00	19
10th	14	100	0	0.00	0	0.00	0	0.00	0	0.00	14
11th	19	100	0	0.00	0	0.00	0	0.00	0	0.00	19
12th	24	100	0	0.00	0	0.00	0	0.00	0	0.00	24
13th	34	100	0	0.00	0	0.00	0	0.00	0	0.00	34
14th	0	0.00	0	0.00	0	0.00	0	0.00	31	100	31
15th	0	0.00	0	0.00	0	0.00	13	50.00	13	50.00	26
16th	0	0.00	0	0.00	0	0.00	10	66.67	5	33.33	15
17th	14	46.67	2	6.67	4	13.33	5	16.66	5	16.66	30
18th	20	100	0	0.00	0	0.00	0	0.00	0	0.00	20
19th	19	100	0	0.00	0	0.00	0	0.00	0	0.00	19
20th	41	100	0	0.00	0	0.00	0	0.00	0	0.00	41
21st	0	0.00	36	100	0	0.00	0	0.00	0	0.00	36
22nd	14	50.00	14	50.00	0	0.00	0	0.00	0	0.00	28
23rd	0	0.00	0	0.00	22	100	0	0.00	0	0.00	22
24th	0	0.00	0	0.00	20	100	0	0.00	0	0.00	20
25th	0	0.00	2	4.44	43	95.56	0	0.00	0	0.00	45
26th	0	0.00	3	12.00	22	88.00	0	0.00	0	0.00	25
27th	10	41.67	4	16.66	2	8.33	8	3.33	0	0.00	24
28th	0	0.00	0	0.00	0	0.00	28	100	0	0.00	28
29th	5	41.67	4	33.33	3	25.00	0	0.00	0	0.00	12
30th	0	0.00	22	100	0	0.00	0	0.00	0	0.00	22
31st	0	0.00	32	100	0	0.00	0	0.00	0	0.00	32
32nd	3	8.57	29	82.86	3	8.57	0	0.00	0	0.00	35
33rd	15	50.00	15	50.00	0	0.00	0	0.00	0	0.00	30
34th	15	100	0	0.00	0	0.00	0	0.00	0	0.00	15
35th	17	85.00	0	0.00	0	0.00	0	0.00	3	15.00	20
Total	486	51.70	202	21.49	131	13.94	64	6.81	57	6.06	940

== Third-party nominations ==
The Prohibition Party nominated Avery E. Hoyt. Ahead of their city nominating convention (held February 21 at Willard Hall), those discussed as possible nominees included Hoyt, J. P. Tracey, and John H. Leslie.

The Social Democratic Party nominated Guy Hoyt, the Socialist Party nominated John Collins, and the Socialist Labor Party nominated John R. Peptin.

The Single Tax Party nominated Thomas Rhodes. The Single Tax Party was a national organization. It championed Georgism.

== General election ==
=== Campaigning ===
Henacy campaigned actively, delivering many speeches. Henacy aimed to present himself as a positive alternative to Harrison. He advocated changing the fee system practiced by some city officials and also proposed stronger measures to regulate the streetcar companies. However, his attempts to adopt reformist policies were weakened in their effectiveness by his association with William Lorimer. Reform-minded Republicans were upset that the seedy Lorimer managed to get his preferred candidate nominated by the Republican Party over reformist favorite John Maynard Harlan. Some Republicans unsuccessfully sought to persuade Harlan to run as an independent.

The Republican Party's platform criticized the Harrison administration as "inefficient", "notorious", "scandalous", "dishonest", and cowardly negligent in its,

manner of defending correct and dishonest damage suits against the city, its prostitution of our public schools, its pernicious effect upon the realty and industrial values whereby the property of the individual has been depreciated in value while manufacturing and other industrial interests have been driven from our city.

The traction issue surfaced in this election. The Democratic platform advocated for municipal ownership of street railways. The Democratic platform did not advocate for immediate public ownership, however, making provisions in its platform for the extension of franchises. The Democratic platform advocated for,

Twenty years as the maximum of franchises pending the final ownership by the city with the percentage of the gross receipts as compensation, lower fares in rush hours and better facilitites, and weaver of rights claimed under the 99-year act.

Not only did Henacy propose stronger measures to regulate streetcar companies, but the Republican convention had declared that,

The franchise question must be settled fairly, honestly and promptly between all parties. Long franchises will not be granted. Full and fair compensation must be paid for special privileges in all streets, alleys, and public grounds. The extension of street railway franchises and lowering of the tunnels are questions which demand the immediate attention of the city and must be promptly and fearlessly met. These question should be settled and adjusted simultaneously with each other, and all interests should receive fair and honest treatment.

The Democratic platform also advocated municipal ownership of other public utilities, including gas, electricity, and water.

Harrison took his Republican challenger serious, and campaigned vigorously against him.

=== Results ===
By the standards of the era in Chicago politics, Harrison's margin of victory was viewed as a decisive one.

Harrison carried 26 wards while Hanecy carried the remaining nine.

In some of the most Republican parts of the city, Hanecy only managed to win a plurality of the vote, and in others he lost the vote to Harrison. However, Harrison, likewise, suffered in some of the city's Democratic strongholds.

1901 Chicago mayoral election
Party	Candidate	Votes	%
Democratic	Carter Harrison IV (incumbent)	156,766	52.69
Republican	Elbridge Hanecy	128,413	43.16
Social Democratic	John Collins (Chicago SDP)	5,284	1.78
Prohibition	Avery E. Hoyt	3,328	1.12
Social Democratic	Guy Hoyt (Springfield SDP)	2,043	0.69
Single Tax	Thomas Rhodes	1,028	0.35
Socialist Labor	John R. Peptin	679	0.23
Turnout		297,541	

Harrison received 72.96% of the Polish-American vote, while Hanecy received 23.54% and Collins received 2.74%.
