= 1903 Chicago mayoral election =

- April 7, 1903
- Turnout: 84% ▲10 pp
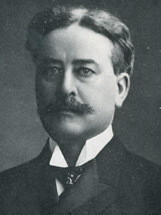

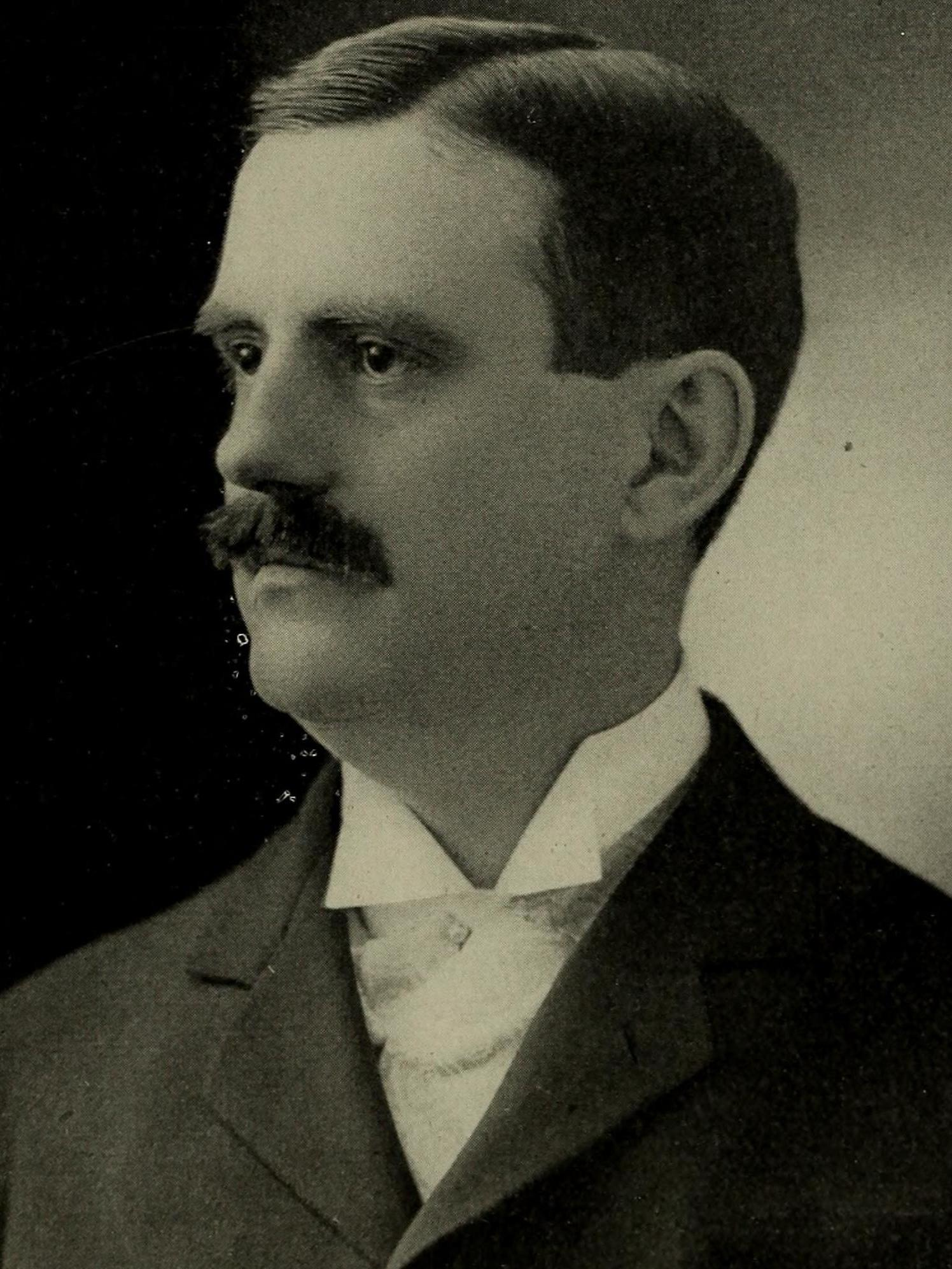
Nominee	Carter Harrison IV	Graeme Stewart
Party	Democratic	Republican
Popular vote	146,208	138.648
Percentage	47.22%	44.78%
Mayor before election
Carter Harrison IV
Democratic
Elected mayor
Carter Harrison IV
Democratic

In the Chicago mayoral election of 1903, Democrat Carter Harrison IV was reelected to a fourth term, defeating Republican nominee Graeme Stewart.

The election took place on April 7. Before the election, both Harrison and Stewart had received their party's nominations by acclamation at each party's municipal nominating convention.

== Background ==
1903 was shaping up to be a challenging reelection for incumbent Democrat Carter Harrison IV

By 1903, the municipal reform movement in Chicago, which had been on the rise since the 1890s, had become a strong force in Chicago politics.

By 1903, an anti-Harrison coalition had begun to arise in Chicago, consisting of members of union ( including in the Chicago Federation of Labor), former Harrison ally Robert "Bobby" Burke's followers, and remnants of what had been the once-strong Altgeld wing of the Democratic party.

In 1903, the traction issue was a popular concern, particularly the issue of municipal ownership of streetcars.

== Nominations ==
=== Democratic ===
Incumbent mayor Carter Harrison IV was renominated by the Democratic Party. Few others seemed interested in seeking the nomination.

While there had been factional disputes within the party, most of the Democratic Party united behind Harrison as a nominee. A key exception to this was Harrison's once-ally Robert "Bobby" Burke, who remained opposed to Harrison.

Harrison easily won the primaries to select delegates for the city's nominating convention, with his supporters being heavily selected as delegates. A pro-Harrison delegate nominee even beat former Cook County Democratic Party Chairman Thomas Gahan, who had been seeking to run as a delegate aligned with then-Harrison rival Robert "Bobby" Burke.

Without an opponent, Harrison was renominated at the convention by acclamation. The convention, however, was noted as having been a rather unenthusiastic affair, appearing to signal more tepid or reluctant support of Harrison by his party.

=== Republican ===
Businessman Greame Stewart won the Republican nomination. He had previously served as a member of the executive committee of the 1900 Republican National Convention. From 1882 through 1890 he was a member of the Chicago Board of Education, serving as the board's president from 1889 through 1890. With an exceptional reputation for honesty and public service, Stewart had long been considered a potential candidate for mayor of Chicago. Stewart was appealing to reform-minded voters dissatisfied with the Democratic political machine.

Also seeking the mayoral nomination was former alderman John Maynard Harlan, who had previously run for mayor as an independent Republican in 1897 and had unsuccessfully sought the Republican nomination in 1901.

In February, delegates favoring Stewart won the a 2–1 margin of victory in the Republican primaries over delegates supporting Harlan.

At the city's Republican convention on March 7, Stewart was nominated in a single round of balloting. Afterwards, resolutions were adopted to affirm Stewart's nomination by acclamation.

Republican convention nominating roll call
Candidate	Votes	%
Greame Stewart	598	63.62
John Maynard Harlan	342	36.38
Total	940	100

Convention vote by ward
Ward	Stewart		Harlan		Total
Ward	#	%	#	%	#
1st	28	100	0	0.0	28
2nd	37	100	0	0.0	37
3rd	21	58.3	15	41.7	36
4th	17	100	0	0.0	17
5th	17	100	0	0.0	17
6th	22	43.1	29	56.7	51
7th	5	11.1	40	88.9	45
8th	0	0.0	23	100	23
9th	19	100	0	0.0	19
10th	14	100	0	0.0	14
11th	14	100	0	0.0	14
12th	24	100	0	0.0	24
13th	33	97.1	1	2.9	34
14th	24	74.2	7	22.6	31
15th	22	84.6	4	15.4	26
16th	9	60.0	6	40.0	15
17th	30	100	0	0.0	30
18th	20	100	0	0.0	20
19th	19	100	0	0	19
20th	38	92.7	3	7.3	41
21st	36	100	0	0	36
23rd	16	72.7	6	13.6	22
24th	17	85	3	15	20
25th	40	88.9	5	11.1	45
26th	25	100	0	0	25
27th	12	50.0	12	50.0	24
28th	28	100	0	0	28
29th	4	33.3	8	66.6	12
30th	8	36.4	14	63.6	22
31st	32	100	0	0	32
32nd	33	94.3	2	5.7	35
33rd	22	73.3	8	26.7	30
34th	15	100	0	0	15
35th	8	40.0	12	60.0	20

=== United Labor ===
The United Labor Party first nominated Clarence Darrow, who thereafter declined the nomination. While the party had been formed in hopes of nominating Darrow, after he declined it moved on and nominated Daniel L. Cruise.

Beginning at the start of 1903, there had been a strong push among members of the Chicago Federation of Labor and others to draft Darrow as an independent candidate for mayor. After an active and organized effort to draft him, which even included a nominating convention-style pro-Darrow mass meeting held at the Auditorium Theatre on February 16, and active consideration of a prospective run on his part, it appeared in late February that Darrow might be preparing to enter the race. However, on February 24, he made the surprise announcement that he would not be running.

=== Prohibition ===
The Prohibition Party nominated Thomas L. Haines.

=== Socialist ===
The Socialist Party nominated Charles L. Breckon.

=== Socialist Labor ===
The Socialist Labor Party nominated Henry Sale.

== General election ==
Both major parties were unified behind their candidates.

The major party candidates not both only resided in the city's twenty-first ward, but each also resided in the exact same voting precinct.

The traction issue became the primary issue of the election. Both candidates supported ultimately supported ultimately having municipal ownership for the streetcar services. Stewart advocated making immediate improvements to its conditions by accepting the best terms the streetcar companies were willing to offer. Harrison advocated holding off on an agreement until the city received the terms it desired.

Harrison worked to paint Stewart as a puppet of corporations and special interests, particularly the streetcar companies.

Republicans worked to paint Harrison as an enabler of corruption. They also worked to paint him as having made few substantive accomplishments in his tenure as mayor, and utilized the slogan "six years, nothing doing" against Harrison.

Stewart's own platform promised reform. In an attempt to make it appear that he was not a product of the political machine, Stewart attempted to convince the electorate that businessmen and not politicians had been the ones who had urged him to run.

Late into the race, Clarence Darrow came forward as a campaign surrogate in support of Harrison, swaying a lot of labor voters in Harrison's favor.

=== Results ===
The result was considered to be a close one.

While they lost the mayoralty, in the coinciding elections, Republicans were able to win the races for City Attorney and City Clerk (having won the latter race by a mere several hundred vote margin).

In the coinciding Chicago City Council election, Republicans won a weakened majority. The City Council went from having 39 Republicans, 30 Democrats, and one independent before the 1903 election, to having 35 Republicans, 33 Democrats, and one independent afterwards.

Democrat Ernest Hummel also won the coinciding election for City Treasurer.

Stewart had overwhelmingly won the vote in first precinct of the twenty-first ward, where both he and Harrison resided. Harrison had won this precinct in the previous election.

1903 Chicago mayoral election
Party	Candidate	Votes	%
Democratic	Carter Harrison IV	146,208	47.22
Republican	Graeme Stewart	138.648	44.78
Socialist	Charles L. Breckon	11,124	3.59
United Labor	Daniel L. Cruice	9,947	3.21
Prohibition	Thomas L. Haines	2,674	0.86
Socialist Labor	Henry Sale	1,014	0.33
Turnout		309,615	84

Harrison received 64.38% of the Polish-American vote, while Stewart received 31.51%.
