= John Harlan =

John Harlan may refer to:

- John Marshall Harlan (1833–1911), US Supreme Court Justice, 1877–1911
- John Marshall Harlan II (1899–1971), US Supreme Court Justice, 1955–1971, grandson of the pre-World War I justice
- John Harlan (announcer) (1925–2017), American television announcer
- John Maynard Harlan (1864–1934), American lawyer and politician in Chicago

== See also ==
- John Harlin (1935–1966), American mountaineer and US Air Force pilot
- John Harlan Kim (born 1993), Australian actor
