= George W. Alschuler =

American businessman and politician (1864-1936)

Member of the Illinois House of Representatives
- In office 1909–1913

Mayor of Aurora, Illinois
- In office 1901–1903

Member of the Aurora City Council
- In office 1899–1903

Personal details
- Born: April 20, 1864
- Died: November 5, 1936 (aged 72) Aurora, Illinois, U.S.
- Party: Democratic
- Relatives: Samuel Alschuler (brother)
- Occupation: Politician, businessman

George W. Alschuler (April 20, 1864 – November 5, 1936) was an American businessman and politician.

Alschuler attended public schools in Aurora, Illinois. He was involved in the insurance and real estate business. Alschuler served on the Aurora City Council from 1899 to 1903. He then served as mayor of Aurora from 1901 to 1903. Alschuler was a Democrat. He served in the Illinois House of Representatives from 1909 to 1913. His brother United States Circuit Court judge Samuel Alschuler also served in the Illinois General Assembly. Alschuler died in an automobile accident in Aurora, Illinois when the automobile hit a telephone pole.

== Notes ==
Party political offices
Preceded by Samuel L. Nelson	Democratic nominee for Treasurer of Illinois; 1928	Succeeded by Edward J. Barrett
