= Samuel Alschuler =

American judge (1859–1939)

- Portrait c. 1915–1930

Senior Judge of the United States Court of Appeals for the Seventh Circuit
- In office May 15, 1936 – November 9, 1939

Judge of the United States Court of Appeals for the Seventh Circuit
- In office August 16, 1915 – May 15, 1936
- Appointed by: Woodrow Wilson
- Preceded by: Peter S. Grosscup
- Succeeded by: Walter Emanuel Treanor

Personal details
- Born: Samuel Alschuler; November 20, 1859 Chicago, Illinois, U.S.
- Died: November 9, 1939 (aged 79)
- Party: Democratic
- Relatives: George Alschuler (brother)
- Education: Read law

Samuel Alschuler (November 20, 1859 – November 9, 1939) was an American politician and judge who served as a United States circuit judge of the United States Court of Appeals for the Seventh Circuit from 1915 to 1939, including three years as a senior judge. A Democrat from Illinois, Alschuler previously served as a member of the Illinois House of Representatives for two terms from 1895 to 1901 and was the Democratic nominee for the 1900 Illinois gubernatorial election.

== Early life ==
Samuel Alschuler was born November 20, 1859 Chicago, Illinois. A member of a civically-engaged German-Jewish family, his brother George also served in the Illinois House of Representatives and another brother, Benjamin, was a judge of the Illinois Court of Claims. Alschuler was raised in Aurora, Illinois. After graduating from Aurora High School, Alschuler spent some time as a general store clerk, read law, and was admitted to the Illinois Bar.

== Legal and political career ==
Alschuler in 1895.

Alschuler worked in private practice in Aurora, in partnership with J. C. Murphy, a former US Attorney for the District of Dakota Territory, under the firm name of Alschuler & Murphy. Alschuler continued in private practice in Chicago until 1915.

In the 1892 United States House of Representatives elections, Alschuler was the Democratic nominee for Illinois's 5th congressional district, a staunchly Republican-voting district anchored by Kane County. After Alschuler lost his 1892 congressional race, Governor John Peter Altgeld appointed him a member of the State Commission of Claims on July 15, 1893.

Alschuler was elected to the Illinois House of Representatives in the 1896 general election. In his first term, Alschuler served in a role analogous to a floor leader. In his second term, he was the chairman of the Democratic Steering Committee.

In 1900 Illinois gubernatorial election, Alschuler was the Democratic nominee against Republican candidate Richard Yates Jr. Yates defeated Alschuler by a narrow 5.43% margin. Shortly after the gubernatorial election, he was the Democratic nominee for appointment by the Illinois General Assembly in January 1901 to the United States Senate. However, the Republican Party held a state senate majority, and re-elected Republican incumbent Shelby Moore Cullom to serve another six-year term.

In 1912, Alschuler once again sought the Democratic nomination for Governor of Illinois, losing the nomination to former Chicago mayor Edward Fitzsimmons Dunne. Dunne was subsequently elected Governor during the general election in a four-way race.

== Federal judicial service ==
Alschuler and Chief Justice William Howard Taft in 1928.

Alschuler received a recess appointment from President Woodrow Wilson on August 16, 1915, to a seat on the United States Court of Appeals for the Seventh Circuit vacated by Judge Peter S. Grosscup. He was nominated to the same position by President Wilson on January 7, 1916. He was confirmed by the United States Senate on January 18, 1916, and received his commission the same day. He was a member of the Conference of Senior Circuit Judges (now the Judicial Conference of the United States) from 1924 to 1934.

On May 7, 1935, Republican Congressman Everett Dirksen from Illinois introduced a resolution, H.R. Res. 214, to launch an impeachment inquiry into Alschuler. Dirksen delivered remarks accusing Alschuler of having acted improperly in a 1934 case he presided over by showing bias and partiality in favor of several parties including the Pullman Company, Safety Co, Edward Fitzsimmons Dunne Sr., and Edward Fitzsimmons Dunne Jr. against the Marshall Electric Company. The resolution was referred to the Judiciary Committee. A week later, the House adopted a resolution, H.R. Res. 220, granting the Judiciary Committee authority to hold hearings.

Alschuler assumed senior status on May 15, 1936. His service terminated on November 9, 1939, due to his death.

== Other service ==
Alschuler was appointed to arbitrate between meatpacking unions in Chicago and employers after the President's Mediation Commission intervened in November 1917. From 1922 to 1923, Alschuler served on the new Federal Coal Commission.

== See also ==
- Federal Coal Commission

== Sources ==
Party political offices
Preceded by John Peter Altgeld	Democratic nominee for Governor of Illinois; 1900	Succeeded by Lawrence B. Stringer
Legal offices
Preceded by Peter S. Grosscup	Judge of the United States Court of Appeals for the Seventh Circuit; 1915–1936	Succeeded by Walter Emanuel Treanor
