= John Maynard Harlan =

American lawyer

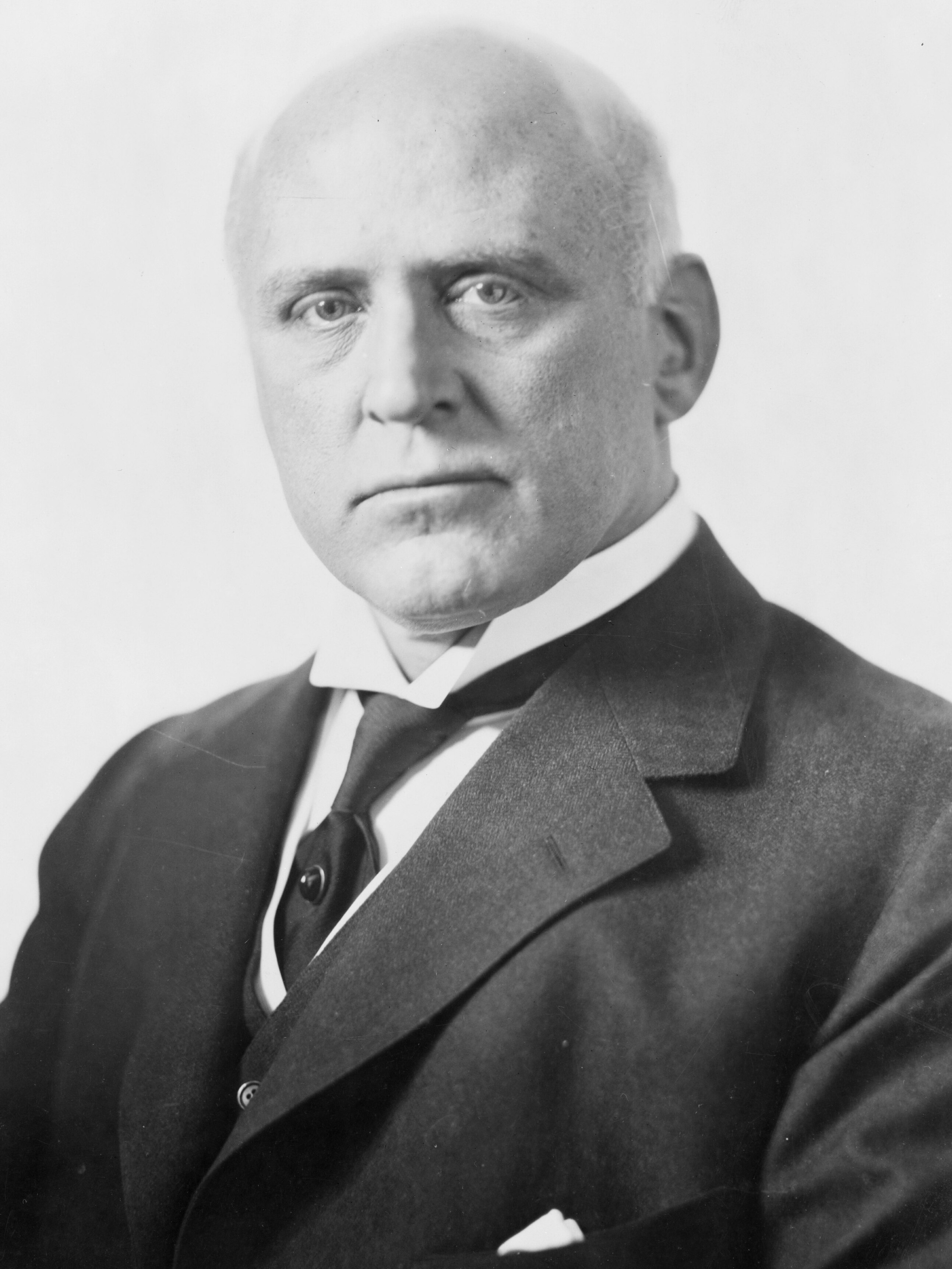
- 1916 photograph of Harlan

Chicago Alderman from the 22nd ward
- In office 1896–1898 Serving with Adolphus W. Maltby
- Preceded by: Henry C. Schendorf
- Succeeded by: Fred W. Upham

Personal details
- Born: December 12, 1864; Frankfort, Kentucky, U.S.
- Died: March 23, 1934 (aged 69); New York City, New York, U.S.
- Resting place: Rock Creek Cemetery, Washington, D.C.
- Political party: Republican
- Children: John Marshall Harlan II
- Parents: John Marshall Harlan (father); Malvina Shanklin (mother)
- Relatives: James S. Harlan (brother), James Harlan (grandfather)
- Occupation: Lawyer

John Maynard Harlan (1864–1934) was an American lawyer and politician who served as a member of the Chicago City Council. Harlan, multiple times, ran for the mayoralty of Chicago.

He was the son of U.S. Supreme Court Justice John Marshall Harlan, and the father of Justice John Marshall Harlan II.

== Early life and family ==
Harlan was born December 12, 1864, in Frankfort, Kentucky. He was the youngest son of John Marshall Harlan (who would serve as an associate justice of the United States Supreme Court from 1877 through 1911) and Malvina Shanklin Harlan.

Historically, Harlan's family had been politically active. His forebear George Harlan served as one of provincial governors of the lower three counties of the Province of Pennsylvania during the seventeenth century (these counties would later form the state of Delaware; his grandfather James Harlan was a congressman during the 1830s.

Harlan's brother James S. Harlan was attorney general of Puerto Rico and then chairman of the Interstate Commerce Commission.

At the age of fifteen, Harlan began attending Princeton University. He graduated in 1884, after four years of study. He spent the subsequent two years completing postgraduate studies at Columbia University and the University of Berlin. He also graduated from George Washington University Law School.

== Career ==
Harlan first worked for his father as a law clerk.

Harlan then moved to Chicago, Illinois, in 1888 to practice law. Harlan became a prominent lawyer in Chicago, working at the firm Harlan and Harlan.

While, in his early political career, Harlan had established himself as an opponent of the city's traction interests, he would ultimately represent them after financial strains took a toll on his legal firm, and after he had mellowed his political stance towards these interests and other lucrative clients.

After a long career in Chicago, in either 1911 or 1912, he and his family moved from Chicago to Washington, D.C. In 1924, he moved to New York City.

While Harlan had achieved prominence and had become well-connected, he lacked much financial success, and would ultimately die in poverty.

=== Political career ===
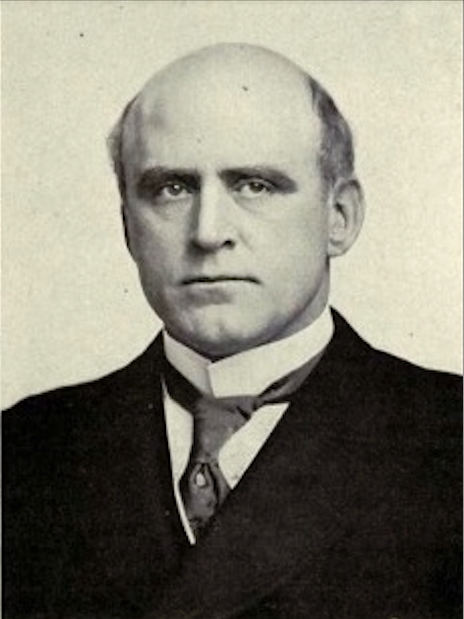
Portrait of Harlan

From 1896 through 1898, Harlan served as a Chicago alderman for the 22nd Ward.

During his time involved in Chicago politics, he became regarded as an expert on the city's traction issue.

As an alderman, he was responsible for the "Harlan Report", a well-founded assessment of legal matters associated with public transit. On June 21, 1897, only twelve days after Governor John Riley Tanner signed the Allen Law, Harlan introduced the so-called "Harlan resolution" to the Chicago City Council, which would appoint a committee to investigate the traction issue and the conditions of the street railways. The resolution passed on October 13. The resultant committee consisted of Harlan, William Jackson, Adolphus T. Maltby, and William T. Mayoble. Mayor Carter Harrison IV served as ex-officio chairman. George E. Hooker was appointed its secretary. The "Harlan Report" was the product of this investigation, and was submitted on March 28, 1898.

In 1896, Harlan traveled to the Illinois State Capitol to play a role in an effort to lobby against the possible election by the legislature of Martin B. Madden as United States Senator. The effort was successful in seeing Madden withdraw himself from consideration.

Harlan was on the ballot as an independent Republican in the 1920 Illinois gubernatorial election.

==== Campaigns for mayor ====
Harlan ran for mayor of Chicago as an independent Republican in the 1897 Chicago mayoral election, placing a distant second behind Democratic nominee Carter Harrison IV in a multi-candidate race. Taking advantage of the city's traction concern, Harlan ran on a platform which sought greater regulation for streetcars, and advocated the solution of municipal ownership of the city's streetcar lines.

Harlan unsuccessfully sought the Republican nomination for mayor in 1901, losing the nomination to Elbridge Hanecy. Harlan's candidacy had drawn the support of many non-machine/independent Republicans, such as Harold L. Ickes. After Hanecy won the nomination, there were unsuccessful efforts to draft Harlan into making an independent run in the general election.

Harlan again unsuccessfully sought the Republican nomination for mayor in 1903, losing the nomination to Graeme Stewart.

In 1905, Harlan won the Republican nomination for mayor. He lost the general election to Democratic nominee Edward Fitzsimmons Dunne. By the time of the 1905 election, Harlan's position on the traction issue, including his stance on municipal ownership, had significantly weakened. His Democratic opponent, Dunne, was a staunch supporter of municipal ownership, and many of those who supported Harlan's 1897 campaign backed Dunne instead, while a number of groups that had opposed Harlan's 1897 candidacy backed him in 1905.

== Personal life ==
On October 21, 1891, Harlan married Elizabeth Palmer Flagg, with whom he had three daughters and a son. Harlan's son John Marshall Harlan, named for Harlan's own father and often referred to as John Marshall Harlan II to distinguish the two, became an associate justice of the United States Supreme Court like his namesake, serving from 1955 through 1971.

Harlan's father-in-law was Ethan Flagg of Yonkers, New York, the industrialist who constructed the Ethan Flagg House.

=== Death ===
Harlan died March 23, 1934, at his residence in Manhattan in New York City after suffering from a long illness. He was buried at Rock Creek Cemetery in Washington, D.C.
