= 1900 Illinois gubernatorial election =

- November 6, 1900
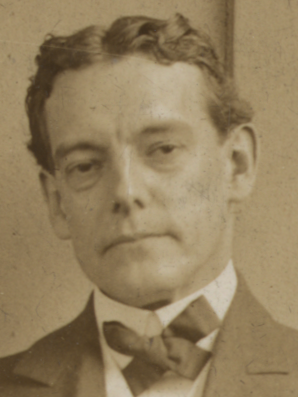

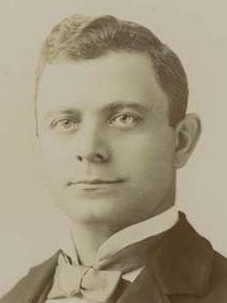
Nominee	Richard Yates Jr.	Samuel Alschuler
Party	Republican	Democratic
Popular vote	580,199	518,966
Percentage	51.49%	46.06%
- County results Yates: 40–50% 50–60% 60–70% 70–80% Alschuler: 40–50% 50–60% 60–70%
Governor before election
John Riley Tanner
Republican
Elected Governor
Richard Yates Jr.
Republican

The 1900 Illinois gubernatorial election was held on November 6, 1900. Republican governor John Riley Tanner retired to run for U.S. Senate. Republican nominee Richard Yates Jr. defeated Democratic nominee Samuel Alschuler with 51.49 percent of the vote.

== Republican nomination ==
=== Candidates ===
- Orrin N. Carter, Cook County judge
- Elbridge Hanecy, judge of the Circuit Court of Cook County
- Walter Reeves, U.S. representative from Streator
- Richard Yates Jr., U.S. collector of internal revenue

=== Results ===
The Republican state convention was held from May 8, 1900 at Peoria.

The results of the balloting were as follows:

1900 Illinois Republican convention
Ballot	1st	2nd	3rd	4th
Richard Yates Jr.	272.5	276	345.5	971
Walter Reeves	331.5	410	482.5	566
Elbridge Hanecy	573.5	529	430	0
Orrin N. Carter	359.5	322	279	0

== Democratic nomination ==
=== Candidates ===
- Samuel Alschuler, assemblyman from Aurora
- Charles K. Ladd, lawyer
- Alfred Orendorff, former adjutant general of the Illinois National Guard
- Adam Ortseifen, Chicago treasurer
- Nicholas E. Worthington, state circuit judge and former U.S. representative from Peoria

=== Results ===
The Democratic state convention was held on June 26 and 27, 1900 at the State Capitol in Springfield.

The results of the balloting were as follows:

1900 Illinois Democratic convention
Ballot	1st	2nd
Samuel Alschuler	448.5	608.5
Adam Ortseifen	411.5	417.5
Alfred Orendorff	252.5	136
Nicholas E. Worthington	48	43
Charles K. Ladd	45	0

== General election ==
=== Candidates ===
- Samuel Alschuler, assemblyman from Aurora (Democratic)
- Visscher Vare Barnes, candidate for the U.S. representative in 1898 (Prohibition)
- John Cordingly (United Christian)
- Alfred Cheesbrough Van Tine, farmer (Populist)
- Louis P. Hoffman (Socialist Labor)
- Herman C. Perry (Social Democrat)
- Lloyd G. Spencer (Union Reform)
- Richard Yates Jr., U.S. collector of internal revenue (Republican)

=== Results ===
Illinois gubernatorial election, 1900
Party	Candidate	Votes	%	±%
Republican	Richard Yates Jr.	580,199	51.49%	
Democratic	Samuel Alschuler	518,966	46.06%	
Prohibition	Visscher Vare Barnes	15,643	1.39%	
Social Democratic	Herman C. Perry	8,611	0.76%	
Socialist Labor	Louis P. Hoffman	1,319	0.12%	
Populist	Alfred Cheesbrough Van Tine	1,106	0.10%	
Union Reform	Lloyd G. Spencer	650	0.06%	
United Christian	John Cordingly	334	0.03%	
Majority		61,233	5.43%	
Turnout		1,126,828	100.00%	
Republican hold		Swing		

== See also ==
- 1900 Illinois lieutenant gubernatorial election

== Bibliography ==
- J. L. Pickering (1901). Official Directory of the Forty-Second General Assembly of Illinois. Session of 1901. Springfield, Illinois: Press of Talbott & Hamann.
- Compiled by James A. Rose, Secretary of State (1900). Official vote of the State of Illinois cast at the General Election, November 6, 1900. Springfield, Illinois: Phillips Bros., State Printers.
