= Alfred Orendorff =

American politician

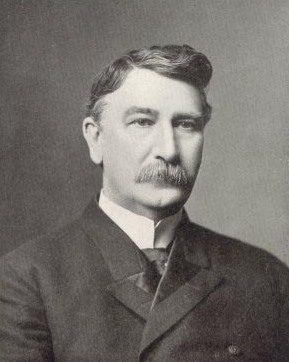
Alfred Orendorff

Alfred Orendorff (20 July 1845 – 22 October 1909) was an Illinois lawyer and politician.

== Biography ==
Alfred Orendorff was born in Logan County, Illinois, on July 20, 1845, the son of Joseph Orendorff and Elizabeth (Stevens) Orendorff. Joseph Orendorff was a farmer and a miller (his father, Alfred Orendorff's grandfather, Christopher Orendorff, built the first water-powered gristmill in the county). Joseph Orendorff died in 1853; with his mother, Alfred then moved to Lincoln, Illinois, where he attended normal schools. Alfred Orendorff was educated at Illinois Wesleyan University. During the American Civil War, he organized a company of the 133rd Illinois Volunteer Infantry Regiment and was commissioned as the company's captain. After the war, he attended Albany Law School, graduating in 1866.

In autumn 1867, Orendorff moved to Springfield, Illinois and began practicing law alongside William Herndon and Charles S. Zane at their law firm, Herndon & Zane. On June 22, 1870, Orendorff married Julia Jay Williams, daughter of John Williams. Together they had three children: John, Alice, and Lydia.

Orendorff also began a political career in 1870, when the Republicans selected him as their nominee for the Illinois Senate; Orendorff lost the general election to Democrat Alexander Starne. Orendorff then threw in his lot with the Democrats and was a delegate to the 1872 Democratic National Convention, at which he supported the presidential candidacy of Sen. Lyman Trumbull. In 1873, the Liberal Republican Party nominated Orendorff for the Illinois House of Representatives and Orendorff was subsequently endorsed by the Democrats. During this session, he was a member of the Judiciary Committed and helped draft a number of statutes necessitated by the 1870 Illinois Constitution.

Orendorff joined the Oddfellows in 1873 and went on to hold a number of positions in that organization.

In 1875, Charles S. Zane was elected as a judge and departed from Herndon & Zane. Orendorff assumed the role of a partner in the firm, leading to its renaming as Herndon & Orendorff. Subsequently, in 1879, Orendorff, along with James A. Creighton, established a new firm known as Orendorff & Creighton. When Creighton was elected as a judge in 1885, Orendorff entered into a partnership with Robert H. Patton, forming Orendorff & Patton.

Orendorff remained active in the Illinois Democratic Party, serving several terms as chairman of the Democratic state central committee and attending several Democratic National Conventions. He was the Democratic candidate for Illinois Treasurer in 1882 and 1884, but lost on both occasions.

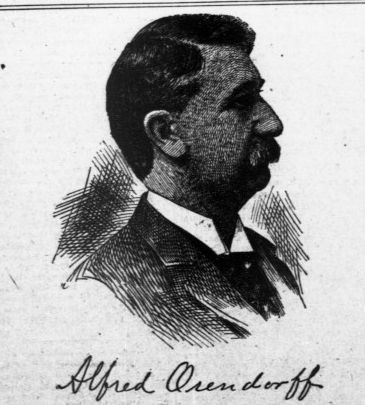
Alfred Orendorff and signature in The Broad Ax March 24, 1900

In addition to law and politics, Orendorff was active in business, serving as president of the Sterling Life Insurance Company of Springfield and of the International Bank & Trust Company of Vinita.

In 1893, Governor of Illinois John Peter Altgeld named Orendorff adjutant general of the Illinois National Guard and Orendorff held this position from January 20, 1893, until January 3, 1896.

Orendorff served as president of the Sangamon County Bar Association, and then, in 1897–98, as president of the Illinois State Bar Association. He was also a director of the Illinois State Historical Society and a member of the Benevolent and Protective Order of Elks, the Sangamon Club, and the Iroquois Club of Chicago.

Orendorff died on October 22, 1909, and is buried in Oak Ridge Cemetery.
