= Elbridge Hanecy =

American lawyer

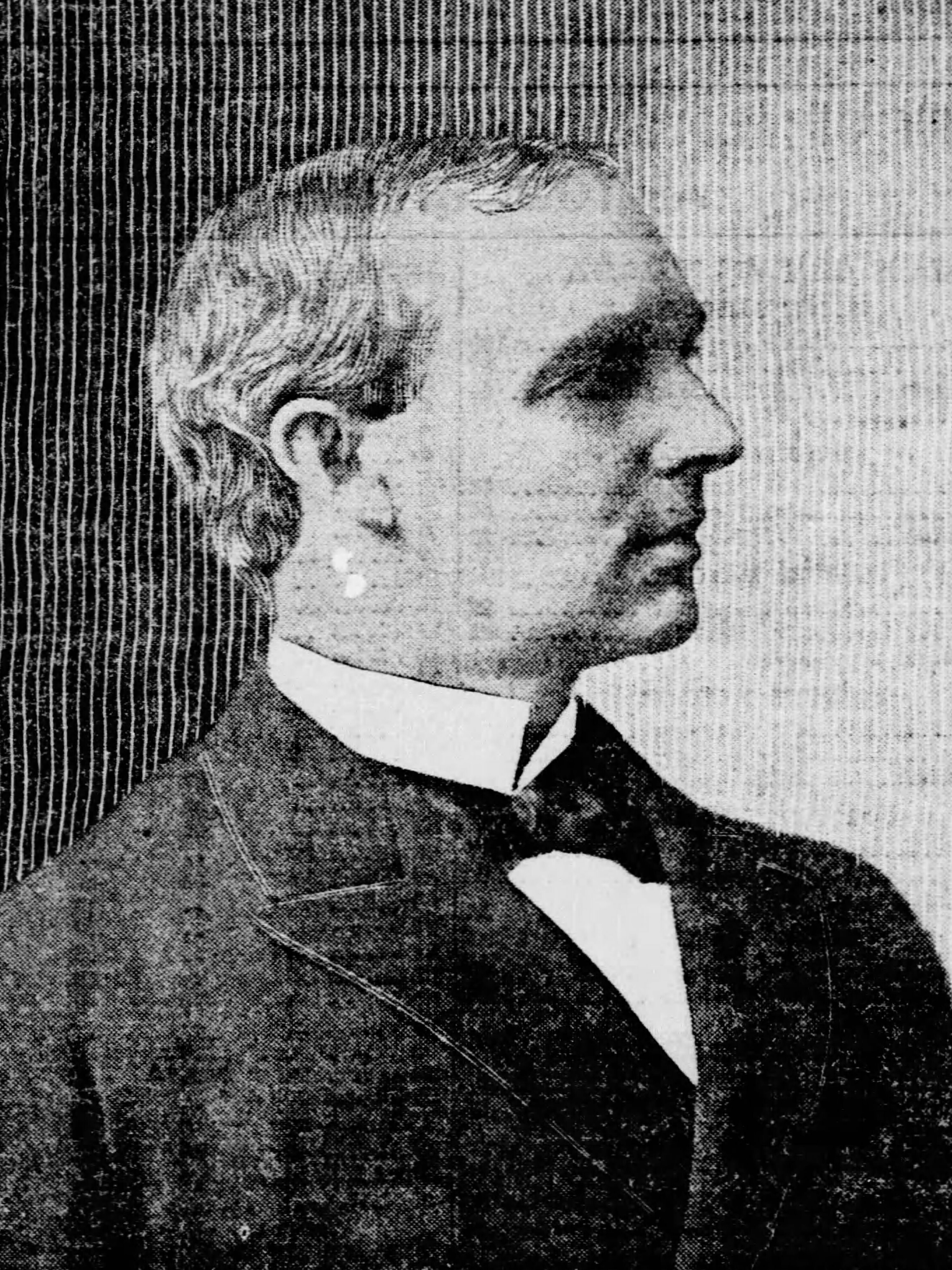

Judge of the Superior Court of Cook County
- In office January 1904 – December 1904
- Preceded by: Jonas Hutchinson

Judge of the Circuit Court of Illinois (Cook County)
- In office December 15, 1893 – 1903

Personal details
- Born: March 15, 1852 Wisconsin
- Died: December 24, 1925 (aged 73) Chicago, Illinois
- Party: Republican
- Spouse: Sarah Barton
- Children: Five daughters
- Profession: Lawyer, judge, politician

Elbridge Hanecy (March 15, 1852 – 1925) was an American lawyer and politician who served as a judge of both the Illinois Circuit Court for Cook County and the Superior Court of Cook County. He was the Republican nominee for mayor of Chicago in 1901, losing to incumbent Carter Harrison IV, and also unsuccessfully sought the Republican nomination for governor of Illinois in 1900.

== Early life, family, and education ==
Hanecy was born March 15, 1852, the son of William Hanecy and Mary Hanecy (née Wales). His parents had both moved to Wisconsin from their native state of Massachusetts two years before his birth. Hanecy's father died the year Hanecy was born. His father had, previously, served in the Mexican-American War as a non-commissioned officer, and had been a merchant in Springfield, Massachusetts. Upon moving to Wisconsin, he acquired land in Dodge County, Wisconsin, which he used for agriculture until his 1852 death. After being widowed by Hanecy's father, Hanecy's mother, Mary, remarried to Albert Littell, who served in the American Civil War, and died on his way home after the war.

He finished common school and academy, before studying law. His primary education was in Dodge County public schools, and supplemented by a course he took at the College of Milwaukee.

He was an Episcopalian and married in Chicago March 1st, 1876, to Sarah Barton and had 7 children.

== Career ==
=== Early career ===
Moving to Chicago in 1869, he accepted a position with Field, Leiter & Company, working as a dry goods clerk for them from 1869 until the Great Chicago Fire in 1871. After this, he briefly worked with John V. Farwell & Co.

=== Legal and judicial career ===
Hanecy turned to studying law. He was an apprentice at the firm Harvey, Anthony, and Galt. He was admitted to the bar on September 11, 1874, being admitted to practice law in Illinois. He practiced general law in Chicago. He practiced law alone until 1889, when he formed the partnership of Hanecy and Merrick with Georg P. Merrick.

He practiced general law with his partnership until he was elected a Judge on the Circuit Court of Illinois in Cook County in November 1893. He took office December 15, 1893. He was assigned the chancellor of the court in July 1895. He was reelected to the court for a six year term in June 1897, serving until his term expired in 1893. Thrice on the court, he was assigned to be the umpire of the board of arbitration, dealing with disputes between the bricklayers' and stonemasons' associations and their employers.

In January 1904, he was appointed to the Superior Court of Cook County for an unexpired term ending that December.

After leaving the bench, he returned to practicing law.

=== Political career ===
He was a prominent and active Republican.

He unsuccessfully sought the Republican nomination in the 1900 Illinois gubernatorial election, being defeated by Richard Yates Jr. at the state convention by a thin margin. Hanecy was politically allied with William Lorimer, being Lorimer's candidate the gubernatorial election.

He was the unsuccessful Republican nominee in the 1901 Chicago mayoral election, losing to incumbent Carter Harrison Jr. In his bid for the Republican nomination, and the general election, he was again supported by William Lorimer. Machine Republicans largely backed Hanecy for the nomination ahead of the city nominating convention.

== Personal life and death ==
Hanecy was an Episcopalian.

Hanecy married Sarah Barton on March 1, 1876. They had many children together.

Hanecy died in 1925.
