= 14th ward, Chicago =

Ward in Chicago

14 Ward - Chicago
- Ward
- Ward 14
- Current Chicago ward map, with 14th ward highlighted in red
- Country: United States
- State: Illinois
- County: Cook
- City: Chicago
- Established: 1863
- Communities: list

Government
  - Type: Ward
  - Body: Chicago City Council
  - Alderperson: Jeylú Gutiérrez (Democratic Party)

The 14th Ward is one of the 50 aldermanic wards with representation in the City Council of Chicago, Illinois.

== History ==
The ward was created on in 1863, when the number of wards in the city increased from ten to sixteen. In its initial map, its boundary lines were defined by North Avenue at the north, Lake Michigan at the east, Division Street at the south, and the North Branch of the Chicago River at the east.

== List of alders ==
=== Before 1923 ===
Aldermen					# Council	Aldermen				
Alderman	Term in office	Party	Notes	Cite	# Council	Alderman	Term in office	Party	Notes	Cite
Anton Hottinger	1863–1866				27th	Valentine Ruh	1863–1867			
Anton Hottinger	1863–1866				28th	Valentine Ruh	1863–1867			
Anton Hottinger	1863–1866				29th	Valentine Ruh	1863–1867			
Robert Engel	1866–1867				30th	Valentine Ruh	1863–1867			
Robert Engel	1866–1867				31st	Theodore Schintz	1867–1869			
Louis A. Berger	1868–1869		Redistricted to 17th ward in 1869		32nd	Theodore Schintz	1867–1869			
Louis A. Berger	1868–1869		Redistricted to 17th ward in 1869		33rd	Theodore Schintz	1867–1869			
Bolivar G. Gill	1869–1872				34th	P.B. Shiel	1869–1871			
Bolivar G. Gill	1869–1872				35th	P.B. Shiel	1869–1871			
Bolivar G. Gill	1869–1872				36th	S.E. Cleveland	1871–1876		Redistricted to 13th ward in 1876	
Bart Quirk	1872–1875				37th	S.E. Cleveland	1871–1876		Redistricted to 13th ward in 1876	
Bart Quirk	1872–1875				38th	S.E. Cleveland	1871–1876		Redistricted to 13th ward in 1876	
Bart Quirk	1872–1875				39th	S.E. Cleveland	1871–1876		Redistricted to 13th ward in 1876	
John Baumgarten	1876–1878				40th	Michael Ryan	1876–1879	Democratic	Redistricted from 15th ward	
John Baumgarten	1876–1878				41st	Michael Ryan	1876–1879	Democratic	Redistricted from 15th ward	
Frank A. Stauber	1878–1882	Democratic			42nd	Michael Ryan	1876–1879	Democratic	Redistricted from 15th ward	
Frank A. Stauber	1878–1882	Democratic			43rd	Reinhard Lorenz	1879–1881	Socialist Labor		
Frank A. Stauber	1878–1882	Democratic			44th	Reinhard Lorenz	1879–1881	Socialist Labor		
Frank A. Stauber	1878–1882	Democratic			45th	Hirsch Clemens	1881–1883	Republican		
Michael Ryan	1882–1886	Democratic			46th	Hirsch Clemens	1881–1883	Republican		
Michael Ryan	1882–1886	Democratic			47th	Franz Schack	1883–1887	Republican		
Michael Ryan	1882–1886	Democratic			48th	Franz Schack	1883–1887	Republican		
Michael Ryan	1882–1886	Democratic			49th	Franz Schack	1883–1887	Republican		
Daniel W. Ryan	1886–1888	Republican			50th	Franz Schack	1883–1887	Republican		
Daniel W. Ryan	1886–1888	Republican			51st	John C. Horn	1887–1888		Redistricted to 16th ward in 1888	
Herman Weinhardt	1888–1890				52nd	Andrew P. Johnson	1888–1889			
Herman Weinhardt	1888–1890				53rd	Phillip Jackson	1889–1893			
James Keats	1890–1896				54th	Phillip Jackson	1889–1893			
James Keats	1890–1896				55th	Phillip Jackson	1889–1893			
James Keats	1890–1896				56th	Phillip Jackson	1889–1893			
James Keats	1890–1896				57th	William L. Kamerling	1893–1895			
James Keats	1890–1896				58th	William L. Kamerling	1893–1895			
James Keats	1890–1896				59th	George A. Mugler	1895–1897			
Albert W. Beilfuss	1896–1901		Redistricted to 15th ward in 1901		60th	George A. Mugler	1895–1897			
Albert W. Beilfuss	1896–1901		Redistricted to 15th ward in 1901		61st	William Ziehn	1897–1899			
Albert W. Beilfuss	1896–1901		Redistricted to 15th ward in 1901		62nd	William Ziehn	1897–1899			
Albert W. Beilfuss	1896–1901		Redistricted to 15th ward in 1901		63rd	John N. Bos	1899–1901			
Albert W. Beilfuss	1896–1901		Redistricted to 15th ward in 1901		64th	John N. Bos	1899–1901			
William T. Maypole	1901–1908	Redistricted from 13th ward			65th	Frank T. Fowler	1901–1903	Republican	Redistricted from 13th ward	
William T. Maypole	1901–1908	Redistricted from 13th ward			66th	Frank T. Fowler	1901–1903	Republican	Redistricted from 13th ward	
William T. Maypole	1901–1908	Redistricted from 13th ward			67th	Daniel V. Harkin	1903–1907			
William T. Maypole	1901–1908	Redistricted from 13th ward			68th	Daniel V. Harkin	1903–1907			
William T. Maypole	1901–1908	Redistricted from 13th ward			69th	Daniel V. Harkin	1903–1907			
William T. Maypole	1901–1908	Redistricted from 13th ward			70th	Daniel V. Harkin	1903–1907			
William T. Maypole	1901–1908	Redistricted from 13th ward			71st	James H. Lawley	1907–1917			
Charles H. Lucas	1908–1912				72nd	James H. Lawley	1907–1917			
Charles H. Lucas	1908–1912				73rd	James H. Lawley	1907–1917			
Charles H. Lucas	1908–1912				74th	James H. Lawley	1907–1917			
Charles H. Lucas	1908–1912				75th	James H. Lawley	1907–1917			
J. Edward Clancy	1912–1914				76th	James H. Lawley	1907–1917			
J. Edward Clancy	1912–1914				77th	James H. Lawley	1907–1917			
Joseph H. Smith	1914–1923		Continued as an alderman after 1923, but redistricted to the 32nd ward		78th	James H. Lawley	1907–1917			
Joseph H. Smith	1914–1923		Continued as an alderman after 1923, but redistricted to the 32nd ward		79th	James H. Lawley	1907–1917			
Joseph H. Smith	1914–1923		Continued as an alderman after 1923, but redistricted to the 32nd ward		80th	James H. Lawley	1907–1917			
Joseph H. Smith	1914–1923		Continued as an alderman after 1923, but redistricted to the 32nd ward		81st	George M. Maypole	1917–1923	Democratic	Remained as alderman after 1923, but redistricted to 28th ward	
Joseph H. Smith	1914–1923		Continued as an alderman after 1923, but redistricted to the 32nd ward		82nd	George M. Maypole	1917–1923	Democratic	Remained as alderman after 1923, but redistricted to 28th ward	
Joseph H. Smith	1914–1923		Continued as an alderman after 1923, but redistricted to the 32nd ward		83rd	George M. Maypole	1917–1923	Democratic	Remained as alderman after 1923, but redistricted to 28th ward	
Joseph H. Smith	1914–1923		Continued as an alderman after 1923, but redistricted to the 32nd ward		84th	George M. Maypole	1917–1923	Democratic	Remained as alderman after 1923, but redistricted to 28th ward	
Joseph H. Smith	1914–1923		Continued as an alderman after 1923, but redistricted to the 32nd ward		85th	George M. Maypole	1917–1923	Democratic	Remained as alderman after 1923, but redistricted to 28th ward	
Joseph H. Smith	1914–1923		Continued as an alderman after 1923, but redistricted to the 32nd ward		86th	George M. Maypole	1917–1923	Democratic	Remained as alderman after 1923, but redistricted to 28th ward	

=== Since 1923 ===
No.	Alderperson	Term in office	Party	Notes
1	William R. O'Toole	April 16, 1923 – 1931	Democratic	Had been serving then-30th ward since 1914
2	Thomas J. O'Grady	1931 – 1933		
3	James J. McDermott	1933 – December 3, 1942	Democratic	Elected to Cook County Board of Appeals
4	Clarence P. Wagner	April 9, 1943 – July 10, 1953		Died in office
5	Joseph P. Burke	November 3, 1953 – May 11, 1968	Democratic	Died in office
6	Edward M. Burke	March 14, 1969 – May 15, 2023	Democratic	
7	Jeylú Gutiérrez	May 15, 2023 - Present	Democratic	
