= 1897 Chicago mayoral election =

- April 6, 1897
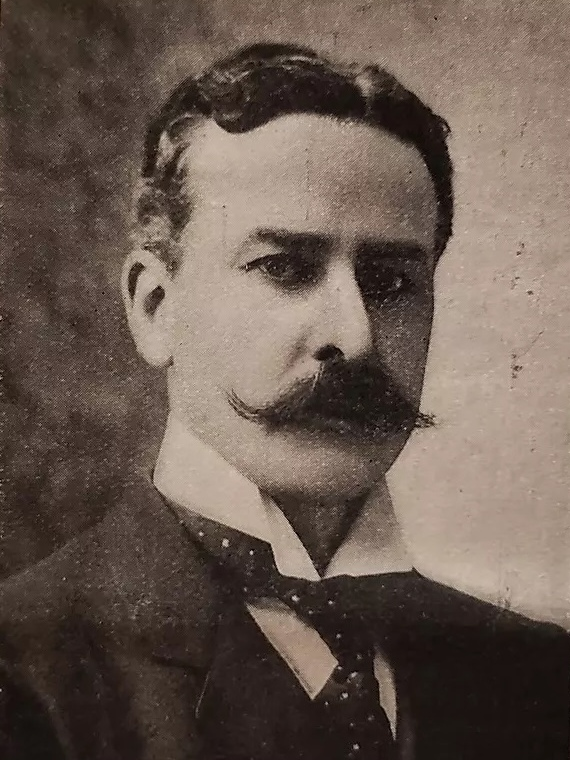

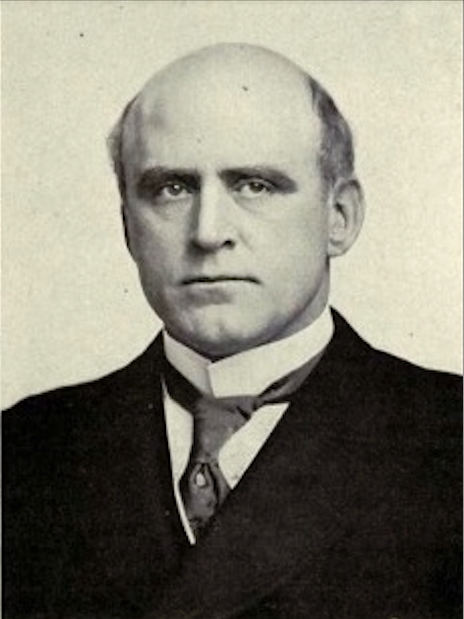

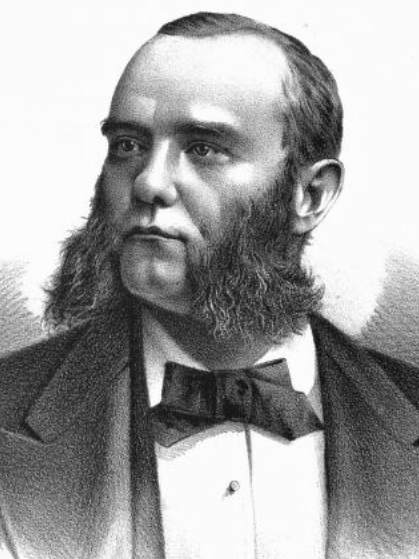
Nominee	Carter Harrison IV	John Maynard Harlan
Party	Democratic	Independent Republican
Popular vote	148,850	69,730
Percentage	50.23%	23.53%
Nominee	Nathaniel C. Sears	Washington Hesing
Party	Republican	Independent Democrat
Popular vote	59,513	15,427
Percentage	20.08%	5.21%
Mayor before election
George Bell Swift
Republican
Elected mayor
Carter Harrison IV
Democratic

In the Chicago mayoral election of 1897, Democratic nominee Carter Harrison IV was elected, winning a majority of the vote and defeating independent Republican John Maynard Harlan (an alderman), Republican nominee Nathaniel C. Sears, independent Democrat Washington Hesing (the former Chicago postmaster), as well as several minor candidates. Harrison carried a 26.7 point lead over second-place finisher Harlan, a margin greater than Harlan's vote share itself.

Incumbent Republican mayor George Bell Swift declined to seek reelection.

Harrison won the Democratic Party's nomination by acclamation at its city nominating convention, being unopposed after opponents for the nomination withdrew their candidacies, including Superior Court of Cook County Judge John Barton Payne and President of the Chicago Board of Education A. S. Trude. Sears secured the Republican Party nomination as a compromise candidate.

The election was held on April 6.

== Background ==
In November 1896, the Republican presidential ticket (headed by William McKinley) performed strongly in the city, receiving approximately 200,000 votes.

== Nominations ==
The election had held the record for being the Chicago mayoral election to have the most candidates running on the ballot for 122 years, until the 2019 Chicago mayoral election surpassed it.

=== Democratic ===
The Democratic nomination went to the Carter Harrison IV, son of the late former mayor Carter Harrison III (who had been assassinated in 1893 while serving his fifth term as mayor).

Considered to be young and charismatic, and the namesake of his popular father, in 1896 a number of political actors began to court Harrison as a potential mayoral candidate for 1897. In 1896 the Harrison Club, which had been founded by his father at the start of the decade in the hopes of forming the base of a political machine, but which had gone defunct following his father's assassination, was revived.

During his pursuit of the nomination, Harrison aligned himself with William Jennings Bryan, 1896 Democratic presidential nominee.

Harrison's potential candidacy began to accrue the backing of political players of the Chicago Democratic Party scene. Chief among these was Robert Emmett "Bobby" Burke, who abandoned his initial support for the candidacy of Superior Court of Cook County judge John Barton Payne in order to back Harrison.

John Barton Payne was broadly-liked, but did not arouse strong enthusiasm, and was criticized by some Democrats for his tepid support of William Jennings Bryan's presidential candidacy. Payne ultimately abandoned his plans to run after being discouraged by the greatly enthusiastic response which Harrison received for his opening speech at the January 8, 1897 Jackson Day Celebration.

Another challenger to Harrison was A. S. Trude. Trude, whose long political service had been admired by John Peter Altgeld, unsuccessfully sought Atgeld's endorsement. He ultimately withdrew as well.

Atgeld backed Harrison after Trude's withdrawal.

At the city's Democratic Party nominating convention, Harrison faced no open opposition. Harrison's former challenger Trude introduced Harrison's name for nomination by acclamation.

=== Republican ===
The Republican Party nominated Nathaniel C. Sears, a judge on the Superior Court of Cook County. Sears was the first resident of the Edgewater neighborhood to run for mayor. Sears was selected as a compromise candidate in an attempt to avoid a potentially divisive fight between the leading candidates that had sought the nomination (which included William Lorimer).

=== Prohibition ===
The Prohibition Party nominated H. L. Parmelee.

=== Socialist Labor ===
The Socialist Labor Party nominated John Glambeck. (Note: Many sources spell his surname "Glambock" instead of "Glambeck") Glambeck was a clerk and the editor of the Arbejderen paper, a mouthpiece of the party. Glambeck had been involved in the party, including having previously served as a delegate to the party's 1893 national convention.

=== Independent candidates ===
Incumbent alderman John Maynard Harlan ran for mayor as an independent Republican. Harlan was the son of then-sitting Associate Justice of the Supreme Court of the United States John Marshall Harlan.

Washington Hesing resigned his position as Chicago's postmaster to run for mayor as an independent Democrat.

Less notable candidates also running as independents were Frank Howard Collier and J. Irving Pearce Jr, the latter of whom was an independent Democrat.

== General election ==
The election was contentious, with four major candidates and numerous minor candidates.

The Chicago Traction Wars were a prominent concern in the election.

Throughout the election, Harrison was the apparent frontrunner. As a result, he received the most attacks from opponents. Opponents sought to paint him as a machine politician (which was true), as in the pocket of streetcar company (which was untrue), as an opponent of civil service reform (which was partially true), and as a "puppet" of Robert Burke and other career politicians (which was a fair criticism at the time). Reformists voiced alarm that the Democratic slate included William Loeffler as its City Clerk nominee.

Harrison's campaign was well organized, and benefited from the disunity of Republicans.

Appealing to citizen's concerns regarding the developments of the Chicago Traction Wars (particularly the Humphrey bills, bills backed by Charles Yerkes and introduced to the Illinois Senate by John Humphrey), John Maynard Harlan advocated for regulation of the city's streetcar systems. He supported municipal ownership of streetcars. He also supported civil service reform. Harlan received what effectively amounted to an unofficial endorsement from the Municipal Voters' League, which had endorsed against Harrison and urged that voters vote for whichever of the three other leading candidates (Harlan, Sears, Hessing) appeared to be in the strongest position to beat him come Election Day.

Hesing had begun preparing for his campaign in the autumn of 1896. He ran on a markedly liberal platform which proposed a mayoral administration modeled after that of Detroit mayor Hazen Pingree. Hesing advocated for civil service reform, an end to machine politics, traction law revision, and the use of vacant lots by the poor for the purposes of growing beans and vegetables. Despite his reformist platform, Hesing did not receive sizable backing from the city's reformers, who instead flocked to the candidacy of Harlan. However, very late in the campaign, Hesing did receive a lukewarm statement of support signed by a number of prominent gold standard-supporting Democrats.

By the end of the race, it had become apparent that Harrison and Harlan were the frontrunners to win.

Ahead of the election, outgoing mayor Swift ordered for the city to enforce state statutes that mandated all of the city's bars be closed on Election Day.

The second-place finish by Municipal Voters League reformer John Maynard Harlan evidenced the strength of the independent pro-reform vote in Chicago.

=== Endorsements ===
John Maynard Harlan (Independent Republican)

Officeholders

- William Kent, Chicago alderman from the 32nd ward
- Joseph Powell, Illinois state representative
- Charles Rector, Chicago alderman from the 28th ward

Individuals

- Jane Addams, activist and proprietor of Hull House
- Clarence Darrow, lawyer and activist
- Louis F. Post, Georgism activist
- Donald Richberg, attorney
Carter Harrison IV (Democratic)

Officeholders

- John Peter Altgeld, Governor of Illinois
- Robert Emmett "Bobby" Burke

Individuals

- Adolf Kraus

=== Results ===
Harrison won the election with a large margin-of-victory and an outright majority of votes.

The election marked the first for Chicago mayor since 1887 in which the runner-up was not the nominee of a major party. It was the first instance that this had been the case for the result of an election in which two major parties had put forth nominees since 1847. At the time, Sears' 20.08% vote share was the lowest that any Republican nominee had ever received for mayor of Chicago (beating the party's previous 28.83% low of the 1891 election). No Chicago mayoral nominee of the Republican Party would not see a worse vote share until 1935.

1897 Chicago mayoral election
Party	Candidate	Votes	%
Democratic	Carter Harrison IV	148,850	50.23
Independent Republican	John Maynard Harlan	69,730	23.53
Republican	Nathaniel C. Sears	59,513	20.08
Independent Democrat	Washington Hesing	15,427	5.21
Socialist Labor	John Glambeck	1,230	0.42
Prohibition	H. L. Parmelee	910	0.31
Independent	J. Irving Pearce, Jr.	561	0.19
Independent Democrat	Frank Howard Collier	110	0.04
Turnout		296,331	

Harrison received 82.91% of the Polish-American vote.
