= Chicago Traction Wars =

American municipal dispute

The Chicago Traction Wars was a political conflict which took place in Chicago primarily from the mid-1890s through the early 1910s. It concerned the franchise and ownership of streetcar lines. At the time it was one of the dominant political issues in the city and was a central issue of several mayoral elections and shaped the tenures of several mayors, particularly those of Carter Harrison IV and Edward Fitzsimmons Dunne.

== Background ==
Chicago awarded its first street railway franchises in 1856. Early on, dozens of streetcar companies arose. The first streetcars in Chicago were horse cars run by the Chicago City Railway Company and the North Chicago City Railway Company around 1858-1861. This method was slow and expensive, and the companies began substituting cable cars in the 1880s. It was also in the 1880s that electric-powered "trolleys" first became practical. However, by the 1890s mergers and acquisitions had left only a handful. These included:

- Chicago City Railway Company (around 1858-1861)
- North Chicago City Railway Company (around 1858-1861)
- Chicago and South Side Rapid Transit Railroad (providing service starting in 1892),
- Lake Street Elevated Railroad (providing service starting in 1893),
- Metropolitan West Side Elevated Railroad (providing service starting in 1895),
- Northwestern Elevated Railroad (providing service starting in 1900).
- Union Elevated Railroad (started by Yerkes but never actually operated service, created for the purpose of constructing the Loop)
- Union Consolidated Elevated Railroad (started by Yerkes but never actually operated service, created for the purpose of constructing the Loop)

=== 99-year franchise act ===
In the summer of 1863, the "Gridiron Bill" was proposed to extend the franchise of Chicago streetcar companies to 99 years. This generated outrage in Chicago, with large petitions and protests arising.

In January 1865, overriding a veto from Governor Richard Yates, the Illinois legislature passed the "Century Franchise", which had by then become known as the "99 years act"/ "99-year franchise act" which extended the franchise of streetcar companies to 99 years. There were strong doubts about the constitutionality of the legislation.

In 1883, to postpone a conflict, Chicago mayor Carter Harrison III brokered an understanding with streetcar companies that the city would extend their franchises for twenty more years, and settle the status of the 99 years act at another time.

== Yerkes-backed bills ==
Charles Yerkes, owner of a large number of the city's streetcar lines, began leading a push for extended franchises. Yerkes held great power and influence, at one point holding influence over a majority of the state legislature.

=== Crawford bill ===
On May 14, 1895, Governor John Peter Altgeld vetoed a bill to extend franchises which had been passed by the Illinois legislature. He declared "I love Chicago and am not willing to help forge a chain which would bind her people hand and foot for all time to the wheels of monopoly and leave them no escape."

=== Humphrey bills ===
In early 1897, legislator John Humphrey introduced several bills which would grant 50-year franchises with very little compensation to the city. The bills were defeated in the Illinois House of Representatives on May 12, 1897.

Newly-elected Chicago mayor Carter Harrison IV (the son of former mayor Carter Harrison III) had taken vigorous opposition to the bills, and successfully lobbied legislators to kill these bills. Ultimately, the traction wars would become a dominant concern of the young mayor's five terms in office.

Public opinion sided in opposition to a 50-year extension.

=== Passage of the Allen Law ===
After the defeat of the Humphrey bills, State Representative Charles Allen introduced a bill which would enable City Councils to grant 50-year franchises. It passed in both the Illinois Senate and Illinois House of Representatives on June 4, 1897 and was signed by Governor John Riley Tanner on June 9. After the bill was successfully passed, the arena of the conflict moved from the state legislature to the Chicago City Council.

=== City Council vote (Lyman Ordinance) ===
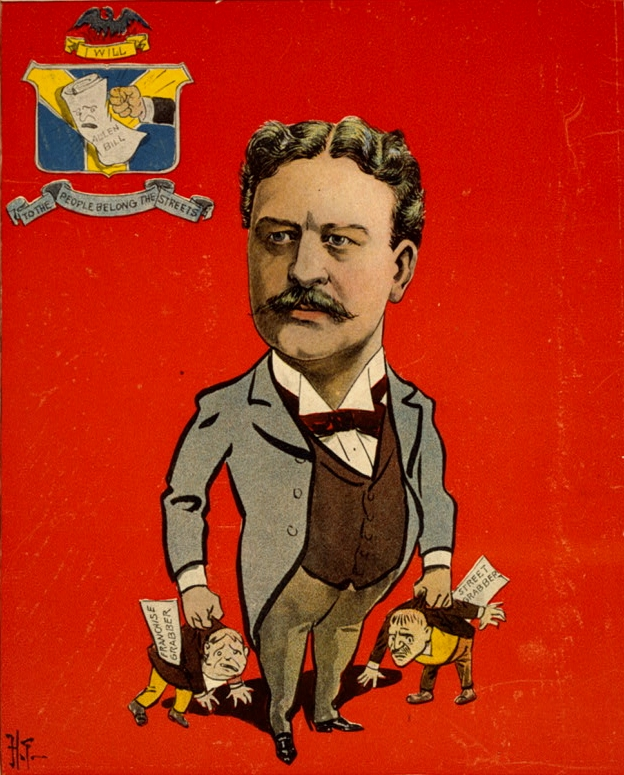
Caricature from 1899 showing Chicago mayor Carter Harrison, Jr. fighting against the "Allen bill"

The April 1898 Chicago aldermanic elections was seen as an opportunity shape the City Council's pending vote on the matter. The Municipal Voters' League requested that all candidates sign its platform, which contained a pledge to not vote for any franchise which exceeded twenty years or which did not provide the city with ample compensation. Of the twenty-nine candidates the league endorsed in the April Chicago aldermanic election, nineteen were elected. Additionally, another six elected alderman had signed the pledge despite not carrying the League's endorsement (as their seats were considered to be "safe" for reelection). It was believed that voters had elected a City Council that would oppose the Allen Law extensions, as 42 out of the 68 alderman were believed likely to cast votes against it.

On December 5, 1898, five months after the state passed the bill introduced by Allen, seven months after the aldermanic elections, and a month after state legislative elections had seemed to signal a death knell for the Allen Law, an ordinance was introduced to the Chicago City Council that would award 50-year franchises. The ordinance would extend all franchises that had been granted and enacted before July 1, 1897 fifty year extensions. It also specified a five cent fare for the first twenty years. It also specified considerably low compensation to the city by streetcar companies. This ordinance was introduced by 23rd Ward alderman William H. Lyman, and was dubbed the "Lyman Ordinance". This was, in essence, a last-ditch effort by the streetcar companies.

Harrison vowed to stop the ordinance, stating that, "If Yerkes can pass an ordinance over my veto I'll eat my old brown fedora".

The ordinance had the support of a number of the City Council's Gray Wolves. Harrison stopped the bill by "burying" it in a committee. Decisive roll call votes came from aldermen Michael Kenna and John Coughlin on December 19. The bill was sent first to the Committee of Streets and Alleys South, Streets and Alleys North, and Streets and Alleys West, where it remained until December 19, when it was withdrawn and instead referred to the Committee on City Hall. It was held by this committee until February 14, 1899, when in accordance with an unfavorable opinion on the bill issued by Corporation Council Granville W. Browning a majority report was created, which recommended that no legislation be enacted at the time. A minority report had been signed by William C. L. Zeiler and William Mangler recommending its passage.

Other ordinance were attempted. The minority report recommended the so-called "Kimbell ordinance", which would, among other things, extend franchises to December 31, 1946 and have a five cent fare for the first twenty years. The proposed "Hermann Ordinance" would extend franchises for twenty years, but thereafter allow the city to purchase, own and operate lines.

=== Repeal of the Allen Law ===
So strong was the public opinion against the Allen Law, the platforms of the conventions of all parties in Cook County, as well as many party conventions elsewhere in the state, included support for the repeal of the law. The two major parties' state conventions also passed resolutions calling for the repeal of the law. Again, as in the aldermanic elections earlier that year, the Municipal Voters' League requested all candidates sign their platform. Efforts were also undertaken in many legislative districts to block the renomination and reelection of members who had previously voted for the Humphrey bills and/or the Allen Law. So successful was this effort, that only 22 of the 114 members of the Illinois General Assembly that had voted for the Allen Law were reelected.

Not only was Harrison, like the majority of Chicagoans, opposed to the 50-year extension, but he also was opposed to accepting any franchise extension unless the Allen Law was repealed by the state legislature. This stance was seen as having paid off when the bill was repealed on March 7, 1899. Conceding defeat, Yerkes sold the majority of his Chicago transport stocks and moved to New York.

== Municipal ownership movement at the turn of the 20th century ==
A standoff emerged between the streetcar operators, still asserting their right to 99-year franchises, and Harrison's municipal government. The dispute between the city government and the companies would not be settled until 1907 after Harrison had already left office. Meanwhile, public frustration with this inaction began to grow.

At the same time, a new movement emerged in support of municipal ownership. Alongside a number of "progressive" causes, a movement for municipal ownership (Municipalization) had arisen in the United States. As a result, a movement arose in Chicago which sought to immediately pursue public social ownership of the streetcar lines, running them as a publicly owned enterprise/ public utility.

The influential Municipal Voters' League, which advocated on the traction issue, was founded in January 1896.

Mayor Harrison did not embrace the idea of municipal ownership, even after it had become supported by both major political parties by 1900.

Transit emerged as a central issue in municipal elections.

In 1897 John Maynard Harlan ran for mayor on a platform supporting municipal ownership.

When Carter Harrison IV had been reelected in 1899. One of his opponents had been former governor Altgeld, who ran under the "Municipal Ownership" party label on a platform which supported municipal ownership.

In 1902 a municipal ownership referendum passed by a six to one margin.

== Street Railway Commission ==
On December 18, 1899, the Chicago City Council passed a resolution enabling the appointment of a special committee of seven, subsequently referred to as the Street Railway Commission, to form a policy on the traction issue. This followed the "Harlan Committee", a commission which existed from 1897 through 1898, which was led by then-alderman John Maynard Harlan and which issued the "Harlan Report", a document that laid out facts about the issue but drew no policy conclusion.

Among other things, the committee was to examine the feasibility and practicality of municipal ownership, as well as the terms and conditions under which municipal ownership might exist.

On January 15, 1900, a resolution was adopted by the City Council further directing the commission to examine and report what companies, if any, were authorized under their charters to operate streetcars using anything other than animal power, the validity of ordinances granting such right in opposition to the charters of companies, the related provisions of the 99-year act, and what streetcar lines, if any, might be acquired the city by virtue of their ordinances.

The committee consisted William F. Brennan, Milton J. Foreman, Ernst F. Hermann, William Mavor, Walter J. Raymer, William E. Schlake.

The report was submitted on December 17, 1900. Among other things, it recommended that streetcar businesses be recognized and treated as a monopoly, that the City Council have broad powers of control over them, the creation of a new standing committee on local transportation, and that the city should have the power to own and operate street railways. It recommended holding referendums on important questions of street railway policy.

On May 20, 1901, the City Council passed an ordinance creating the Committee on Local Transportation. Some of the committee's special duties was "to carry on any work of investigation that may have been left uncompleted by the Street Railway Commission, to consider and devise plans for meeting the situation that may arise when street railway ordinances come up for action," and, "to make special study of the kind, quality, and sufficiency of the local transportation service and facilities of Chicago, and to make City Council from time to time, as it may see fit, recommendations looking to the improvement of the same." The committee would consist of nine City Council members, and the mayor as an ex-officio member. In its first report, issued December 11, 1901, it reported that the municipal ownership of street railways was not feasible.

== Mueller Law ==
In May 1903 the Illinois General Assembly passed the Mueller Law, which allowed cities to "own, construct, acquire, purchase, maintain, and operate street railways" through direct titles and leases, with the stipulation that cities must receive three-fifths approval from their electorate before assuming control of railways. The law also placed a 20-year limit on traction franchises and provided the right for municipalities to buy-out traction companies when their franchises expired. The law had been introduced by Illinois Senator Carl Mueller.

In an April 5, 1904 referendum, Chicago voters voted in strong enough support to allow the city to begin acquiring street railways, with voters approving the measure by a nearly a margin of 5-1. The city also simultaneously voted in support of two other municipal ownership-related referendums.

== 1905 municipal election ==
Mayor Harrison preferred to be pragmatic and negotiate with transit companies for better service instead of buying them out. However, this ran into opposition, particularly from hard-lined backers of immediate municipal ownership such as alderman William Emmett Dever. Dever attempted to pressure his fellow alderman to take a firm position on the issue of municipal ownership by sponsoring several traction reform legislation. In the fall of 1904, Dever proposed holding a referendum on whether the city should enact an immediate takeover of streetcar service. Harrison publicly killed Dever's referendum effort, stating, "The Dever ordinance is a war measure and should be withheld until all other means of settling the traction issue have failed."

Ultimately, three months after killing Dever's "war measure", with growing public dissatisfaction over his handling of the traction standoff and with labor unions disagreeing with his opposition towards immediate municipal ownership, Harrison decided to retire prior to the 1905 mayoral election.

Harrison persuaded the City Council to submit tentative transit ordinances for referendum during the 1905 municipal election. Ultimately, three propositions were placed on an advisory ballot related to transit.

On the question of whether City Council should pass the tentative ordinances, 150,785 voted "no" while only 64,391 voted "yes".

Voters also strongly (by a 3-1 margin) voted "no" on the question of whether the city should grant any franchise to the Chicago City Railway and the question of whether the City Council should grant a franchise to any rail company.

There was additionally a referendum on immediate municipal ownership in which voters sided in support of it.

Democrat Edward Fitzsimmons Dunne successfully ran to succeed Harrison, campaigning on a platform which advocated immediate municipal ownership. While his Republican opponent, John Manyard Harlan, had eight years earlier run as an independent Republican on a platform in support of municipal ownership, in 1905 he supported the tentative ordinances, preferring to delay municipal ownership until a time in which it would be more economically viable for the city.

== Plans proposed by Edward Fitzsimmons Dunne ==
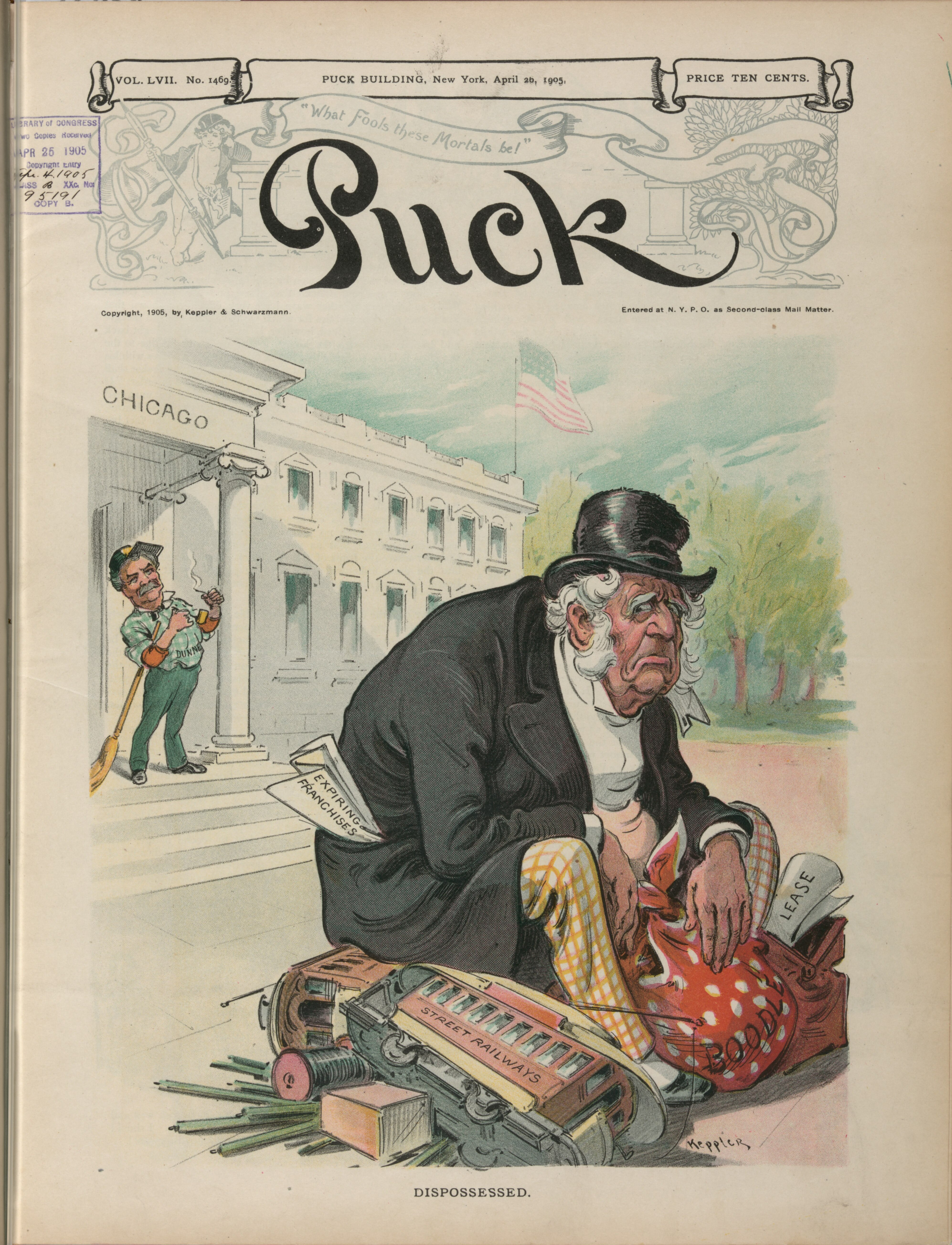
Cover of the April 25, 1905 edition of Puck, portraying newly-inaugurated mayor Dunne as dispossessing traction interests of their franchises

The main focus of Dunne's mayoralty would be on attempting to implement immediate municipal ownership. After assuming office, Dunne appointed Clarence Darrow as "Special Traction Counsel to the Mayor"

In June 1905, two months after taking office, Dunne put forth his proposed Contract Plan, under which a municipal contract would be given to a select group of private investors that would build and run a new transit city on behalf of the city. The trustees of this system would be granted a twenty-year franchise. This was voted down by the city council.

Dunne later presented an alternative plan, which also failed in the City Council.

In November 1905, Darrow resigned his position as Special Traction Counsel. In 1906, Dunne would appoint Walter L. Fisher as the city's new Special Traction Counsel.

After negotiations with streetcar companies, Fisher created the so-called Tentative Ordinance, which would see upgrades made to service, greater reimbursement made to the city for the use of streets, and stricter regulations. The plan, however, lacked any meaningful proposal for municipal purchase. Dunne, at first, touted this ordinance. However, after backlash from social reform allies of Dunne's and William Randolph Hearst's Independence League (which threatened that it might run a candidate against Dunne in the 1907 mayoral election), Dunne switched his position on the ordinance.

== April 1906 referendums ==
After the failure of the plan in city council, Dunne and his ally Dever both sought to present the plan to the voters by referendum. They along with the pro-municipal ownership lobby and William Randolph Hearst-owned media outlets were ultimately successful in urging the city council to consent to this.

The City Council granted approval to issue $75 million in certificates to fund acquisition of street railways. Such bonds were approved by voters in a referendum held that April. Dunne would ultimately subsequently struggle to arrange other financial and legal steps necessary to undertake acquisitions.

While voters successfully approved of municipal ownership of streetcars, a measure to allow the city to "proceed to operate street railways" by issuing Mueller bonds fell short of the required 60% support.

== Court rulings on 99-year franchise act ==
A standoff had emerged at the turn of the twentieth century between the railway companies, still asserting their right to 99 year franchises, and Chicago's municipal government. Ultimately, this standoff lasted several years, until court decisions nullified the 99-year act.

=== 1903 United States Circuit Court ===
A 1903 ruling by United States Seventh Circuit Court judge Peter S. Grosscup partially upheld the validity of the 99 year franchise act as it pertained to milage owned by the Union Traction Company.

=== 1905 United States Supreme Court ===
A 1905 ruling by the Supreme Court of the United States largely undermined the 99 franchise year act.

=== 1907 Illinois Supreme Court ===
In 1907 the Supreme Court of Illinois ruled that the 99-year franchise act was invalid.

== Settlement Ordinances of 1907 ==
In 1907, with Mayor Dunne struggling to pursue municipal ownership, the city council moved on without him and negotiated franchise extensions without Dunne's involvement.

In 1907 the Chicago City Council bared the fruits of their negotiations, passing the Settlement Ordinances of 1907. The ordinance would extend franchises by twenty years, but would provide the city the option to buy-up the streetcar lines for $50,000,000. It was, in essence, was a revised version of the Tentative Ordinance which Dunne had abandoned.

The ordinance would also impose a 5 cent fare on streetcars, universal transfers between lines, and would provide the city with 55% of the net profit earned by streetcar operators. It also established a Board of Supervising Engineers comprised engineers and accountants who were to be tasked with assuring compliance with the ordinances, and setting standards for equipment and construction.

While a Democratic city council had passed the Settlement Ordinances of 1907, Democratic mayor Dunne vetoed it, favoring immediate and outright municipal ownership. The city council overrode this veto. Dunne's traction counsel Walter L. Fisher, who had become disillusioned over the political feasibility of municipal ownership, had urged Dunne to accept the Settlement Ordinances. When Dunne refused, Fisher resigned.

Mayor Dunne ran for reelection in 1907, again on a platform of municipal ownership for the streetcar lines. However, he was defeated by Republican Fred A. Busse, who was in support of the Settlement Ordinances of 1907.

The ordinances were also put on the ballot during the 1907 municipal election and was approved by voters. The voters approved the ordinances by a vote of 167,367 to 134,281.

The Ordinances were implemented, with traction companies receiving 20-year franchises, post-dated as beginning on February 11, 1907.

=== 1909 Burnham Transit Plan ===
In 1909 the Burnham Transit Plan (part of the Burnham Plan of Chicago) formally outlined a plan for the city's rail and streetcar systems.

=== 1910 reorganization of routes ===
Through routes over the lines of several companies were established in 1910 creating a number of joint services.

== Unification Ordinance of 1913 ==
The Unification Ordinance of 1913 was passed by the Chicago City Council on November 13, 1913. It combined management and operations of all Chicago streetcar companies as the Chicago Surface Lines (C.S.L.). It took effect in 1914. Companies such as the Chicago City Railway became "paper companies", continuing to own equipment, but with their equipment being operated by the C.S.L. and used systemwide throughout the metropolitan area. As a result, Chicago now had the largest street railway system, the longest one-fare ride, the longest average ride, and the most liberal transfer privileges in the world.

In 1913, the city's elevated lines also joined into a loose association.

== Subsequent failed schemes ==
=== CLTC plan ===
In early 1916 the Chicago City Council created a commission of three engineers called the Chicago Traction and Subway Commission to assess the city's transit network and plan improvements. In a comprehensive plan released later that year, the commission suggested that the city council create a municipally run transit corporation to buy out private transit carriers and improve the network.

After two years of inaction, in 1918 the City Council passed legislation to create the Chicago Local Transit Company (CLTC). The CLTC board was to have a number of members appointed by the City Council. The CLTC was to oversee consolidation of all elevates and surface transit lines under a singular management and begin work on expansions proposed by the commission. Meanwhile. The City of Chicago was to construct the downtown subway proposed by the commission and rent it to the CLTC.

Mayor William Hale Thompson opposed the CLTC plan and vetoed its ordinance. The City Council overrode his veto to send the ordinance to the voters in a referendum.

Initially, in August, it had seemed likely that the referendum would pass. It had backing from most of City Council, five of the city's six daily newspapers, and a majority of the city's business community. However, by October its chances had begun to decrease. Hard line municipal ownership backers had found the plan insufficient and started opposition to it. They criticized the plan for failing to guarantee that the city would permanently have control over the CLTC board. They also criticized the price tag given to the acquisition of the existing lines ($149 million for Chicago Surface Lines and $71 million for elevated lines), and argued that it would potentially require service cuts and price hikes to pay-off. Soon after, an anti-ordinance coalition followed led by individuals such as former mayors Harrison and Dunne. Labor unions joined the opposition, as did a few business groups.

In November, voters rejected the CLTC ordinance by 53 to 47%.

=== Schwartz plan ===
In February 1922, Alderman Ulysses S. Schwartz proposed a scheme in which the city would raise funds to buy-out transit companies by selling public utility certificate bonds backed by the assets and income of the transit properties to be acquired. No taxes would be raised and the city's transit fund would be left untouched in this scheme.

=== Metropolitan Transit District plan ===
Mayor Thompson proposed the creation of a regional transportation authority in his Metropolitan Transit District Plan. Thompson was unable to get state enabling legislation, dooming his proposal.

=== Dever mayoralty ===
In 1916 the Chicago Traction and Subway Commission put forth plans for a "Unified System of Surface, Elevated and Subway Lines in the Loop"

In the 1923 Chicago mayoral election Democratic candidate William Emmett Dever proclaimed that the most critical task for the victor of the election would be to resolve problems with the city's public transit. These problems included price increases and declining quality of service provided by the Chicago Surface Lines. A long time advocate for municipal ownership, Dever believed that it would be ideal for the city to buy-out the Chicago Surface Lines once their franchise expired in 1927. His opponent Arthur C. Lueder promised to study the possibility of municipal ownership.

Dever ultimately won the 1923 election. After becoming mayor, Dever began negotiations for the city to acquire both the Chicago Surface Lines and the Chicago Rapid Transit Company. Dever resurrected Schwartz's proposal, incorporating its certificate bond plan into his own proposal he presented in June 1923. He began to negotiate the acquisition of private carriers, however, the city and carrier companies again could not agree on a price of acquisition. This was exacerbated by the fact that the debt-plagued Chicago Surface Lines was being managed by a consortium of various financiers. The city had to directly deal with these financiers, who gave a cost of $162 million based upon the formula of the 1907 Settlement law. Negotiations with Samuel Insull, the effective owner of the elevated rail, about acquiring the elevated lines were also complicated.

By 1924, Dever began to explore other possible routes to create a municipal rail service. One was to use the roughly $40-million in the city's transit fund and build a new, separate, system with a subway and several surface lines feeding into it. This idea had come from the William Randolph Hearst papers, who had pushed for such a municipal system to be built in Chicago. By autumn of 1924, however, Dever abandoned his consideration of building a new municipal system. He felt having a third actor in the city's transit network would only prolong future municipal acquisition and unification of its system rather than hasten it.

Dever next publicly proposed comprehensive municipal ownership, with Schwartz's certificate plan being utilized to finance such a purchase. The only area of disagreement between the city and the companies was the price to be paid for acquisition. Once this disagreement was settled, unified municipal transit would be possible. However he still warned, "If...it becomes clear that a settlement cannot be brought on that basis because the persons holding the securities of private companies cannot agree with the city on a fair price, then it seems to me the (solution) is the immediate building by the city of a rapid transit system."

A battle ensued between Insull and Dever.

Dever put his transit plan to a referendum vote on February 24, 1925. His proposed ordinance was defeated heavily at the polls.

On February 27, 1925 the City Council voted 40 to 5 in support of an ordinance that included both the acquisition of existing transit facilities and for the city to construct new transit facilities. This ordinance also would create a municipal railway board. The ordinance, along with a separate question on whether the city (through the new municipal railway board) should operate the transit facilities, was put to a vote on April 8. The ordinance itself was defeated by 333,758 to 227,033. The question on whether the city should operate the facilities saw a "no" victory by a vote of 333,190 to 225,406.

Dever was unable to follow through with any of his plans. He changed his focus to the issue of crime which preoccupied the rest of his mayoralty. Dever lost reelection in 1927.

In the 1927 Republican mayoral primary Edward R. Litsinger had unsuccessfully run on a platform which, in part, promised to bring an end to the Chicago Traction Wars by mandating a board of control and the consolidation for all transportation lines.

== Later developments ==
In the late-1930s, the Chicago City Council's Transportation Committee, led by alderman James R. Quinn, negotiated with transit companies about possible acquisitions of them by the city, with hope being held that the city might be able to procure Public Works Administration funding to purchase and consolidate transit lines.

The Chicago Surface Lines was eventually sold to the publicly owned, city government agency Chicago Transit Authority after 88 years of private operations and 34 years since consolidation, on April 22, 1947, and the Chicago City Railway was liquidated on February 15, 1950.

== See also ==
- History of Chicago
- Politics of Chicago
- Transportation in Chicago
- Cleveland Traction Wars
