= Committeepeople (Cook County, Illinois) =

Political party in Illinois

Ward Committeepeople and Township Committeepeople are political party officials who serve many standard committeemen duties on behalf of their political party in Cook County, Illinois.

== Structure and election ==
The city of Chicago, the largest municipality in Cook County, elects committeepeople (known as "committeemen" until 2018) from each of its 50 wards. Each of the 30 suburban civil townships in Cook County also elect committeepeople from each township. Each established party in Cook County, currently Democrats, Republicans and Libertarians, elects its own committeeperson.

Elections for Chicago ward committeepeople coincide with the primaries for presidential candidates, while elections for township committeepeople coincide with primaries for gubernatorial candidates.

== Roles ==
The positions are unpaid, with responsibilities that include voter registration, community forums, election materials, and election operations. In Chicago, the committeepeople are responsible for producing smooth political processes during the elections in their wards, which includes attempting to produce high voter turnout.

Committeepeople are voting members in the political organization of their party in the County. This role gives them authority on behalf of the party to select replacements for some vacated political posts such as United States Representative and state legislators. Replacements for some other vacancies are selected through other processes: vacated United States Senate posts are appointed by the Illinois Governor and vacated Chicago City Council posts are appointed by the Mayor of Chicago.

Operationally in Chicago, the committeeperson plays an important role in ward politics. The post of alderman and committeeperson are often closely linked: sometimes the former controls the latter and sometimes the same person holds both posts. In many cases, the committeeman also has influence over the doling out of jobs, favors, and services around the ward. Sometimes a committeeperson accumulates sufficient influence to place their loyalists into political positions outside of the ward. However, in recent years, the position has lost its power and luster due to the decline in patronage hiring in local Illinois government.

== Cook County Democratic Party ==
As of August 2025.

Constituency (ward or township)	Name	Start	Other Office(s) Held
1st Ward	Laura Yepez	2024	None
2nd Ward	Tim Egan	2016	None
3rd Ward	Pat Dowell	2008	Member of the Chicago City Council (2007–present)
4th Ward	Toni Preckwinkle	1992	Chair of the Cook County Democratic Party (2018–present); President of the Cook County Board of Commissioners (2010–present); Member of the Chicago City Council (1991–2010)
5th Ward	Leslie Hairston	2000	Member of the Chicago City Council (1999–2023)
6th Ward	Elgie Sims	2024	Member of the Illinois Senate (2018–present); Member of the Illinois House of Representatives (2012–2018)
7th Ward	Greg Mitchell	2016	Member of the Chicago City Council (2015–present)
8th Ward	Michelle Harris	2008	Member of the Chicago City Council (2006–present)
9th Ward	Anthony Beale	2000	Member of the Chicago City Council (1999–present)
10th Ward	Peter Chico	2024	Member of the Chicago City Council (2023–present)
11th Ward	John Daley	1980	Member of the Cook County Board of Commissioners (1992–present); Member of the Illinois Senate (1989–1992); Member of the Illinois House of Representatives (1985–1989)
12th Ward	Theresa Mah	2024	Member of the Illinois House of Representatives (2017–present)
13th Ward	Marty Quinn	2024	Member of the Chicago City Council (2011–present)
14th Ward	Aarón Ortíz	2020	Member of the Illinois House of Representatives (2019–present)
15th Ward	Ray Lopez	2012	Member of the Chicago City Council (2015–present)
16th Ward	Stephanie Coleman	2016	Member of the Chicago City Council (2019–present)
17th Ward	David Moore	2016	Member of the Chicago City Council (2015–present)
18th Ward	Derrick Curtis	2016	Member of the Chicago City Council (2015–present)
19th Ward	Matt O'Shea	2012	Member of the Chicago City Council (2011–present)
20th Ward	Mattie Hunter	2020	Member of the Illinois Senate (2003–present)
21st Ward	Howard Brookins	2004	Member of the Chicago City Council (2003–2023)
22nd Ward	Mike Rodriguez	2016	Member of the Chicago City Council (2019–present)
23rd Ward	Silvana Tabares	2020	Member of the Chicago City Council (2018–present); Member of the Illinois House of Representatives (2013–2018)
24th Ward	Monique Scott	2024	Member of the Chicago City Council (2022–present)
25th Ward	Byron Sigcho-Lopez	2020	Member of the Chicago City Council (2019–present)
26th Ward	Jessie Fuentes	2024	Member of the Chicago City Council (2023–present)
27th Ward	Walter Burnett	2013	Vice Mayor of Chicago (2023–2025); Member of the Chicago City Council (1995–2025)
28th Ward	Jason Ervin	2012	Member of the Chicago City Council (2011–present)
29th Ward	Chris Taliaferro	2016	Member of the Chicago City Council (2015–present)
30th Ward	Ruth Cruz	2024	Member of the Chicago City Council (2023–present)
31st Ward	Felix Cardona	2020	Member of the Chicago City Council (2019–present)
32nd Ward	Scott Waguespack	2012	Member of the Chicago City Council (2007–present)
33nd Ward	Rossana Rodríguez	2024	Member of the Chicago City Council (2019–present)
34th Ward	Bill Conway	2024	Member of the Chicago City Council (2023–present)
35th Ward	Carlos Ramirez-Rosa	2022	General Superintendent and CEO of the Chicago Park District (2025–present); Member of the Chicago City Council (2015–2025)
36th Ward	Gil Villegas	2020	Member of the Chicago City Council (2015–present)
37th Ward	Emma Mitts	2004	Member of the Chicago City Council (2000–present)
38th Ward	Rob Martwick	2017	Member of the Illinois Senate (2019–present); Member of the Illinois House of Representatives (2013–2019)
39th Ward	Ram Villivalam	2019	Member of the Illinois Senate (2019–present)
40th Ward	Maggie O'Keefe	2020	None
41st Ward	John Hanley	2024	None
42nd Ward	Brendan Reilly	2008	President pro tempore of the Chicago City Council (2019–2023); Vice Mayor of Chicago (2015–2019); Member of the Chicago City Council (2007–present)
43rd Ward	Lucy Moog	2016	None
44th Ward	Bennett Lawson	2024	Member of the Chicago City Council (2023–present)
45th Ward	Michael Rabbitt	2024	None
46th Ward	Sean Tenner	2018	None
47th Ward	Paul Rosenfeld	2015	None
48th Ward	Leni Manaa-Hoppenworth	2024	Member of the Chicago City Council (2023–present)
49th Ward	Kelly Cassidy	2019	Member of the Illinois House of Representatives (2011–present)
50th Ward	Bruce Leon	2024	None
Barrington Township	Robert Steffen		Member of the Illinois Property Tax Appeal Board
Berwyn Township	Robert Lovero		Mayor of Berwyn
Bloom Township	Monica Gordon		Cook County Clerk (2024–present)
Bremen Township	Vernard Alsberry		Hazelcrest Village President
Calumet Township	Bob Rita		Member of the Illinois House of Representatives (2003–present)
Cicero Township	Larry Dominick		
Elk Grove Township	Ted Mason		None
Evanston	Daniel Biss	2024	Mayor of Evanston (2021-present); Member of the Illinois House of Representatives (2011-2013); Member of the Illinois Senate (2013-2019)
Hanover Township	Adriana Barriga-Green		
Lemont Township	Kevin Ameriks		
Leyden Township	Barrett Pedersen		Mayor of Franklin Park
Lyons Township	Steven Landek		Member of the Illinois Senate (2011–present)
Maine Township	Laura Murphy		Member of the Illinois Senate (2015–present)
New Trier Township	Dean Maragos		None
Niles Township	Josina Morita		
Northfield Township	Tracy Katz Muhl		None
Norwood Park Township	Frank Avino		None
Oak Park Township	Don Harmon		President of the Illinois Senate (2020–present); President pro tempore of the Illinois Senate (2011–2019); Member of the Illinois Senate (2003–present)
Orland Township	Beth McElroy Kirkwood		
Palatine Township	Maria Galo		None
Palos Township	James Gleffe		None
Proviso Township	Chris Welch		Speaker of the Illinois House of Representatives (2021–present); Member of the Illinois House of Representatives (2013–present)
Rich Township	Calvin Jordan		Rich Township Highway Inspector, Trustee of Rich Township Schools, and member of Village of Hazel Crest Economic Development Board
River Forest Township	Cathy Adduci		
Riverside Township	Micheal Zalewski		Member of the Illinois House of Representatives (2008–2023)
Schaumburg Township	Mike Cudzik		None
Stickney Township	Vincent Cainkar		None
Thornton Township	Napoleon Harris		Member of the Illinois Senate (2013–present)
Wheeling Township	Mark Walker		Member of the Illinois House of Representatives (2019–present, 2009–2011)
Worth Township	Patricia Murphy		None

== Cook County Republican Party ==
As of December 2024.

Constituency (ward or township)	Name	Start	Other Office(s) Held
1st Ward	Vacant		
2nd Ward	CJ Gallo	2024	None
3rd Ward	Alan Rasho	2024	
4th Ward	Paul McKinley	2024	None
5th Ward	Tyler Shasteen	2024	
6th Ward	Charles Earl Williams	2024	
7th Ward	Dave Lottich	2024	
8th Ward	Lynn Franco		None
9th Ward	Wayland Johnson		None
10th Ward	Yolanda Deanda	2024	
11th Ward	Vacant	—N/a	—N/a
12th Ward	Vacant		None
13th Ward	Horacio Aguilera	2024	
14th Ward	Vacant	—N/a	—N/a
15th Ward	Rosa Pritchett		None
16th Ward	Leonard Griffin	2024	
17th Ward	Vacant	—N/a	—N/a
18th Ward	Devin Jones	2020	
19th Ward	Declan Smith	2024	None
20th Ward	Maurissa Langon	2024	
21st Ward	Ronald Fields	2024	
22nd Ward	Lupe Castillo	2024	
23rd Ward	Carlos Alvarez	2024	
24th Ward	Steven Valtierra	2024	
25th Ward	Vacant		
26th Ward	Vacant		
27th Ward	Steve Boulton	2024	Former Chair of the Chicago Republican Party
28th Ward	Tamiko Holt	2024	
29th Ward	Walter Adamczyk		
30th Ward	Edward Karecki		
31st Ward	Ramona Bonilla-Anaiel		
32nd Ward	Cairy Littlejohn	2024	
33rd Ward	Jason Proctor	2024	
34th Ward	Christopher Myers	2024	
35th Ward	Gladys Tanchez	2024	
36th Ward	Vacant	—N/a	—N/a
37th Ward	Velda Brunner	2024	
38th Ward	Chuck Hernandez		Chair of the Chicago Republican Party
39th Ward	Barry Bebart		
40th Ward	Gigi Gavron	2024	None
41st Ward	Ammie Kessem		
42nd Ward	Kurt Fujio	2024	
43rd Ward	Brian Kasal		
44th Ward	Laura Kotelman		
45th Ward	Estela Richards	2024	
46th Ward	Evan Kasal	2024	
47th Ward	Gary Mandell	2024	
48th Ward	Beth Ruegg	2024	
49th Ward	James Hazard		
50th Ward	Daniel Kelley	2024	
Barrington Township	Peter Kopsaftis	2020	None
Berwyn Township	Vacant		
Bloom Township	Lisa Kristina		
Bremen Township	Max Solomon		None
Calumet Township	Vacant	—N/a	—N/a
Cicero Township	Sandra Tomschin		None
Elk Grove Township	Ed Lapinski		None
Evanston	Sean Matlis		None
Hanover Township	Michael Baumer		Streamwood Village Trustee
Lemont Township	Michael Shackel		Lemont Township Trustee
Leyden Township	Brad Stephens		Member of the Illinois House of Representatives (2019–present); Village President of Rosemont (2007–present)
Lyons Township	Terry Carr		None
Maine Township	Jim Stinson		
New Trier Township	Julie Cho		None
Niles Township	Mark Albers	2024	None
Northfield Township	T. J. Brown		None
Norwood Park Township	George Ballis		None
Oak Park Township	John Bergholz		None
Orland Township	Cindy Nelson Katsenes		None
Palatine Township	Aaron Del Mar		Palatine Township Highway Commissioner
Palos Township	Sean Morrison		Chair of the Cook County Republican Party (2016–present); Member of the Cook County Board of Commissioners (2015–present)
Proviso Township	Mike Corrigan		None
Rich Township	Eric Wallace		None
River Forest Township	Tom Cronin		None
Riverside Township	Jay Reyes		None
Schaumburg Township	Joeseph Folisi		None
Stickney Township	Natasa Dzolic		Member of Stickney, Illinois Parks & Recreation Advisory Commission
Thornton Township	Tim DeYoung		
Wheeling Township	Kathy Penner		Wheeling Township Supervisor
Worth Township	Shaun Murphy		None
