= 1871 Chicago aldermanic election =

- November 7, 1871

20 (of 40) seats on the Chicago Common Council 21 seats needed for a majority
Alliance	Union–Fireproof	People's	others
Seats won	14	5	1
Popular vote	13,438	6,255	2,315
Vote %	61.06%	28.42%	10.52%

The 1871 Chicago aldermanic election was held on November 7, 1871, to elect half of the membership of the Chicago Common Council (city council). The election was held only one month after the Great Chicago Fire. Due to the exceptional challenges that city was facing as a result of the fire, a unity ticket dubbed "Union–Fireproof" was nominated by the party committees of the county Democratic and Republican parties for the November 1871 Chicago and Cook County elections. The main opposition to this ticket was a second unity ticket dubbed People's", which was nominated by "sorehead" members of the county Democratic and Republican parties.

The election resulted in a landslide victory for Union–Fireproof ticket, which won 14 seats. The People's ticket won only 5 seats, while a single seat was won by an independent candidate.

== Background ==
Half of the seats on the Chicago Common Council (today known as a "Chicago City Council") were up for election in the 1871 election. At the time, each ward had two seats, which were elected for two-year terms (with the two seats in each ward having their elections scheduled manner that allowed for a council election each year in every ward).

Due to the exceptional circumstances of the election, taking place the month following the Great Chicago Fire, the central committees of the county's Republican and Democratic parties formed a joint "Union–Fireproof" unity ticket for the city and county elections. The agreement to form a joint ticket had been spearheaded by a group of Chicago businessmen and civic leaders, led by Carter Harrison III. The ticket was a liberal and government reform-supporting one. Joseph Medill was drafted to run as its nominee in the mayoral election.

After the "Union–Fireproof" ticket was jointly by each major party's central committees, so-called "sorehead" members of both parties (who were non-supportive of the ticket that was formed) still convened the party's nominating conventions out of which they together jointly selected nominees for the so-called "People's Ticket" that was fielded to run in opposition to the Union–Fireproof ticket in city and county elections.

== Results ==
Among those elected to the council was Lester L. Bond, a former alderman who at the time of the election was filling the duties of mayor on an acting basis. Monroe Heath (a future mayor) was among the newly elected aldermen. Also among the newly elected aldermen was Edward Cullerton, who would go on to serve a significant decades-long tenure on the council (beginning a Cullerton family political dynasty that extended into the 21st century).

Seven of the elected aldermen were members of the Democratic Party, providing the Democrats with an increased representation on the council. However, Republicans still held two-thirds of council seats.

Chicago Common Council results
Ward	Union–Fireproof nominee				People's ticket nominee				Other candidates				Total votes	Alderman before	Elected alderman
Ward	Name	Party	Vote total	Vote %	Name	Party	Vote total	Vote %	Name	Party	Vote total	Vote %	Total votes	Alderman before	Elected alderman
1st	Chauncey T. Bowen		643	90.95	Jacob Becker		64	9.05	—N/a				707	Richard Sommers	Chauncey T. Bowen (Republican/Fireproof)
2nd	Arthur Dixon (incumbent)	Republican	990	100	—N/a				—N/a				990	Arthur Dixon (Republican/Fireproof) incumbent re-elected	
3rd	John W. McGinniss		1,216	73.74	Joseph A. Montgomery (incumbent)	Democratic	188	11.40	A. B. Sheldon		245	14.86	1,649	Joseph A. Montgomery (Democratic/People's)	John W. McGenniss (Fireproof)
4th	John H. McAvoy (incumbent)		1,489	97.64	Moses A. Thayer		36	2.36	—N/a				1,525	John H. McAvoy (Fireproof) incumbent re-elected	
5th	R. B. Stone		563	66.00	Moore Conger		290	34.00	—N/a				853	George S. Whitaker	R. B. Stone (Fireproof)
6th	Phillip Ready		678	49.34	William Tracy		696	50.66	—N/a				1,374	David Walsh	William Tracy (People's)
7th	William Raleigh		344	32.61	Edward Cullerton	Democratic	415	39.34	Patrick McClowry		296	28.06	1,055	William Batterman	Edward Cullerton (Democratic/People's)
8th	Jeremiah Clowry		702	53.67	Philip Moser		271	20.72	W. S. Powell		335	25.61	1,308	William S. Powell	Jeremiah Clowry (Fireproof)
9th	James McMullen		680	33.63	George Powell (incumbent)		792	39.17	Patrick Rafferty		550	27.20	2,022	George Powell (People's) incumbent re-elected	
10th	Lester L. Bond	Republican	891	68.33	Alonzo Snider		413	31.67	—N/a				1,304	Thomas Wilco	Lester L. Bond (Republican/Fireproof)
11th	Henry Sweet		530	41.28	James Walsh (incumbent)		470	36.60	C.F. Periolat		284	22.12	1,284	James Walsh (People's)	Henry Sweet (Fireproof)
12th	Monroe Heath	Republican	1,250	100	—N/a								1,250	Samuel McCotter	Monroe Heath (Republican/Fireproof)
13th	George W. Sherwood		663	53.21	James L. Campbell (incumbent)	Republican	583	46.79	—N/a				1,246	James L. Campbell (Republican/People's)	George W. Sherwood (Fireproof)
14th	S. Ezra Cleveland		618	72.45	Jane Pyne		126	14.77	Thomas McNamara		109	12.78	853	P.B. Shiel	S. Ezra Cleveland (Fireproof)
15th	J. Vant Woud		543	35.87	James J. McGrath (incumbent)		971	64.13	—N/a				1,514	James J. McGrath (People's) incumbent re-elected	
16th	Thomas A. Stout		559	68.42	Brice A. Miller		258	31.58	—N/a				817	David A. Walsh	Thomas A. Stout (Fireproof)
17th	George Adolph Misch		64	12.60	—N/a				Jacob Lengacher		365	71.85	508		Jacob Lengacher
17th	George Adolph Misch		64	12.60	—N/a				A.D. Skinner		79	15.55	508		Jacob Lengacher
18th	Owen McCarthy		190	24.27	Thomas Carney (incumbent)		593	75.73	—N/a				783	Thomas Carney (People's) incumbent re-elected	
19th	Mahlon D. Ogden		310	87.32	James McCauley (incumbent)		45	12.68	—N/a				355	James McCauley	Mahlon D. Ogden (Fireproof)
20th	Charles L. Woodman		515	84.29	Philip A. Hoyne		44	7.20	Thomas D. Reilly		52	8.51	611	M.A. Devine	
Totals	Union–Fireproof total (14 seats won)		13,438	61.06	People's ticket total (5 seats won)		6,255	28.42	Other candidates total (1 seat won)		2,315	10.52	22,008		
