= 1977 Chicago mayoral special election =

- June 7, 1977
- Turnout: 40% ▼7.3 pp
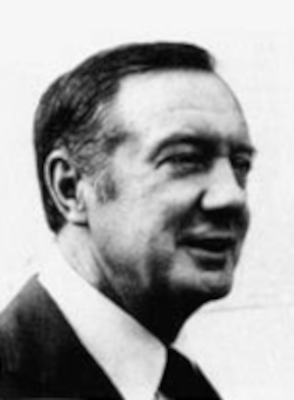

Nominee	Michael A. Bilandic	Dennis H. Block
Party	Democratic	Republican
Popular vote	490,688	135,282
Percentage	77.3%	21.3%
Mayor before election
Michael A. Bilandic (appointed)
Democratic
Elected Mayor
Michael A. Bilandic
Democratic

The Chicago mayoral election of 1977 was a special election held on June 7, 1977, to complete the remainder of the unexpired mayoral term of Richard J. Daley who died of a heart attack in December 1976. The election saw Interim Mayor Michael A. Bilandic win the election. Bliandic defeated Republican city council member Dennis H. Block by a landslide 56% margin.

The election was preceded by February primary elections to determine the Democratic Party and Republican Party nominations. Bilandic won a strong victory over several opponents in the Democratic primary, including Congressman Roman Pucinski, State Senator Harold Washington, and former Cook County state's attorney Edward Hanrahan. Block easily defeated three opponents in the Republican primary.

== Background ==
After the death in office of Richard J. Daley on December 20, 1976, Bilandic had been selected by the Chicago City Council to serve as acting mayor for six months until an election would be held. On December 24, Bilandic told alderman and other city hall leaders that he would not be competing in the upcoming special election for the remainder of Daley's term. However, the following week, Bilandic reneged on this pledge, and announced that he would be open to a draft. By 1977, Chicago had not elected a Republican mayor, and had only elected Democratic mayors, for a half-century, with the last Republican elected having been William Hale Thompson in 1927. Dating back to Edward J. Kelly, who took office in 1933, all Chicago mayors up to this point (Kelly, Martin H. Kennelly, Richard J. Daley, and now Bilandic) had hailed in some sense from Bilandic's 11th Ward.

== Primaries and nominations ==
47.07% of registered voters participated in the primary elections.

== Democratic primary ==
=== Candidates ===
Ran

- Michael A. Bilandic, incumbent acting mayor
- Edward Hanrahan, former Cook County state's attorney (1968–72)
- Anthony Robert Martin-Trigona, attorney
- Roman Pucinski, alderman from the 41st ward since 1973 and former U.S. congressman (1959–1973)
- Ellis Reid, attorney
- Harold Washington, state senator

Declined to run

The following individual was speculated to run, but did not:

- William Singer, former alderman (1969–1975); candidate for the Democratic mayoral nomination in 1975

=== Campaign ===
On December 28, 1976 (the same day that Bilandic was appointed acting mayor), alderman Pucinski became the first candidate to formally declare themselves a candidate for the special election. Two weeks later, Bilandic announced that he would be open to running in the election if drafted to do so. This was despite having promised during negotiations that secured his appointment as acting mayor that he would not run in the special election.

Bilandic won the Democratic Party's primary. Bilandic had a well-staged "draft" effort. He won the Cook County Democratic Party central committee's endorsement. Pucinski had entered the race at the point when Bilandic had yet to reverse course on his pledge to not seek election. The party organization had pressured him to drop out of the race for Bilandic's benefit, which he refused to do. Pucinski sought to receive strong support from the city's sizable Polish-American electorage. He also sought to challenge Bilandic to a series of debates, which Bilandic declined. Pucinski was considered Bilandic's foremost opponent in the primary.

Puncinski argued that a Bilandic administration would present more, "politics-as-usual". Pucinski focused much of his campaign on addressing the issue of unemployment. He alleged that Bilandic had been using unfair campaign tactics, alleging that Puncinski campaign workers and supporters had received threats from landlords and city inspectors. State Senator Harold Washington's campaign was underfunded and lacked strong organization. He also suffered due to the impact of personal legal issues. He focused his campaign on the black wards of the city's South Side. Washington was an African American, and was counting on receiving strong African American support. Also running was disgraced former Cook County State's Attorney Edward Hanrahan. Minor candidates in the primary were lawyers Anthony R. Martin-Trigona and Ellis E. Reid, the latter of whom was African American.

Wanting to be seen by voters as a competent administrator and chief executive, Bilandic refused to be drawn into controversy and largely ignored his opponents. He sought to also present himself as a friend to business and a successful labor mediator. During the campaign, he made appearances at ribbon-cutting ceremonies, charity dinners, and other events. The Washington Post noted that, largely absent from the discourse of the primary, had been the issues of industries leaving the city, public transport, the quality of schools, and racial integration.

=== Results ===
Bilandic won a plurality of the vote in 38 of the city's 50 wards. Pucinski won a plurality of the vote in 7 wards (all on the North and Northwest Sides). Washington won a plurality of the vote in 5 wards. Bilandic had won Southwest Side Polish wards that Pucinski had been counting on winning. After the election results came in, Washington alleged that there had been, "massive vote fraud".

Chicago Democratic Party Mayoral Primary, 1977
Candidate	Votes	%
Michael A. Bilandic (incumbent)	368,400	51.1%
Roman Pucinski	235,790	32.7%
Harold Washington	77,322	10.7%
Edward Hanrahan	28,643	4.0%
Anthony Robert Martin-Trigona	6,674	0.9%
Ellis Reid	4,022	0.6%
Total	720,851	100%

Results by ward
Ward	Michael Bilandic		Roman Pucinski		Harold Washington		Edward Hanrahan		Anthony Robert Martin-trigona		Ellis Reid		Total
Ward	Votes	%	Votes	%	Votes	%	Votes	%	Votes	%	Votes	%	Votes
1	7,899	70.1%	1,833	16.3%	1,043	9.3%	374	3.3%	72	0.6%	44	0.4%	11,265
2	5,246	51.3%	1,612	15.8%	2,931	28.6%	173	1.7%	109	1.1%	160	1.6%	10,231
3	4,578	56.8%	1,088	13.5%	2,121	26.3%	116	1.4%	72	0.9%	85	1.1%	8,060
4	4,973	48.2%	1,845	17.9%	3,101	30.1%	186	1.8%	86	0.8%	123	1.2%	10,314
5	3,118	29.6%	2,799	26.6%	3,995	38.0%	250	2.4%	156	1.5%	204	1.9%	10,522
6	4,446	41.4%	1,244	11.6%	4,557	42.4%	135	1.3%	85	0.8%	280	2.6%	10,747
7	3,565	36.1%	2,973	30.1%	2,854	28.9%	257	2.6%	108	1.1%	112	1.1%	9,869
8	5,436	38.4%	1,622	11.5%	6,514	46.1%	161	1.1%	141	1.0%	268	1.9%	14,142
9	3,419	40.3%	1,241	14.6%	3,462	40.8%	157	1.9%	90	1.1%	108	1.3%	8,477
10	11,452	61.4%	4,332	23.2%	1,938	10.4%	690	3.7%	163	0.9%	85	0.5%	18,660
11	22,644	86.8%	2,532	9.7%	369	1.4%	435	1.7%	67	0.3%	45	0.2%	26,092
12	10,480	53.0%	7,884	39.9%	328	1.7%	915	4.6%	144	0.7%	22	0.1%	19,773
13	16,552	62.7%	8,029	30.4%	99	0.4%	1,484	5.6%	209	0.8%	20	0.1%	26,393
14	10,103	60.3%	5,053	30.1%	809	4.8%	649	3.9%	119	0.7%	31	0.2%	16,764
15	7,899	57.6%	2,785	20.3%	2,265	16.5%	587	4.3%	114	0.8%	70	0.5%	13,720
16	5,335	56.4%	1,074	11.3%	2,770	29.3%	125	1.3%	62	0.7%	100	1.1%	9,466
17	3,517	43.1%	1,015	12.4%	3,395	41.6%	93	1.1%	64	0.8%	76	0.9%	8,160
18	11,242	54.9%	4,832	23.6%	2,852	13.9%	1,264	6.2%	178	0.9%	93	0.5%	20,461
19	12,891	63.6%	4,860	24.0%	682	3.4%	1,625	8.0%	173	0.9%	41	0.2%	20,272
20	4,622	50.9%	1,219	13.4%	2,909	32.1%	147	1.6%	79	0.9%	100	1.1%	9,076
21	5,157	39.3%	1,400	10.7%	5,960	45.4%	163	1.2%	143	1.1%	293	2.2%	13,116
22	6,278	55.5%	3,556	31.4%	884	7.8%	470	4.2%	91	0.8%	39	0.3%	11,318
23	12,466	54.9%	8,722	38.4%	82	0.4%	1,194	5.3%	189	0.8%	44	0.2%	22,697
24	4,651	55.0%	1,166	13.8%	2,414	28.5%	107	1.3%	61	0.7%	63	0.7%	8,462
25	7,954	70.6%	2,448	21.7%	513	4.6%	260	2.3%	60	0.5%	28	0.2%	11,263
26	8,149	58.3%	5,013	35.9%	310	2.2%	401	2.9%	65	0.5%	30	0.2%	13,968
27	7,122	70.0%	1,224	12.0%	1,538	15.1%	163	1.6%	70	0.7%	51	0.5%	10,168
28	3,990	54.3%	1,094	14.9%	2,001	27.2%	125	1.7%	67	0.9%	71	1.0%	7,348
29	3,505	49.5%	1,096	15.5%	2,200	31.1%	129	1.8%	91	1.3%	57	0.8%	7,078
30	6,622	44.8%	7,042	47.7%	164	1.1%	781	5.3%	134	0.9%	32	0.2%	14,775
31	10,886	70.7%	3,611	23.5%	391	2.5%	381	2.5%	90	0.6%	30	0.2%	15,389
32	6,518	50.7%	5,592	43.5%	201	1.6%	416	3.2%	96	0.7%	32	0.2%	12,855
33	6,171	50.4%	5,186	42.4%	156	1.3%	576	4.7%	120	1.0%	32	0.3%	12,241
34	5,430	47.9%	1,183	10.4%	4,342	38.3%	134	1.2%	122	1.1%	128	1.1%	11,339
35	4,886	29.6%	10,558	63.9%	81	0.5%	808	4.9%	152	0.9%	44	0.3%	16,529
36	11,011	46.0%	10,993	46.0%	126	0.5%	1,501	6.3%	234	1.0%	54	0.2%	23,919
37	5,700	50.6%	2,961	26.3%	1,769	15.7%	636	5.6%	147	1.3%	62	0.5%	11,275
38	7,393	34.5%	12,506	58.4%	87	0.4%	1,140	5.3%	239	1.1%	54	0.3%	21,419
39	8,000	46.9%	7,824	45.8%	189	1.1%	824	4.8%	193	1.1%	44	0.3%	17,074
40	6,247	44.2%	6,667	47.1%	148	1.0%	784	5.5%	234	1.7%	64	0.5%	14,144
41	6,343	23.1%	19,724	71.8%	97	0.4%	1,114	4.1%	161	0.6%	39	0.1%	27,478
42	7,861	57.3%	4,021	29.3%	1,006	7.3%	569	4.1%	141	1.0%	113	0.8%	13,711
43	6,129	44.9%	5,822	42.6%	725	5.3%	677	5.0%	212	1.6%	100	0.7%	13,665
44	6,018	49.7%	4,795	39.6%	475	3.9%	564	4.7%	192	1.6%	67	0.6%	12,111
45	7,922	34.7%	13,562	59.4%	86	0.4%	1,038	4.5%	196	0.9%	29	0.1%	22,833
46	5,317	50.1%	3,931	37.1%	638	6.0%	539	5.1%	122	1.2%	57	0.5%	10,604
47	9,960	61.0%	5,005	30.6%	208	1.3%	931	5.7%	163	1.0%	63	0.4%	16,330
48	5,327	47.7%	4,355	39.0%	627	5.6%	657	5.9%	138	1.2%	61	0.5%	11,165
49	7,007	48.5%	5,658	39.1%	639	4.4%	815	5.6%	226	1.6%	109	0.8%	14,454
50	8,967	45.6%	9,208	46.8%	271	1.4%	923	4.7%	234	1.2%	65	0.3%	19,668
Total	368,404	51.1%	235,795	32.7%	77,322	10.7%	28,643	4.0%	6,674	0.9%	4,022	0.6%	720,860

== Republican primary ==
The Republican nomination was captured by 48th ward alderman Dennis H. Block, who had originally been supportive of Bilandic's interim mayoralty before the incumbent mayor reneged on his pledge not to run for a full term. Block was urged by Governor James R. Thompson to run for mayor so as not to leave the office in the hands of the Democrats.

Block handily won the Republican primary over three other Republican candidates. Block, at the time, was the city's sole Republican alderman (among 50). He had been elected an alderman two years prior. Block was the first mayoral candidate since Martin H. Kennelly to be a resident of Edgewater. Thus, he was the first candidate from Edgewater since 1955 and the first general election nominee since 1951 to hail from Edgewater. He was the fourth overall mayoral candidate from the neighborhood, and would have been the third mayor from the neighborhood if elected.

== Other nominations ==
- Dennis Brasky (Socialist Workers Party)
- Gerald Rose (U.S. Labor Party)

== General election and result ==
The general election generated little interest. At 40%, turnout was considered low. Bilandic won a majority of the vote in each of the city's 50 wards.

Mayor of Chicago 1977 special election (general election)
Party	Candidate	Votes	%
Democratic	Michael A. Bilandic (incumbent)	490,688	77.4
Republican	Dennis H. Block	135,281	21.3
Socialist Workers	Dennis Brasky	5,547	0.9
U.S. Labor	Gerald Rose	2,498	0.4
Turnout		634,014	

Results by ward
Ward	Michael A. Bilandic (Democratic Party)		Dennis H. Block (Republican Party)		Dennis Brasky (Socialist Workers Party)		Gerald Rose (U.S. Labor)		Total
Ward	Votes	%	Votes	%	Votes	%	Votes	%	Votes
1	9,157	87.4%	1,207	11.5%	78	0.7%	36	0.3%	10,478
2	7,022	81.7%	1,375	16.0%	11	1.3%	87	1.0%	8,594
3	6,373	89.3%	634	8.9%	65	0.9%	67	0.9%	7,139
4	6,688	79.6%	1,491	17.7%	135	1.6%	91	1.1%	8,405
5	4,235	58.7%	2,716	37.6%	213	3.0%	56	0.8%	7,22
6	6,397	79.9%	1,432	17.9%	106	1.3%	69	0.9%	8,004
7	5,234	75.4%	1,575	22.7%	79	1.1%	5	0.7%	6,938
8	7,122	79.2%	1,679	18.7%	98	1.1%	9	1.0%	8,989
9	5,085	81.6%	1,055	16.9%	49	0.8%	45	0.7%	6,234
10	13,55	84.2%	2,406	14.9%	97	0.6%	48	0.3%	16,101
11	23,834	94.4%	1,278	5.1%	86	0.3%	42	0.2%	25,24
12	14,794	81.9%	3,15	17.4%	91	0.5%	32	0.2%	18,067
13	20,654	82.6%	4,234	16.9%	101	0.4%	26	0.1%	25,015
14	13,448	86.6%	1,959	12.6%	89	0.6%	37	0.2%	15,533
15	10,067	84.2%	1,765	14.8%	8	0.7%	46	0.4%	11,958
16	6,991	87.6%	844	10.6%	93	1.2%	54	0.7%	7,982
17	5,24	82.9%	932	14.8%	8	1.3%	66	1.0%	6,318
18	13,787	81.2%	3,003	17.7%	129	0.8%	53	0.3%	16,972
19	15,146	78.8%	3,927	20.4%	96	0.5%	43	0.2%	19,212
20	6,343	84.5%	996	13.3%	96	1.3%	7	0.9%	7,505
21	7,855	79.9%	1,763	17.9%	11	1.1%	106	1.1%	9,834
22	8,688	85.3%	1,392	13.7%	64	0.6%	37	0.4%	10,181
23	17,575	79.9%	4,268	19.4%	123	0.6%	32	0.1%	21,998
24	5,645	89.2%	559	8.8%	66	1.0%	55	0.9%	6,325
25	9,841	90.0%	1,007	9.2%	59	0.5%	29	0.3%	10,936
26	11,057	86.2%	1,644	12.8%	84	0.7%	42	0.3%	12,827
27	10,14	93.3%	614	5.7%	67	0.6%	44	0.4%	10,865
28	5,197	88.7%	541	9.2%	55	0.9%	63	1.1%	5,856
29	4,395	86.7%	592	11.7%	57	1.1%	26	0.5%	5,07
30	9,07	71.1%	3,518	27.6%	141	1.1%	36	0.3%	12,765
31	13,086	89.4%	1,442	9.8%	8	0.5%	33	0.2%	14,641
32	9,754	81.7%	2,042	17.1%	108	0.9%	39	0.3%	11,943
33	9,45	76.5%	2,722	22.0%	132	1.1%	46	0.4%	12,35
34	6,64	83.0%	1,198	15.0%	92	1.1%	74	0.9%	8,004
35	8,754	64.9%	4,563	33.8%	138	1.0%	39	0.3%	13,494
36	16,806	75.9%	5,132	23.2%	147	0.7%	44	0.2%	22,129
37	7,975	82.8%	1,529	15.9%	76	0.8%	5	0.5%	9,63
38	12,505	69.3%	5,353	29.7%	134	0.7%	49	0.3%	18,041
39	11,065	72.1%	4,11	26.8%	137	0.9%	42	0.3%	15,354
40	8,542	64.3%	4,561	34.3%	147	1.1%	37	0.3%	13,287
41	12,696	64.5%	6,783	34.5%	148	0.8%	44	0.2%	19,671
42	9,321	68.9%	4,019	29.7%	13	1.0%	67	0.5%	13,537
43	6,827	56.8%	4,908	40.9%	228	1.9%	47	0.4%	12,01
44	6,94	63.7%	3,762	34.5%	146	1.3%	45	0.4%	10,893
45	12,832	67.9%	5,885	31.2%	136	0.7%	34	0.2%	18,887
46	6,608	66.2%	3,203	32.1%	115	1.2%	58	0.6%	9,984
47	13,002	76.8%	3,80	22.4%	102	0.6%	28	0.2%	16,932
48	6,71	54.1%	5,488	44.2%	162	1.3%	45	0.4%	12,405
49	8,404	64.3%	4,411	33.7%	21	1.6%	48	0.4%	13,073
50	12,141	63.3%	6,814	35.5%	182	0.9%	51	0.3%	19,188
Totals	490,688	77.4%	135,281	21.3%	5,547	0.9%	2,498	0.4%	634,014
