= John Comiskey (politician) =

Irish-American politician (1826–1900)

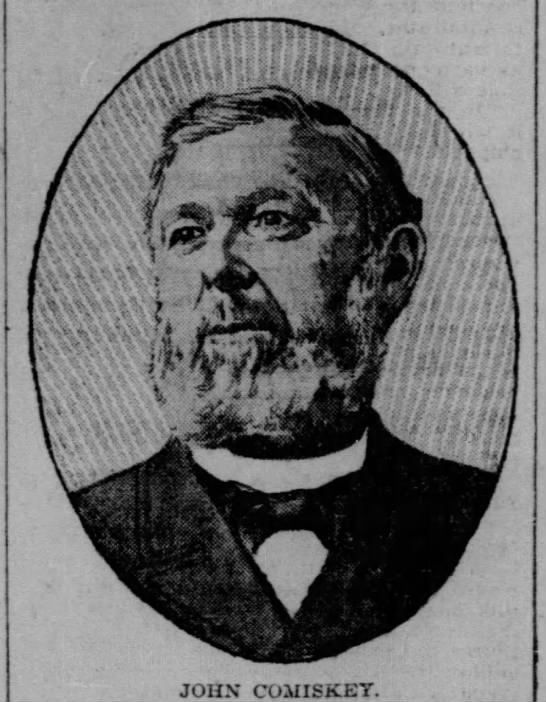

Clerk of the Cook County Board of Commissioners
- In office 1875–1878

Chicago Alderman
- In office 1869–1870
- Constituency: 9th ward
- In office 1867–1869
- Constituency: 8th ward
- In office 1863–1865
- Constituency: 7th ward
- In office 1859–1863
- Constituency: 10th ward

Personal details
- Born: 1826 Crosserlough, Ireland
- Died: January 8, 1900 (aged 73–74) Chicago, Illinois
- Resting place: Calvary Cemetery
- Party: Democratic
- Children: Charles Comiskey
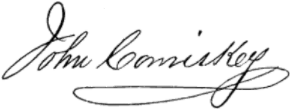
- Signature

John Comiskey (1826 – January 8, 1900) was an Irish-born American Democratic Party politician in Chicago, Illinois. He served on the Chicago City Council for 11 years as Alderman of the 10th (1859–1863), 7th (1863–1865), 8th (1867–1869), and 9th (1869–1870) wards. He was the father of Charles Comiskey.

== Biography ==
John Comiskey was born in Crosserlough, County Cavan, Ireland, in 1826, and in 1848 moved to New Haven, Connecticut in the United States, where he joined the lumber trade. In 1853 he relocated to Chicago, Illinois, where he oversaw the incoming freight on the Chicago, Rock Island and Pacific Railroad. In 1863, he was hired by Shufeldt & Croskey, the prominent distillers. He later worked as superintendent of shipments at a cattle yard in Fort Wayne, Indiana.

Comiskey worked in the Internal Revenue Service during Andrew Johnson's administration but was removed when Ulysses Grant took office, as he was a Democrat. He worked as a bookkeeper by Henry Greenebaum between 1870 and 1875, at which point he was appointed Clerk of the Cook County Board of Commissioners. He returned to bookkeeping, including for the city treasurer's office, when his term ended in 1878.

He died at his home in Chicago on January 8, 1900, and was buried at Calvary Cemetery in Evanston.

=== Political career ===
Comiskey was first elected to the Chicago City Council in the spring of 1859 to represent the 10th ward. Redistricting moved the area into the 7th ward, which he was elected to represent in 1863. In 1867, he was elected to the 8th ward and, when the city was redistricted again, the 9th ward. He served as president of the City Council in his last term. He served a total of 11 years on the council, during which he fought in favor of reform. He supported John F. Finerty's election to the Illinois's 2nd congressional district in 1883.
