= Diversey =

The term Diversey may refer to:

- Diversey (CTA), an 'L' station on the CTA Brown Line.
- Diversey Holdings, manufacturer of cleaning and hygiene products.
- Diversey Parkway (Chicago)

People with the name Diversey:

- Michael Diversey (1810 – 1869), an American beer brewer.
