= Edward Cullerton =

American politician (1841–1920)

- Cullerton, circa 1915

Chicago Alderman
- In office 1901 – February 1, 1920 Serving with Charles J. Byrne (1901–02); Charles J. Moertel (1902–04); Peter K. Hoffman (1904–08); Otto J. Novak (1908–10); Frank P. Danisch (1910–12); Frank W. Bewersdorf (1912–14); Cleophas F. Pettkoske (1914-16); Herman Krumdrick (1916–20)
- Preceded by: Nicholas R. Finn
- Succeeded by: N/A
- Constituency: 11th Ward
- In office 1898–1900 Serving with Rudolph Hurt
- Preceded by: Vaclar Klinka
- Succeeded by: Charles J. Byrne
- Constituency: 9th Ward
- In office 1888–1892 Serving with Henry C. Bartels (1888–89); Joseph E. Bidwill (1889–92)
- Preceded by: Madison R. Harris
- Succeeded by: Frederick Rohde
- Constituency: 9th ward
- In office 1876–1888 Serving with Fred Lodding (1876–79); John J. Altpeter (1879–83); Charles F. L. Doerner (1883–87); Charles A. Monear (1887–88)
- Preceded by: Fred Sommer
- Succeeded by: Edward P. Burke
- Constituency: 6th ward
- In office 1871–1876 Serving with P.J. Hickey (1871–72); Patrick McClory (1872–76)
- Preceded by: William Batterman
- Succeeded by: James H. Hildreth
- Constituency: 7th Ward

Member of the Illinois Senate from the 3rd district
- In office 1873–1874 Serving with Constantine Kahn and Thomas M. Halpin
- Preceded by: George W. Waters
- Succeeded by: William Honan/Conrad L. Neihoff

Member of the Illinois State Board of Equalization from the 2nd district
- In office 1892–1896
- Preceded by: Andrew T. Powers
- Succeeded by: John J. McKenna

Personal details
- Born: 1840 Chicago, Illinois
- Died: February 1, 1920 (aged 79–80) Chicago, Illinois
- Party: Democratic

Edward F. "Foxy Ed" Cullerton (1841–1920) was a politician who was a longtime alderman of the Chicago City Council, and also served as a member of the Illinois Senate.

== Early life and career ==
Cullerton was born in Chicago in 1842. Cullerton's family were some of the original settlers of Chicago.

Cullerton was educated in public schools. He dropped out of elementary school to work as a canalboat driver.

Cullerton was a successful saloon (hotel) keeper.

== Political career ==
Cullerton was a Democrat.

In 1871, Cullerton was elected an alderman of the Chicago Common Council for the 7th ward. He had been elected by a large majority. He continued to serve until 1876. Cullerton also simultaneously served as an Illinois State Senator, having been elected to its 3rd district in 1872, holding the seat from 1873–1874. In the Illinois Senate he distinguished himself by standing as an opponent to the West Side Park Commissioners' taxation scheme, and also became well-versed in parliamentary procedure. From 1892–96, Cullerton served as the 2nd district member on the Illinois State Board of Equalization.

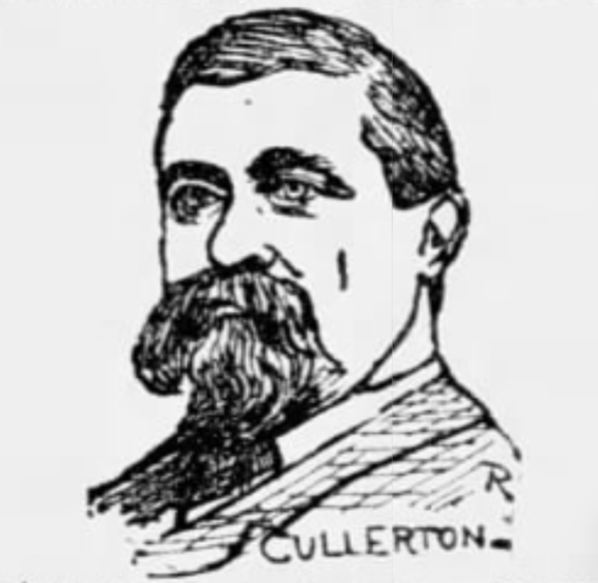
Sketch of Cullerton, circa 1886

In 1876, Cullerton was elected an alderman of what, that year, was re-titled the Chicago City Council for the 6th ward. In 1888, he was redistricted to the 9th ward, where he served until 1892. During part of this tenure, he was Chairman of the Finance Committee.

1915 campaign poster

In 1898, Cullerton was again elected alderman for the 9th ward. He served until 1900.

In 1901, Cullerton was elected alderman for the 11th ward. He served until his death in 1920. At the time of his death, having served as an alderman for a cumulative 48 years, he was the longest-serving alderman in the history of the Chicago City Council, a record he would continue to hold for many years. Cullerton died in his home on February 1, 1920, at the age of 78.

In 1897, Cullerton unsuccessfully ran to rejoin the state assembly, seeking election to its 5th district seat.

Cullerton had a reputation for being shrewd and for being quiet, giving root to his nickname "Foxy Ed". He was despised by proponents of clean government, but well-liked by voters in his own ward.

== Legacy ==
Cullerton Street in Chicago, previously known as 20th Street, was named for him shortly after his death. His residence, at the time of his death, had been on this street.

=== Family political dynasty ===
Cullerton began what has become a Cullerton family political dynasty.

For a cumulative period of 112 years, at least one member of the Cullerton family sat on the Chicago City Council. A series of Cullerton's descendants would hold the aldermanship of the 38th ward, including P. J. Cullerton, William J. Cullerton, Thomas W. Cullerton, and Timothy Cullerton. Also, family in-law Thomas R. Allen held this seat.

P. J. Cullerton was an ally of Richard J. Daley, and served as Cook County assessor, and 38th ward alderman, and 38th ward Democratic committeeman.

Patti Jo "P.J." Cullerton, served as the 38th ward Democratic committeewoman for over 20 years.

John Cullerton (his great-grandnephew) served as president of the Illinois Senate, and Tom Cullerton served as an Illinois state senator as well.
