= Senator Cullerton =

Senator Cullerton may refer to:

- Edward Cullerton (1841–1920), Illinois State Senate
- John Cullerton (born 1948), Illinois State Senate
- Tom Cullerton (born 1969), Illinois State Senate
