= Barnet Hodes =

Barnet Hodes (1900 – 1980) was an American attorney, Democratic politician, civic leader, and art collector in Chicago, Illinois. He served as a Chicago Alderman from 1931 until 1933 and as Corporation Counsel for the City of Chicago under Mayor Edward Joseph Kelly. As head of the Patriotic Foundation of Chicago, Hodes spearheaded efforts to commission sculptors Lorado Taft and Leonard Crunelle to create the patriotic monument that depicts George Washington, Robert Morris and Haym Salomon that stands on Wacker Drive's Heald Square. Hodes is known for his significant mid‑twentieth‑century collection of Surrealist art, especially works by René Magritte. Hodes Park in Chicago was named for Barnet Hodes.

== Political and legal career ==
Hodes was elected 7th Ward alderman in 1931 and later served as 5th Ward Democratic committeeman beginning in 1942. He served as Assistant Corporation Counsel and Corporation Counsel for the City of Chicago. Archival materials document his role in Adlai Stevenson II's presidential campaigns in 1952 and 1956. He later practiced law with Arvey, Hodes, Costello & Burman.

== Art collection and relationship with René Magritte and William Copley ==
Hodes was an important American collector of Surrealist art and one of René Magritte's earliest patrons in the United States. Between 1956 and 1964, Magritte produced approximately sixty gouaches for Hodes. Christie's provenance records confirm that Hodes acquired works directly from Magritte and corresponded with the artist. His collecting activities were connected to William N. Copley and the Surrealist network.

== Personal life and family ==
Barnet Hodes was born in 1900 and lived in Chicago, Illinois. He was married to Eleanor Cramer Hodes. Their daughter, Kay Hodes Kamin, married Malcolm S. Kamin, a delegate to the Sixth Illinois Constitutional Convention (1969–1970). He is the grandfather of Kim Kamin, an attorney and adjunct professor at Northwestern University Pritzker School of Law. Hodes died in 1980.

== Works ==
- It's Your Money 1935
- Law and the Modern City 1937
- The Law of Mobile Homes 1957 (with G. Gale Robertson)
- Commerce Clearinghouse Inc. 1957 (Chicago)
