= William Hall (Illinois politician) =

American politician (born 1984/85)

Member of the Chicago City Council from the 6th ward
- Incumbent
- Assumed office May 15, 2023
- Preceded by: Roderick Sawyer

Personal details
- Born: 1984 or 1985 (age 41–42)
- Party: Democratic
- Education: DePaul University (BS); McCormick Theological Seminary (MDiv)

William E. Hall (born 1984/1985) is an American politician and pastor from Chicago. He is the alderperson for Chicago City Council's 6th ward, having won the 2023 election for the office. The 6th ward is on Chicago's South Side, and includes portions of the Greater Grand Crossing and Chatham neighborhoods.

== Chicago City Council ==
Since his election in 2023, Hall has been a close ally of Mayor Brandon Johnson.

In 2024, Hall proposed new regulations to license and tax hemp stores in Chicago amidst a growing push by state lawmakers to ban the sale of synthetic cannabinoid products. Hall argued that his proposed reforms were an important first step in ensuring safety around the largely unregulated industry.

== Electoral history ==
2023 Chicago aldermanic election, 6th ward, runoff election
Party	Candidate	Votes	%
Nonpartisan	William E. Hall	6,332	58.23%
Nonpartisan	Richard A. Wooten	4,543	41.77%
Total votes		10,875	100%

2023 Chicago aldermanic election, 6th ward, general election
Party	Candidate	Votes	%
Nonpartisan	William Hall	2,483	23.8
Nonpartisan	Richard Wooten	2,412	23.1
Nonpartisan	Kim Egonmwan	878	8.4
Nonpartisan	Barbara Ann Bunville	852	8.2
Nonpartisan	Sharon Pincham	841	8.1
Nonpartisan	Sylvester Baker Jr.	714	6.9
Nonpartisan	Paul Bryson Sr.	591	5.7
Nonpartisan	Aja Kearney	470	4.5
Nonpartisan	Patrick Brutus	448	4.3
Nonpartisan	Tavares Briggs	393	3.8
Nonpartisan	Kirby Birgans	342	3.3
Total votes		10,424	100.0

== See also ==
- List of Chicago alderpersons since 1923
