= Michael Diversey =

American beer brewer

Chicago Alderman
- In office 1856–1858 Serving with Samuel McKay (1856–1857); Philip Conley (1857–1857)
- Preceded by: Morgan L. Keith
- Succeeded by: Benjamin Carpenter
- Constituency: 9th ward
- In office 1844–1845 Serving with Buckner Stith Morris (1844); James H. Rees (1844–1845)
- Preceded by: George W. Dole/ J. Marback
- Succeeded by: Mahlon D. Ogden/ Richard C. Ross
- Constituency: 6th ward

Personal details
- Born: December 10, 1810 Germany
- Died: December 12, 1869 (aged 59)
- Spouse: Angela
- Occupation: Beer brewery owner

Michael Diversey (born Diversy as shown on his grave in St. Boniface Catholic Cemetery in Chicago; December 10, 1810 – December 12, 1869) was an American beer brewer, owner of the Diversey Beer Brewery. Diversey was an immigrant from Illingen, Kingdom of Prussia. He landed in the US in 1830, and went into partnership with English immigrant William Lill around 1841. The company changed its name and became the Lill & Diversey Brewery, also known simply as The Chicago Brewery. It was destroyed in the 1871 Great Chicago Fire

Michael Diversey was a philanthropist. He was also a Chicago alderman (1844–45; 1856–1868). During the 1850s, Diversey was active in the antiprohibitionist crusade that sought to repel the influence of temperance reformers who attempted to ban the sale and manufacture of alcohol.

The Diversey Parkway in Chicago is named after him. St. Michael’s Catholic Church in Chicago was built on land donated to the parish by Michael Diversey, and the choice of 'Michael' in the name was in honor of him too. Until 1885, St. Michael’s was the tallest building in Chicago.

Michael Diversey was married to Angela Diversy (June 10, 1810 – November 9, 1883). Oil portraits of Michael and Angela Diversy are in the collection of the Chicago History Museum.
