= Jessie Fuentes =

American politician

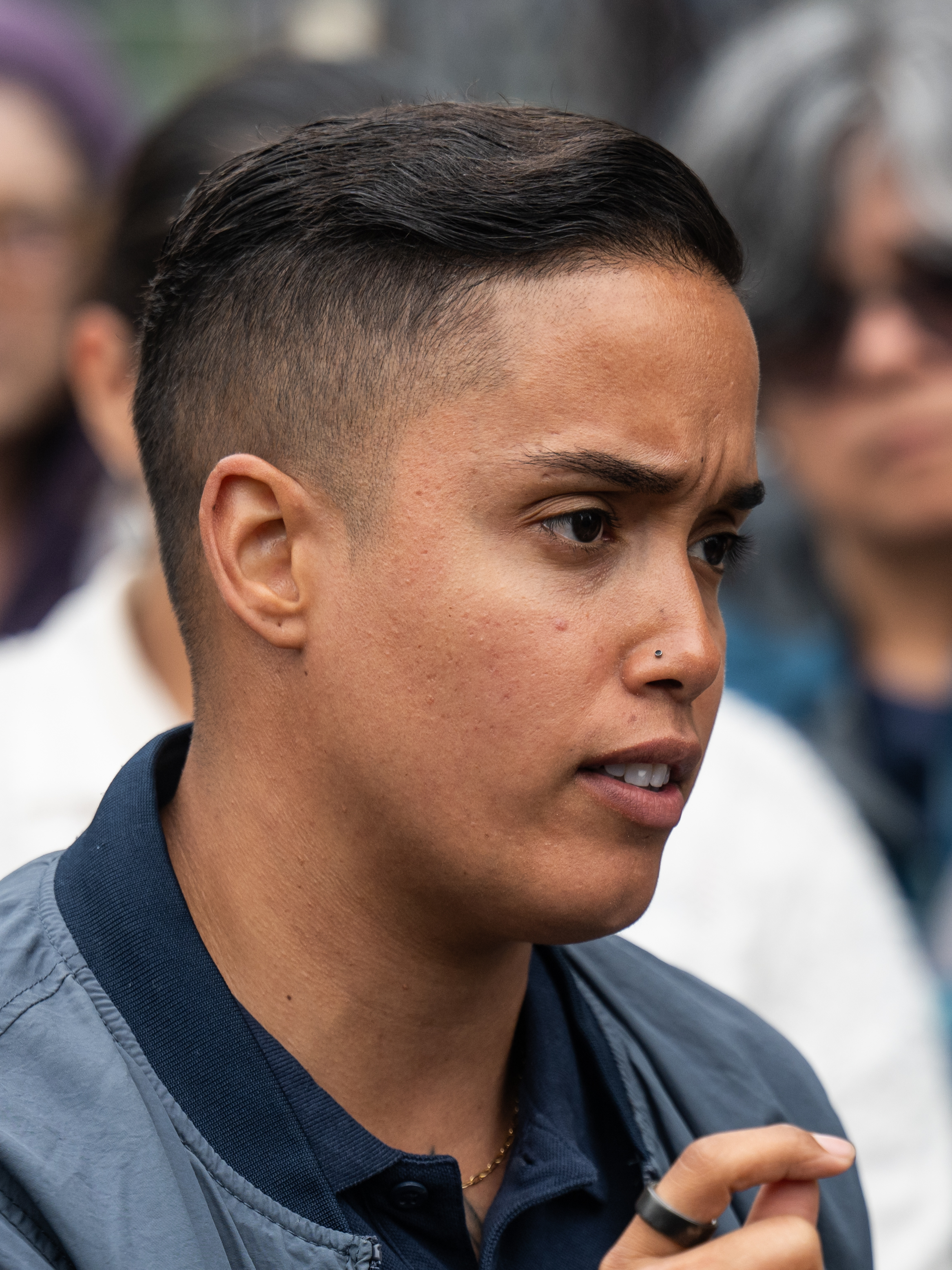
- Fuentes in 2025

Member of the Chicago City Council from the 26th ward
- Incumbent
- Assumed office May 15, 2023
- Preceded by: Roberto Maldonado

Personal details
- Born: 1990 or 1991 (age 35–36)
- Party: Democratic
- Education: Northeastern Illinois University (BA, MEd)

Jessica "Jessie" Fuentes (born 1990/1991) is an American politician from Chicago. She is the alderperson for Chicago City Council's 26th ward, having won the 2023 election to the office. The 26th ward includes parts of the Humboldt Park, Logan Square, Hermosa, West Town, and Belmont Cragin neighborhoods.

== Early life and career ==
Fuentes grew up in the Humboldt Park neighborhood of Chicago. She attended Carl Schurz High School and later transferred to Dr. Pedro Albizu Campos High School. She earned a bachelor's degree in justice studies and Latino and Latin American studies and a Master of Education degree in community and teachers leadership from Northeastern Illinois University.

She worked as a program director at the youth center Café Teatro Batey Urbano and later as dean of students at her alma mater Dr. Pedro Albizu Campos High School and at Roberto Clemente Community Academy. Prior to her election, Fuentes was the director of policy and youth advocacy for the Puerto Rican Cultural Center.

== City Council campaign ==
Fuentes ran to represent the 26th ward in the 2023 election, initially against incumbent Roberto Maldonado. After collecting signatures to appear on the ballot, Maldonado decided against running, making the election an open race. Maldonado later endorsed Fuentes. Fuentes won a three-way race in the February 2023 election with over 50% of the vote, negating the need for a runoff election. In the 2023 Chicago mayoral election runoff, Fuentes endorsed eventual winner Brandon Johnson.

== Electoral history ==
Chicago 26th ward aldermanic general election, 2023
Party	Candidate	Votes	%
Nonpartisan	Jessie Fuentes	4,990	55.57
Nonpartisan	Julian Perez	2,863	31.89
Nonpartisan	Angee Gonzalez Rodriguez	1,094	12.18
Nonpartisan	Kirk J. Ortiz (write-in)	32	0.36
Total votes		8,979	100

== See also ==
- List of Chicago alderpersons since 1923
