= Michelle A. Harris =

American politician (born 1961)

Michelle Harris

Member of the Chicago City Council from the 8th ward
- Incumbent
- Assumed office December 13, 2006
- Preceded by: Todd Stroger

Personal details
- Born: December 13, 1961 (age 64) Chicago, Illinois, U.S.
- Party: Democratic
- Education: Chicago State University (BA)

Michelle A. Harris (born December 13, 1961) is an American politician who is the alderperson of Chicago's 8th ward and the chair of the Chicago City Council's rules committee.

== Early life and education ==
Harris was raised on the south side of Chicago where she attended Chicago Vocational High School and Chicago State University.

== Aldermanic career ==
Harris began her aldermanic career in 2006. She was appointed by mayor Richard M. Daley to fill the vacancy left after Todd Stroger retired to become President of the Cook County Board of Commissioners. On December 13, 2006, Michelle Harris was confirmed as Alderwoman by the Chicago City Council and sworn in. Harris has subsequently been reelected in 2007, 2011, 2015, and 2019.

In 2014, she had expressed support for a proposed marijuana dispensary on 87th street and by 2015 had changed her opinion on the issue. Also in 2014, she was investigated by the Illinois Attorney General for violating Illinois' Open Meetings Act for failure to give adequate notice that two referendums were to be on a public meetings agenda. In 2015 she "demanded" along with 14 other African-American aldermen, that Mayor Rahm Emanuel fire Police Superintendent Garry McCarthy due to inefficacy in combating murders in her ward.

In an article titled "The Big Spenders—and What They Charged", Chicago magazine lists out the most egregious examples of luxurious spending of campaign contributions by Illinois politicians. Harris, for example, is cited for used her campaign account in the amount of $3,849 for airfare to Turkey in 2012.

In the runoff of the 2019 Chicago mayoral election, Harris endorsed Toni Preckwinkle against her opponent Lori Lightfoot. However, Harris has since served as Mayor Lightfoot's floor leader during her mayoralty, being a City Council ally of Lightfoot.

== 2016 clerk of the Circuit Court of Cook County campaign ==
In 2016, Harris challenged incumbent Dorothy A. Brown in the Democratic primary for Clerk of the Circuit Court of Cook County. Harris lost the primary, receiving 307,392 votes (30.53%) to Brown's 477,503 (47.43%), with the remaining 221,921 votes (22.04%) going to Jacob Meister.

== Electoral history ==
2007 Chicago 8th Ward aldermanic election
Party	Candidate	Votes	%
Nonpartisan	Michelle A. Harris (incumbent)	8,446	60.58
Nonpartisan	Joseph McAfee	1,260	9.04
Nonpartisan	Faheem Shabazz	1,182	8.48
Nonpartisan	Cliff Underwood	1,055	7.57
Nonpartisan	Derrick T. Prince	768	5.51
Nonpartisan	Van B. Newell Jr.	553	3.97
Nonpartisan	Dennis Allen	346	2.48
Nonpartisan	Sharon Ann Adams	333	2.39
Total votes		13,943	100

2011 Chicago 8th Ward aldermanic election
Party	Candidate	Votes	%
Nonpartisan	Michelle A. Harris (incumbent)	10,395	68.38
Nonpartisan	Faheem Shabazz	2,215	14.57
Nonpartisan	James L. Daniels	1,879	12.36
Nonpartisan	Bertha F. Starks	713	4.69
Total votes		15,202	100

2015 Chicago 8th Ward aldermanic election
Party	Candidate	Votes	%
Nonpartisan	Michelle A. Harris (incumbent)	9,167	68.53
Nonpartisan	Faheem Shabazz	2,113	15.80
Nonpartisan	Tara F. Baldridge	2,096	15.67
Total votes		13,376	100

2016 Clerk of the Circuit Court of Cook County Democratic primary
Party	Candidate	Votes	%
Democratic	Dorothy A. Brown (incumbent)	477,503	47.43
Democratic	Michelle A. Harris	307,392	30.53
Democratic	Jacob Meister	221,921	22.04
Total votes		1,006,816	100

2019 Chicago 8th Ward aldermanic election
Party	Candidate	Votes	%
Nonpartisan	Michelle A. Harris (incumbent)	8,723	64.35
Nonpartisan	Linda Hudson	2,356	17.38
Nonpartisan	Faheem Shabazz	1,385	10.22
Nonpartisan	Jewel Easterling-Smith	1,091	8.05
Total votes		13,555	100

== See also ==
- List of Chicago alderpersons since 1923
