= 9th ward, Chicago =

Ward in Chicago

9th Ward - Chicago
- Ward
- Ward 9
- Current Chicago ward map, with 9th ward highlighted in red
- Country: United States
- State: Illinois
- County: Cook
- City: Chicago
- Established: 1847
- Communities: list

Government
  - Type: Ward
  - Body: Chicago City Council
  - Alderperson: Anthony Beale (Democratic Party)

The 9th Ward is one of the 50 aldermanic wards with representation in the City Council of Chicago, Illinois.

== History ==
The ward was created on February 16, 1847, when the number of wards in the city increased from six to nine.

=== Before 1923 ===
Before 1923, wards were represented by two aldermen.

Aldermen					# Council	Aldermen				
Alderman	Term in office	Party	Notes	Cite	# Council	Alderman	Term in office	Party	Notes	Cite
Michael McDonald	1847–1849				11th	William B. Ogden	1847–1848	Democratic	Previously served in 6th ward	
Michael McDonald	1847–1849				12th	Samuel McKay	1848–1850			
F.C. Hageman	1849–1852				13th	Samuel McKay	1848–1850			
F.C. Hageman	1849–1852				14th	R. J. Hamilton	1849-1851	Democratic		
F.C. Hageman	1849–1852				15th	Walter L. Newberry	1851-1853			
John H. Kinzie	1852–1854		Previously served in the 6th ward		16th	Walter L. Newberry	1851-1853			
John H. Kinzie	1852–1854		Previously served in the 6th ward		17th	Henry A. Mitchell	1853–1855			
Morgan L. Keith	1854–1856				18th	Henry A. Mitchell	1853–1855			
Morgan L. Keith	1854–1856				19th	Samuel McKay	1855–1857			
Michael Diversey	1856–1858		Previously served in 6th ward		20th	Samuel McKay	1855–1857			
Michael Diversey	1856–1858		Previously served in 6th ward		21st	Philip Conley	1857–1859			
Benjamin Carpenter	1858–1860				22nd	Philip Conley	1857–1859			
Benjamin Carpenter	1858–1860				23rd	J.A. Huck	1859–1861			
Gurden Perkins	1860–1862				24th	J.A. Huck	1859–1861			
Gurden Perkins	1860–1862				25th	Robert Law	1861-1863			
William T. Shufeldt	1862–1863		Redistricted to 16th ward in 1864		26th	Robert Law	1861-1863			
Francis C. Brown	1863–1864		Redistricted from 6th ward		27th	Mancel Talcott	1863–1867		Redistricted from 6th ward	
Willard Woodard	1864–1869	Republican	Redistricted to 12th ward in 1869		28th	Mancel Talcott	1863–1867		Redistricted from 6th ward	
Willard Woodard	1864–1869	Republican	Redistricted to 12th ward in 1869		29th	Mancel Talcott	1863–1867		Redistricted from 6th ward	
Willard Woodard	1864–1869	Republican	Redistricted to 12th ward in 1869		30th	Mancel Talcott	1863–1867		Redistricted from 6th ward	
Willard Woodard	1864–1869	Republican	Redistricted to 12th ward in 1869		31st	John H. Carpenter	1867–1869			
Willard Woodard	1864–1869	Republican	Redistricted to 12th ward in 1869		32nd	John H. Carpenter	1867–1869			
Willard Woodard	1864–1869	Republican	Redistricted to 12th ward in 1869		33rd	John H. Carpenter	1867–1869			
John Comiskey	1869–1870	Democratic	Redistricted from 8th ward		34th	George Powell	1869–1873			
William B. Bateham	1870–1872				35th	George Powell	1869–1873			
William B. Bateham	1870–1872				36th	George Powell	1869–1873			
James O'Brien	1872–1875		Later elected alderman again in 1876 in 8th ward		37th	George Powell	1869–1873			
James O'Brien	1872–1875		Later elected alderman again in 1876 in 8th ward		38th	Thomas H. Bailey	1873–1875			
James O'Brien	1872–1875		Later elected alderman again in 1876 in 8th ward		39th	Thomas H. Bailey	1873–1875			
Jacob Beidler	1876–1879				40th	John M. Van Osdel	1876–1878	Republican		
Jacob Beidler	1876–1879				41st	John M. Van Osdel	1876–1878	Republican		
Jacob Beidler	1876–1879				42nd	John M. Smyth	1878–1882	Republican		
James Peevey	1879–1883	Democratic			43rd	John M. Smyth	1878–1882	Republican		
James Peevey	1879–1883	Democratic			44th	John M. Smyth	1878–1882	Republican		
James Peevey	1879–1883	Democratic			45th	John M. Smyth	1878–1882	Republican		
James Peevey	1879–1883	Democratic			46th	Michael Gaynor	1882–1884	Democratic		
John Foley	1883–1884	Democratic			47th	Michael Gaynor	1882–1884	Democratic		
William F. Mahoney	1884–1887	Democratic	Later elected alderman again in 1890 in 18th ward		46th	John Gaynor	1884–1886			
William F. Mahoney	1884–1887	Democratic	Later elected alderman again in 1890 in 18th ward		49th	John Gaynor	1884–1886			
William F. Mahoney	1884–1887	Democratic	Later elected alderman again in 1890 in 18th ward		50th	John R. Wheeler	1886–1888	Republican		
Madison R. Harris	1887–1888		Redistricted to 18th ward in 1888		51st	John R. Wheeler	1886–1888	Republican		
Edward Cullerton	1888–1892	Democratic	Redistricted from 6th ward		52nd	Henry C. Bartels	1888–1889			
Edward Cullerton	1888–1892	Democratic	Redistricted from 6th ward		53rd	Joseph E. Bidwill	1889–1897			
Edward Cullerton	1888–1892	Democratic	Redistricted from 6th ward		54th	Joseph E. Bidwill	1889–1897			
Edward Cullerton	1888–1892	Democratic	Redistricted from 6th ward		55th	Joseph E. Bidwill	1889–1897			
Frederick Rohde	1892–1896	Democratic			56th	Joseph E. Bidwill	1889–1897			
Frederick Rohde	1892–1896	Democratic			57th	Joseph E. Bidwill	1889–1897			
Frederick Rohde	1892–1896	Democratic			58th	Joseph E. Bidwill	1889–1897			
Frederick Rohde	1892–1896	Democratic			59th	Joseph E. Bidwill	1889–1897			
Vaclar Klinka	1896–1898				60th	Joseph E. Bidwill	1889–1897			
Vaclar Klinka	1896–1898				61st	Rudolph Hurt	1897–1901		Later elected alderman again in 1904 in 10th ward	
Edward Cullerton	1898–1900	Democratic	Later elected alderman again in 1901 in 11th ward		62nd	Rudolph Hurt	1897–1901		Later elected alderman again in 1904 in 10th ward	
Edward Cullerton	1898–1900	Democratic	Later elected alderman again in 1901 in 11th ward		63rd	Rudolph Hurt	1897–1901		Later elected alderman again in 1904 in 10th ward	
Charles J. Byrne	1900–1901		Redistricted to 11th ward in 1901		64th	Rudolph Hurt	1897–1901		Later elected alderman again in 1904 in 10th ward	
Henry L. Fick	1901–1912		Redistricted from 7th ward; later elected alderman again in 1914 in the 20th ward		65th	Nathan T. Brenner	1901–1903		Redistricted from 7th ward	
Henry L. Fick	1901–1912		Redistricted from 7th ward; later elected alderman again in 1914 in the 20th ward		66th	Nathan T. Brenner	1901–1903		Redistricted from 7th ward	
Henry L. Fick	1901–1912		Redistricted from 7th ward; later elected alderman again in 1914 in the 20th ward		67th	Michael J. Preib	1903–1905			
Henry L. Fick	1901–1912		Redistricted from 7th ward; later elected alderman again in 1914 in the 20th ward		68th	Michael J. Preib	1903–1905			
Henry L. Fick	1901–1912		Redistricted from 7th ward; later elected alderman again in 1914 in the 20th ward		69th	Abraham J. Harris	1905–1907			
Henry L. Fick	1901–1912		Redistricted from 7th ward; later elected alderman again in 1914 in the 20th ward		70th	Abraham J. Harris	1905–1907			
Henry L. Fick	1901–1912		Redistricted from 7th ward; later elected alderman again in 1914 in the 20th ward		71st	Dennis J. Egan	1907–1912		Redistricted to 20th ward in 1912	
Henry L. Fick	1901–1912		Redistricted from 7th ward; later elected alderman again in 1914 in the 20th ward		72nd	Dennis J. Egan	1907–1912		Redistricted to 20th ward in 1912	
Henry L. Fick	1901–1912		Redistricted from 7th ward; later elected alderman again in 1914 in the 20th ward		73rd	Dennis J. Egan	1907–1912		Redistricted to 20th ward in 1912	
Henry L. Fick	1901–1912		Redistricted from 7th ward; later elected alderman again in 1914 in the 20th ward		74th	Dennis J. Egan	1907–1912		Redistricted to 20th ward in 1912	
Henry L. Fick	1901–1912		Redistricted from 7th ward; later elected alderman again in 1914 in the 20th ward		75th	Dennis J. Egan	1907–1912		Redistricted to 20th ward in 1912	
Charles E. Reading	1912		Redistricted from 33rd ward		76th	Eugene Block	1912–1917		Redistricted from 33rd ward	
Hiram Vanderbilt	1913–1917	Democratic			77th	Eugene Block	1912–1917		Redistricted from 33rd ward	
Hiram Vanderbilt	1913–1917	Democratic			78th	Eugene Block	1912–1917		Redistricted from 33rd ward	
Hiram Vanderbilt	1913–1917	Democratic			79th	Eugene Block	1912–1917		Redistricted from 33rd ward	
Hiram Vanderbilt	1913–1917	Democratic			80th	Eugene Block	1912–1917		Redistricted from 33rd ward	
—N/a					81st	Charles V. Johnson	1917–1919	Socialist		
Sheldon M. Govier	1918–1933	Democratic	Continued to serve as alderman of this ward after 1923, serving until 1933		82nd	Charles V. Johnson	1917–1919	Socialist		
Sheldon M. Govier	1918–1933	Democratic	Continued to serve as alderman of this ward after 1923, serving until 1933		83rd	Guy Madderom	1919–1923			
Sheldon M. Govier	1918–1933	Democratic	Continued to serve as alderman of this ward after 1923, serving until 1933		84th	Guy Madderom	1919–1923			
Sheldon M. Govier	1918–1933	Democratic	Continued to serve as alderman of this ward after 1923, serving until 1933		85th	Guy Madderom	1919–1923			
Sheldon M. Govier	1918–1933	Democratic	Continued to serve as alderman of this ward after 1923, serving until 1933		86th	Guy Madderom	1919–1923			

=== Since 1923 ===
Since 1923, wards have been represented by a single alderman. Elections have also been nonpartisan, though officeholders often still publicly affiliate with parties.

Alderperson	Term in office	Party	Notes	Cite
Sheldon M. Govier	1923–1933	Democratic		
Arthur G. Lindell	1933-1946	Republican	Resigned	
Reginald DuBois	1946–1959	Republican		
Dominic J. Lupo	1959–1971			
Alexander A. Adduci	1971–1979			
Robert Shaw	1979–1983	Democratic		
Perry H. Hutchinson	1983–1987	Democratic		
Robert Shaw	1987–1998	Democratic	Resigned in order to assume a seat on the Cook County Board of Review	
Melvin Powell Sr.	1999		Appointed by Mayor Richard M. Daley	
Anthony Beale	1999–present	Democratic		
