= 8th ward, Chicago =

Ward in Chicago

8th Ward - Chicago
- Ward
- Ward 8
- Current Chicago ward map, with 8th ward highlighted in red
- Country: United States
- State: Illinois
- County: Cook
- City: Chicago
- Established: 1847
- Communities: list

Government
  - Type: Ward
  - Body: Chicago City Council
  - Alderperson: Michelle A. Harris (Democratic Party)

The 8th Ward is one of the 50 aldermanic wards with representation in the City Council of Chicago, Illinois.

== History ==
The ward was created on February 16, 1847, when the number of wards in the city increased from six to nine.This expansion responded to a rapidly growing population and changing city governance needs. Initially, each ward, including the 8th, elected two aldermen to the city council. This system remained until reforms in 1923, after which wards have been represented by a single alderperson, a practice that continues today.

Over the years, the boundaries of the 8th Ward have changed multiple times due to shifts in population and political redistricting, aiming to maintain equal representation across wards. Historically, early aldermen from this ward included figures like Francis Hoffmann, who later became Lieutenant Governor of Illinois, and John Comiskey, part of a prominent local political family.

In recent decades, notable representatives have included William D. Meyering, William Cousins (a judge and reform advocate), Todd Stroger (who later became president of the Cook County Board of Commissioners), and the current alderperson Michelle A. Harris, who has served since 2006. The ward has consistently reflected key political and demographic trends in Chicago’s South Side..

== Past alders ==
The current alderperson for the 8th ward is Michelle A. Harris, who has represented the ward since 2006.

=== Before 1923 ===
Before 1923, wards were represented by two aldermen.

Aldermen					# Council	Aldermen				
Alderman	Term in office	Party	Notes	Cite	# Council	Alderman	Term in office	Party	Notes	Cite
James Lane	1847–1849				11th	William B. Snowhook	1847–1848			
James Lane	1847–1849				12th	William B. Herrick	1848–1850			
Henry R. Payson	1849–1850				13th	William B. Herrick	1848–1850			
John C. Dodge	1850–1852				14th	George F. Foster	1850–1851		Previously served in 6th ward	
John C. Dodge	1850–1852				15th	Robert Malcolm	1851–1853			
Andrew J. Brown	1852–1854				16th	Robert Malcolm	1851–1853			
Andrew J. Brown	1852–1854				17th	Francis Hoffmann	1853–1854	Democratic		
William H. Stickney	1854–1855				18th	Francis Hoffmann	1853–1854	Democratic		
William H. Stickney	1854–1855				18th	B.W. Thomas	1854–1855			
Samuel Ashton	1855–1856				19th	Stephen D. LaRue	1855–1858			
Conrad L. Niehoff	1856–1857				20th	Stephen D. LaRue	1855–1858			
Christian Wahl	1857–1861				21st	Stephen D. LaRue	1855–1858			
Christian Wahl	1857–1861				22nd	Andrew Wright	1858–1860			
Christian Wahl	1857–1861				23rd	Andrew Wright	1858–1860			
Christian Wahl	1857–1861				24th	Redmond Prindiville	1860–1862			
W.G. White	1861–1862				25th	Redmond Prindiville	1860–1862			
Charles L. Woodman	1862–1863		Redistricted to 16th ward in 1863		26th	Redmond Sheridan	1863		Redistricted from 10th ward	
Charles L. Woodman	1862–1863		Redistricted to 16th ward in 1863		26th	Francis J. Ullbrich	1863–1864		Redistricted from 10th ward	
Richard Clark	1863–1865				27th	Francis J. Ullbrich	1863–1864		Redistricted from 10th ward	
Richard Clark	1863–1865				28th	Patrick Rafferty	1864–1869			
M.L. Frisbee	1865–1867				29th	Patrick Rafferty	1864–1869			
M.L. Frisbee	1865–1867				30th	Patrick Rafferty	1864–1869			
John Comiskey	1867–1869	Democratic	Previously served in 10th and 7th wards; redistricted to 9th ward in 1869		31st	Patrick Rafferty	1864–1869			
John Comiskey	1867–1869	Democratic	Previously served in 10th and 7th wards; redistricted to 9th ward in 1869		32nd	Patrick Rafferty	1864–1869			
John Comiskey	1867–1869	Democratic	Previously served in 10th and 7th wards; redistricted to 9th ward in 1869		33rd	Patrick Rafferty	1864–1869			
James H. Hildreth	1869–1870	Democratic	Redistricted from 7th ward		34th	William S. Powell	1869–1871			
Michael B. Bailey	1870–1874				35th	William S. Powell	1869–1871			
Michael B. Bailey	1870–1874				36th	Jeremiah Clowry	1871–1873			
Michael B. Bailey	1870–1874				37th	Jeremiah Clowry	1871–1873			
Michael B. Bailey	1870–1874				38th	James H. Hildreth	1873–1876	Democratic	Redistricted to 7th ward in 1876	
Patrick C. McDonald	1874–1875				39th	James H. Hildreth	1873–1876	Democratic	Redistricted to 7th ward in 1876	
Frank Lawler	1876–1886	Democratic	Later elected alderman again in 1895 in 19th ward		40th	James O'Brien	1876–1877		Previously served in 9th ward	
Frank Lawler	1876–1886	Democratic	Later elected alderman again in 1895 in 19th ward		41st	Richard M. Oliver	1877–1879			
Frank Lawler	1876–1886	Democratic	Later elected alderman again in 1895 in 19th ward		42nd	Richard M. Oliver	1877–1879			
Frank Lawler	1876–1886	Democratic	Later elected alderman again in 1895 in 19th ward		43rd	Thomas Purcell	1879–1885	Democratic		
Frank Lawler	1876–1886	Democratic	Later elected alderman again in 1895 in 19th ward		44th	Thomas Purcell	1879–1885	Democratic		
Frank Lawler	1876–1886	Democratic	Later elected alderman again in 1895 in 19th ward		45th	Thomas Purcell	1879–1885	Democratic		
Frank Lawler	1876–1886	Democratic	Later elected alderman again in 1895 in 19th ward		46th	Thomas Purcell	1879–1885	Democratic		
Frank Lawler	1876–1886	Democratic	Later elected alderman again in 1895 in 19th ward		47th	Thomas Purcell	1879–1885	Democratic		
Frank Lawler	1876–1886	Democratic	Later elected alderman again in 1895 in 19th ward		48th	Thomas Purcell	1879–1885	Democratic		
Frank Lawler	1876–1886	Democratic	Later elected alderman again in 1895 in 19th ward		49th	Redmond F. Sheridan	1885–1888	Democratic	Redistricted to 19th ward in 1888	
Lawrence A. Yore	1886–1888	Republican			50th	Redmond F. Sheridan	1885–1888	Democratic	Redistricted to 19th ward in 1888	
Lawrence A. Yore	1886–1888	Republican			51st	Redmond F. Sheridan	1885–1888	Democratic	Redistricted to 19th ward in 1888	
Charles A. Monear	1888–1889	Independent Democrat	Redistricted from 6th ward		52nd	Joseph M. Weber	1888–1889		Redistricted from 7th ward	
Frank J. Dvorak	1889–1892				53rd	George F. Bunker	1889–1891			
Frank J. Dvorak	1889–1892				54th	George F. Bunker	1889–1891			
Frank J. Dvorak	1889–1892				55th	Martin Morrison	1891–1895			
William Loeffler	1892–1894	Democratic			58th	Martin Morrison	1891–1895			
William Loeffler	1892–1894	Democratic			57th	Martin Morrison	1891–1895			
Frank Slepicka	1894–1896	Democratic			58th	Martin Morrison	1891–1895			
Frank Slepicka	1894–1896	Democratic			59th	John Bennett	1895–1899			
Frank Meek	1896–1898				60th	John Bennett	1895–1899			
Frank Meek	1896–1898				61st	John Bennett	1895–1899			
Edward J. Novak	1898–1901	Democratic	Redistricted to 10th ward in 1901		62nd	John Bennett	1895–1899			
Edward J. Novak	1898–1901	Democratic	Redistricted to 10th ward in 1901		63rd	Michael S. Garry	1899–1901			
Edward J. Novak	1898–1901	Democratic	Redistricted to 10th ward in 1901		64th	Michael S. Garry	1899–1901			
P. H. Moynihan	1901–1909				65th	John Hugh Jones	1901–1906	Republican	Redistricted from 33rd ward	
P. H. Moynihan	1901–1909				66th	John Hugh Jones	1901–1906	Republican	Redistricted from 33rd ward	
P. H. Moynihan	1901–1909				67rd	John Hugh Jones	1901–1906	Republican	Redistricted from 33rd ward	
P. H. Moynihan	1901–1909				68th	John Hugh Jones	1901–1906	Republican	Redistricted from 33rd ward	
P. H. Moynihan	1901–1909				69th	John Hugh Jones	1901–1906	Republican	Redistricted from 33rd ward	
P. H. Moynihan	1901–1909				70th	John S. Derpa	1906–1908			
P. H. Moynihan	1901–1909				71st	John S. Derpa	1906–1908			
P. H. Moynihan	1901–1909				72nd	John Hugh Jones	1908–1910	Republican		
John R. Emerson	1909–1915	Democratic			73rd	John Hugh Jones	1908–1910	Republican		
John R. Emerson	1909–1915	Democratic			74th	John S. Derpa	1910–1912			
John R. Emerson	1909–1915	Democratic			75th	John S. Derpa	1910–1912			
John R. Emerson	1909–1915	Democratic			76th	Ernest M. Cross	1912–1917		Later elected alderman again in 1923 in 10th ward	
John R. Emerson	1909–1915	Democratic			77th	Ernest M. Cross	1912–1917		Later elected alderman again in 1923 in 10th ward	
John R. Emerson	1909–1915	Democratic			78th	Ernest M. Cross	1912–1917		Later elected alderman again in 1923 in 10th ward	
John E. Tyden	1915–1917	Republican			79th	Ernest M. Cross	1912–1917		Later elected alderman again in 1923 in 10th ward	
John E. Tyden	1915–1917	Republican			80th	Ernest M. Cross	1912–1917		Later elected alderman again in 1923 in 10th ward	
—N/a					81st	Ross A. Woodhull	1917–1923	Democratic		
Martin S. Furman	1918–1923	Democratic			82nd	Ross A. Woodhull	1917–1923	Democratic		
Martin S. Furman	1918–1923	Democratic			83rd	Ross A. Woodhull	1917–1923	Democratic		
Martin S. Furman	1918–1923	Democratic			84th	Ross A. Woodhull	1917–1923	Democratic		
Martin S. Furman	1918–1923	Democratic			85th	Ross A. Woodhull	1917–1923	Democratic		
Martin S. Furman	1918–1923	Democratic			86th	Ross A. Woodhull	1917–1923	Democratic		

=== Since 1923 ===
Since 1923, wards have been represented by a single alderman. Elections have also been nonpartisan, though officeholders often still publicly affiliate with parties.

Alderperson	Term in office	Party	Notes	Cite
William D. Meyering	1923–1930	Democratic		
David L. Sutton		Democratic		
Michael F. Mulcahy				
Roy E. Olin				
Einar Johnson				
James A. Condon				
William Cousins	1967–1976	Democratic		
Marian Humes				
Keith Caldwell				
Lorraine Dixon			Died in office	
Todd Stroger	2001–2006	Democratic	Appointed by Mayor Richard M. Daley. Subsequently won election. Resigned in order to assume office as president of the Cook County Board of Commissioners	
Michelle A. Harris	2006–present	Democratic	Appointed by Mayor Richard M. Daley, subsequently has won election to several terms	
