= 7th ward, Chicago =

Ward in Chicago

7th Ward - Chicago
- Ward
- Ward 7
- Current Chicago ward map, with 7th ward highlighted in red
- Country: United States
- State: Illinois
- County: Cook
- City: Chicago
- Established: 1847
- Communities: list

Government
  - Type: Ward
  - Body: Chicago City Council
  - Alderperson: Gregory Mitchell (Democratic Party)

The 7th Ward is one of the 50 aldermanic wards with representation in the City Council of Chicago, Illinois.

== History ==
The ward was created on February 16, 1847, when the number of wards in the city increased from six to nine. Also created were the 8th and 9th wards.

== Past alders ==
The current alderperson for the 7th ward is Gregory Mitchell, who has represented the ward since 2015.

=== Before 1923 ===
Before 1923, wards were represented by two aldermen.

Aldermen					# Council	Aldermen				
Alderman	Term in office	Party	Notes	Cite	# Council	Alderman	Term in office	Party	Notes	Cite
Elihu Granger	1847–1848		Redistricted from 4th ward		11th	Charles Sloan	1847–1849			
Peter Turbot	1848–1850				12th	Charles Sloan	1847–1849			
Peter Turbot	1848–1850				13th	George Brady	1849–1851		Previously served in the 5th ward	
Elihu Granger	1850–1852				13th	George Brady	1849–1851		Previously served in the 5th ward	
Elihu Granger	1850–1852				14th	George Brady	1849–1851		Previously served in the 5th ward	
Elihu Granger	1850–1852				15th	Charles E. Moore	1851–1853			
Elihu Granger	1850–1852				16th	Charles E. Moore	1851–1853			
Ezra Taylor	1853–1854				16th	Charles E. Moore	1851–1853			
Ezra Taylor	1853–1854				17th	Maurice Evans	1853			
Ezra Taylor	1853–1854				17th	Michael O'Neil	1853–1855			
Elihu Granger	1854–1856				18th	Michael O'Neil	1853–1855			
Elihu Granger	1854–1856				19th	James J.H. Howe	1855–1857		Previously served in 6th ward	
John Dempsey	1856–1858				20th	James J.H. Howe	1855–1857		Previously served in 6th ward	
John Dempsey	1856–1858				21st	John Dunlap	1957–1859			
Henry Wendt	1958–1860				22nd	John Dunlap	1957–1859			
Henry Wendt	1958–1860				23rd	John Alston	1859–1861			
Gurdon Saltonstall Hubbard	1860– 1862				24th	John Alston	1859–1861			
Gurdon Saltonstall Hubbard	1860– 1862				25th	Alonzo Harvey	1861–1863			
James Conlan	1862–1863		Redistricted to 15th ward in 1863		26th	Alonzo Harvey	1861–1863			
James E. Abbott	1863–1864				27th	John Comiskey	1863–1865	Democratic	Redistricted from 10th ward; later elected alderman again in 1867 in 8th ward	
Joseph Sherwin	1864–1866				28th	John Comiskey	1863–1865	Democratic	Redistricted from 10th ward; later elected alderman again in 1867 in 8th ward	
Joseph Sherwin	1864–1866				29th	Avery Moore	1865–1867		Later elected alderman again in 1872 in 13th ward	
Max Schuler	1866–1868				30th	Avery Moore	1865–1867		Later elected alderman again in 1872 in 13th ward	
Max Schuler	1866–1868				31st	John Macalister	1867–1869			
James H. Hildreth	1868–1869		Redistricted to 8th ward in 1869		32nd	John Macalister	1867–1869			
James H. Hildreth	1868–1869		Redistricted to 8th ward in 1869		33rd	John Macalister	1867–1869			
William Batterman	1869–1871				34th	P.J. Hickey	1869–1872			
William Batterman	1869–1871				35th	P.J. Hickey	1869–1872			
Edward Cullerton	1871–1876	Democratic	Redistricted to 6th ward in 1876		36th	P.J. Hickey	1869–1872			
Edward Cullerton	1871–1876	Democratic	Redistricted to 6th ward in 1876		37th	Patrick McClory	1872–1876			
Edward Cullerton	1871–1876	Democratic	Redistricted to 6th ward in 1876		38th	Patrick McClory	1872–1876			
Edward Cullerton	1871–1876	Democratic	Redistricted to 6th ward in 1876		39th	Patrick McClory	1872–1876			
James H. Hildreth	1876–1877		Redistricted from 8th ward		40th	Henry Keber	1876–1878			
James H. Hildreth	1876–1877		Redistricted from 8th ward		41st	Henry Keber	1876–1878			
John Riordan	1878–1885	Democratic			42nd	John McNally	1878–1880			
John Riordan	1878–1885	Democratic			43rd	John McNally	1878–1880			
John Riordan	1878–1885	Democratic			44th	James H. Hildreth	1880–1888	Democratic		
John Riordan	1878–1885	Democratic			45th	James H. Hildreth	1880–1888	Democratic		
John Riordan	1878–1885	Democratic			46th	James H. Hildreth	1880–1888	Democratic		
John Riordan	1878–1885	Democratic			47th	James H. Hildreth	1880–1888	Democratic		
John Riordan	1878–1885	Democratic			48th	James H. Hildreth	1880–1888	Democratic		
Joseph M. Weber	1885–1888	Republican	Redistricted to 8th ward in 1888		49th	James H. Hildreth	1880–1888	Democratic		
Joseph M. Weber	1885–1888	Republican	Redistricted to 8th ward in 1888		50th	James H. Hildreth	1880–1888	Democratic		
Joseph M. Weber	1885–1888	Republican	Redistricted to 8th ward in 1888		51st	James H. Hildreth	1880–1888	Democratic		
William Love	1888–1890				52nd	William J. Murphy	1888–1893			
William Love	1888–1890				53rd	William J. Murphy	1888–1893			
John A. Cooke	1890–1896	Republican			54th	William J. Murphy	1888–1893			
John A. Cooke	1890–1896	Republican			55th	William J. Murphy	1888–1893			
John A. Cooke	1890–1896	Republican			56th	William J. Murphy	1888–1893			
John A. Cooke	1890–1896	Republican			57th	William J. O'Neill	1893–1895			
John A. Cooke	1890–1896	Republican			58th	William J. O'Neill	1893–1895			
John A. Cooke	1890–1896	Republican			59th	Edward Haas	1895–1897			
Nathan T. Brenner	1896–1898				60th	Edward Haas	1895–1897			
Nathan T. Brenner	1896–1898				61st	William J. Murphy	1897–1899			
Henry F. Fick	1898–1901		Redistricted to 9th ward in 1901		62nd	William J. Murphy	1897–1899			
Henry F. Fick	1898–1901		Redistricted to 9th ward in 1901		63rd	Nathan T. Brenner	1899–1901		Redistricted to 9th ward in 1901	
Henry F. Fick	1898–1901		Redistricted to 9th ward in 1901		64th	Nathan T. Brenner	1899–1901		Redistricted to 9th ward in 1901	
Frank I. Bennett	1901–1909	Republican	Redistricted from 34th ward; died in office		65th	—N/a				
Frank I. Bennett	1901–1909	Republican	Redistricted from 34th ward; died in office		66th	Bernard W. Snow	1902–1912	Republican		
Frank I. Bennett	1901–1909	Republican	Redistricted from 34th ward; died in office		67th	Bernard W. Snow	1902–1912	Republican		
Frank I. Bennett	1901–1909	Republican	Redistricted from 34th ward; died in office		68th	Bernard W. Snow	1902–1912	Republican		
Frank I. Bennett	1901–1909	Republican	Redistricted from 34th ward; died in office		69th	Bernard W. Snow	1902–1912	Republican		
Frank I. Bennett	1901–1909	Republican	Redistricted from 34th ward; died in office		70th	Bernard W. Snow	1902–1912	Republican		
Frank I. Bennett	1901–1909	Republican	Redistricted from 34th ward; died in office		71st	Bernard W. Snow	1902–1912	Republican		
Frank I. Bennett	1901–1909	Republican	Redistricted from 34th ward; died in office		72nd	Bernard W. Snow	1902–1912	Republican		
Charles E. Merriam	1909–1911	Republican			73rd	Bernard W. Snow	1902–1912	Republican		
Charles E. Merriam	1909–1911	Republican			74th	Bernard W. Snow	1902–1912	Republican		
Willis O. Nance	1911–1912		Redistricted to 6th ward in 1912		75th	Bernard W. Snow	1902–1912	Republican		
—N/a					76th	John H. Helwig	1912–1914			
Charles E. Merriam	1913–1917	Independent	Previously represented same ward		77th	John H. Helwig	1912–1914			
Charles E. Merriam	1913–1917	Independent	Previously represented same ward		78th	John N. Kimball	1914–1918			
Charles E. Merriam	1913–1917	Independent	Previously represented same ward		79th	John N. Kimball	1914–1918			
Charles E. Merriam	1913–1917	Independent	Previously represented same ward		80th	John N. Kimball	1914–1918			
William R. Fetzer	1917–1920??	Republican			81st	John N. Kimball	1914–1918			
William R. Fetzer	1917–1920??	Republican			82nd	Guy Guernsey	1918–1923	Republican	Continued as alderman after 1923, but redistricted to 6th ward	
William R. Fetzer	1917–1920??	Republican			83rd	Guy Guernsey	1918–1923	Republican	Continued as alderman after 1923, but redistricted to 6th ward	
—N/a					84th	Guy Guernsey	1918–1923	Republican	Continued as alderman after 1923, but redistricted to 6th ward	
—N/a					85th	Guy Guernsey	1918–1923	Republican	Continued as alderman after 1923, but redistricted to 6th ward	
—N/a					86th	Guy Guernsey	1918–1923	Republican	Continued as alderman after 1923, but redistricted to 6th ward	

=== Since 1923 ===
Since 1923, wards have been represented by a single alderman. Elections have also been nonpartisan, though officeholders often still publicly affiliate with parties.

Alderperson	Term in office	Party	Notes	Cite
Ross A. Woodhull	1923–1928		redistricted from 8th ward; resigned from office	
Clement A. Nance	1929–1931			
Barnet Hodes	1931–1933			
Thomas J. Daley	1933–1937	Democratic		
Nicholas J. Bohling	1943–1971	Republican	Resigned in order to accept an appointed judgeship	
Robert S. Wilinski	1972–1973		Did not seek re-election after being redistricted outside of the ward's boundaries	
Gerald E. Jones	1973–1975			
Robert S. Wilinski	1975–1979		Previously represented the same ward	
Joseph G. Bertand	1979–1983			
William Beavers	1983–2006	Democratic	Resigned in order to take office as a member of the Cook County Board of Commissioners	
Darcel Beavers	2006–2007	Democratic	Appointed by Mayor Richard M. Daley	
Sandi Jackson	2007–2013	Democratic	Resigned while under criminal indictment	
Natashia Holmes	2013–15	Democratic	Appointed by Mayor Rahm Emanuel	
Gregory Mitchell	2015–present	Democratic		
