= 6th ward, Chicago =

Ward in Chicago

6th Ward - Chicago
- Ward
- Ward 6
- Current Chicago ward map, with 6th ward highlighted in red
- Country: United States
- State: Illinois
- County: Cook
- City: Chicago
- Established: 1837
- Communities: list

Government
  - Type: Ward
  - Body: Chicago City Council
  - Alderperson: William Hall (Democratic Party)

The 6th Ward is one of the 50 aldermanic wards with representation in the City Council of Chicago, Illinois.

== History ==
=== 19th century ===
At its incorporation as a city in 1837, Chicago was divided into six wards. The 6th ward represented areas north of the Chicago River, and east of North Clark Street. Beginning February 16, 1847 (when the city increased its number of wards to nine), the ward represented areas west of the Chicago River and north of Randolph Street. The Illinois and Michigan Canal was completed in 1848, running through the district.

Beginning February 16, 1857 (when the city increased its number of wards to ten), the ward represented areas of Chicago's West Side that were to the north of West Randolph Street. Beginning in 1863 (when the city increased its number of wards to sixteen) the ward was bounded by Van Buren Street (at its north), Jefferson Street (at its east), and the south branch of the Chicago River (at its south).

Beginning in 1869 (when the city expanded its number of wards to twenty), the "6th ward" numbering was given to a ward which represented much of the area that had been in the previous incarnation of the 7th ward. The ward's northern boundaries were defined by 16th street and the south branch of the Chicago River (including a segment of the Chicago Sanitary and Ship Canal). Its southern boundary was defined by Egan Street (the former 39th Street, which was later renamed Pershing Road). Its eastern boundary was defined by Clark Street. This district was on the South Side. Located within its boundaries were the neighborhoods of Bridgeport, Mt. Pleasant (today known asM McKinley Park), as well as the area that is today home to the Armour Square neighborhood (including the land today occupied by Wentworth Gardens and Rate Field, and Chinatown).

Beginning on March 22, 1876 (when the city decreased the number of wards to 18) the district's boundaries were defined at its north by 16th street as well as the South Branch of the Chicago river (including a portion of the Chicago Sanitary and Ship Canal); at its east by the city limits (the lakeshore), at its south by Pulaski Road/40th Avenue, and at its west by the city limits and the south branch of the Chicago River. This included all of the areas that had been in 1869 incarnation of the district, and also included further territory. The new territory added to the ward included Oakland, the area that is today known as "Douglas", and the Near South Side.

Beginning in 1890 (when Chicago expanded its number of wards to thirty-four) the ward's boundaries were defined at its north by 33rd street and portions of the Chicago Sanitary and Ship Canal (along the south branch of the Chicago River); on its east by Halsted Street, on its south by 39th Street (today known as "Pershing Road"); and on its west by Western Boulevard. This contained the Mt. Pleasant neighborhood (today known as McKinley Park) and a portion of the Bridgeport neighborhood.

== Past alders ==
The current alderperson for the 6th ward is William Hall.

=== Before 1923 ===
Before 1923, wards were represented by two aldermen.

Aldermen					# Council	Aldermen				
Alderman	Term in office	Party	Notes	Cite	# Council	Alderman	Term in office	Party	Notes	Cite
Samuel Jackson	1837–1838				1st	Bernard Ward	1837–1838			
George W. Dole	1838–1839				2nd	Grant Goodrich	1838–1839			
John H. Kinzie	1839–1840		Later elected alderman again in 1852 in 9th ward		3rd	Buckner Stith Morris	1839–1840	Whig		
R.J. Hamilton	1840–1841	Democratic	Later elected in 1849 in the 9th ward		4th	William B. Ogden	1840–1841	Democratic	Later elected alderman again in 1947 in 9th ward	
George F. Foster	1841–1842		Later elected alderman again in 1850 in 8th ward		5th	James J.H. Howe	1841–1842		Later elected alderman again in 1855 in 7th ward	
George O. Bryan	1842–1843				6th	George W. Dole	1842–1844			
J. Marback	1843–1844				7th	George W. Dole	1842–1844			
Michael Diversey	1844–1845		Later elected alderman again in 1856 in 9th ward		8th	Buckner Stith Morris	1844			
Michael Diversey	1844–1845		Later elected alderman again in 1856 in 9th ward		8th	James H. Rees	1844–1845			
Mahlon D. Ogden	1845–1846		Later elected alderman again in 1871 in 19th ward		9th	Richard C. Ross	1845–1847			
William M. Larrabee	1846–1847				10th	Richard C. Ross	1845–1847			
Asahel Pierce	1847–1849		Previously served in 4th ward		11th	Henry Smith	1847–1849			
Asahel Pierce	1847–1849		Previously served in 4th ward		12th	Henry Smith	1847–1849			
Asahel Pierce	1847–1849		Previously served in 4th ward		13th	G.W. Wentworth	1849–1851			
Daniel Richards	1849–1851				13th	G.W. Wentworth	1849–1851			
Daniel Richards	1849–1851				14th	G.W. Wentworth	1849–1851			
Daniel Elston	1851–1852				15th	James M. Hannah	1851			
Daniel Elston	1851–1852				15th	Read A. Williams	1851–1852			
A.C. Ellithorpe	1852				16th	Henry Smith	1852–1853			
Thomas B. Dywer	1852–1854					Henry Smith	1852–1853			
Thomas B. Dywer	1852–1854				17th	William Carpenter	1853–1855			
William Wayman	1854–1856				18th	William Carpenter	1853–1855			
William Wayman	1854–1856				19th	A.C. Ellithorpe	1855–1857			
Henry Greenbaum	1856–1858	Republican			20th	A.C. Ellithorpe	1855–1857			
Henry Greenbaum	1856–1858	Republican			21st	George Sitts	1857–1859			
John Van Horn	1858–1860				22nd	George Sitts	1857–1859			
John Van Horn	1858–1860				23rd	C.A. Reno	1859–1861			
James W. Cobb	1860–1862				24th	C.A. Reno	1859–1861			
James W. Cobb	1860–1862				25th	Edward S. Salomon	1861–1863	Republican		
Francis C. Brown	1862–1863		Redistricted to 9th ward in 1863		26th	Edward S. Salomon	1861–1863	Republican		
Malcolm McDonald	1863–1864		Previously served in 10th ward		27th	David Walsh	1863–1865			
John Wallwork	1864–1868				28th	David Walsh	1863–1865			
John Wallwork	1864–1868				29th	Thomas C. Hatch	1865–1867			
John Wallwork	1864–1868				30th	Thomas C. Hatch	1865–1867			
John Wallwork	1864–1868				31st	David Walsh	1867–1869			
Michael Keeley	1868–1869				32nd	David Walsh	1867–1869			
Michael Keeley	1868–1869				33rd	David Walsh	1867–1869			
Mark Sheridan	1869–1870		Redistricted from 5th ward; later elected alderman again in 1876 in 5th ward		34th	William Tracy	1869–1873			
Daniel Heenan	1870				34th	William Tracy	1869–1873			
Michael Schmitz	1870–1874				35th	William Tracy	1869–1873			
Michael Schmitz	1870–1874				36th	William Tracy	1869–1873			
Michael Schmitz	1870–1874				37th	William Tracy	1869–1873			
Michael Schmitz	1870–1874				38th	Phillip Reidy	1873–1976			<
Fred Sommer	1874–1876		Redistricted to 5th ward in 1876		39th	Phillip Reidy	1873–1976			<
Edward Cullerton	1876–1888	Democratic	Redistricted from 7th ward, redistricted to 9th ward in 1888		40th	Fred Lodding	1876–1879			
Edward Cullerton	1876–1888	Democratic	Redistricted from 7th ward, redistricted to 9th ward in 1888		41st	Fred Lodding	1876–1879			
Edward Cullerton	1876–1888	Democratic	Redistricted from 7th ward, redistricted to 9th ward in 1888		42nd	Fred Lodding	1876–1879			
Edward Cullerton	1876–1888	Democratic	Redistricted from 7th ward, redistricted to 9th ward in 1888		43rd	John J. Altpeter	1879–1883	Socialist Labor		
Edward Cullerton	1876–1888	Democratic	Redistricted from 7th ward, redistricted to 9th ward in 1888		44th	John J. Altpeter	1879–1883	Socialist Labor		
Edward Cullerton	1876–1888	Democratic	Redistricted from 7th ward, redistricted to 9th ward in 1888		45th	John J. Altpeter	1879–1883	Republican and Socialist Labor		
Edward Cullerton	1876–1888	Democratic	Redistricted from 7th ward, redistricted to 9th ward in 1888		46th	John J. Altpeter	1879–1883	Republican and Socialist Labor		
Edward Cullerton	1876–1888	Democratic	Redistricted from 7th ward, redistricted to 9th ward in 1888		47th	Charles F. L. Doerner	1883–1887	Democratic		
Edward Cullerton	1876–1888	Democratic	Redistricted from 7th ward, redistricted to 9th ward in 1888		48th	Charles F. L. Doerner	1883–1887	Democratic		
Edward Cullerton	1876–1888	Democratic	Redistricted from 7th ward, redistricted to 9th ward in 1888		49th	Charles F. L. Doerner	1883–1887	Democratic		
Edward Cullerton	1876–1888	Democratic	Redistricted from 7th ward, redistricted to 9th ward in 1888		50th	Charles F. L. Doerner	1883–1887	Democratic		
Edward Cullerton	1876–1888	Democratic	Redistricted from 7th ward, redistricted to 9th ward in 1888		51st	Charles A. Monear	1887–1888	Independent Democrat	Redistricted in 1888 to 8th ward	
Edward P. Burke	1888–1892		Previously served as alderman in the 5th ward		52nd	George Emmerich	1888–1889			
Edward P. Burke	1888–1892		Previously served as alderman in the 5th ward		53rd	William H. O'Brien	1889–1893			
Edward P. Burke	1888–1892		Previously served as alderman in the 5th ward		54th	William H. O'Brien	1889–1893			
Edward P. Burke	1888–1892		Previously served as alderman in the 5th ward		55th	William H. O'Brien	1889–1893			
Henry Stuckart	1892–1894		later represented same ward again		56th	William H. O'Brien	1889–1893			
Henry Stuckart	1892–1894		later represented same ward again		57th	Thomas Reed	1893–1895			
Charles Martin	1894–1901	Democratic	Redistricted to 5th ward in 1901		58th	Thomas Reed	1893–1895			
Charles Martin	1894–1901	Democratic	Redistricted to 5th ward in 1901		59th	Henry Stuckart	1895–1897		previously had represented the same ward; later represented the 4th ward	
Charles Martin	1894–1901	Democratic	Redistricted to 5th ward in 1901		60th	Henry Stuckart	1895–1897		previously had represented the same ward; later represented the 4th ward	
Charles Martin	1894–1901	Democratic	Redistricted to 5th ward in 1901		61st	William H. O'Brien	1897–1899			
Charles Martin	1894–1901	Democratic	Redistricted to 5th ward in 1901		62nd	William H. O'Brien	1897–1899			
Charles Martin	1894–1901	Democratic	Redistricted to 5th ward in 1901		63rd	James J. McCormick	1899–1901		Later elected alderman again in 1904 in the 5th ward	
Charles Martin	1894–1901	Democratic	Redistricted to 5th ward in 1901		64th	James J. McCormick	1899–1901		Later elected alderman again in 1904 in the 5th ward	
William Mavor	1901–1904	Republican	Redistricted from 32nd ward; Died in office		65th	Linn H. Young	1901–1909	Republican		
William Mavor	1901–1904	Republican	Redistricted from 32nd ward; Died in office		66th	Linn H. Young	1901–1909	Republican		
William Mavor	1901–1904	Republican	Redistricted from 32nd ward; Died in office		67th	Linn H. Young	1901–1909	Republican		
Edward C. Potter	1904–1906	Independent Republican			68th	Linn H. Young	1901–1909	Republican		
Edward C. Potter	1904–1906	Independent Republican			69th	Linn H. Young	1901–1909	Republican		
Arthur S. McCoid	1906–1910				70th	Linn H. Young	1901–1909	Republican		
Arthur S. McCoid	1906–1910				71st	Linn H. Young	1901–1909	Republican		
Arthur S. McCoid	1906–1910				72nd	Linn H. Young	1901–1909	Republican		
Arthur S. McCoid	1906–1910				73rd	Theodore K. Long	1909–1915			
William R. Parker	1910–1912				74th	Theodore K. Long	1909–1915			
William R. Parker	1910–1912				75th	Theodore K. Long	1909–1915			
Willis O. Nance	1912–1918	Republican			76th	Theodore K. Long	1909–1915			
Willis O. Nance	1912–1918	Republican			77th	Theodore K. Long	1909–1915			
Willis O. Nance	1912–1918	Republican			78th	Theodore K. Long	1909–1915			
Willis O. Nance	1912–1918	Republican			79th	Alexander A. McCormick	1915–1921	Republican		
Willis O. Nance	1912–1918	Republican			80th	Alexander A. McCormick	1915–1921	Republican		
Willis O. Nance	1912–1918	Republican			81st	Alexander A. McCormick	1915–1921	Republican		
Willis O. Nance	1912–1918	Republican			82nd	Alexander A. McCormick	1915–1921	Republican		
Willis O. Nance	1912–1918	Republican			83rd	Alexander A. McCormick	1915–1921	Republican		
Charles S. Eaton	1919–1923	Republican	Continued as alderman after 1923, but redistricted to 5th ward		84th	Alexander A. McCormick	1915–1921	Republican		
Charles S. Eaton	1919–1923	Republican	Continued as alderman after 1923, but redistricted to 5th ward		85th	Alexander A. McCormick	1915–1921	Republican		
Charles S. Eaton	1919–1923	Republican	Continued as alderman after 1923, but redistricted to 5th ward		86th					

=== Since 1923 ===
Since 1923, wards have been represented by a single alderman. Elections have also been nonpartisan, though officeholders often still publicly affiliate with parties.

Alderman		Term in office	Councils served in	Party	Notes	Cite
	Guy Guernsey			Republican	Redistricted from the 7th ward	
	John F. Healy			Democratic		
	Patrick Sheridan Smith					
	Francis J. Hogan					
	David R. Muir	1951-1955				
	Sydney A. Jones Jr.	1955-1959				
	Robert H. Miller	1959-1967				
	A. A. Rayner Jr.	1967–1971	98th		Retired after one term	
	Eugene Sawyer	February 28, 1971 – December 2, 1987	98th-103rd	Democratic	Resigned after appointment as 53rd Mayor of Chicago after the death of Harold Washington.	
	Ronald Robinson	1987–1989	103rd	Democratic	Appointed as Sawyer's successor by Sawyer himself	
	John O. Steele	1989–December 1997	103rd-105th	Democratic	Elected in a special election; resigned after being appointed an associate judge for the Cook County Circuit Court in December 1997	
n	Freddrenna Lyle	February 8, 1998 – May 16, 2011	105th–109th	Democratic	Appointed by Mayor Richard M. Daley in 1998; subsequently elected to three full terms; lost re-election in 2011	
	Roderick Sawyer	May 16, 2011 – May 15, 2023	110th–113th	Democratic	Son of former seatholder Eugene Sawyer, resigned in 2023 to run for mayor	
	William Hall	May 15, 2023–present	114th, 115th	Democratic		
