= 10th ward, Chicago =

Ward in Chicago

10th Ward - Chicago
- Ward
- Ward 10
- Current Chicago ward map, with 10th ward highlighted in red
- Country: United States
- State: Illinois
- County: Cook
- City: Chicago
- Established: 1857
- Communities: list

Government
  - Type: Ward
  - Body: Chicago City Council
  - Alderperson: Peter Chico (Democratic Party)

The 10th Ward is one of the 50 aldermanic wards with representation in the City Council of Chicago, Illinois.

== History ==
Ward (highlighted) on an 1895 ward map

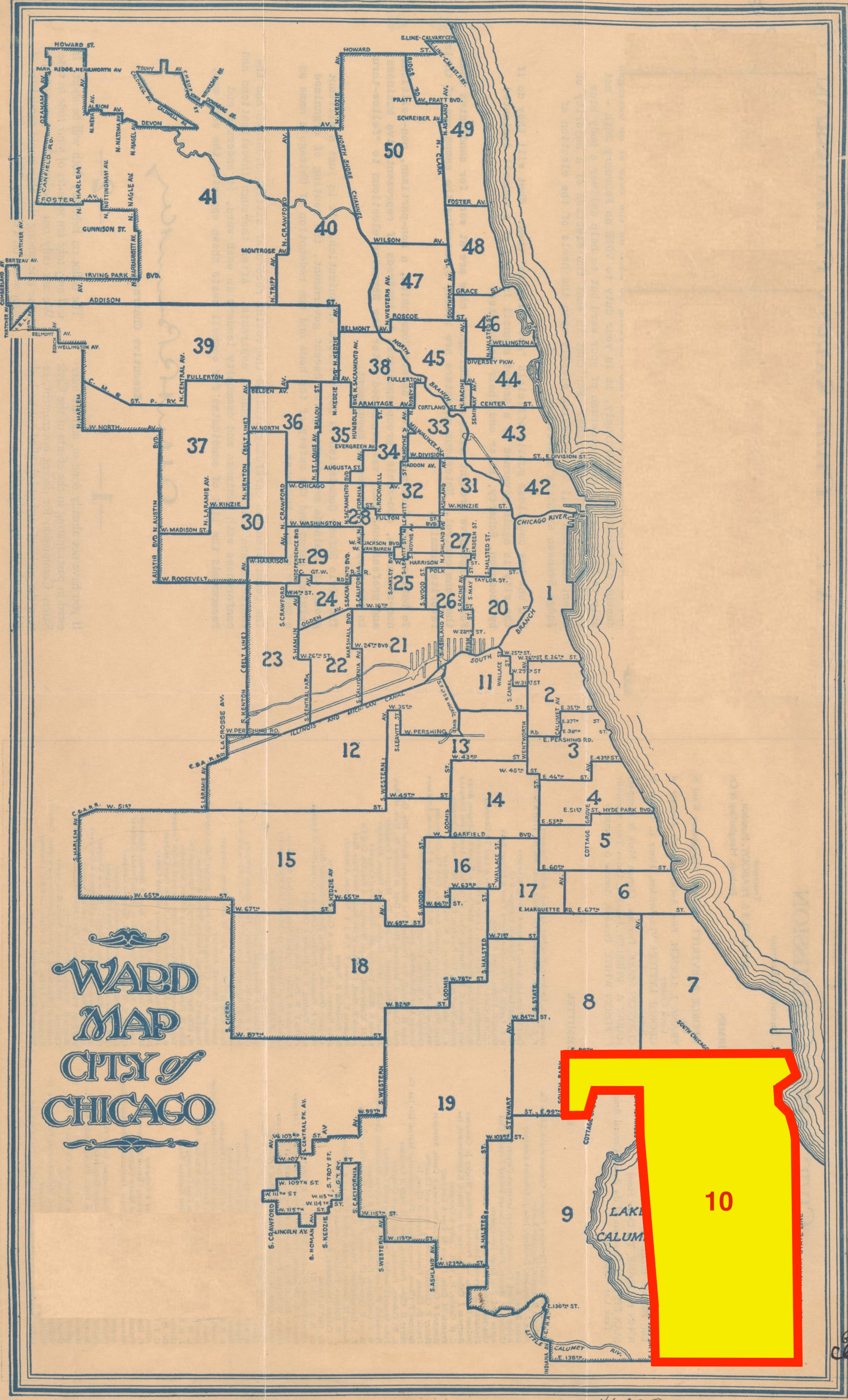
Ward (highlighted) on a 1929 ward map

Ward boundaries used for the 2015 and 2019 aldermanic elections

The ward was created on February 16, 1857, when the number of wards in the city increased from nine to ten.

== Past alders ==
The current alderperson for the 10th ward is Peter Chico, who has represented the ward since 2023.

=== Before 1923 ===
Before 1923, wards were represented by two aldermen.

Aldermen					# Council	Aldermen				
Alderman	Term in office	Party	Notes	Cite	# Council	Alderman	Term in office	Party	Notes	Cite
Dennis Coughlin	1857–1859				21st	J. Schmidt	1857–1858			
Dennis Coughlin	1857–1859				22nd	Andrew Enzenbacher	1858–1860			
John Comiskey	1859–1863	Democratic	Redistricted to 7th ward in 1863		23rd	Andrew Enzenbacher	1858–1860			
John Comiskey	1859–1863	Democratic	Redistricted to 7th ward in 1863		24th	Malcolm McDonald	1860–1862		Later elected alderman again in 1963 in 6th ward	
John Comiskey	1859–1863	Democratic	Redistricted to 7th ward in 1863		25th	Malcolm McDonald	1860–1862		Later elected alderman again in 1963 in 6th ward	
John Comiskey	1859–1863	Democratic	Redistricted to 7th ward in 1863		26th	Redmond Sheridan	1862–1863		Redistricted to 8th ward in 1863	
George Hilmrod	1863–1865				27th	Charles C. P. Holden	1863–1872	Republican	Redistricted from 5th ward in 1863	
George Hilmrod	1863–1865				28th	Charles C. P. Holden	1863–1872	Republican	Redistricted from 5th ward in 1863	
Edmund Bixby	1865–1867		Died in office		29th	Charles C. P. Holden	1863–1872	Republican	Redistricted from 5th ward in 1863	
Edmund Bixby	1865–1867		Died in office		30th	Charles C. P. Holden	1863–1872	Republican	Redistricted from 5th ward in 1863	
Edmund Bixby	1865–1867		Died in office		31st	Charles C. P. Holden	1863–1872	Republican	Redistricted from 5th ward in 1863	
Alvin Salisbury	1868–1869				32nd	Charles C. P. Holden	1863–1872	Republican	Redistricted from 5th ward in 1863	
Alvin Salisbury	1868–1869				33rd	Charles C. P. Holden	1863–1872	Republican	Redistricted from 5th ward in 1863	
Thomas Wilco	1869–1871				34th	Charles C. P. Holden	1863–1872	Republican	Redistricted from 5th ward in 1863	
Thomas Wilco	1869–1871				35th	Charles C. P. Holden	1863–1872	Republican	Redistricted from 5th ward in 1863	
Lester L. Bond	1871–1873	Republican	Previously represented 11th ward; served as acting mayor in 1873		36th	Charles C. P. Holden	1863–1872	Republican	Redistricted from 5th ward in 1863	
Lester L. Bond	1871–1873	Republican	Previously represented 11th ward; served as acting mayor in 1873		37th	David W. Clark Jr.	1872–1875			
Charles L. Woodman	1873–1876		Redistricted from 20th ward		38th	David W. Clark Jr.	1872–1875			
Charles L. Woodman	1873–1876		Redistricted from 20th ward		39th	David W. Clark Jr.	1872–1875			
George E. White	1876–1878	Republican	Redistricted from 11th ward		40th	Andrew F. Smith	1876–1877			
George E. White	1876–1878	Republican	Redistricted from 11th ward		41st	Michael McNurney	1877–1881	Republican		
John Eiszner	1878–1880				42nd	Michael McNurney	1877–1881	Republican		
John Eiszner	1878–1880				43rd	Michael McNurney	1877–1881	Republican		
H. Schroeder	1880–1882	Democratic			44th	Michael McNurney	1877–1881	Republican		
H. Schroeder	1880–1882	Democratic			45th	Daniel Nelson	1881–1883	Republican		
George E. White	1882–1884	Republican			46th	Daniel Nelson	1881–1883	Republican		
George E. White	1882–1884	Republican			47th	James Walsh	1883–1885	Democratic	Previously served in 11th ward; later elected alderman again in 1897 in 17th ward	
Michael McNurney	1884–1886	Republican			48th	James Walsh	1883–1885	Democratic	Previously served in 11th ward; later elected alderman again in 1897 in 17th ward	
Michael McNurney	1884–1886	Republican			49th	Stephen P. Revere	1885–1887	Republican	Later elected alderman again in 1895 in 17th ward	
Henry M. Deal	1886–1888				50th	Stephen P. Revere	1885–1887	Republican	Later elected alderman again in 1895 in 17th ward	
Henry M. Deal	1886–1888				51st	J.N. Mulvihill	1887–1888		Redistricted to 17th ward in 1888	
Simon Walner	1888–1890				52nd	Augustus W. Nohe	1888–1889			
Simon Walner	1888–1890				53rd	Thomas McEnerny	1889–1891			
William Schwerin	1890–1892				54th	Thomas McEnerny	1889–1891			
William Schwerin	1890–1892				55th	John F. Dorman	1891–1895			
Charles C. Schumacher	1892–1894				56th	John F. Dorman	1891–1895			
Charles C. Schumacher	1892–1894				57th	John F. Dorman	1891–1895			
Fred C. Engel	1894–1896	Republican			58th	John F. Dorman	1891–1895			
Fred C. Engel	1894–1896	Republican			59th	Zina R. Carter	1895–1896	Republican		
August W. Miller	1896–1899				60th	Anton Novak	1896–1897			
August W. Miller	1896–1899				61st	Peter Biewer	1897–1899			
August W. Miller	1896–1899				62nd	Peter Biewer	1897–1899			
Michael Zimmer	1899		Later elected alderman again in 1901 in 12th ward		62nd	Peter Biewer	1897–1899			
William F. Brennan	1899–1901		Redistricted to 12th ward in 1901		63rd	Anton Novak	1899–1901			
William F. Brennan	1899–1901		Redistricted to 12th ward in 1901		64th	Anton Novak	1899–1901			
Edward J. Novak	1901–1904	Democratic	Redistricted from 8th ward		65th	Joseph Sindelar	1901–1902		Died in office	
Edward J. Novak	1901–1904	Democratic	Redistricted from 8th ward		66th	Charles G. Foucek	1902–1903	Republican		
Edward J. Novak	1901–1904	Democratic	Redistricted from 8th ward		67th	Jacob Sindelar	1903–1905			
Rudolph Hurt	1904–1910		Previously served in 9th ward		68th	Jacob Sindelar	1903–1905			
Rudolph Hurt	1904–1910		Previously served in 9th ward		69th	Thomas F. Scully	1905–1911	Democratic		
Rudolph Hurt	1904–1910		Previously served in 9th ward		70th	Thomas F. Scully	1905–1911	Democratic		
Rudolph Hurt	1904–1910		Previously served in 9th ward		71st	Thomas F. Scully	1905–1911	Democratic		
Rudolph Hurt	1904–1910		Previously served in 9th ward		72nd	Thomas F. Scully	1905–1911	Democratic		
Rudolph Hurt	1904–1910		Previously served in 9th ward		73rd	Thomas F. Scully	1905–1911	Democratic		
Frank J. Vavricek	1910–1914				74th	Thomas F. Scully	1905–1911	Democratic		
Frank J. Vavricek	1910–1914				75th	Frank Klaus	1911–1921	Democratic		
Frank J. Vavricek	1910–1914				76th	Frank Klaus	1911–1921	Democratic		
Frank J. Vavricek	1910–1914				77th	Frank Klaus	1911–1921	Democratic		
James McNichols	1914–1923	Democratic			78th	Frank Klaus	1911–1921	Democratic		
James McNichols	1914–1923	Democratic			79th	Frank Klaus	1911–1921	Democratic		
James McNichols	1914–1923	Democratic			80th	Frank Klaus	1911–1921	Democratic		
James McNichols	1914–1923	Democratic			81st	Frank Klaus	1911–1921	Democratic		
James McNichols	1914–1923	Democratic			82nd	Frank Klaus	1911–1921	Democratic		
James McNichols	1914–1923	Democratic			83rd	Frank Klaus	1911–1921	Democratic		
James McNichols	1914–1923	Democratic			84th	Frank Klaus	1911–1921	Democratic		
James McNichols	1914–1923	Democratic			85th	—N/a				
James McNichols	1914–1923	Democratic			86th	—N/a				

=== Since 1923 ===
Since 1923, wards have been represented by a single alderman. Elections have also been nonpartisan, though officeholders often still publicly affiliate with parties.

Alderperson	Term in office	Party	Notes	Cite
Ernest M. Cross	1923–1927	Republican	Redistricted from the 8th ward	
William A. Rowan	1927–1942	Democratic		
William J. Pieczynski	1943–1945		Died in office	
Emil V. Pacini	1945–1963			
John J. Buchanan	1963–1971		Lost re-election	
Edward Vrdolyak	1971–1987	Democratic		
Victor Vrdolyak	1987–1991	Democratic		
John J. Buchanan	1991–1999			
John Pope	1999–2015	Democratic	Lost re-election	
Susan Sadlowski Garza	2015–2023	Democratic		
Peter Chico	2023-present	Democratic		
