= Chicago City Council =

Legislative body

Type
- Type: Unicameral

History
- Founded: December 13, 1837; 188 years ago

Leadership
- Mayor: Brandon Johnson (D) since May 15, 2023
- Vice Mayor: Vacant since August 7, 2025
- President pro tempore: Sam Nugent (D) since May 15, 2023
- Floor Leader: Jason Ervin (D) since January 8, 2025
- Assistant President pro tempore: Stephanie Coleman (D) since May 15, 2023
- Secretary: Anna Valencia (D) since January 25, 2017

Structure
- Seats: 50
- Political groups: Democratic (48) (Note: Aldermanic elections are officially nonpartisan; party affiliations are informational only.); Independent (2)
- Length of term: 4 years

Elections
- Voting system: Two-round system
- Last election: 2023
- Next election: 2027

Meeting place
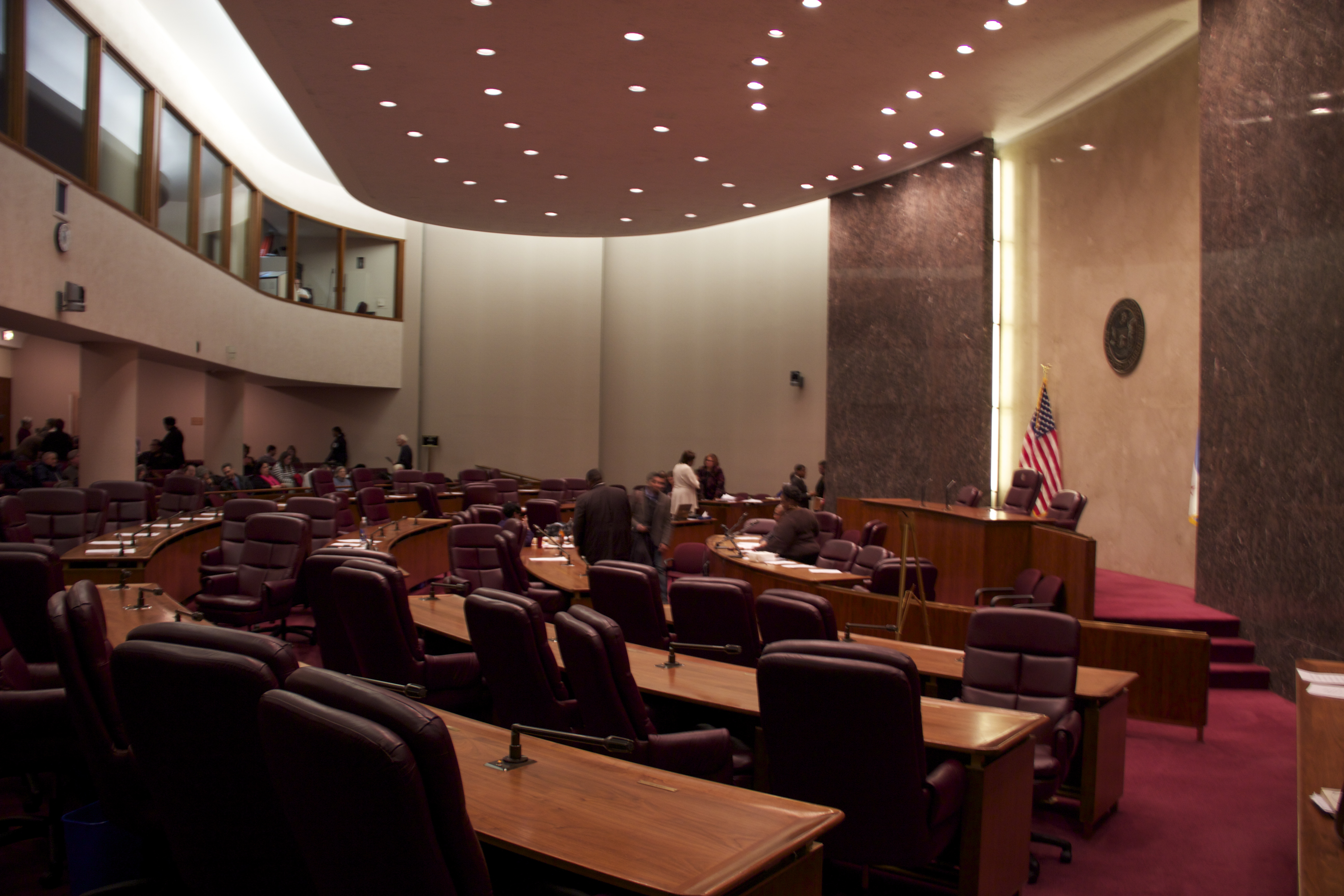
- Council Chambers in Chicago City Hall

The Chicago City Council is the legislative branch of the government of the city of Chicago in Illinois. It consists of 50 alderpersons elected from 50 wards to serve four-year terms. The council is called into session regularly, usually monthly, to consider ordinances, orders, and resolutions whose subject matter includes code changes, utilities, taxes, and many other issues. The Chicago City Council Chambers are located in Chicago City Hall, as are the downtown offices of the individual alderpersons and staff.

The presiding officer of the council is the mayor of Chicago, who is usually non-voting, except in rare cases, such as to break a tie. The secretary is the city clerk of Chicago. Both positions are city-wide elected offices. In the absence of the mayor, an alderperson is elected to the position of President Pro Tempore serves as the presiding officer.

Originally established as the Common Council in 1837, it was renamed to the City Council in 1876. The Council assumed its modern form of 50 wards electing one alderperson each in 1923.

== Composition ==
The most recent city council election was the 2023 Chicago aldermanic elections. The sitting term began on May 15, 2023.

Alderperson elections are officially nonpartisan; party affiliations below are informational only. Council members also self-organize into caucuses, or blocs that address particular issues. Active caucuses include the Black Caucus, Democratic Socialist Caucus, Latino Caucus, LGBT Caucus, and Progressive Reform Caucus.

Current composition of the Chicago City Council
Ward	Name	Start	Party	Main community areas (Note: Main community areas overlapping with the ward. Only community areas that make up 15% of the area of the ward or more are listed.)
1	Daniel La Spata	May 20, 2019	Democratic	West Town, Logan Square
2	Brian Hopkins	May 18, 2015	Democratic	Near North Side, Lincoln Park
3	Pat Dowell	May 21, 2007	Democratic	Grand Boulevard, Near South Side, Douglas
4	Lamont Robinson	May 15, 2023	Democratic	Douglas, Kenwood, Near South Side
5	Desmon Yancy	May 15, 2023	Democratic	Hyde Park, South Shore, Woodlawn
6	William Hall	May 15, 2023	Democratic	Greater Grand Crossing, Chatham
7	Greg Mitchell	May 18, 2015	Democratic	South Deering, South Chicago, South Shore
8	Michelle Harris	December 13, 2006 (Note: Date of appointment, not of first election.)	Democratic	Avalon Park, Pullman
9	Anthony Beale	May 3, 1999	Democratic	Roseland, West Pullman, Riverdale
10	Peter Chico	May 15, 2023	Democratic	South Deering, Hegewisch
11	Nicole Lee	March 28, 2022	Democratic	Bridgeport, New City, Armour Square
12	Julia Ramirez	May 15, 2023	Democratic	Brighton Park, McKinley Park, New City
13	Marty Quinn	May 16, 2011	Democratic	Clearing, Garfield Ridge
14	Jeylú Gutiérrez	May 15, 2023	Democratic	Archer Heights, Gage Park
15	Ray Lopez	May 18, 2015	Democratic	New City, Gage Park, West Englewood
16	Stephanie Coleman	May 20, 2019	Democratic	West Englewood, Englewood, Chicago Lawn
17	David Moore	May 18, 2015	Democratic	Auburn Gresham, West Englewood, Chicago Lawn
18	Derrick Curtis	May 18, 2015	Democratic	Ashburn
19	Matt O'Shea	May 16, 2011	Democratic	Beverly, Mount Greenwood, Morgan Park
20	Jeanette Taylor	May 20, 2019	Democratic	New City, Washington Park, Woodlawn
21	Ronnie Mosley	May 15, 2023	Democratic	Washington Heights, West Pullman, Morgan Park
22	Mike Rodriguez	May 20, 2019	Democratic	South Lawndale, Garfield Ridge
23	Silvana Tabares	June 28, 2018	Democratic	Garfield Ridge, West Lawn, West Elsdon
24	Monique Scott	June 22, 2022	Democratic	North Lawndale
25	Byron Sigcho-Lopez	May 20, 2019	Democratic	Lower West Side, South Lawndale
26	Jessie Fuentes	May 15, 2023	Democratic	Humboldt Park, West Town, Logan Square
27	Red Burnett	September 25, 2025	Democratic	Near West Side, West Town, Humboldt Park, Near North Side
28	Jason Ervin	January 13, 2011	Democratic	Near West Side, East Garfield Park, West Garfield Park
29	Chris Taliaferro	May 18, 2015	Democratic	Austin
30	Ruth Cruz	May 15, 2023	Democratic	Portage Park, Belmont Cragin, Irving Park
31	Felix Cardona	May 20, 2019	Democratic	Belmont Cragin, Hermosa
32	Scott Waguespack	May 21, 2007	Democratic	Logan Square, Lincoln Park, North Center
33	Rossana Rodríguez	May 20, 2019	Democratic	Albany Park, Irving Park
34	Bill Conway	May 15, 2023	Democratic	Near West Side, Loop
35	Anthony Quezada	April 7, 2025	Democratic	Avondale, Logan Square
36	Gil Villegas	May 18, 2015	Democratic	Belmont Cragin, West Town, Montclare
37	Emma Mitts	January 7, 2000	Democratic	Austin, Humboldt Park
38	Nick Sposato	May 16, 2011	Independent	Dunning, O'Hare, Portage Park
39	Sam Nugent	May 20, 2019	Democratic	North Park, Forest Glen
40	Andre Vasquez	May 20, 2019	Democratic	Lincoln Square, West Ridge
41	Anthony Napolitano	May 18, 2015	Independent	O'Hare, Norwood Park
42	Brendan Reilly	May 21, 2007	Democratic	Near North Side, Loop
43	Timmy Knudsen	September 21, 2022	Democratic	Lincoln Park
44	Bennett Lawson	May 15, 2023	Democratic	Lake View
45	Jim Gardiner	May 20, 2019	Democratic	Jefferson Park, Forest Glen, Portage Park
46	Angela Clay	May 15, 2023	Democratic	Uptown, Lake View
47	Matt Martin	May 20, 2019	Democratic	North Center, Lincoln Square, Lake View, Uptown
48	Leni Manaa-Hoppenworth	May 15, 2023	Democratic	Edgewater, Uptown
49	Maria Hadden	May 20, 2019	Democratic	Rogers Park
50	Debra Silverstein	May 16, 2011	Democratic	West Ridge

== Standing committees ==
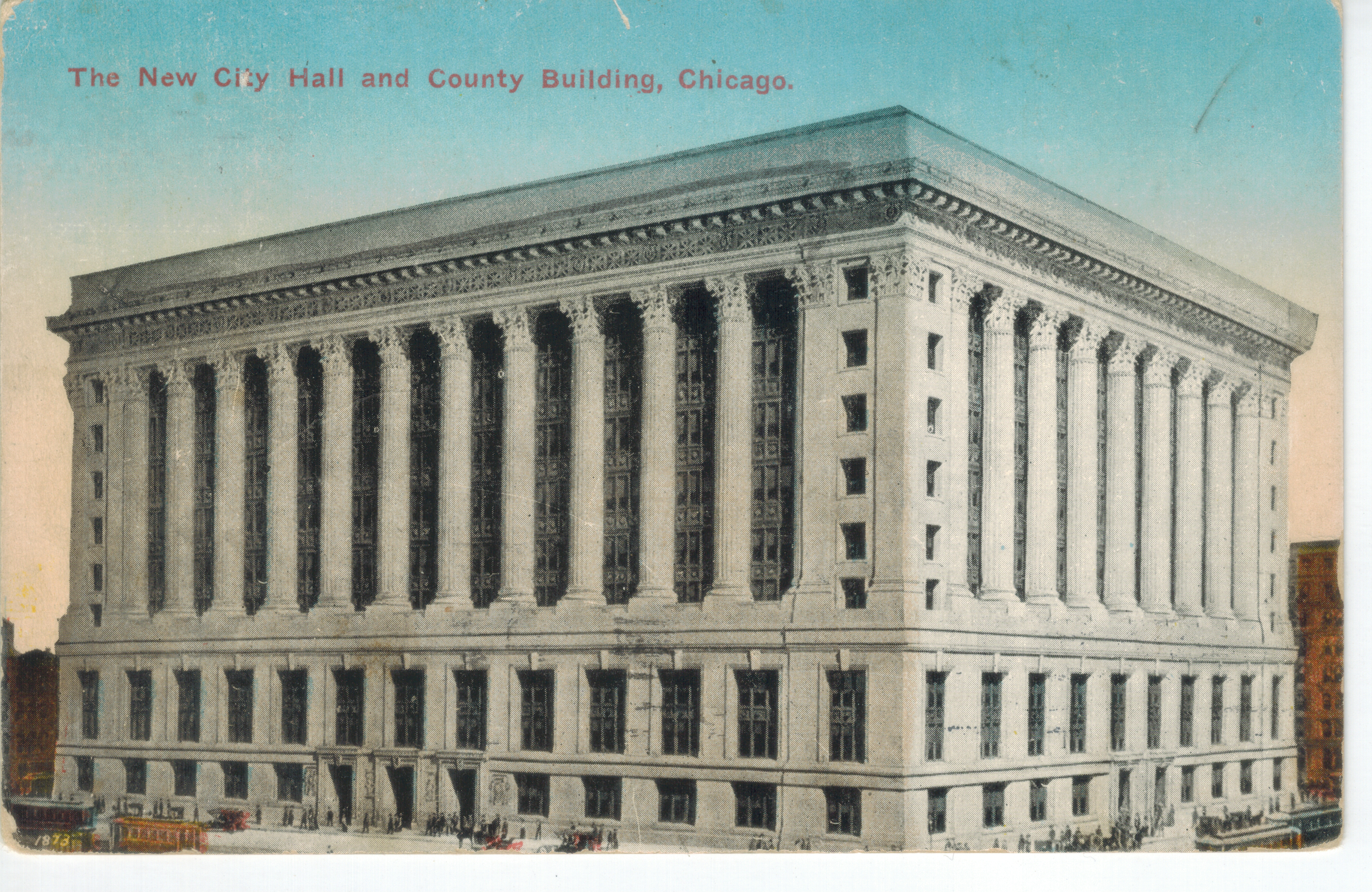
Chicago City Hall, 1914

The city council is internally organized into subject-specific standing committees. Once proposed legislation is drafted, it is assigned to a specific standing committee. After a hearing and deliberation process, the committee votes on whether to report the proposed legislation to the full council, along with recommendations.

The committees are created, and their leaders and members are selected, through a resolution passed by the whole council. Historically, mayors have played a central role in selecting committee chairs.

As of May 2023, a majority of incoming City Council members after the 2023 election had agreed to a plan for the following subcommittees and chair assignments:

Committee	Chair	Vice Chair
Aviation	Matt O'Shea	Derrick Curtis
Budget and Government Operations	Jason Ervin	Nicole Lee
Committees and Rules	Michelle Harris	William Hall
Contracting Oversight and Equity	Emma Mitts	Daniel La Spata
Economic, Capital and Technology Development	Derrick Curtis	Ronnie Mosley
Education and Child Development	Jeanette Taylor	Angela Clay
Environmental Protection and Energy	Maria Hadden	Timmy Knudsen
Ethics and Government Oversight	Matt Martin	Maria Hadden
Finance	Pat Dowell	Bill Conway
Revenue (subcommittee)	William Hall	Pat Dowell
Health and Human Relations	Rossana Rodríguez	Julia Ramirez
Housing and Real Estate	Byron Sigcho-Lopez	Greg Mitchell
Immigration and Refugee Rights	Andre Vasquez	Jeanette Taylor
License and Consumer Protection	Debra Silverstein	Peter Chico
Pedestrian and Traffic Safety	Daniel La Spata	Ruth Cruz
Police and Fire	Chris Taliaferro	Lamont Robinson
Public Safety	Brian Hopkins	Desmon Yancy
Special Events	Nick Sposato	Monique Scott
Transportation and Public Way	Greg Mitchell	Andre Vasquez
Workforce Development	Mike Rodriguez	Jeylú Gutiérrez
Youth Employment (subcommittee)	Jessie Fuentes	Mike Rodriguez
Zoning, Landmarks and Building Standards	Gil Villegas	Bennett Lawson

== History ==
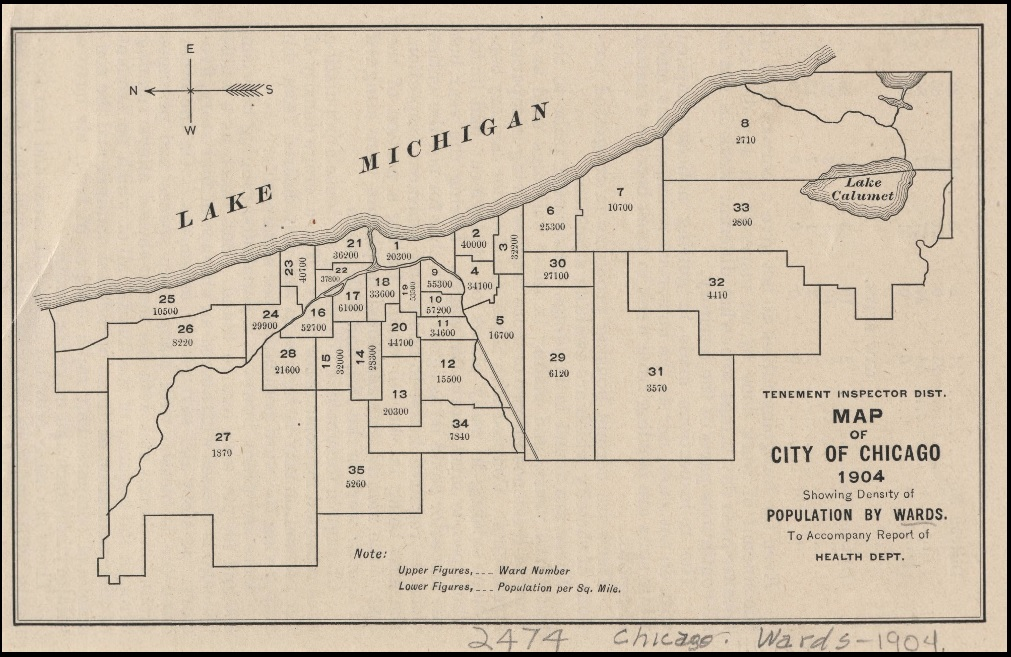
Map of city of Chicago ward system in 1904. Wards with lower populations have larger boundaries. External link: current map of Chicago wards

Chicago has been divided into wards since 1837, beginning with 6 wards. Until 1923, each ward elected two members to the city council. In 1923, the system that exists today was adopted with 50 wards, each with one council member elected by the ward. In accordance with Illinois state law, ward borders must be shifted after every federal census. This law is intended to give the population of the ward equal representation based by the size of the population of Chicago.

Chicago is unusual among major United States cities in the number of wards and representative alderpersons that it maintains. It has been noted that the current ward system promotes diverse ethnic and cultural representation on the city council.

In June 2021, the state of Illinois adopted a statute that changed the title of City Council members to alderperson (plural: alderpersons), replacing the gendered term aldermen. However, some members of City Council continue to use the term alderman or instead use alderwoman or alder.

=== Corruption ===
Chicago City Council Chambers has long been the center of public corruption in Chicago. The first conviction of Chicago alderpersons and Cook County Commissioners for accepting bribes to rig a crooked contract occurred in 1869. Between 1972 and 1999, 26 current or former Chicago alderpersons were convicted for official corruption. Between 1973 and 2012, 31 alderpersons were convicted of corruption. Approximately 100 alderpersons served in that period, which is a conviction rate of about one-third.

Fourteen of the Chicago's City Council's nineteen committees routinely violated the Illinois Open Meetings Act during the last four months of 2007 by not keeping adequate written records of their meetings. Chicago City Council committees violated the Illinois Open Meetings Act and their own rules by meeting and taking actions without a quorum at least four times over the same four-month span.

Over half of elected Chicago alderpersons took illegal campaign contributions totalling $282,000 in 2013.

== Election ==
Map of the 50 wards of the City of Chicago in use since 2023 (Interactive version)

Chicago alderpersons are elected by popular vote every four years, on the last Tuesday in February in the year following national mid-term elections. A run-off election, if no candidate garners more than fifty percent of the vote, is held on the first Tuesday in April. The election is held on a non-partisan basis. New terms begin at noon Central Time on the third Monday in May following the election.

== Authority and roles ==
The council, in conjunction with the Mayor of Chicago, hears recommendations from the Commission on Chicago Landmarks and then may grant individual properties Chicago Landmark status. The council also has the power to redraw ward boundaries, resulting in the heavily gerrymandered map seen today.

=== Law ===
The Journal of the Proceedings of the City Council of the City of Chicago is the official publication of the acts of the City Council. The Municipal Code of Chicago is the codification of Chicago's local ordinances of a general and permanent nature. Between May 18, 2011, and August 2011, the first 100 days of the first term of Mayor Rahm Emanuel, 2,845 ordinances and orders were introduced to the council.

=== Aldermanic privilege ===
Chicago's alderpersons are generally given exceptional deference, called "aldermanic privilege" or "aldermanic prerogative", to control city decisions and services within their ward. This is an unwritten and informal practice that emerged in the early 20th century and gives alderpersons control over "zoning, licenses, permits, property-tax reductions, city contracts and patronage jobs" in their wards. Political scientists have suggested that this facilitates corruption. The system has been described as "50 aldermen serving essentially as mayors of 50 wards."

== See also ==
- Council Wars, a period of conflict within the City Council
- Cook County Board of Commissioners
- Workingmen's Party of Illinois
- City Council elections in Chicago
- List of Chicago Alderpersons since 1923
