= 1863 Chicago mayoral election =

- April 21, 1863
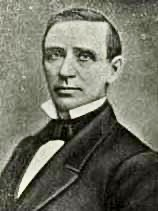

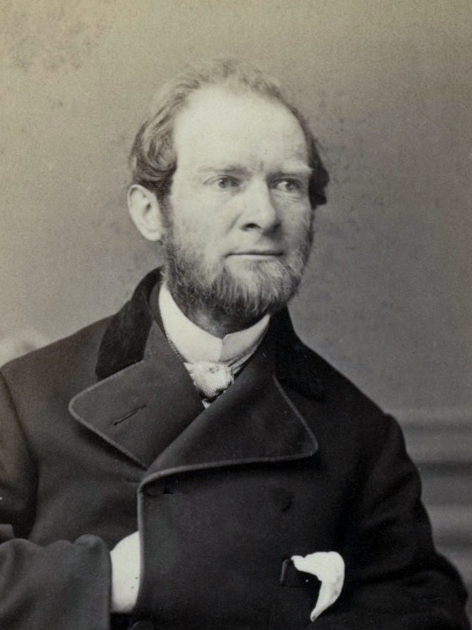
Nominee	Francis Cornwall Sherman	Thomas Barbour Bryan
Party	Democratic	National Union
Popular vote	10,252	10,095
Percentage	50.39%	49.62%
Mayor before election
Francis Cornwall Sherman
Democratic
Elected mayor
Francis Cornwall Sherman
Democratic

In the Chicago mayoral election of 1863, Democrat Francis Cornwall Sherman won reelection, defeating National Union nominee Thomas Barbour Bryan by an extremely narrow quarter percent margin.

== Background ==
In 1862, Sherman had appointed a committee which recommended that Chicago pass a new city charter which would annex Bridgeport and Holstein, lengthen the terms for mayor, treasurer, collector, city attorney, and clerk of police each from one to two years. Ultimately, such a charter and measures came to pass before the 1863 mayoral election. This made 1863 the first mayoral election held to a two-year term.

Since his 1862 mayoral victory, Sherman had, in October 1862, lost a congressional election to Isaac N. Arnold.

The election was held on April 21. It was the third of four Chicago mayoral elections which took place during the course of the American Civil War.

Local tensions between the two major parties were strong in the spring of 1863. Alderman Charles C. P. Holden had introduced several resolutions which Sherman vetoed for being too partisan. Republicans sought to see Democrats provide greater support for war measures, while Democrats were critical of President Lincoln's handling of the war. At the time the Common Council's swing vote was Alderman Shimp, a Democrat voted with the Republicans.

== Nominations ==
=== Democratic ===
The Democratic Party renominated Mayor Sherman.

=== National Union ===
The National Union party nominated Thomas Barbour Bryan. He had previously been an unsuccessful candidate in the 1861 mayoral election.

Names presented for balloting at the convention were Bryan, George W. Gage, and William Hoyt. After an informal ballot, Philip Wadsworth announced to the convention that Gage had authorized the withdrawal of his name, and offered his full support to the selection of Bryan as the party's nominee.

National Union convention balloting
Candidate	Informal ballot	Formal ballot
Bryan	74	86
Gage	9	9
Hoyt	9	7
Total	92	93

After the balloting, the convention adopted a motion to make Gage's nomination unanimous.

== Campaigning ==
Sherman's candidacy benefited immensely from the support of Irish and German voters from the newly annexed neighborhoods of the city. The Chicago Tribune characterized Sherman as being sound in his position on the war, but criticized his affiliation with the Chicago Times and copperheads.

Bryan was a reluctant candidate, as was also the case when he ran in 1861.

The Bridgeport ward of Chicago was nicknamed the "Egypt of Chicago". Democrats believed the ward would secure Sherman his margin of victory, a prediction which ultimately proved true.

== Results ==
With the exception of the nullified March 1844 mayoral election, Sherman's margin of victory was the narrowest in Chicago mayoral election history.

By winning this election, Sherman became the first individual to be elected to three terms as mayor of Chicago.

In the Common Council elections held simultaneously, nineteen Democrats and twelve National Unionists were elected, with an additional seat being vacant. Nearly the entire Democratic ticket was elected by majorities between 250 and 300 votes.

1863 Chicago mayoral election
Party	Candidate	Votes	%
Democratic	Francis Cornwall Sherman (incumbent)	10,252	50.39
National Union	Thomas Barbour Bryan	10,095	49.62
Total votes		20,347	100

=== Controversy ===
With a narrow vote, Republicans claimed that the Democrats had won through electoral fraud. They appointed a committee to investigate, and Bryan notified Sherman that he would contest the result.

Ultimately, Bryan did not contest. While he believed that he had received a majority of the legal votes, and was pressured by friends to contest the election he was not greatly enough concerned about the result of the election to pursue the process of contesting it.
