= John Blake Rice =

American politician

John B. Rice
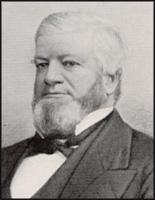

Member of the U.S. House of Representatives from Illinois's 1st district
- In office March 4, 1873 – December 17, 1874
- Preceded by: Charles B. Farwell
- Succeeded by: Bernard G. Caulfield

24th Mayor of Chicago
- In office May 3, 1865 – December 6, 1869
- Preceded by: Francis Cornwall Sherman
- Succeeded by: Roswell B. Mason

Personal details
- Born: May 28, 1809 Easton, Maryland, U.S.
- Died: December 17, 1874 (aged 65) Chicago, Illinois, U.S.
- Party: Republican
- Spouse: Mary Ann Warren

John Blake Rice (May 28, 1809 – December 17, 1874) was an American actor, theatrical producer and politician. He served as the mayor of Chicago, Illinois (1865–1869) as a member of the Republican Party.

== Early life and career ==
Rice was born in Easton, Maryland, and made his acting debut in Annapolis in 1829. His first professional role was as Uncle Barnwell in George Lillo's The London Merchant. He toured up and down the East Coast, as well as in the West Indies. While living in Philadelphia, Pennsylvania, he married into a local theatre family. By 1839, he moved his family to Buffalo, New York, where he managed a theatre during the summers. In winter, he managed a theatre in Albany.

Rice arrived in Chicago in 1847 to work as an actor and entertain the politicians at the River and Harbor Convention, Chicago's first national convention. He decided to stay and establish a permanent theater, called Rice's Theater. On July 30, 1850, in the middle of Vincenzo Bellini's opera La Sonnambula, a fire broke out in the theater. Rice addressed the crowds, saying "Sit down. Do you think I would permit a fire to occur in my theater?" The crowd sat, but a prompter stage-whispered to Rice that the theater was on fire and panic ensued. The theater was destroyed, and he lost about $4,000. When a benefit only raised $60, he left Chicago for Milwaukee, Wisconsin.

Rice returned to Chicago in 1851 and built a new theater, entirely of brick. He hired James McVicker to serve as manager, and was active in the theater until 1857.

== Mayoralty ==
In 1865, near the end of the Civil War, Rice ran for mayor of Chicago as a very conservative Republican. Aided by the end of the war and the subsequent assassination of Abraham Lincoln only days before the election, Rice won easily.

Rice was sworn in as mayor on May 3, 1865.

As mayor, Rice was anti-labor, and he vetoed a plan to enforce an eight-hour work day. This veto led to a spontaneous demonstration on May 1, 1867, by workers which led to the international May Day observance. The City Council eventually overrode his veto.

Rice and the City Council were connected with graft, prostitution and gambling.

Rice was reelected in 1867.

Rice was defeated in his bid for a third term by Roswell B. Mason in 1869. Rice's mayoralty ended on December 6, 1869, when he was succeeded Mason.

== Congressional career ==
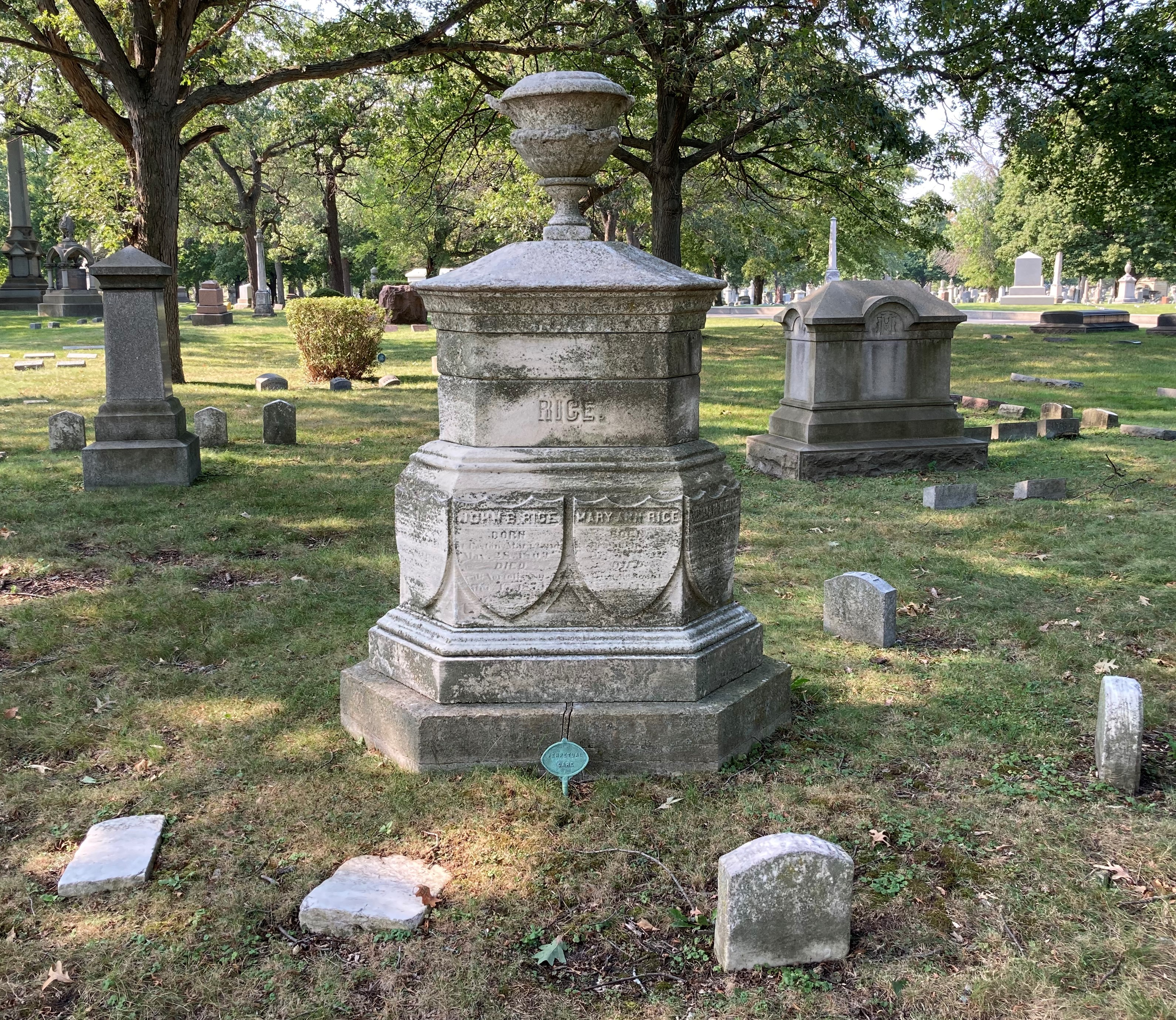
Rice's grave at Rosehill Cemetery

Rice was elected to represent Illinois's 1st congressional district in the United States House of Representatives in 1872. While serving in the House, he died from liver cancer on December 17, 1874, in Norfolk, Virginia. He died on December 17, 1874, in a home he constructed in Norfolk, Virginia. Rice had been in ill health for some time, even before his election to congress, but refused medical treatment. He was survived by his widow and five daughters. He had not sought re-election in 1874, and his death soon after the election raised issues about whether Illinois Governor John Beveridge was required to appoint a replacement to complete his term. In the end, Bernard G. Caulfield won a special election to complete the term, after having already been elected to succeed Rice. Rice was buried in Chicago's Rosehill Cemetery.

== See also ==
- List of members of the United States Congress who died in office (1790–1899)

U.S. House of Representatives
Preceded by Charles B. Farwell	Member of the U.S. House of Representatives from Illinois's 1st congressional district 1873–1874	Succeeded by Bernard G. Caulfield
Party political offices
Preceded by Thomas Barbour Bryan	Republican nominee for Mayor of Chicago; 1865, 1867	Succeeded by George W. Gage
