= 1871 Chicago mayoral election =

- November 7, 1871
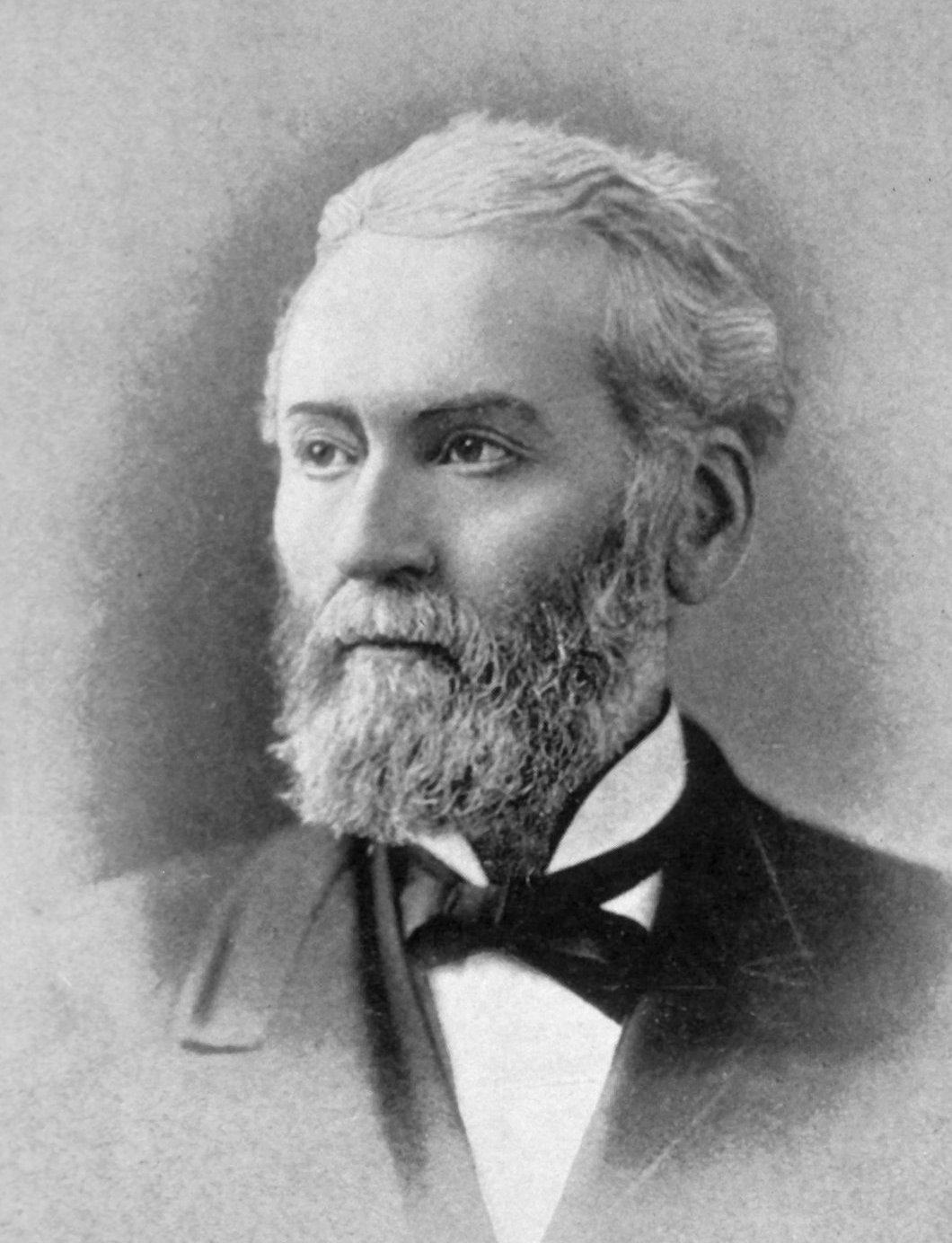

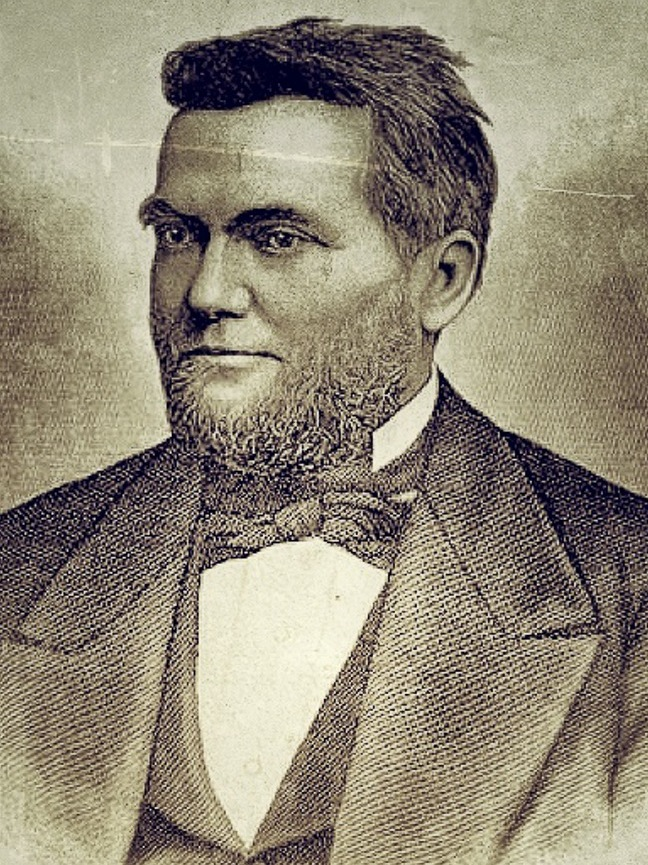
Nominee	Joseph Medill	Charles C. P. Holden
Party	Union-Fireproof Republican	People's Ticket Republican
Popular vote	16,125	5,988
Percentage	72.92%	27.08%
Mayor before election
Roswell B. Mason
Citizens Party
Elected mayor
Joseph Medill
Republican

In the Chicago mayoral election of 1871, Joseph Medill defeated Charles C. P. Holden by a landslide 46-point margin.

Holden was president of the Common Council, and constructed the Landmark Holden Block in 1872.

The election took place on November 7, a month after Chicago suffered the calamity of the Great Chicago Fire.

The administration of the election was challenging because the majority of Chicago's voting records had been incinerated by the Great Chicago Fire, meaning that there were few resources to prevent individuals from voting more than once.

== Nominations ==
The election was greatly shaped by the Great Chicago Fire.

Incumbent mayor Roswell B. Mason did not run for reelection.

Both nominees (in different manners) were formed by different portions of the local Republican Party and Democratic Party (with the "Union–Fireproof" ticket first being formed by the county central committees of each party, while the "People's Ticket" was formed afterwards at rump conventions of members of each of party who did not fall-in-line behind the central committees' joint ticket.

Medill ran on the "Union-Fireproof" ticket. The Union-Fireproof ticket had been formed by a group of Chicago businessmen and civic leaders led by Carter Harrison III It was a joint Democratic and Republican ticket, with different offices selected by the central committees of the county's Republican and Democratic committees. Despite their drafting of Medill to be their mayoral nominee, he initially refused the nomination. Medill was preoccupied with the task of running his Chicago Tribune newspaper business, particularly after its headquarters building had been lost in the fire. However, after several days of being pressured to accept the nomination, he agreed to run on the condition that the Illinois State Legislature would enact a new city charter for Chicago which gave more formal power to the mayor. In his speech accepting the nomination, he noted that he would likely resign as mayor if the legislature failed to pass such a charter. The ticket was a liberal reform one.

After the "Union–Fireproof" ticket was jointly by each major party's central committees, so-called "sorehead" members of both parties (who were non-supportive of the ticket that was formed) still convened the party's nominating conventions out of which they together jointly selected nominees for the so-called "People's Ticket" that was fielded to run in opposition to the Union–Fireproof ticket in city and county elections. Holden had been supported for the ticket's nomination by the local Democratic Party, which at the time was very weakly organized. The party's main base of support came from the city's immigrant community. Holden was the alderman from the city's Tenth Ward and had served as president of the City Council during Mason's mayoralty.

=== Campaigning ===
The campaigning period lasted only roughly two weeks.

In his campaign, Medill promised to enact strengthened building regulations and fire codes. Medill also promised to rebuild the city, implement blue laws, and address the city's crime problems.

== Results ==
Medill won a landslide victory. The "Union-Fireprooof" ticket also saw its nominees for City Treasurer and City Collector elected as well. It also performed strongly in the Common Council election.

Medill was the city's first foreign-born mayor. Only one subsequent mayor has been foreign born, Anton Cermak.

1871 Chicago mayoral election
Party	Candidate	Votes	%
Union-Fireproof	Joseph Medill	16,125	72.92
People's	Charles C. P. Holden	5,988	27.08
Total votes		22,113	100
