= Julian Sidney Rumsey =

American politician

Julian Rumsey
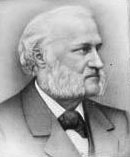

22nd Mayor of Chicago
- In office May 6, 1861 – May 5, 1862
- Preceded by: John Wentworth
- Succeeded by: Francis Cornwall Sherman

Cook County Treasurer
- In office 1871–1873
- Preceded by: H.S. Rexford
- Succeeded by: Henry B. Miller

Personal details
- Born: April 3, 1823 Batavia, New York
- Died: April 20, 1886 (aged 63) Chicago, Illinois, United States
- Party: Republican

Julian Sidney Rumsey (April 3, 1823 in Batavia, New York – April 20, 1886 in Chicago, Illinois) served as mayor of Chicago, Illinois (1861–1862) as a member of the Republican Party.

== Early life ==
Rumsey was born on April 3, 1823 in Batavia, New York.

== Early career ==
Rumsey arrived in Chicago on July 28, 1835, to work at Newberry & Dole, a shipping company owned by his uncles. For many years he worked as a clerk at the firm. When Newberry retired from the firm, Rumsey and his brother George became partners at the firm, which became Dole, Newberry & Co. Prior to the Rumseys becoming partners, the company had been focused solely and transporting freight. However, soon after they became partners the company began to focus on purchasing grain, operating out of a small warehouse on the North Side of the city. In September 1939, the firm sent the first-ever shipment of grain made in Chicago (2,900 bushels cosigned to Black Rock, New York). In 1852 Dole retired, and the firm, which for a time thereafter became known as Rumsey Brothers. The firm thereafter focused exclusively on the grain commission business. Later, Henry Towner joined as a partner and the firm was renamed Rumsey Brothers & Co, a name it would hold for decades thereafter. Rumsey remained in the grain business for the rest of his life.

Rumsey was a charter member of the Chicago Board of Trade, and remained a continuous member from its founding until his death. At the time of Rumsey's death, the only living charter member who had similarly maintained uninterrupted membership was Marcus C. Stearns. On April 5, 1858, he was chosen to serve as president of the Board of Trade. In early 1859, he was again chosen to be president of the Board of Trade after its new charter from the state legislature giving it new privileges. As president, he implemented bold changes, which included obtaining a new charter for the board as well as putting in place a modernized system of grain inspection and grading. The latter achievement earned him the title of the "Father of Grain Inspection." His efforts to implement strict inspection standards helped to give Chicago a strong reputation among American grain markets.

== Political involvement in the lead-up to the Civil War ==
Rumsey always took an interest in national and state politics, but had never been a major shaker in politics nor an office-seeker. However, he became more active amid the lead-up to the Civil War. He was an acquaintance of Abraham Lincoln (president-elect of the United States), and at this time regularly visited Lincoln in Springfield, Illinois to consult with him during Lincoln's presidential transition.

In this time period, he became an executive member of the Union's first War Finance Committee, and also served as a member of the central committee of the Illinois Republican Party.

== Mayoralty ==
In 1861, Rumsey was elected mayor of Chicago, defeating Democratic nominee Thomas Barbour Bryan. During the mayoral campaign, the Civil War officially broke out. Rumsey did much to arouse the enthusiasm of his fellow citizens in favor of the preservation of the Union. At the mass meeting in Metropolitan Hall a few days after the Battle of Fort Sumter, Rumsey delivered a stirring address. Neither Rumsey nor his opponent had been personally interested in becoming mayor, with each being reluctantly drafted into candidacies.

Rumsey was sworn in as mayor on May 6, 1861.

As mayor, Rumsey required all Chicagoans to take an oath of loyalty.

Rumsey's mayoralty ended on May 5, 1862, when he was succeeded in office by Democrat Francis Cornwall Sherman, who had won election in that year's election.

== Post-mayoralty ==
At the time of the Panic of 1873 he was president of the Corn Exchange National Bank.

After the Great Chicago Fire, Rumsey served as Cook County treasurer from 1871 through 1873.

In 1869, he founded the Illinois Society for the Prevention of Cruelty to Animals.

== Personal life ==
In 1848, Rumsey married the daughter of John B. Turner (Northwestern Railway president), with whom he had many children.

== Death ==
Rumsey died on April 20, 1886 of progressive paresis that occurred after a short period of illness. He is buried in Graceland Cemetery.

He was survived by his widow and nine surviving adult children (three sons and six daughters).

== Memorials ==
Rumsey Avenue, which runs NE/SW between the intersections of 87th St. & Pulaski and 85th St. & Hamlin, on Chicago's far Southwest Side, is named for him.

Party political offices
Preceded by Walter S. Gurnee	Republican nominee for Mayor of Chicago; 1861	Succeeded by Charles N. Holden
