= Bernard G. Caulfield =

American politician (1828–1887)

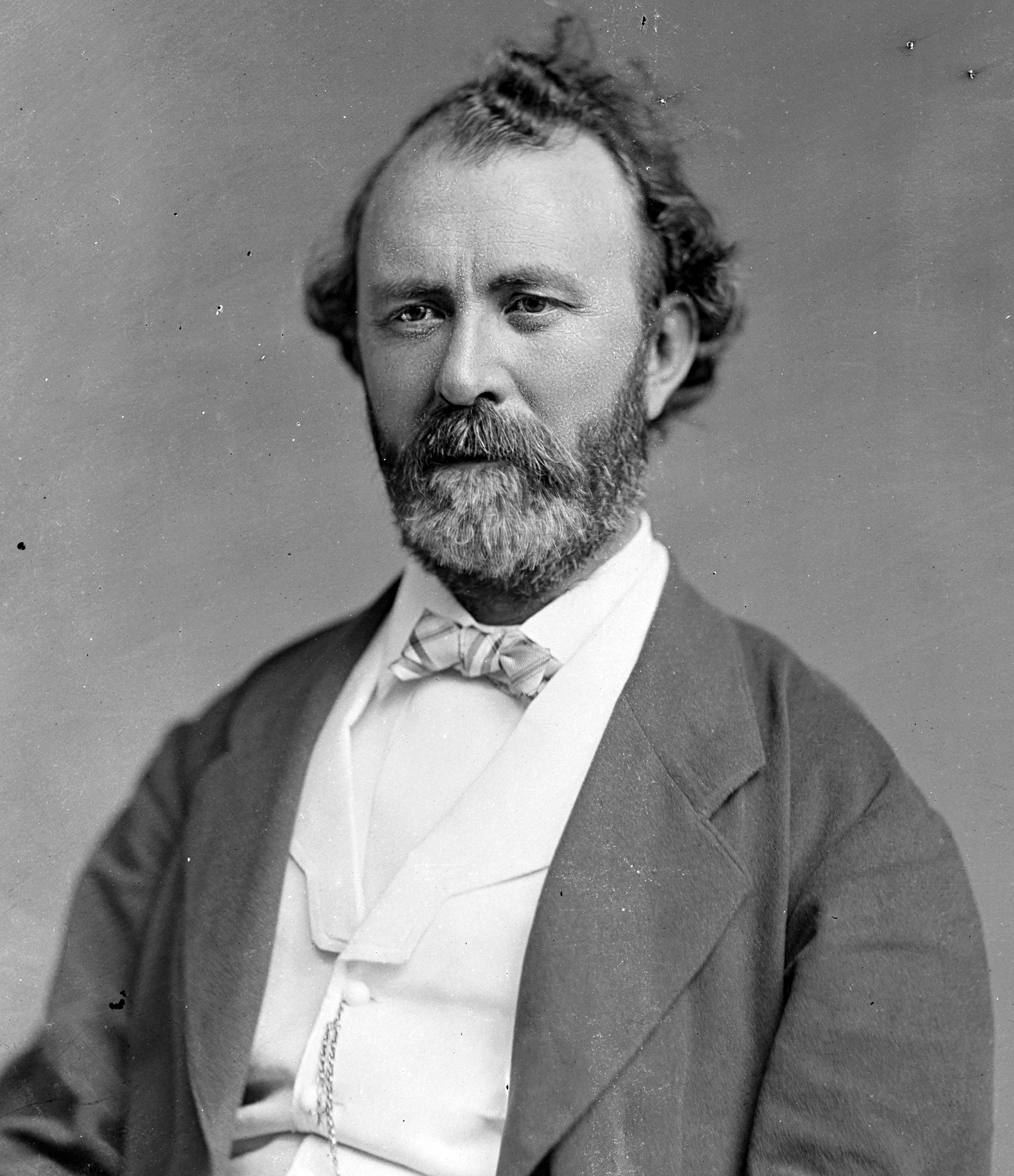

Member of the U.S. House of Representatives from Illinois's 1st district
- In office February 1, 1875 – March 3, 1877
- Preceded by: John Blake Rice
- Succeeded by: William Aldrich

Personal details
- Born: October 18, 1828 Alexandria, Virginia, U.S.
- Died: December 19, 1887 (aged 59) Deadwood, South Dakota, U.S.
- Party: Democratic

Bernard Gregory Caulfield (October 18, 1828 – December 19, 1887) was a U.S. representative from Illinois.

Born in Alexandria, Virginia, Caulfield received a classical education. He was graduated from Georgetown College, Washington, D.C. in 1848, and from the University of Pennsylvania Law School at Philadelphia in 1850. He was admitted to the bar in 1850 and commenced the practice of law in Lexington, Kentucky. He moved to Chicago, Illinois in 1853 and continued the practice of his profession.

Caulfield was elected in 1874 as a Democrat to the Forty-fourth Congress to succeed John B. Rice, who had not sought reelection; when Rice died a month after the election, Caulfield won an additional special election to complete Rice's term in the Forty-third Congress, and served from February 1, 1875 to March 3, 1877. He served as chairman of the Committee on Expenditures in the Department of Justice (Forty-fourth Congress). He was not a candidate for renomination in 1876.

He resumed the practice of law. He moved to Dakota Territory in 1878 and settled in Deadwood. He continued the practice of law and became a large landowner. He died in Deadwood on December 19, 1887. He was interred in Calvary Cemetery, St. Louis, Missouri.

U.S. House of Representatives
Preceded by John B. Rice	Member of the U.S. House of Representatives from Illinois's 1st congressional district 1875–1877	Succeeded by William Aldrich
