= 1867 Chicago mayoral election =

- April 16, 1867
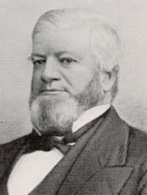

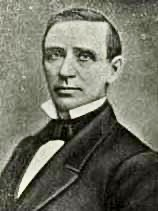
Nominee	John Blake Rice	Francis Cornwall Sherman
Party	Republican	Democratic
Popular vote	11,904	7,971
Percentage	59.89%	40.11%
Mayor before election
John Blake Rice
Republican
Elected mayor
John Blake Rice
Republican

In the Chicago mayoral election of 1867, incumbent Republican John Blake Rice won reelection, defeating Democrat Francis Cornwall Sherman by a nearly twenty-point margin.

The election was held on April 16. It was ultimately a rematch of the previous election. This was Chicago's first mayoral election held after the conclusion of the American Civil War.

This was the final election before a law that would move mayoral elections from April to November.

== Results ==
1867 Chicago mayoral election
Party	Candidate	Votes	%
Republican	John Blake Rice (incumbent)	11,904	59.89
Democratic	Francis Cornwall Sherman	7,971	40.11
Turnout		19,875	
