= William Aldrich =

U.S. Representative

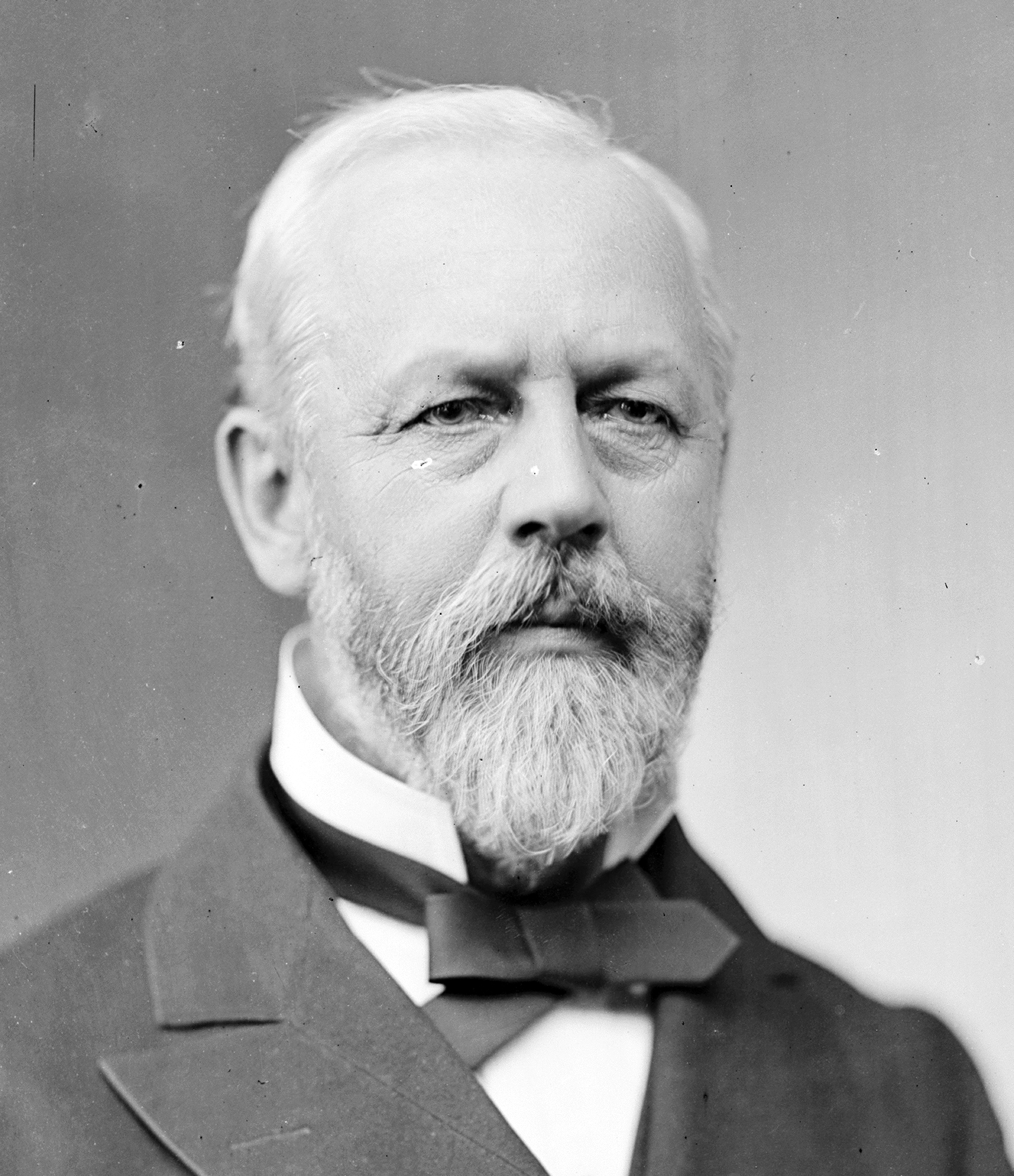

Member of the U.S. House of Representatives from Illinois's 1st district
- In office March 4, 1877 – March 3, 1883
- Preceded by: Bernard G. Caulfield
- Succeeded by: Ransom W. Dunham

Member of the Chicago City Council from the 3rd ward
- In office 1876–1877 Serving with John L. Thompson
- Preceded by: William Fitzgerald
- Succeeded by: Eugene Cary

Member of the Wisconsin State Assembly from the Manitowoc 1st district
- In office January 12, 1859 – January 11, 1860
- Preceded by: Henry C. Hamilton
- Succeeded by: Joseph Rankin

Chairman of the Manitowoc County Board
- In office 1857–1858

Personal details
- Born: January 19, 1820 Greenfield, New York, U.S.
- Died: December 3, 1885 (aged 65) Fond du Lac, Wisconsin, U.S.
- Resting place: Rosehill Cemetery; Chicago, Illinois
- Party: Republican
- Spouses: Anna Mary (Howard) Aldrich; (died 1911)
- Children: William Howard Aldrich^{(b. 1847; died 1915)}; James Franklin Aldrich^{(b. 1853; died 1933)}; Charles Benjamin Aldrich^{(b. 1855; died 1861)}; Frederick Clement Aldrich^{(b. 1862; died 1948)}
- Parent: Mercy (Farnum) Aldrich (mother)

William Aldrich (January 19, 1820 – December 3, 1885) was an American Republican politician who served as Congressman from the state of Illinois.

== Biography ==
He was born in Greenfield Center in the Town of Greenfield in New York. He attended local schools and taught school himself.

Aldrich moved to Michigan and then to Two Rivers, Wisconsin, where he worked as a shopkeeper and manufacturer. He served as superintendent of schools from 1855 to 1856 and chairman of the county board of supervisors from 1857 to 1858. In 1859 he was elected to the Wisconsin State Assembly. He moved to Chicago, Illinois in 1861 and opened another shop.

He served as congressman from 1877 to 1883 after having earlier served in the Chicago City Council in 1876.

Aldrich died in Fond du Lac, Wisconsin. He is buried in Rosehill Cemetery in Chicago. His son, James Franklin Aldrich also became a Congressman, holding the same congressional seat as his father.

U.S. House of Representatives
Preceded by Bernard G. Caulfield	Member of the U.S. House of Representatives from Illinois's 1st congressional district 1877–1883	Succeeded by Ransom W. Dunham
