= Holden Block =

Commercial building in Chicago, Illinois

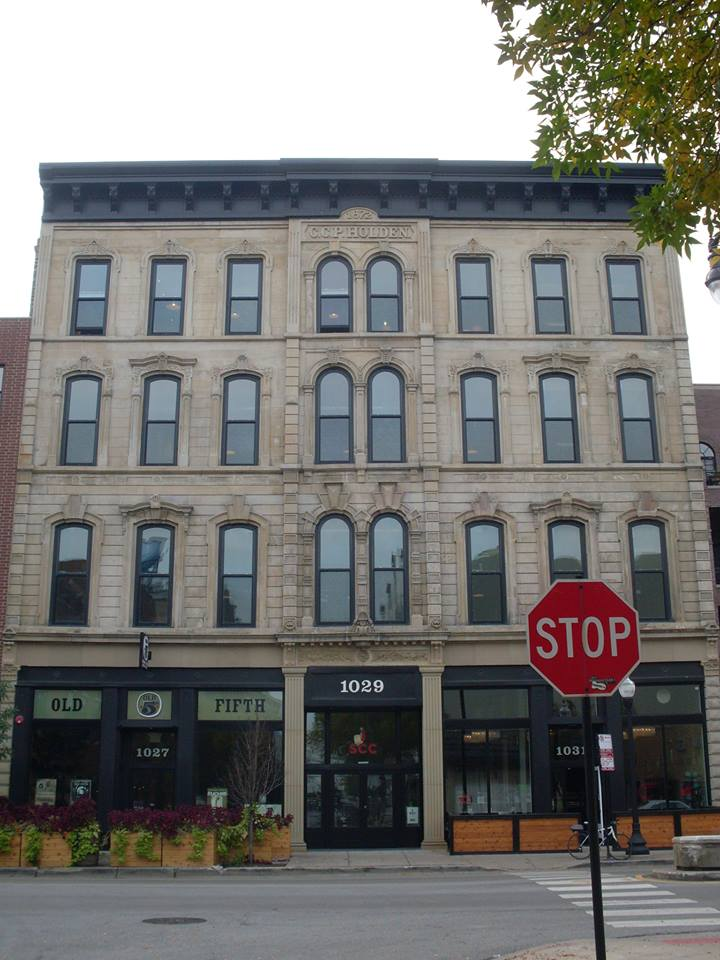
- The Holden Block in 2014
- Interactive map of the Holden Block area

General information
- Location: 1027 W. Madison Street; Chicago, Illinois, U.S.
- Coordinates: 41°52′53.1″N 87°39′11.9″W
- Completed: 1872
- Renovated: 1894, 2010–2012

Design and construction
- Architect: Stephen Vaughan Shipman

The Holden Block is a commercial building in the Near West Side of Chicago. Located at 1027 West Madison Street, it was constructed in 1872 in the aftermath of the Great Chicago Fire by Charles C. P. Holden. It is one of the few remaining examples of commercial blocks in Chicago and the best preserved in the Near West Side.

The commercial block was a building form very popular in Chicago in the 1870s until it was replaced by the skyscraper in the 1890s. During the 20th century, most blocks were demolished and replaced with new development. The Holden Block, despite being located in a declining neighborhood and falling vacant in the mid-20th century, survived these developments and was designated a Chicago landmark in 2011. It was purchased by the advertising agency Schafer Condon Carter (SCC) in 2010 and restored as its headquarters in 2012.

The building is located in an area that was commercial before it declined in the 20th century, being deemed "skid row" after World War II; gentrification began in the 1980s. The neighborhood has bus and rapid transit service.

== History ==
Reconstruction was rapid in the aftermath of the Great Chicago Fire of October 1871; within six weeks of the fire, 318 buildings were built in the burnt area. Built in haste at the expense of style, these initial buildings were sparsely ornamented. More stylized buildings came in spring 1872, designed predominantly with Italianate architecture. Although the Near West Side had been largely spared from the fire, it was extensively developed during this time. Multi-story masonry buildings, known as "commercial blocks", were very popular during this time as they provided flexibility in use. Their dominance was short-lived, however, as skyscrapers began to replace them about 20 years after their construction, and most blocks were demolished during the 20th century to make way for new development.

The Holden Block in particular was built in 1872 by Charles C. P. Holden, a prominent politician, to a design by Stephen Vaughan Shipman. A speculator, Holden sold the property to George C. Clark in 1873. Throughout the 1870s and 1880s, the building housed dry goods and furniture stores, housing the latter into the 1920s. It was significantly damaged by a gas explosion and fire in 1894 but rebuilt while preserving the original facade. In 1928, 1027 West Madison Street housed the Lincoln Auction and Storage Company, but the other addresses were vacant.

The building served as a tavern in 1953, and was vacant by the time of a fire in 1954. Although many surrounding buildings were demolished starting in the 1970s to make way for redevelopment, the Holden Block survived and was designated a Chicago landmark in 2011. In its designation, it was deemed the best surviving commercial block in the Near West Side.

The advertising agency Schafer Condon Carter (SCC) purchased the building from a foreclosure in 2010 to make it its headquarters. SCC restored the property, obtaining a tax incentive from the Chicago City Council for the restoration at the time of the landmark declaration. SCC's restoration, completed in 2012, was positively received and regarded as "turning back the clock" on the structure that had been "in sorry shape". In 2017, the building was tied for the tenth-oldest landmarked building in Chicago.

== Description ==
Located in Chicago's Near West Side, the block's nominal address is 1027 West Madison Street, although its businesses' addresses go up to 1031. The building occupies the entirety of its 72-by-100-foot (22 m × 30 m) lot. Its facade is clad in Buena Vista stone, a stone quarried in Ohio that was popular in construction at the time. The facade contains 24 windows surrounded by eight various designs; the windows were originally double-hung but had become single-hung by 2011. The 1894 fire destroyed its western section and south and west walls; those were rebuilt under the plan of architect John M. Van Osdel while retaining the original facade. It originally had a cornice, which was lost by 2011 but restored by SCC. Most windows were bricked over by 2011 but also restored by SCC.

=== Surrounding area ===
The block's neighborhood, previously commercial, started to decline in the early 20th century, and became known as "skid row" after World War II; the building itself also fell on hard times, being vacant in 1954. The area gentrified starting in the 1980s and as of 2010 was regarded as trendy.

As of 2022, the #20 Madison bus operates in the area and has owl service. For rapid transit, Morgan station on the Green and Pink Lines serves the building's north, while Racine and UIC–Halsted stations on the Blue Line serve its south, the Blue Line with owl service.

== See also ==
- Delaware Building, another surviving Italianate commercial block in Chicago

== Works cited ==
- Holden Block (PDF) (Report). City of Chicago Commission on Chicago Landmarks. March 3, 2011.
- Polk's Chicago (Illinois) Numerical Street and Avenue Directory (PDF). Chicago: R. L. Polk and Company. 1928. Archived from the original (PDF) on August 27, 2016 – via Chicago Historical Society.
