= Francis Cornwall Sherman =

American politician (1805–1870)

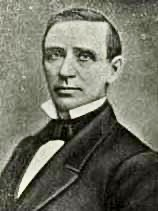

5th & 23rd Mayor of Chicago
- In office May 5, 1862 – May 3, 1865
- Preceded by: Julian Sidney Rumsey
- Succeeded by: John Blake Rice
- In office March 4, 1841 – March 7, 1842
- Preceded by: Alexander Loyd
- Succeeded by: Benjamin Wright Raymond

Chairman of the Cook County Board of Commissioners
- In office 1851–1853

Illinois State Representative
- In office 1844–1850

City Treasurer of Chicago
- In office 1842–1843
- Preceded by: N.H. Bolles
- Succeeded by: Walter S. Gurnee

Chicago Alderman from the 2nd ward
- In office 1837–1838 Serving with Peter Bolles
- Preceded by: office established
- Succeeded by: James Curtiss/ John S.C. Hogan

Chicago Village Trustee
- In office 1835–1836

Personal details
- Born: September 18, 1805 Newtown, Connecticut
- Died: November 7, 1870 (aged 65) Chicago, Illinois
- Resting place: Graceland Cemetery
- Party: Democratic
- Children: 7 (including Francis)

Francis Cornwall Sherman (September 18, 1805 – November 7, 1870) served as Mayor of Chicago, Illinois, for three terms (1841–1842, 1862–1865) as a member of the Democratic Party.

== Early life ==
Sherman was born September 18, 1805, in Newtown, Connecticut. He married Electa Towbridge of Danbury, Connecticut.

== Early career in Chicago ==
Sherman arrived in Chicago on April 7, 1834. He built a small boardinghouse, and used those profits to buy a stagecoach, establishing a stage line from Chicago to Galena, Joliet, Peoria, and other towns in Illinois. In 1835, he began to work in brick manufacturing and construction.

In July 1835, he was elected a village trustee, holding his seat for a year. In 1837, he opened the City Hotel, a hotel that would be later renamed the Sherman House. Also in 1837, after Chicago incorporated as a city, Sherman was elected an alderman from the 2nd ward on the newly created Chicago Common Council, and held this seat for one year.

== First mayoralty (1841–42) ==
Sherman was elected mayor of Chicago in 1841, running as the Democratic nominee and defeating Whig nominee Isaac R. Gavin.

While the Wig Party had been national dominant in the recent 1840 national election, the party was discordant by March 1841 and ran a poor campaign in Chicago which aided the election of Democrats to eight of the Chicago Common Council's twelve seats. Sherman was sworn in on March 4, 1841. At the time, Chicago had a population of only 5,000. Because of his party's majority in the city council, the small size of the city, and the lack of contentious issues arising: Sherman's first mayoralty was uncontroversial. His first mayoralty ended on March 7, 1842, when he was succeeded by Whig Benjamin Wright Raymond.

== City Treasurer, State Senate and Cook County Board of Commissioners ==
After leaving office as mayor, Sherman held various other elected offices. He was City Treasurer of Chicago from 1842 through 1843. He then served in the Illinois House of Representatives from 1844 through 1850. During this time, was a delegate to the 1847 Illinois constitutional convention.

In 1850, Sherman retired from his brickmaking venture in order to focus himself on public service and developing the properties that he owned. He expanded his hotel, adding two floors atop its existing three, and renaming it the "Sherman House".

Sherman served Chairman of the Cook County Board of Commissioners from 1851 through 1853. Sherman ran in the contentious 1856 Chicago mayoral election as an anti-Nebraska Democrat. He lost to pro-Nebraska Democrat Thomas Dyer.

Sherman rebuilt and re-opened the Sherman House Hotel in 1861, making it one of the grand hotels of Chicago.

== Second mayoralty ==
=== Second term (1862–1863) ===
Sherman was again elected mayor in the 1862 Chicago mayoral election, defeating Republican nominee Charles N. Holden. Sherman was sworn in as mayor on May 5, 1862.

Before the 1862 city elections, Republicans controlled city government in Chicago, holding both the mayoralty and a majority of seats on the Common Council. The Republican Party had enjoyed great recent success in Chicago elections. However, this changed in the 1862 elections. In March 1862, the Democratic-majority Illinois General Assembly passed a redistricting of council wards that gerrymandered the council's election map to the Democratic Party's advantage. Democrats also won the mayoralty. At the city Republican convention held before 1862 mayoral election, Charles N. Holden defeated John Wentworth (a popular former mayor and congressman) to secure the Republican mayoral nomination. Many angered supporters of Wentworth spited the Republican Party by instead voting for Sherman, aiding in his election. The low-turnout 1862 city elections saw the city government shift from Republican to Democratic control. With Democrats holding half of the council's seats and Sherman able to cast tie-breaking votes, Democrats became the majority party on the council.

In November 1862, Sherman unsuccessfully ran for the United States House of Representatives, losing the Illinois 1st congressional district race to Republican Isaac N. Arnold.

Sherman and alderman John Comiskey had control over leading the Democratic bloc of the City Council, being opposed by the Republican bloc led by Charles C. P. Holden. Despite there being a slight Democratic majority (a 10 Democrat-10 Republican split, with Sherman able to cast tie-breaking votes), the city council was deadlocked in 1862 and early 1863. The deadlock became more severe when Holden led Republicans in refusing to attend meetings, thereby denying quorum. This was done in hopes of preventing Democrats from taking votes that Republicans feared might undercut the Union Army's effort in the American Civil War. As a result, no meetings were able to be held between December 22, 1862, and March 23, 1863. The death of a Republican alderman and the absence of Republican alderman Edward Salomon (who was away fighting in the war) increased the Democratic majority on paper to a 10–8 majority. However, Democratic alderman Peter Shimp declared himself a "War Democrat", effectively caucusing with the Republicans (as opposed to the "copperhead" Democratic majority). Presuming Salomon absence, Shimp's newly declared allegiance gave the council an effective 9–9 split with Sherman remaining the tie-breaker. On March 23, 1863, the council held its first meeting with a quorum in months was assembled in order to select election judges for the city's 1863 elections. Salomon attended, which surprised many as he had not announced beforehand that he attended to attend. Combined with the vote of Shimp, this gave the Republican bloc an effective majority at the meeting. The council passed a number of measures, including "patriotic resolutions" introduced by Holden that indicated the city's support of the national government's leadership in the war. Sherman vetoed a number of the "patriotic resolutions".

Sherman appointed a committee that recommended a new city charter which extended the terms of the mayor, treasurer, collector, city attorney, clerk of police court from one to two years, and also added the communities of Bridgeport and Hostein to the city's boundaries.

=== Third term (1863–1865) ===
Sherman was re-elected mayor in 1863, very narrowly defeating the Republican nominee Thomas Barbour Bryan. This election was the city's first election to a newly extended term of two years. He was elected, in part, thanks to the new Irish-American and German-American population from Bridgeport and Holstein.

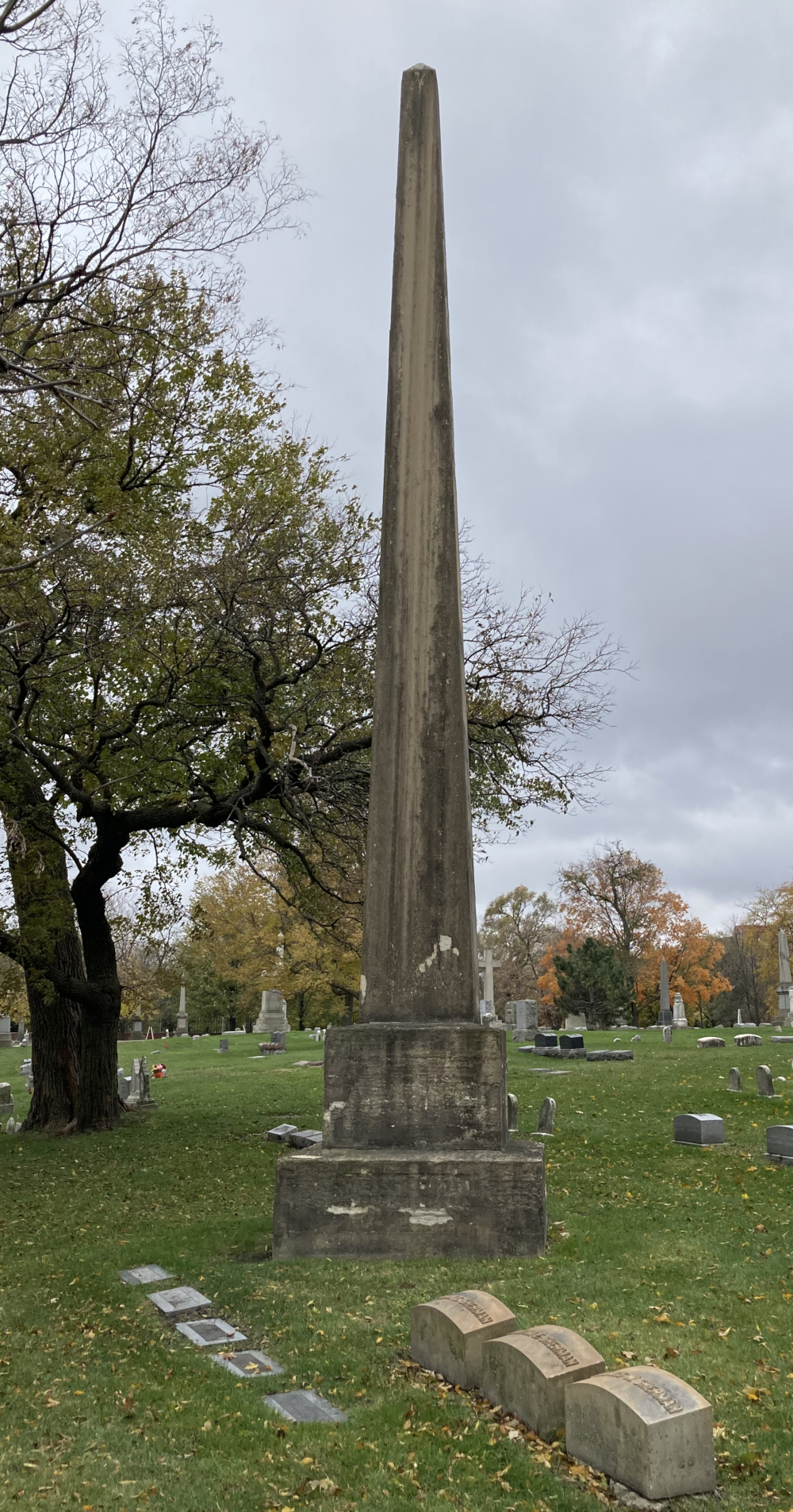
Cornwall's grave at Graceland Cemetery

Sherman lost re-election in 1865, in a race that was won by Republican John Blake Rice after the race heavily turned in the Republican Party's favor with sentiments shifting following the assassination of Republican president Abraham Lincoln days earlier. After the assassination, Sherman had all but formally withdrawn his candidacy. Sherman's second mayoralty ended on May 3, 1865, when he was succeeded in office by Rice. Sherman would later try again to win a fourth term as mayor in the 1867 Chicago mayoral election, running once again as the Democratic nominee, once again losing to Rice.

== Death ==
Sherman died at his home in Chicago on November 7, 1870. He was buried at Graceland Cemetery.

== Personal life ==
Sherman and his wife Electa had seven children together.

Sherman's son, Francis Trowbridge Sherman, was a brigadier general in the Union Army during the Civil War.

Party political offices
Preceded by Thomas Barbour Bryan	Democratic nominee for Mayor of Chicago; 1862, 1863, 1865, 1867	Succeeded by n/a
