= Charles N. Holden =

Chicago politician

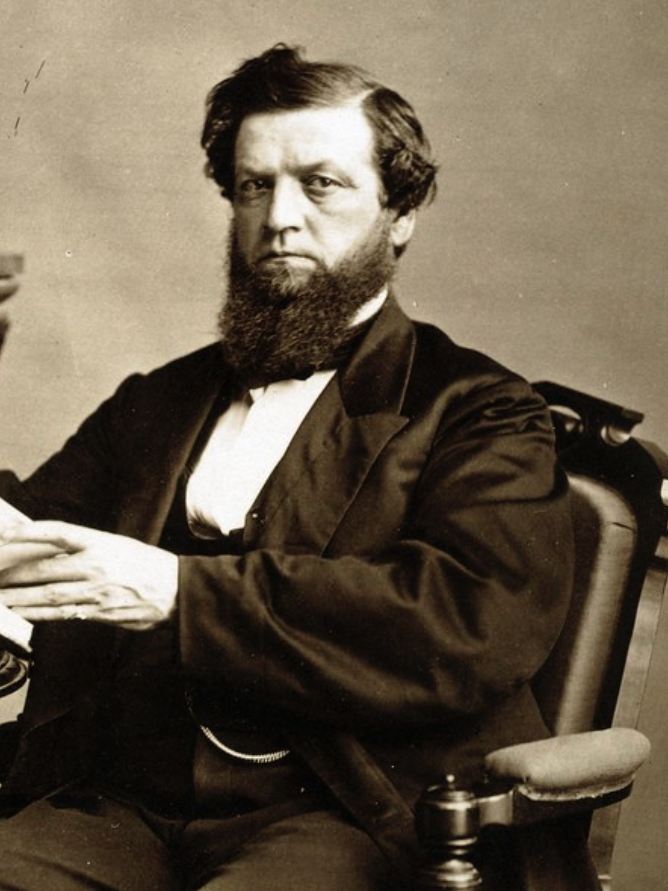
- Holden, circa 1868

Chicago Commissioner of Taxes
- In office 1864–1868

President of the Chicago Board of Education
- In office 1864–1866
- Preceded by: Walter Loomis Newberry
- Succeeded by: George C. Clarke

City Treasurer of Chicago
- In office 1857–1858
- Preceded by: O.J. Rose
- Succeeded by: Alonzo Harvey City

Chicago Alderman from the 5th ward
- In office 1855–1857 Serving with Jasper D. Ward (1855–56); Russell Green (1856–57)
- Preceded by: William H. Scoville
- Succeeded by: Artimas Carter

Personal details
- Born: Charles Newton Holden; May 13, 1816 Fort Covington, New York
- Died: September 29, 1887 (aged 71) Chicago, Illinois
- Resting place: Rosehill Cemetery
- Party: Republican
- Relatives: Charles C. P. Holden (cousin)

Charles Newton Holden (May 13, 1816 – September 29, 1887) was an American politician who served as city treasurer of Chicago, a Chicago alderman, president of the Chicago Board of Education, and Chicago commissioner of taxes. He was the unsuccessful Republican Party nominee for mayor of Chicago in 1862.

== Early life ==
Holden was born May 13, 1816, in Fort Covington, New York.

== Career ==
Holden was a school teacher at the age of 20.

After working as a store clerk for a year, Holden moved to Chicago. He soon moved to Will County, Illinois, where he briefly lived with relatives and found work at a claim. Quickly moving back to Chicago, he found employment at a clerk in John H. Kinzie's lumber yard.

Holden was elected as a Chicago alderman from the 5th ward in 1855, serving until 1857, when he was elected Chicago city treasurer, a position he held through the following year.

Holden was a supporter of the 1860 presidential candidacy of Abraham Lincoln. He served on the committee that arranged the construction of the Wigwam, which was built to host the 1860 Republican National Convention.

In 1862, Holden was the Republican Party nominee for mayor of Chicago. He lost the election to Democratic nominee Francis Cornwall Sherman.

In 1864, Holden was elected as Chicago's commissioner of taxes, holding that position for four years.

He was a member of the Chicago Board of Education. From 1864 through 1866, Holden served as president of the Chicago Board of Education. The city named one of its schools after him.

Holden was one of the organizers of Chicago's Second Baptist Church, and held a number of leadership roles within that church. He was involved in the founding of the Morgan Park Theological Seminary.

Holden was a trustee of the state insane asylum.

Holden, in his later years, worked at the firm of A. H. Holden & Co. He would also manufacture paint. For over twenty years, Holden served as treasurer of Chicago's Firemen's Benevolent Society.

== Personal life ==
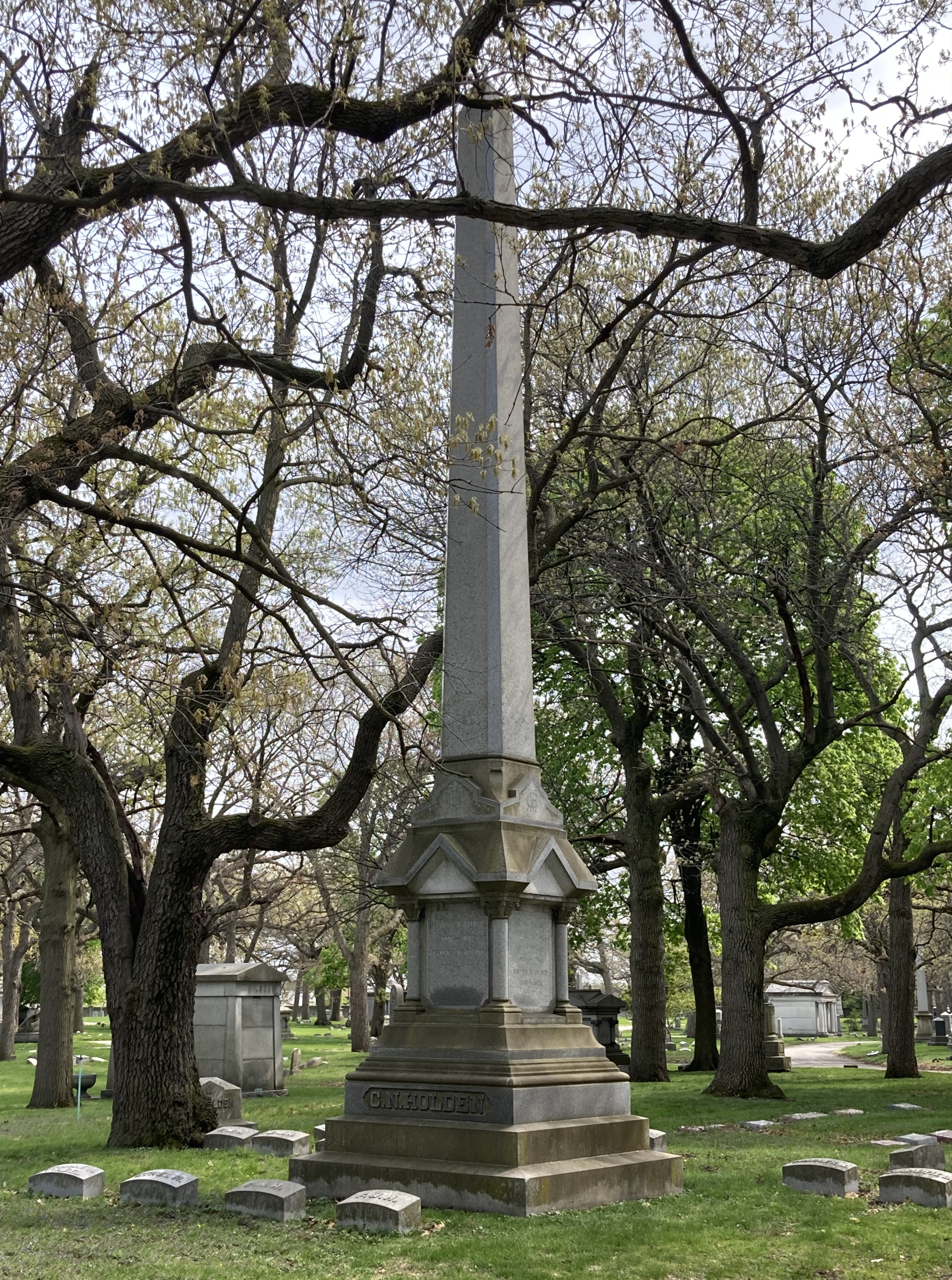
Holden's grave at Rosehill Cemetery

In 1841, Holden married Frances Woodbury.

Holden's extended family was well-involved in Chicago politics. This included Charles C. P. Holden, his cousin.

== Death ==
Holden died September 29, 1887, at his Chicago residence of a stroke. He had suffered a previous stroke roughly a year earlier, from which he had only partially recovered. His funeral was held October 3, 1887, at Chicago's Second Baptist Church, and he was buried at Rosehill Cemetery.

Party political offices
Preceded by Julian Sidney Rumsey	Republican nominee for Mayor of Chicago; 1862	Succeeded by Thomas Barbour Bryan
