= 1865 Chicago mayoral election =

- April 18, 1865
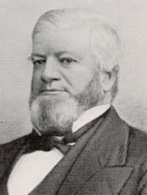

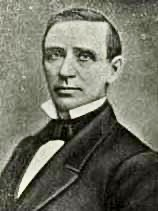
Nominee	John Blake Rice	Francis Cornwall Sherman
Party	Republican	Democratic
Popular vote	11,078	5,600
Percentage	66.42%	33.58%
Mayor before election
Francis Cornwall Sherman
Democratic
Elected mayor
John Blake Rice
Republican

In the Chicago mayoral election of 1865, Republican John Blake Rice defeated Democratic incumbent Francis Cornwall Sherman by a landslide 33% margin of victory.

The election was held on April 18, only four days after the assassination of Abraham Lincoln.

Originally, Democrat Leonard Rothgerber had been one of the candidates running. However, in the aftermath of the assassination of the Republican president, the shaken public had come to coalesce in support of Republican mayoral candidate Rice. Sensing this, Democratic candidate Leonard Rothgerber withdrew from the race and declared that there was a need for the nation to stand united. As a gesture of gratitude, Rice reimbursed Rothgerber's campaign expenses.

While he remained on the ballot, Sherman also all-but-withdrew from the race as well in the aftermath of Lincoln's assassination.

Rice was a "Reform" Republican.

This was the last of four mayoral elections that Chicago held during the course of the American Civil War.

== Results ==
1865 Chicago mayoral election
Party	Candidate	Votes	%
Republican	John Blake Rice	11,078	66.42
Democratic	Francis Cornwall Sherman (incumbent)	5,600	33.58
Turnout		16,678	
