= Charles C. P. Holden =

American politician (1827–1905)

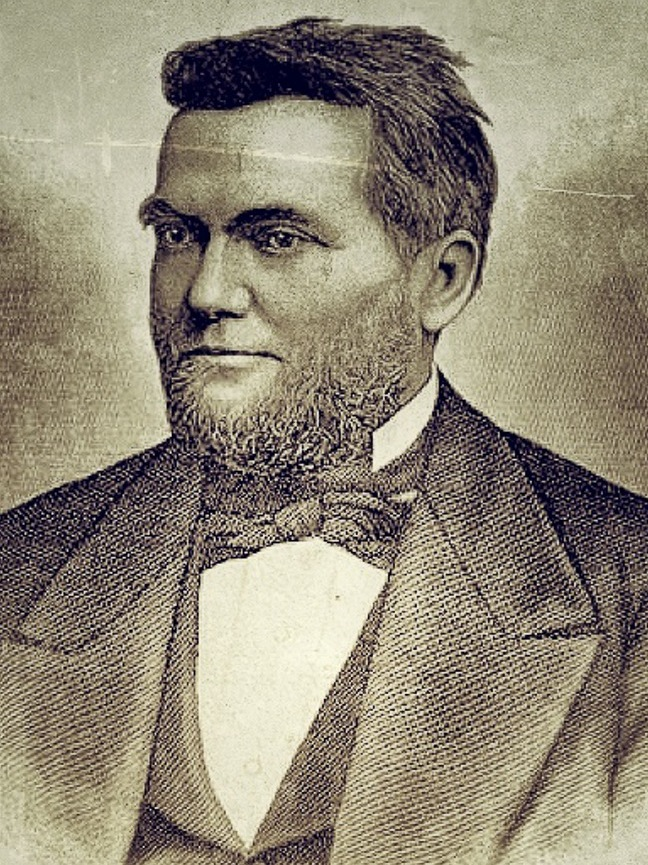

Chairman of the Cook County Board of Commissioners
- In office 1876–1877
- Preceded by: A. B. Johnson
- Succeeded by: Henry C. Senne

Member of the Cook County Board of Commissioners
- In office 1874–187?

Commissioner of the Chicago West Parks Board
- In office March 1869 – 1878
- Appointed by: John M. Palmer

Chicago Alderman
- In office 1863 – December 1872 Serving with George Hilmrod (1863–1865); Edmund Bixby (1865–1867); Alvin Salisbury (1868–1869); Thomas Wilco (1869–1871); Lester L. Bond (1871–1872)
- Preceded by: Redmond Sheridan
- Succeeded by: David W. Clark Jr.
- Constituency: 10th ward
- In office 1862–1863 Serving with Robert H. Foss (1860–1862); William A. Groves (1862—1863)
- Preceded by: L.B. Taft
- Succeeded by: Mark Sheridan/ Konstantine Kann
- Constituency: 5th ward

Personal details
- Born: August 9, 1827 Groton, New Hampshire
- Died: February 9, 1905 (aged 77) Matteson, Illinois
- Party: Republican
- Other political affiliations: Democratic
- Relatives: Charles N. Holden (cousin)

Military service
- Branch/service: United States Army
- Years of service: 1847–1848
- Battles/wars: Mexican–American War

Charles Courtney Pickney Holden (August 9, 1827 – February 9, 1905) was an American politician who served as chairman of the Cook County Board of Commissioners and president of the Chicago Common Council. He ran unsuccessfully for mayor of Chicago in the 1871 election.

== Early life ==
Holden was born on August 9, 1827, in Groton, New Hampshire. He was born to Phineas H. Holden and Betsy Holden (née Parker). He would be one of nine children.

One of his earliest American ancestors was Richard Holden, who came to America from Ipswich, England, in 1634 with his brother Justinian on the sailing-vessel Francis, settling in what would later become Watertown, Massachusetts. Holden's maternal grandfather was Levi Parker, who served as a lieutenant in the Continental Army during the American Revolution, serving from the war's start in the Battle of Bunker Hill, until its conclusion in the Siege of Yorktown. Levi Parker was with George Washington at the time of John André's capture, and served as a guard at André's execution.

With his family, Holden moved to Chicago, Illinois, on June 30, 1836, when it was still a town of only 4,000 residents. His family soon moved to Will County, Illinois. Holden returned to Chicago at the age of 15. In Chicago, Holden first worked at a grocery store owned by Charles Sweet on Water Street.

Beginning in the spring of 1847, Holden served in the Fifth Regiment of Illinois Volunteers in the Mexican–American War until being mustered out of service in Alton, Illinois, on October 16, 1848.

== Brief post-war return to Chicago ==
After the war, he returned to Chicago and worked at the A. H. & C. Burley bookstore on Lake Street from October 16, 1848, until March 1850.

== California Gold Rush ==
On March 19, 1850, he joined a party traveling overland from Fort Kearny, Missouri, to California. This was amid the California Gold Rush. Holden lived in California for four years before returning to Chicago in 1854. His group reached Hangtown, California, on July 12, 1850, where they began mining the middle fork of the American River. After spending two seasons mining the river (the second season being spent at Coloma Bar), in the autumn of 1851 Holden started farming and raising livestock in the Napa Valley. He continued until December 1, 1853, at which point he began his travels back east.

== Return to Chicago ==
On December 1, 1853, Holden began his journey back East on the SS Winfield Scott, which was headed towards Panama. However, on the first night of his voyage, the ship crashed into Anacapa Island and sank. After this ordeal, he and other surviving passengers subsequently traveled across the Panama isthmus, and were ultimately taken to New York by the Pacific Mail steamer Illinois, landing there on January 3, 1854. Holden returned to Chicago on March 18, 1854.

== Private-sector career in Chicago ==
In 1855, Holden began working as an examiner of lands for the Illinois Central Railroad, a job that he would keep for 18 years. His role for the company was to sell to land speculators and settlers the 2,595,000 acres (10,500 km^{2}) of land that the railroad had been previously granted by the federal government as part of the grant of the right-of-way for its railroad tracks from Chicago to Cairo, Illinois. He would leave this job in February 1873. He had, during his time working for the railroad, helped to sell two million acres of their land.

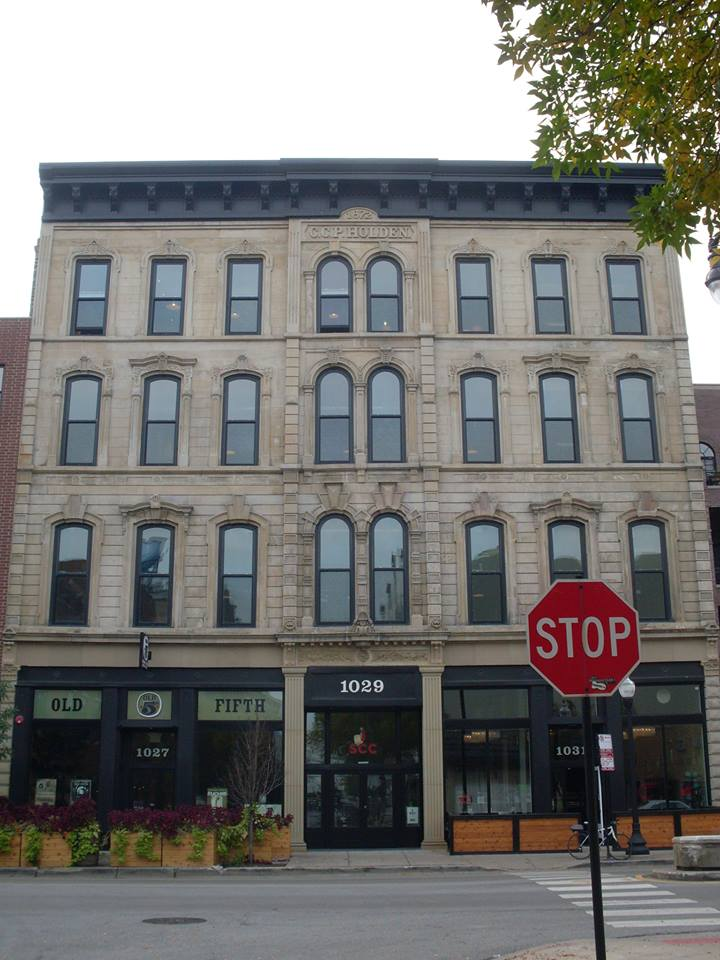
The Holden Block, built by Holden in 1872

Holden made a number of successful real estate investments, erecting several commercial blocks. In 1872, Holden built the Holden Block, a commercial block which survives to this day.

After leaving the Illinois Central Railroad's employ, he took a notable role in building the Chicago and Illinois River Railroad.

== Early political career ==
Holden became politically active in 1858, when he served as a delegate from Chicago to the Republican State Convention in Springfield, Illinois.

== Chicago Common Council (1861–72) ==
From 1861 until 1872, Holden served as a Chicago alderman on the Chicago Common Council (as the city council was then-named). From 1861 to 1863, he served as an alderman from the 5rd ward. From 1863 until 1872, he served as an alderman from the 10th ward. During his tenure as an alderman, the city saw many milestones: including the establishment of a new water system, the start of construction on a lake tunnel for its water supply, and the Great Chicago Fire. As an alderman Holden was an advocate for a number of infrastructure projects. He was a proponent of improving the city's roads. He also was an advocate for the provision of clean water to all residents within the city, and was a key proponent who helped to get a second intake tunnel built under Lake Michigan to collect water.

=== Civil War years (1861–65) ===
After the 1861 city elections, Republicans controlled city government in Chicago, holding both the mayoralty as well as a majority on the Common Council. The party had in the preceding years enjoyed great success in Chicago elections. However, this changed in 1862. In March 1862, the Democrat-majority Illinois General Assembly passed a redistricting of council wards that gerrymandered the council's election map to the Democratic Party's advantage. This resulted in the Democrats gaining seats in the 1862 council elections, with Democrats and Republicans each winning ten of the council's ten seats. Democrats also won the mayoralty. At the city Republican convention held before 1862 mayoral election, Charles N. Holden (Holden's own cousin) had defeated John Wentworth (a popular former mayor and congressman) to secure the Republican mayoral nomination. Many angered supporters of Wentworth spited the Republican Party by instead voting for the Democratic Party's nominee Francis Cornwall Sherman, who won the election. The low-turnout 1862 city elections saw the city government shift from Democratic to Republican control. With Democrats holding half of the council's seats and Mayor Sherman able to cast tie-breaking votes, Democrats became the majority party on the council.

When a military draft was ordered in case the quota of troops Chicago was required to furnish through volunteers was not met, Holden decided that his ward (the 10th) should not have a draft. He organized a "Ward Draft Association", and was selected as its president. The organization then worked to raise $51,912 to pay volunteers to the war. On the occasion that assassinated president Abraham Lincoln's remains visited Chicago as part of his funeral, Holden was the marshal of the City Council for their reception of his remains in the city. He also introduced resolutions that the Common Council adopted relating to Lincoln's funeral. He also served as chairman of a committee named to secure the attendance of General Ulysses S. Grant at Dearborn Park in July 1865.

Serving as the council's Republican floor leader, Holden led the council's Republican bloc in opposition. The Democratic faction of the council was led by mayor Francis Cornwall Sherman and alderman John Comiskey. From 1862 to 1863, the 10–10 split of aldermen led the council becoming severely deadlocked. The deadlock became more severe when Holden led Republicans in refusing to attend meetings, thereby denying quorum. This was done in hopes of preventing Democrats from taking votes that Republicans feared might undercut the Union Army's effort in the American Civil War. As a result, no meetings were able to be held between December 22, 1862, and March 23, 1863. The death of a Republican alderman and the absence of Republican alderman Edward S. Salomon (who was away fighting in the war) further decreased the Republican minority. However, Democratic alderman Peter Shimp declared himself a "War Democrat", effectively caucusing with the Republicans (as opposed to the "copperhead" Democratic majority). Presuming Salomon absence, this gave the council an effective 9–9 split with Mayor Sherman being a tie-breaker. On March 23, 1863, the council held its first meeting with a quorum in months was assembled in order to select election judges for the city's 1863 elections. Salomon attended, which surprised many as he had not announced beforehand that he attended to attend. This combined with the vote of Shimp gave the Republican bloc an effective majority at the meeting. The council passed a number of measures, including "patriotic resolutions" introduced by Holden that indicated the city's support of the national government's leadership in the war. The resolutions were passed 10–3 (with one Democrat abstaining, and five leaving the meeting before the final vote was cast). The resolutions included a clause that they would be subject to a public vote to be held at a mass meeting at Bryan Hall.

On June 25, 1863, Holden introduced an ordinance to create a further property tax in order to raise funds for equipment of military regiments and in order to fund military volunteer bounties. The ordinance was adopted unanimously.

Holden served as council president during the mayoralty of Roswell B. Mason.

=== Aftermath of the Great Chicago Fire and 1871 mayoral candidacy ===
Holden was council president when the Great Chicago Fire occurred. He helped lead the city's reconstruction from the fire, and also was involved in an investigation to determine at what hours the fire had reached different parts of the city. In the 1871 Chicago mayoral election, Holden was the nominee of both the Republican and Democratic parties for mayor. He lost in a landslide to Joseph Medill, however. The election was held only a month after the Great Chicago Fire.

In 1872, Holden retired from the council.

== Later politics ==
After retiring from the Common Council, Holden would continue to serve in government for years to come on the Cook County Board of Commissioners and the West Park Board of Commissioners.

In 1872, he was a nominee to serve as a presidential elector from Illinois if the Liberal Republican ticket headed by Horace Greeley had carried the state.

=== West Park Board of Commissioners (1869–78) ===
From 1869 until 1878 he served on the West Park Board of Commissioners, helping to build up the West Side of Chicago's parks and boulevards system.

He had been appointed in March 1869 by Illinois governor John M. Palmer in March 1869, and re-appointed by him in 1871. He resigned from the board in 1878.

=== Cook County Board of Commissioners (1874–78) ===
In 1874, he was elected to the Cook County Board of Commissioners. At this time, Holden had briefly joined the Democratic Party as a member of the local "People's Party" sect.

From 1876 to 1877, Holden was the chairman of the Cook County Board of Commissioners. While he was again a Republican, many were untrusting at this time of Holden's loyalty to the Republican Party.

== Death ==
Holden died on February 9, 1905, in Matteson, Illinois, where he was spending the winter. He had been sick for several weeks with pneumonia and "weakness of the heart". At the time he died, he lived in Chicago at 1387 West Monroe Street.

== Personal life ==
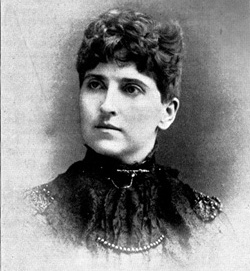
Photograph of Holden's wife Sarah

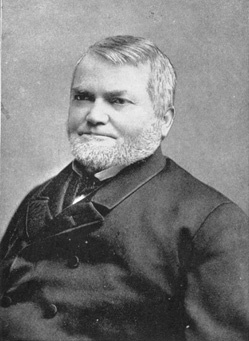
Holden, circa 1895

On September 17, 1855, Holden married Sarah J. Reynolds, the daughter of Isaac N. Reynolds and Ruth Ann Reynolds. She was the granddaughter of Abraham Holderman, the namesake of Holderman's Grove, Illinois.

During the Civil War, he raised a company for the Eighty-eighth Regiment of the Illinois Volunteers, which his brother Levi P. Holden led.

Holden was widowed on July 26, 1873.

On July 11, 1888, he married Thelma N. McCoy, daughter of Henry M. McCoy.

He had an adopted daughter named Sarah.

Holden was a member of the Illinois State Association of Veterans of the Mexican War, the Sons of the American Revolution, California Pioneers' Association of Chicago, Old Settlers' Society of Cook County, and the German Old Settler's Association (which gave him a gold medal in 1888).

Holden's extended family had numerous members who were well-involved in Chicago politics. This included Charles N. Holden, his cousin.
