= Delaware Building =

- U.S. National Register of Historic Places
- Chicago Landmark
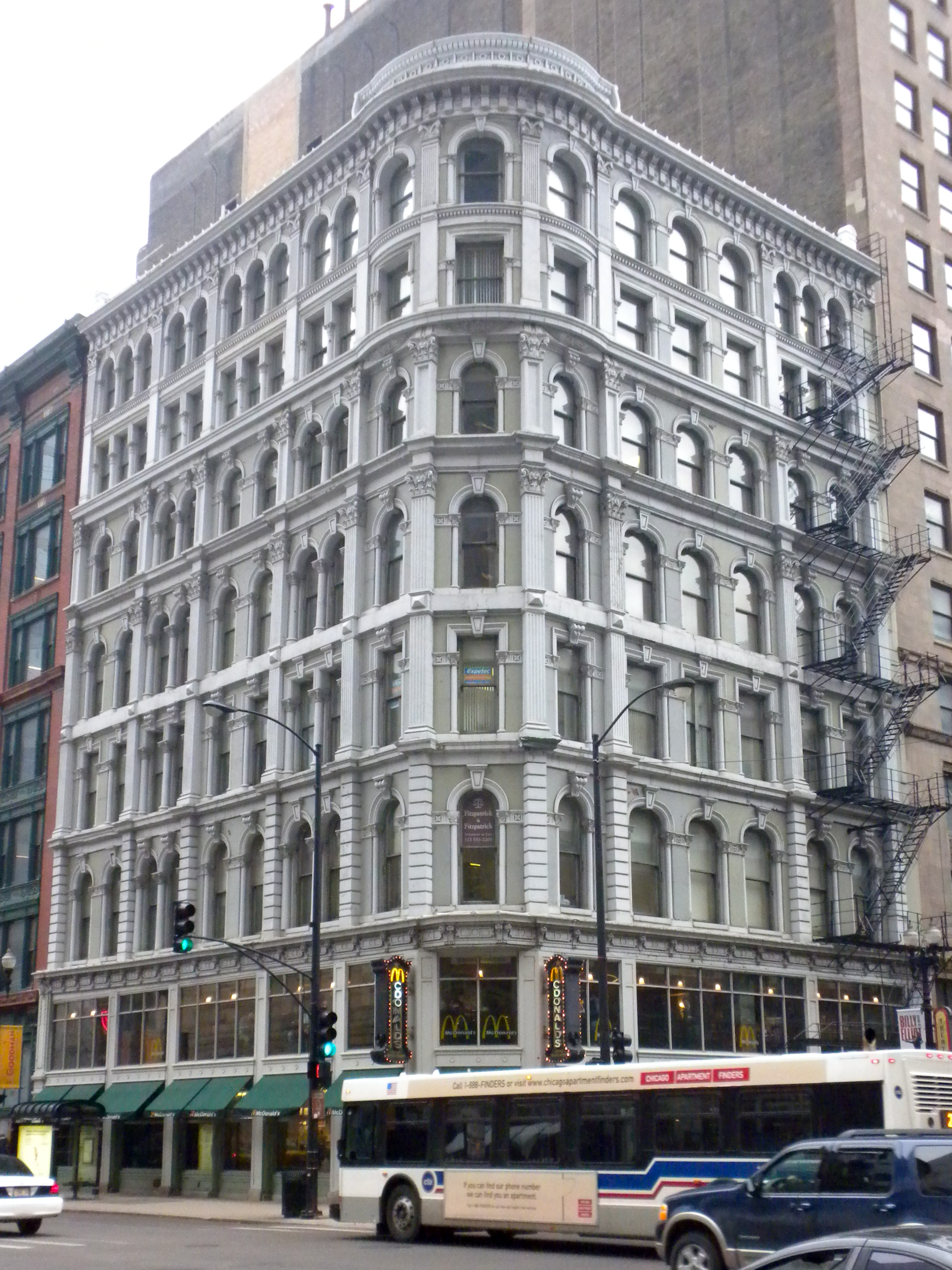

- Location within Illinois
- Location: Chicago, Illinois
- Coordinates: 41°53′5.16″N 87°37′44.93″W
- Built: 1872
- Architect: Wheelock & Thomasç
- Architectural style: Italianate
- NRHP reference No.: 74000749

Significant dates
- Added to NRHP: July 18, 1974
- Designated CHICL: November 23, 1983

The Delaware Building is a building in the Chicago Loop built in the massive rebuilding effort after the 1871 Great Chicago Fire. It is significant for being one of the few buildings to maintain its 1870s character, as an Italianate structure, in an area dominated by more modern structures. The building is also notable for its early use of a precast concrete façade. The building was designated a Chicago Landmark on November 23, 1983, and listed on the National Register of Historic Places on July 18, 1974.

As built, the building had five floors with a basement. The first two stories were primarily metal and glass to provide storefront windows for displays. In 1889, two additional floors were added, and three bays were removed from the Randolph Avenue façade.

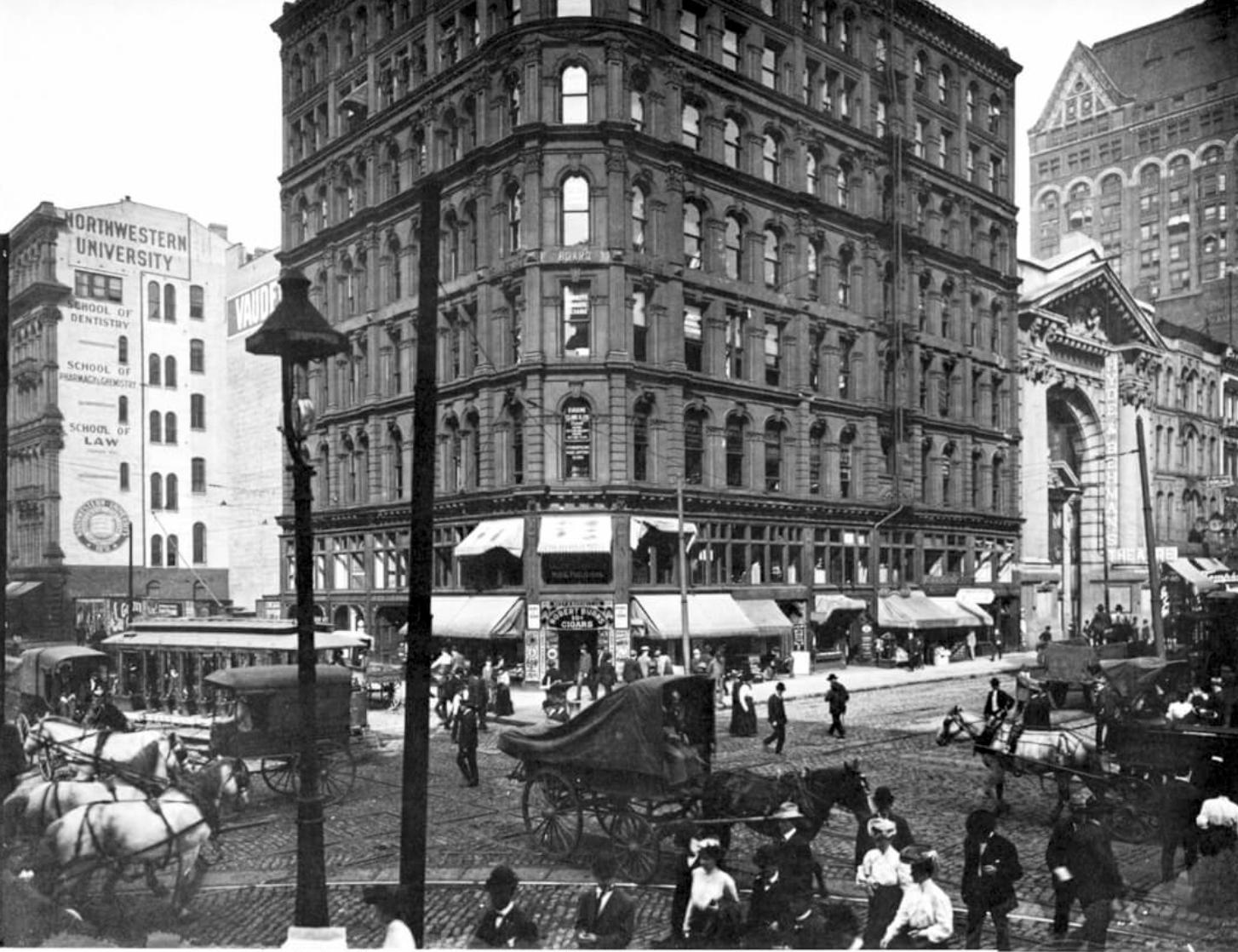
Delaware Building looking northeast, c. 1903
