= 1861 Chicago mayoral election =

- April 16, 1861
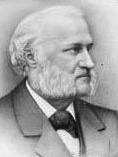

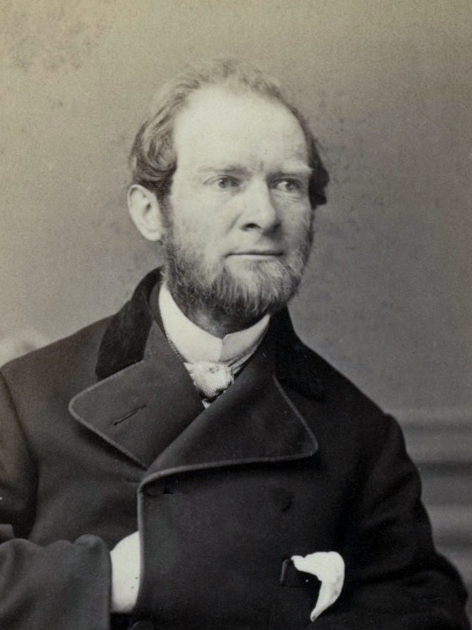
Nominee	Julian Sidney Rumsey	Thomas Barbour Bryan
Party	Republican	People's
Popular vote	8,274	6,601
Percentage	55.62%	44.38%
Mayor before election
John Wentworth
Democratic
Elected mayor
Julian Sidney Rumsey
Republican

The 1861 Chicago mayoral election, was held on April 16, Republican Julian Sidney Rumsey defeated People's nominee Thomas Barbour Bryan by a ten-point margin. The election took place on April 16, 1861.

The election was the first of four Chicago mayoral elections which took place during the course of the American Civil War.

== Background ==
The Republican Party had been victorious in the presidential and gubernatorial elections held months earlier in November 1860.

The municipal election season came on the tail of the fall of Fort Sumter. Both parties referred to their tickets as “Union”.

== Campaign ==
=== Nominating of candidates ===
On April 15 the Democrats held a meeting where they urged the election of their ticket to maintain the union.

Both parties adopted strong support for the union and its cause in the war.

Democratic ("People's") nominee, Thomas Barbour Bryan, was a Chicago business leader. Bryan was seen to be a far more prominent figure than Rumsey at the time of the election. Bryan had been drafted for mayor by a number of acquaintances to run on what the being dubbed "The People's Ticket". Unaware at the time that he'd be running in opposition to the Republican Party, Bryan reluctantly accepted. He was reported to, ultimately, have seemed somewhat relieved by his ultimate defeat in the polls. He did not desire to be mayor of the city, nor did he want to cause disarray or fractures in the Republican Party at the time that the civil war was beginning. Rumsey was also a largely unwilling candidate, and did actually not desire to be mayor.

=== Attacks on the allegiances of the Democratic ("People's") ticket ===
Ahead of the elections, the Chicago Times touted in Bryan's defense the claim that he had voted for the victorious Republican nominee, Abraham Lincoln, in the 1860 United States presidential election.

Ultimately, Republicans primarily took issue not with Bryan nominee for mayor, who many Republicans believed to be a unionist of strong character, but rather with the overall Democratic ticket for the municipal elections. Many Republicans felt uncomfortable with the fact that the Democratic ticket was strongly supported by the Chicago Times. The Chicago Tribune attacked the Times-supported ticket which Bryan headed as consisting of faux-unionists sympathetic to southern secession, writing,

We have a class of men in this city who correspond exactly with those Virginia Cow-Boys and Tories, many of them from the [state of Virginia]...they expect to carry the municipal elections of Chicago by sailing under false colors. The Unionism to which they are devoted is exactly of the stripe of the Richmond article. Let every honest and patriotic beware of the wolves in sheep's clothing."

The Tribune contrastingly characterized the Republican ticket as consisting unionist allies of President Lincoln's administration, writing

The true and only Union men are those uphold and support the President and his administration in their efforts to maintain the Constitution and enforce the laws–all others are bogus and enemies of their country.

=== Questioning of Bryan's eligibility to hold Chicago city office ===
Ahead of the election, questions were raised as to whether Bryan met the residency requirement to be elected mayor. Those doubting his eligibility cited that the city charter specified that voters in municipal elections must have been a resident of Chicago for the six-month period immediately. It was argued that if Bryan had not been a resident of Chicago from October 16, 1860, onwards, he would be intelligible to vote in the article, and that ineligibility to vote supposedly meant intelligibility to win election.

== Results ==
Despite the unusual times in which the election was held, much of the city voted along its typical party lines.

1861 Chicago mayoral election
Party	Candidate	Votes	%
Republican	Julian Sidney Rumsey	8,274	55.62
People's	Thomas Barbour Bryan	6,601	44.38
Turnout		14,875	
