= 1862 Chicago mayoral election =

- April 15, 1862
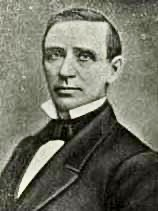

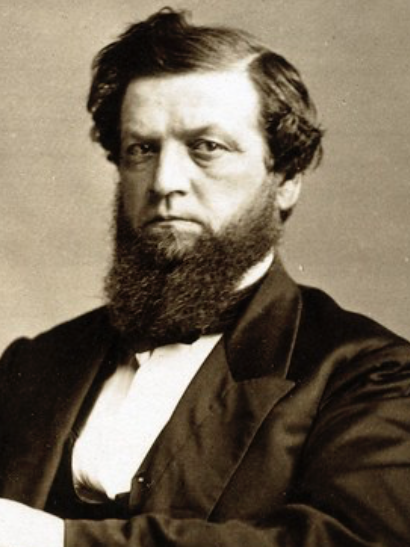
Nominee	Francis Cornwall Sherman	Charles N. Holden
Party	Democratic	Republican
Popular vote	7,437	6,254
Percentage	54.32%	45.68%
Mayor before election
Julian Sidney Rumsey
Republican
Elected mayor
Francis Cornwall Sherman
Democratic

In the Chicago mayoral election of 1862, Democrat Francis Cornwall Sherman won a second non-consecutive term, defeating Republican Party nominee Charles N. Holden.

Sherman had previously served as mayor two decades earlier, after winning the 1841 election. He had also been an unsuccessful candidate in the 1856 mayoral election.

== Campaign ==
The election was held on April 15, 1862. It was the second of four Chicago mayoral elections which took place during the course of the American Civil War. It was also last regularly scheduled Chicago mayoral election to a one-year term.

Democratic nominee Francis Cornwall Sherman, was a businessman who had previously served as mayor from 1841 through 1842. He was also supported by a nonpartisan ticket which bore the slogan "for the Union and the Constitution". Due to the fact that his son was a noted brigadier in the Union Army, Sherman was able to comfortably avoid accusations that his own loyalties sided anywhere but with the Union.

Charles N. Holden, a former Chicago alderman and former Chicago City Treasurer, was the nominee of the Republican Party. Efforts had been made for the party to nominate former congressman and mayor John Wentworth. However, Holden supporters succeeded in getting him nominated over Wentworth. Some Wentworth supporters, angered over this, placed their support behind Sherman instead.

== Results ==
1862 Chicago mayoral election
Party	Candidate	Votes	%
Democratic	Francis Cornwall Sherman	7,437	54.32
Republican	Charles N. Holden	6,254	45.68
Turnout		12,508	
