= Thomas Barbour Bryan =

American businessman and politician

Thomas Bryan
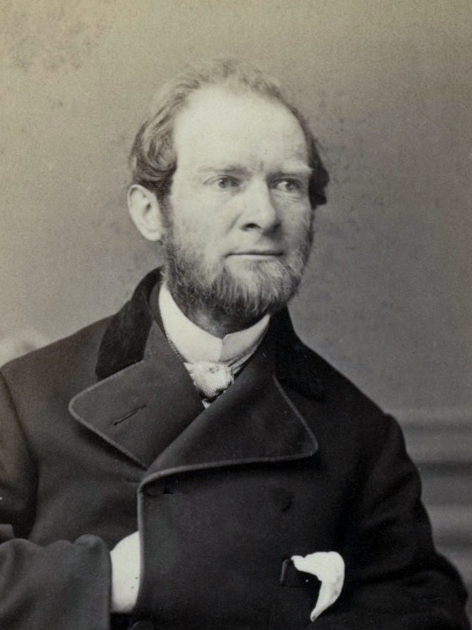
- Bryan in the 1860s

Member of the Board of Commissioners of the District of Columbia
- In office December 3, 1877 – July 1, 1878
- Appointed by: Rutherford B. Hayes
- President: William Dennison Jr. (de facto)
- Preceded by: John H. Ketcham
- Succeeded by: Seat abolished

Personal details
- Born: Thomas Barbour Bryan; December 22, 1828 Alexandria, Virginia, U.S.
- Died: January 26, 1906 (aged 77) Washington, D.C., U.S.
- Resting place: Oak Hill Cemetery
- Party: Republican
- Spouse: Jennie Byrd Page (m. 1850; died 1898)
- Children: 3, including Charles and Jennie
- Parent: Daniel Bryan (father)
- Relatives: James Barbour (uncle); Philip P. Barbour (uncle); Thomas Barbour (grandfather); Barbour Lathrop (nephew); Bryan Lathrop (nephew); Florence Lathrop Field Page (niece); John Barton Payne (son-in-law); Jedediah Hyde Lathrop (brother-in-law); Andrew Wylie Jr. (brother-in-law)
- Education: Harvard University (BA, LLB)
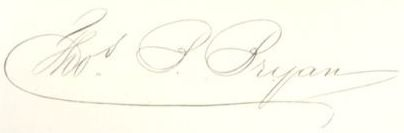
- Signature

Thomas Barbour Bryan (December 22, 1828 – January 26, 1906) was an American businessman, lawyer, and politician.

Born in Virginia, a member of the prestigious Barbour family on his mother's side, Bryan largely made a name for himself in Chicago, Illinois. He was involved in many ventures in the city, such as the creation of Graceland Cemetery, and was active in the city's politics, having twice been nominated for mayor (in 1861 and 1863). He was a strong unionist during the American Civil War. He played a key role in the development of the Chicago suburb of Elmhurst, Illinois, where he resided much of his life, and is often referred to as "The Father of Elmhurst". He was also instrumental in Chicago being awarded the World's Columbian Exposition, and was involved in the 1893 exposition's organization and operation. In addition to his involvement in Chicago politics, Bryan spent a brief period as a commissioner of the District of Columbia.

== Early life, education, and family ==
Bryan was born in Alexandria, Virginia, on December 22, 1828. His father was Daniel Bryan, and his mother was Mary Thomas Barbour Bryan (née Barbour). Bryan's father was a poet and a lawyer, abolitionist, and statesman who served from 1821 to 1853 as Alexandria's postmaster, and who, from 1818 through 1820 served in the Senate of Virginia.

A member of the esteemed Barbour family through his mother, Bryan's maternal uncles were James Barbour and Philip P. Barbour. His maternal grandfather was Thomas Barbour. His nephews through his sister Mariana Thomas Lathrop and her husband (Jedediah Hyde Lathrop) included Bryan Lathrop, Barbour Lathrop, and Florence Lathrop Field Page. Bryan would later go form a personal and business relationship with Bryan Lathrop. Through his sister Mary Caroline and her husband Andrew Wylie Jr., one of his nephews was Horace Wylie.

Sources disagree as to whether Bryan's paternal great-uncle was Daniel Boone, as it is unclear whether his father was Boone's nephew. If he is Boone's great-nephew, his paternal grandfather would have been William Bryan (one of the founders of Bryan Station) and his maternal grandmother had been Mary Boone Bryan.

Bryan was educated at Virginia's top preparatory schools. For four years, Bryan held a clerkship with the post office that his father oversaw. The clerkship paid $300 annually, which Bryan saved up before leaving to attend Harvard University. Bryan graduated from Harvard Law School in 1848. While attending Harvard, he lived in nearby Boston at the house of a German woman who taught him the German language. He would, soon after graduating, publish grammar meant to help Germans learn to read, write, and speak the English language. This grammar received praise from German press and from professors.

== Adult life and career ==
=== Early career ===
After graduating from Harvard Law School, Bryan practiced law in Cincinnati until 1852. At one point in his legal career, he was attorney for the estate of deceased president William Henry Harrison.

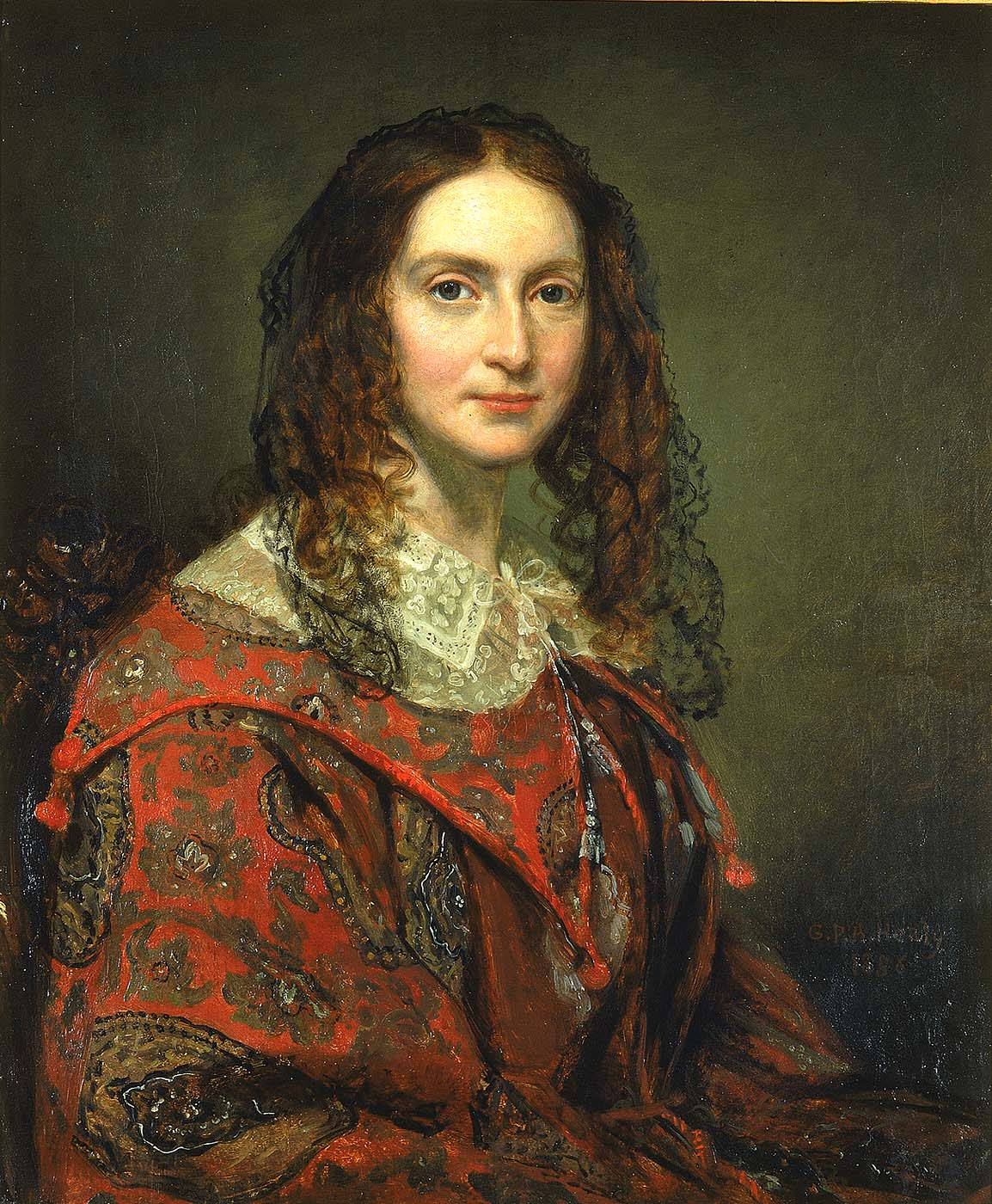
Mrs. Thomas B. Bryan, an 1856 George Peter Alexander Healy painting of Bryan's wife Jennie, which is now in the collection of the Smithsonian American Art Museum

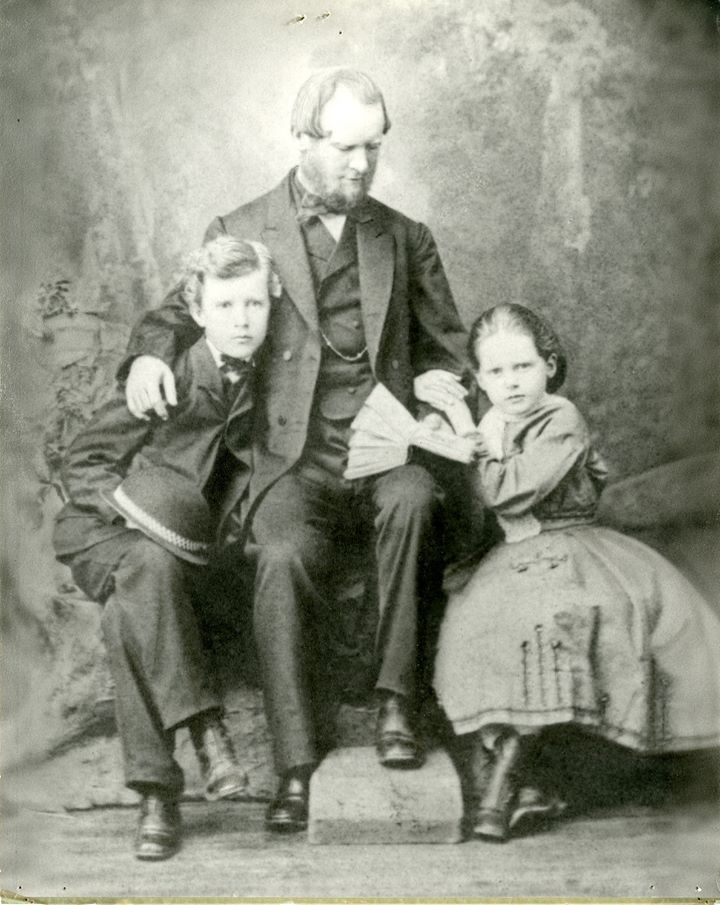
Bryan with son Charles and daughter Jennie, circa 1865

In 1850, in a wedding ceremony held in Newport, Kentucky, Bryan married Jennie "Jane" Byrd Page who became Mrs. Jennie Byrd Bryan. His wife was related, by marriage, to the prominent Page and Lee families of Virginia. She was the daughter of an episcopal clergyman.

=== Move to Illinois ===
In 1852, Bryan and his wife moved to Chicago, where he had acquired broad real estate interests. He was also involved in the construction of railroads. Over the next half-century, Bryan would be a booster in the growth of the city. Bryan also established a reputation for himself as a gifted orator.

Bryan and his wife Jennie had three children, two of whom (a son and a daughter) would live to adulthood. The son they lost as a child, Daniel Page Bryan, who died on April 12, 1855, at the age of five. Their adult son was Charles Page Bryan, born in 1855, who would have a career as a lawyer, politician, and diplomat. Their daughter, born in 1857, was also named Jennie Byrd Bryan. She would become an artist and philanthropist, and would, in 1913, marry John Barton Payne, adopting his surname.

Bryan's initial residence in Chicago was at 103 Michigan Avenue, near Madison Street. This was, at the time, a fashionable neighborhood. Here, he was neighbors with many prominent Chicagoans, including Matthew Laflin. Shortly after living here, he built a house at the northwest corner of Wabash Avenue and Jackson Street.

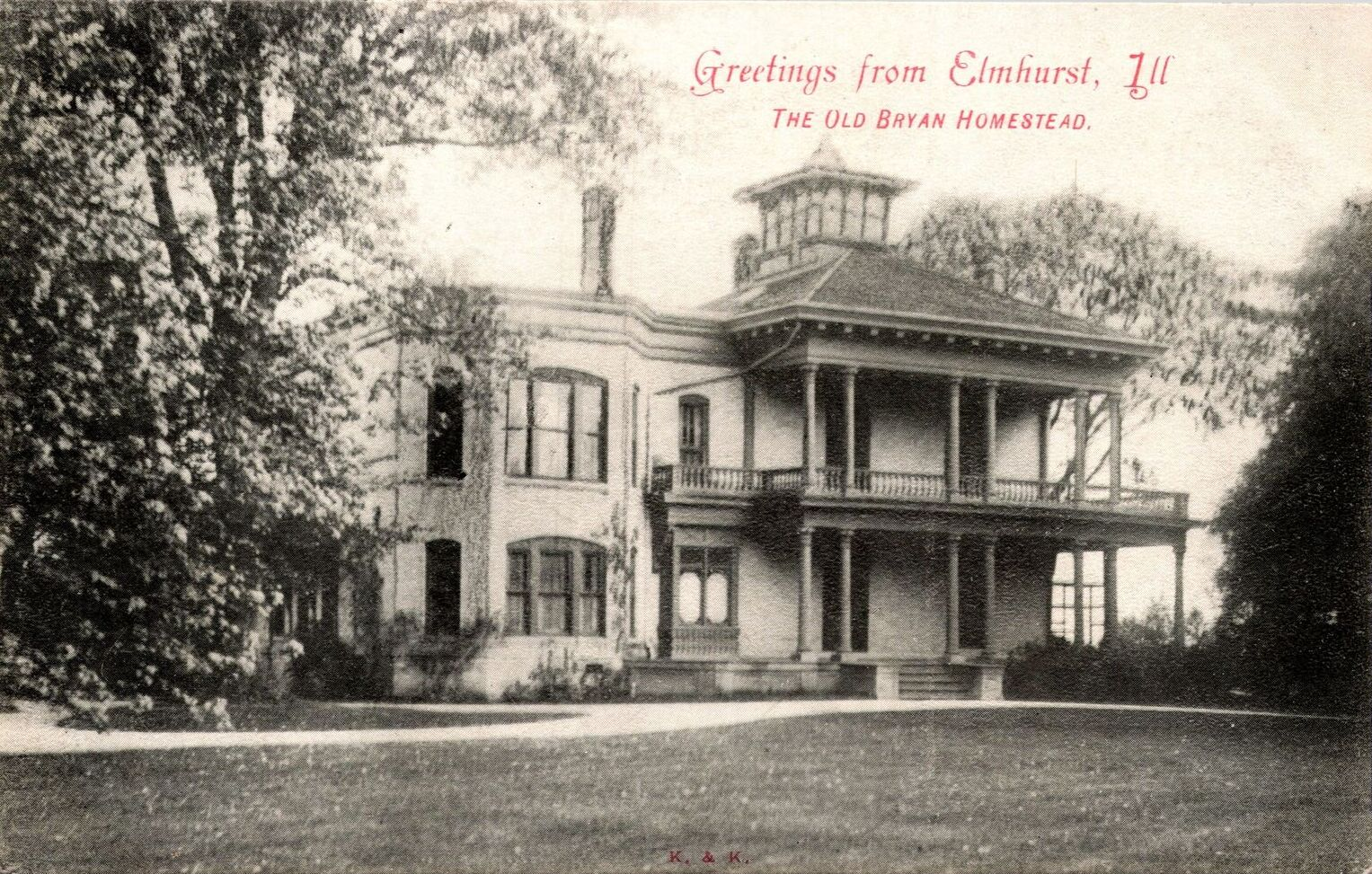
Postcard of Bryan's residence at the Byrd's Nest estate in Elmhurst, Illinois

Sometime between 1856 and 1859, Bryan settled in Cottage Hill, Illinois (modern-day Elmhurst), building a 1,000-acre estate there named "Byrd's Nest". While he awaited the completion of this residence, he and his family lived in Cottage Hill's Hill Cottage Tavern, where he befriended the artist George Peter Alexander Healy. Healy would be a lifelong friend, and in 1857 bought the Hill Cottage from Barbour to serve as a residence for his own family, making them neighbors.

Once completed, the Byrd's Nest estate included a 21-room manor, a separate garden house, and a man-made lake. Living there, he would commute daily to Chicago on the Chicago and North Western Railway. In the 1860 United States census, Bryan was recorded to be the wealthiest person in DuPage County, with a net worth said to exceed $325,000. In 1864, he would sell 26 acres of his land to his brother-in-law Jedediah Hyde Lathrop, who built his own estate named "Huntington" on the site.

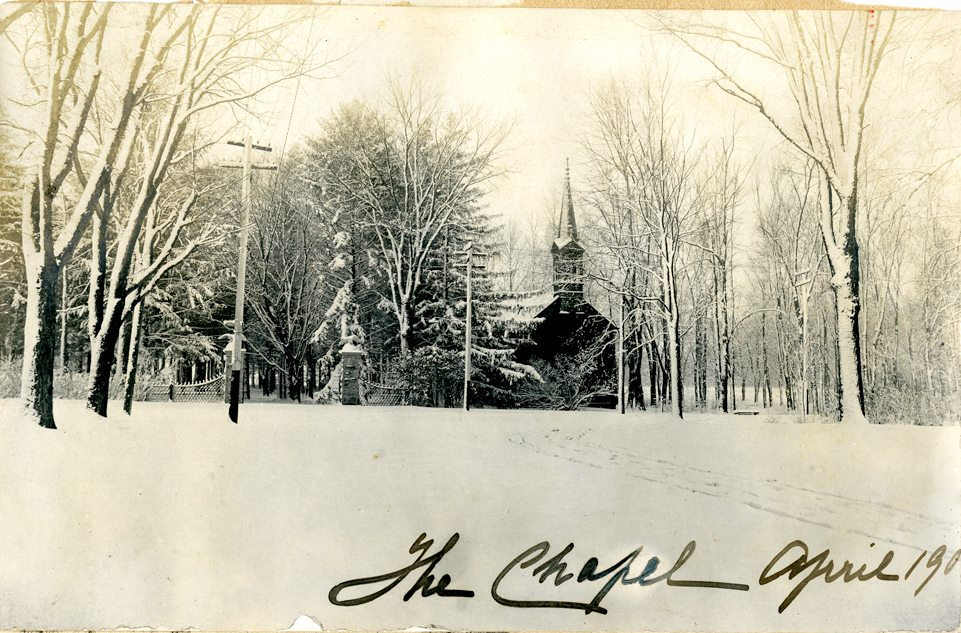
Byrd's Nest chapel (constructed in 1865)

Bryan would ultimately play an important role in the development of the town of Cottage Hill/Elmhurst. He is often referred to as "The Father of Elmhurst". In 1860, Bryan converted the bowling alley in his Byrd's Nest residence's basement into a chapel space where he invited local residents to hold services. He did so in response to news that a former church building in the city of Chicago was being converted into bowling alley. The chapel was one of the community's first church spaces, and it proved popular enough that he was motivated five years later to erect a separate building on his estate housing a new chapel. The 1865 Byrd's Nest chapel stood where the intersection of Cottage Hill Avenue and St. Charles Road is today. It was demolished in 1914, but its former congregation is a precursor to the town's Church of Our Savior which continues to exist. In 1869, Bryan assembled a number of Cottage Hill residents and proposed the idea of renaming the community to "Elmhurst", a name reflective of the German heritage of many town residents and the many elm trees that Bryan had planted across the community over the course of the preceding ten years. This proposal was successful. That same year, Bryan and his wife Jennie sold 30 acres of their land in Elmhurst to the German Evangelical Synod of the Northwest for $10,000. In 1871, the Synod established the Elmhurst Pro-seminary on the property, a seminary which would eventually become Elmhurst University.

In 1860, Bryan established Chicago's Graceland Cemetery in partnership with William Butler Ogden, Sidney Sawyer, Edwin H. Sheldon, and George Peter Alexander Healy. He had been motivated to establish a new cemetery after being disappointed by the "neglected and actually repulsive condition" of Chicago's City Cemetery when his son Daniel was buried there. He sought to create a "rural burying ground, more remote from and worthy of the city [of Chicago]." However, he placed these ambitions on hold after Rosehill Cemetery was opened by a group independent of Bryan's efforts. However, after he was offered the presidency of the company that operated Rosehill Cemetery, Bryan became motivated to pursue his shelved plans to establish his own cemetery. He then got to work, becoming the inaugural president of the Graceland Cemetery Association. Healy served as treasurer. He purchased land for his cemetery from the heirs of Justin Butterfield, collaborated with a number of landscape architects to design the cemetery, and fought challenges from the owners of adjacent properties who opposed his plans to transform the site into a cemetery. In April 1860, the first burial at Graceland Cemetery occurred when Bryan had his late son Daniel reinterred there. Graceland Cemetery was formally dedicated that August.

1860 also saw the opening of Bryan Hall, a music hall which Bryan constructed in Chicago on Clark Street across from the city's courthouse. With a capacity of between 500 and 600 people, it was reported to be the largest hall of its kind in the metropolitan area at the time of its opening. It would remain the city's primary venue until the opening of Crosby's Opera House.

=== Mayoral campaigns and activism during the Civil War ===
Bryan was, twice, reluctantly a nominee for mayor of Chicago. In 1861, Bryan was the People's Ticket nominee for mayor of Chicago. He lost the election to Republican Julian Sidney Rumsey by a sizable margin. Bryan had been drafted for mayor by a number of acquaintances to run on what the being dubbed "The People's Ticket". Unaware at the time that he'd be running in opposition to the Republican Party, Bryan reluctantly accepted. He was reported to, ultimately, have seemed somewhat relieved by his ultimate defeat in the polls. He did not desire to be mayor of the city, nor did he want to cause disarray or fractures in the Republican Party at the time that the Civil War was beginning. Bryan was the National Union (Republican) nominee for the office in 1863, losing by an incredibly narrow margin to incumbent mayor Francis Cornwall Sherman. He originally planned to contest the result over allegations of election fraud by the Democrats, but ultimately did not, not being concerned enough with the results, having been a reluctant candidate to begin with. In his first campaign speech of his 1863 effort, Bryan remarked that while he had not sought nomination, he would accept it in consideration of the cause of union amid the American Civil War, declaring agreement with the platform of the ticket he was nominated on,

The Union men I conceive to stand pledged to a hearty support of the Government in its efforts to suppress the accursed rebellion. Their platform, as I have more than once claimed, is simply a loving devotion and an inflexible fidelity to the Union.

A strong unionist, during the Civil War, Bryan funded a company of the 105th Infantry Regiment of Illinois Volunteers in the Civil War, named the "Bryan's Blues". He was a member of the Union Defense Committee. He was also president of the Northwestern Sanitary Fair, an event held in 1865 along the Chicago lakefront which raised more than $300,000 for Union soldiers. Interestingly, his wife had incidentally been in the company of Confederate Army general Robert E. Lee, a relative of hers by marriage, just days before the breakout of the Civil War.

=== Post-war and Great Chicago Fire ===
Bryan served in leadership roles for numerous Chicago organizations. From 1865 until 1906, Bryan served as president of the Chicago Soldiers' Home, which he also had helped to found. He was president of the Union League Club of Chicago.

In 1870, Bryan leased Bryan Hall to Richard M. Hooley for a period of five years, for $21,000 per year. It was renamed the Hooley Opera House.

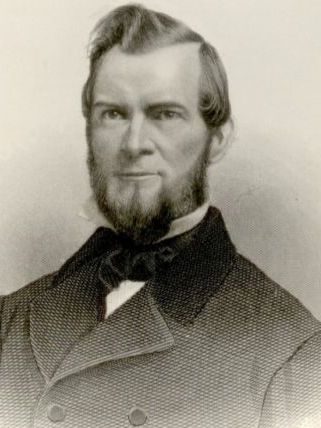
1871 engraving of Bryan

In the Great Chicago Fire of 1871, Bryan lost $2 million, with one significant part of this being the loss of his music hall in the fire. After the fire, he provided a number of people displaced with refuge at Byrd's Nest. Bryan was involved in helping revive the city after the fire. Shortly before the fire Bryan had founded the Federal Savings Bank and Safe Depository, also known as the Fidelity Safe Depository. Despite the burning of its building, the vaults and safes were intact, and their contents survived the fire. Bryan rebuilt a new structure for the institution quickly after the fire. He purchased the metal from the Chicago Court House Bell which he used to fashion an alarm for his company, selling the rest to H.S. Everhart & Company which commissioned the U.S. Mint to strike commemorative medals from the metal.

=== District of Columbia and Colorado ===
From December 3, 1877, through July 1, 1878, Bryan served as Commissioner of the District of Columbia. During this brief period, he and his wife briefly lived in Washington, D.C.

In 1878, Bryan stepped-down as president of Graceland Cemetery, turning over the presidency to his nephew Bryan Lathrop.

For a period of time, he and his wife moved to Colorado. At the time of the 1880 United States census, he was recorded as residing in Clear Creek County, Colorado. In the later 1880s, Bryan located his personal officers in Chicago's Home Insurance Building.

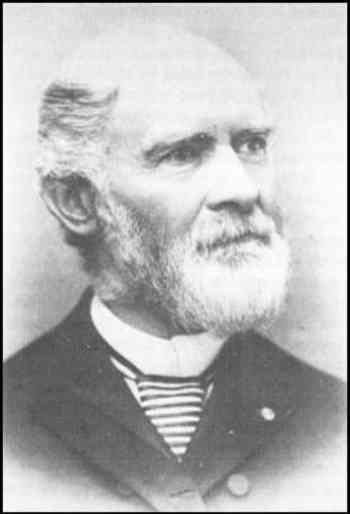
Bryan around the time of the World's Columbian Exposition

=== World's Columbian Exposition ===
Bryan was a leading figure in the effort to bring the World's Columbian Exposition to Chicago. Bryan convinced the Chicago City Council to pass legislation that would help the city in its efforts secure the world's fair. In 1890, he, alongside Chicago mayor DeWitt Clinton Cregier and former Illinois Central Railroad president Edward Turner Jeffery, gave the presentation for Chicago's bid to the fifteen member United States Senate committee that decided what location would be awarded the fair. Bryan's remarks were perhaps the most persuasive of the three speaking on behalf of the city. In his remarks Bryan, in part, retorted the hyperbolic and critical remarks about Chicago that had been issued by Chauncey Depew (who was representing New York City's interest in receiving the fair).

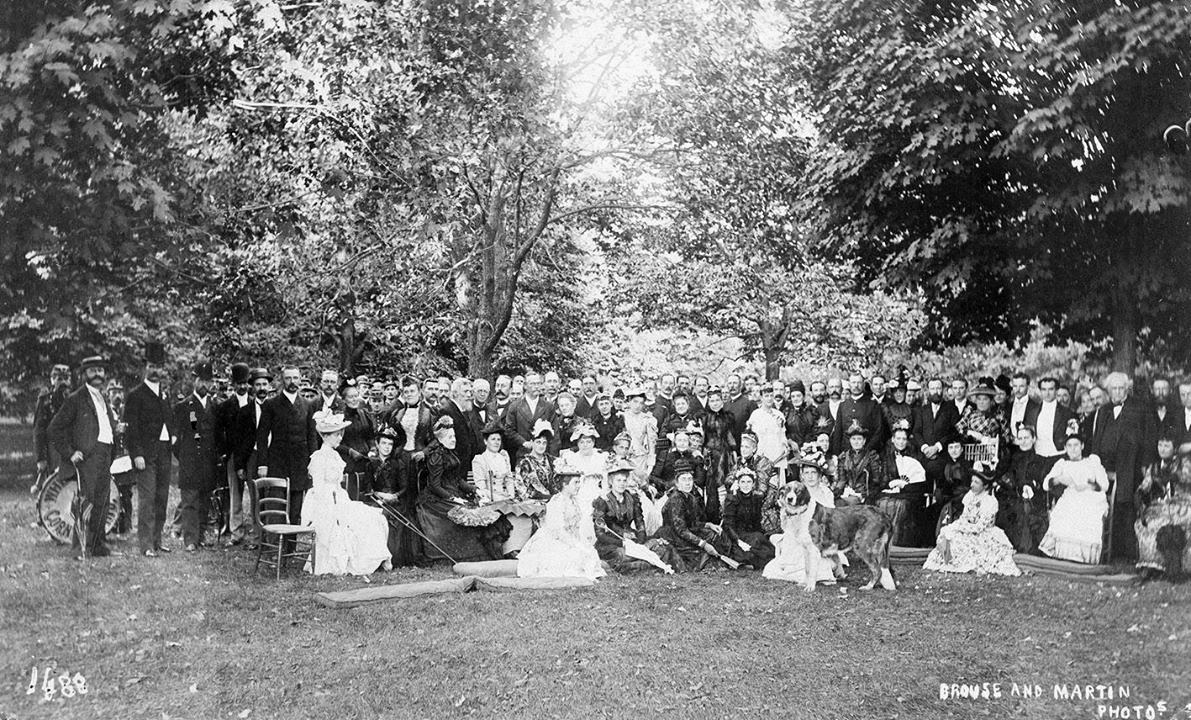
Bryan hosting the World's Columbian Exposition commissioners at his Byrd's Nest estate in 1893

After Chicago landed the fair, Bryan was appointed a commissioner-at-large of the World's Columbian Exposition Board created by federal legislation. He was ultimately the vice president of the World's Columbian Exposition, vice president of the World's Congress Auxiliary, Commissioner General of the Exposition and the Chairman of the Congresses Committee of Organization, and President of the World's Congress. Bryan worked successfully to convince the Chicago City Council, Illinois General Assembly and United States legislature to pass legislation providing assistance to the fair's organizers. In his travels through Europe promoting the exposition, he met with many ruling monarchs and Pope Leo XIII. During the exposition, he personally hosted many of the dignitaries and royals that attended the fair at his Byrd's Nest estate.

At the same time that he was organizing the world's exposition, Bryan fell victim to what ultimately turned out to be a scam run by H. H. Holmes, a con artist who was later discovered to also be a serial killer. He lost more than $9,000 after becoming involved in a copier machine business with Holmes at the advice Bryan's associate Fred Nind. Holmes had paid Bryan a $7,000 promissory note to acquire a 51% stake in the venture from Bryan. Holmes, however, never followed through with any cash compensation to Bryan. This was one of the largest amounts which Holmes was able to financially defraud any individual of in his long career of fraud. Holmes would go on to fraudulently use Bryan's name on the papers of this company and a number of other scam companies.

=== Later years and death ===
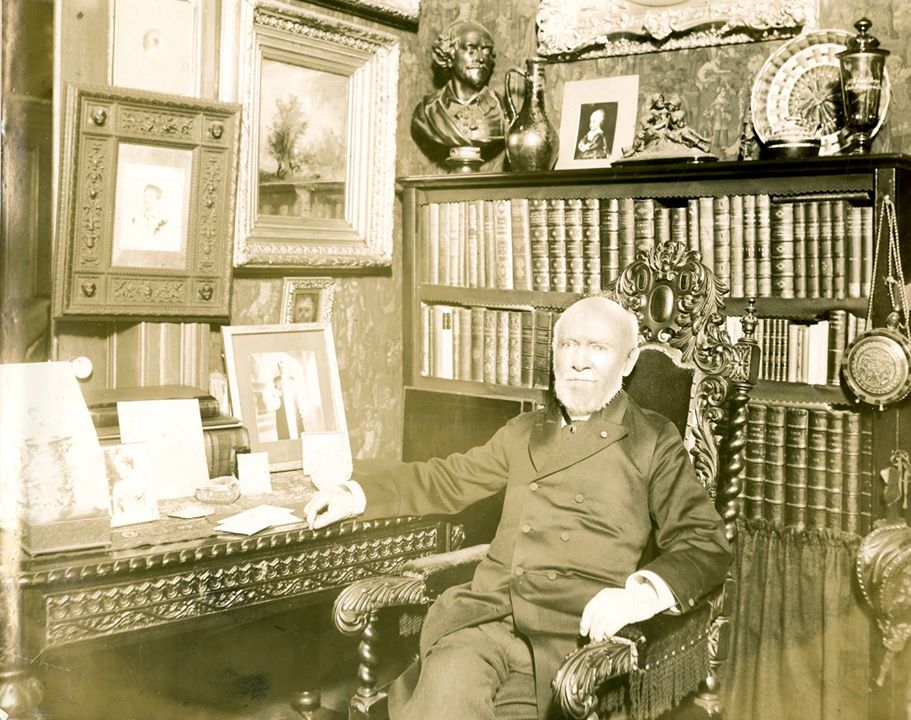
Bryan circa 1900

Bryan was widowed on March 5, 1898, when his wife of 48 years, Jennie, died at the age of 68 at their Byrd's Nest estate of paralysis that had impacted her brain and vocal organs, before reaching her heart. She had only developed the paralysis days earlier on March 3.

Bryan spent his last decade splitting time between Byrd's Nest and living out east, in Virginia and Washington, D.C. He died January 26, 1906, in Washington, D.C.

Bryan is buried at Oak Hill Cemetery in Washington, D.C., where the Bryan family had a burying ground. His wife Jennie had been buried at Oak Hill Cemetery after her 1898 death. His son Charles would be buried in the cemetery after his death in 1918, as would his daughter Jennie after her death in 1919 and his son-in-law John Barton Payne after his death in 1935.

After his death, ownership of the Byrd's Nest estate passed to his son, Charles. However, Charles rarely lived there due to his service as a diplomat. In 1920, the estate was given to a charitable organization for the purposes of serving as an orphanage. After this proved unsuccessful, the estate was sold to a real estate developer in 1924 and was subsequently subdivided for residential development. No physical remnants remain of the estate that Bryan had built.

== Art collection and patronage of George Peter Alexander Healy ==
Bryan commissioned many works by George Peter Alexander Healy. The two had become friends around the time Bryan moved to Cottage Hill (Elmhurst). In 1857, Healy purchased the Hill Cottage (a cottage in Cottage Hill) from Bryan, where Healy lived for next six years. This made him neighbors with Bryan during this period. Healy created a number of paintings of the Bryan family. He also partnered with Bryan in the founding of Graceland Cemetery. In addition, Bryan's daughter Jennie became a student of Healy's. On one occasion in 1860, Bryan purchased all the paintings Healy's entire inventory of Heale's painting gallery to and displayed the works in a hall that he owned on Dearborn Street.

In Bryan's art collection were portraits which Henry Clay, Edward Everett, Henry Wadsworth Longfellow, Daniel Webster had posed for. Bryan also owned a collection of paintings of all presidents of the United States, many of which had been painted by Healy. Bryan gifted his collection of presidential portraits to the Corcoran Gallery of Art.

After Bryan's death, many of the paintings of Healy's that he still owned were passed on to his daughter Jennie. After her death in 1919, in 1920, Jennie Byrd's Payne's widowed husband, John Barton Payne, gave a collection of forty masterpieces to the State of Virginia, a gift valued at time at over $1 million. In this gift were several paintings Bryan commissioned from Healy. This gift, which was given by Payne alongside a financial gift of $100,000 for a museum to house the art, came with a stipulation that the state must match his gift. This was eventually done in 1932, and construction began on the Virginia Museum of Fine Arts.

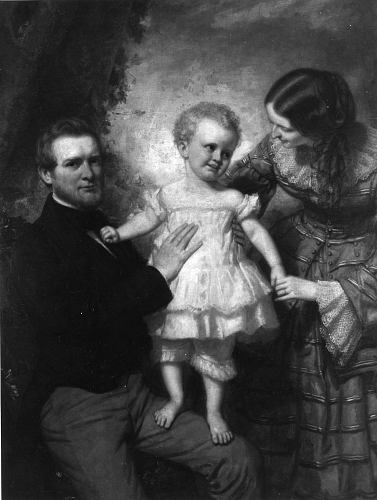
Thomas Barbour Bryan and Family by George Peter Alexander Healy, an 1856 portrait of Bryan with his family, which is now in the collection of the Smithsonian American Art Museum

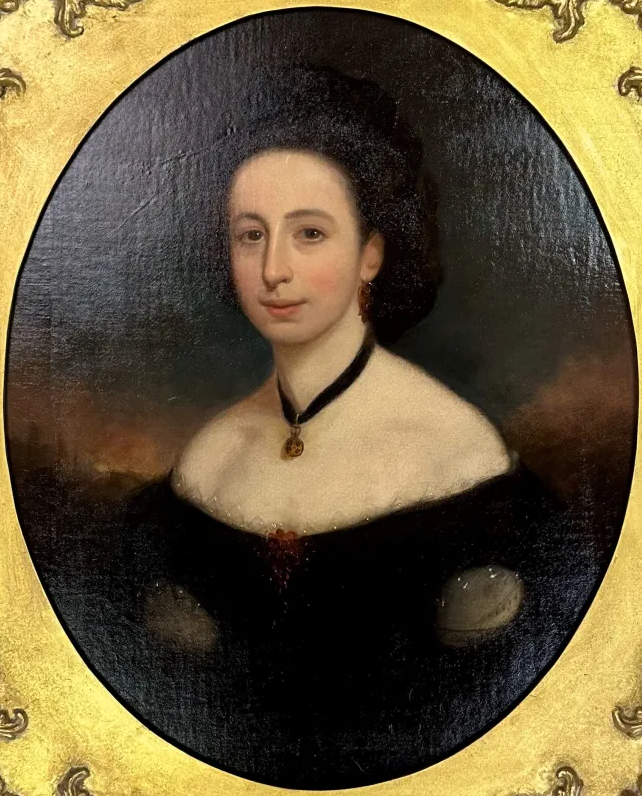
1859 portrait by Healy of Bryan's wife, which is now in the collection of the Elmhurst History Museum

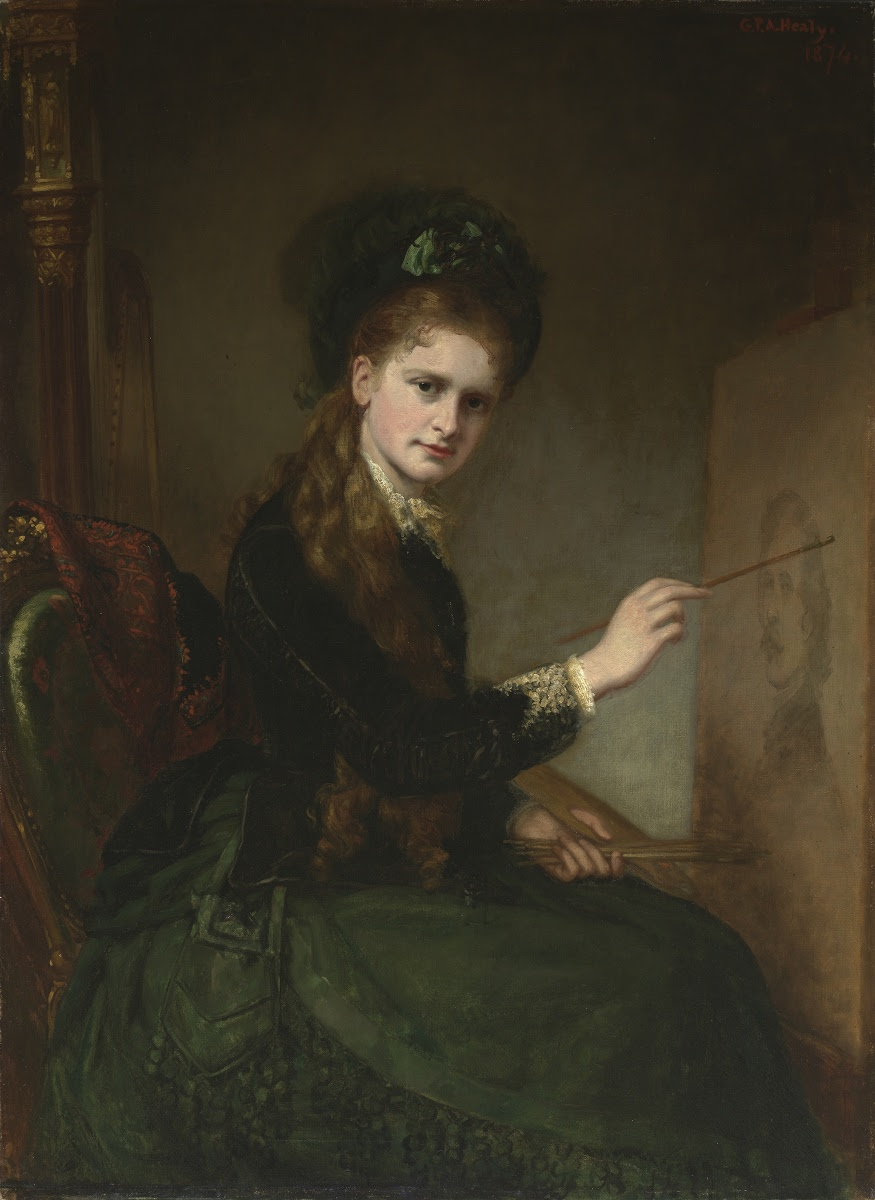
Jennie Byrd Bryan by George Peter Alexander Healy, an 1874 portrait of Bryan's daughter, which is now in the collection of the Virginia Museum of Fine Arts

== Collector of historic memorabilia ==
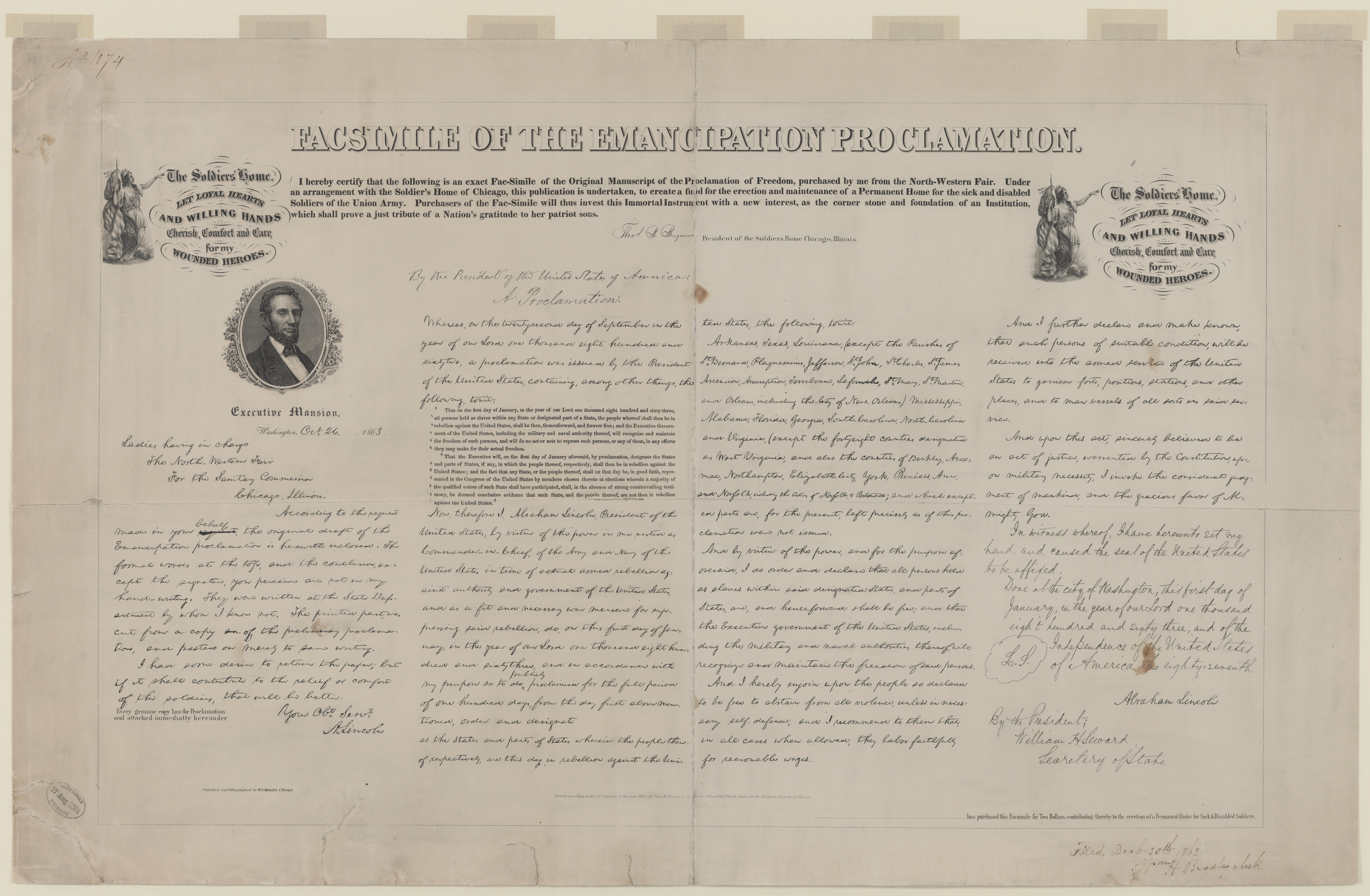
Facsimile which Bryan printed of the original handwritten draft of the Emancipation Proclamation

In his life, Bryan acquired several noteworthy pieces of historic memorabilia.

After the Great Chicago Fire, Bryan purchased the broken remains of the bell from the city's lost courthouse at an auction. He kept parts of the bell, but sold most of the bell's remains to H.S. Everhart & Company, who made one-inch tall miniature bells as souvenirs. The courthouse bell was notable in relation to the fire, as it had been one of the bells in the city that was rung to warn citizens of the fire.

After notable people had been invited to send items to the Northwestern Sanitary Fair to auction, Abraham Lincoln sent the original handwritten draft of the Emancipation Proclamation. Bryan was successful in bidding for it, paying $3,000 for it, the item being the highest bid item on auction. Bryan had lithographic copies made and sold for the benefit of the Sanitary Commission. Bryan gifted the document to the Chicago Soldier's Home, who in turn entrusted it to the Chicago Historical Society for safekeeping. However, this original document was lost in the Great Chicago Fire.

== Electoral history ==
1861 Chicago mayoral election
Party	Candidate	Votes	%
Republican	Julian Sidney Rumsey	8,274	55.62
People's	Thomas Barbour Bryan	6,601	44.38
Total votes		14,875	100

1863 Chicago mayoral election
Party	Candidate	Votes	%
Democratic	Francis Cornwall Sherman	10,252	50.39
National Union	Thomas Barbour Bryan	10,095	49.62
Total votes		20,347	100

Party political offices
Preceded by John Wentworth	Democratic nominee for Mayor of Chicago; Endorsed; 1861	Succeeded by Francis Sherman
Preceded by Charles N. Holden	Republican nominee for Mayor of Chicago; 1863	Succeeded by George Gage
Political offices
Preceded by John H. Ketcham	Member of the Board of Commissioners of the District of Columbia; 1877–1878	Seat abolished
