= GoodKids MadCity Englewood =

GoodKids MadCity-Englewood
- Formation: 2018
- Type: Non-profit
- Headquarters: Englewood, Chicago
- Mentor: Kofi Ademola
- Revenue: $285,000 (2022)
- Expenses: $294,000 (2022)
- Website: https://www.gkmcenglewood.com/

GoodKids MadCity Englewood (GKMC-E) is a 501(c)(3) nonprofit organization based in the Englewood neighborhood of Chicago, Illinois. It was founded by Chicago youth in 2018 with the aim to be an anti-gun violence group. GKMC-E organizes youth engagement events, community service projects, and conducts workforce development programs.

== History ==
GKMC-E was founded in 2018 in the wake of the Parkland, Florida shooting. Their mission is to provide support to young people affected by shootings and violent crime, as well as to advocate for policy changes to address social drivers of violence. GKMC-E has advocated for policy changes that include the "Peacebook" initiative, challenged directives, and organized community events such as food and clothing drives.

During the 2023 Chicago mayoral election, the group hosted a town hall meeting and five candidates showed up to speak.

== Leadership ==
GKMC-E meets on a weekly basis to catch up and plan events and activities. GKMC-E is a youth-led democratic organization with an adult mentor, activist Kofi Ademola. Ademola, who is 38 years old, had previously done work with Black Lives Matter Chicago.

== Partnerships ==
GKMC-E has a sister organization in Baltimore called GoodKidsMadCity-Baltimore (GKMC-Bmore). GKMC-Bmore organized protests against police brutality following the death of Breonna Taylor.

In August 2020, GKMC-E gathered with Black Lives Matter Chicago, Chicago Alliance Against Racist and Political Repression, The Let Us Breathe Collective, Black Youth Project 100, Care Not Cops, and Black Abolitionist Network. These groups organized a protest to express injustice for Latrell Allen who was arrested for shooting at police and was held on a $1 million bond. GKMC-E and the other organizations protested that this was an unfair situation because there were no evidence or body cam footage to back up the incident.

In 2023 GKMC-E partnered with other neighborhood organizations to participate in a basketball game called Hoops in the Hood. The organizations included GKMC-E, ABC Pilsen, Teamwork Englewod and BUILD. Hoops in the Hood has been held for 17 years and is used to bring the kids of Chicago together with music and entertainment.

== Recent work ==
GKMC-E has weekly meetings where they discuss events and develop ways they can give free, safe recreation to youth in Englewood.

In October 2020 GKMC-E held an event they called a "love march" in Englewood. The march took place in front of the 7th police district headquarters. The members goal was to bring attention to the policing in the community and to spread love.

GKMC-E proposed the idea of a Peace Book ordinance. The Peace Book ordinance aims to reallocate two percent of the Police’s $1.7 billion budget to be earmarked for mental health services, job training programs, restorative justice training, and appointing peacekeepers for the community. In 2022, members of this organization, along with Alderman Leslie Hairston and Alderman Roderick Sawyer took their ideas to Lori Lightfoot in a City Council meeting. Mayor Lori Lightfoot declined funding.

The Peace Book Ordinance was first proposed in 2022, and then again in 2023. On February 22, 2023 they presented their ideas of the Peace Book Ordinance to the Chicago mayoral candidates. Out of the nine mayoral candidates five showed up; Brandon Johnson, Sophia King, Roderick Sawyer, Kam Buckner and Ja’mal Green. During the meeting GKMC expressed that if the future Mayor of Chicago funded their program they would change their name to "GoodKids GreatCity."

On Halloween in 2022, a curfew was implemented on the city’s youth so that they could not be out past 10pm. GKMC-E filed a lawsuit against the City of Chicago so that their younger members could keep an eye on the police in Hyde Park during the holiday. They asked that the Chicago Police were to not disturb the members participating in this event on Halloween. The idea behind this event is to prevent and discourage police misconduct and make sure they keep the peace.
