= 2023 Chicago mayoral election =

- February 28, 2023 (first round); April 4, 2023 (runoff)
- Turnout: 35.85% ▲0.65pp (first round); 38.67% ▲5.78pp (second round)
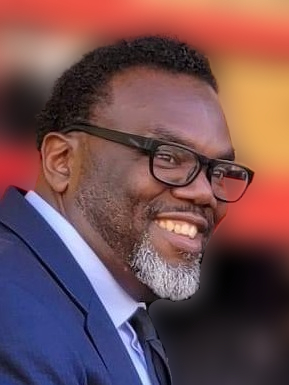

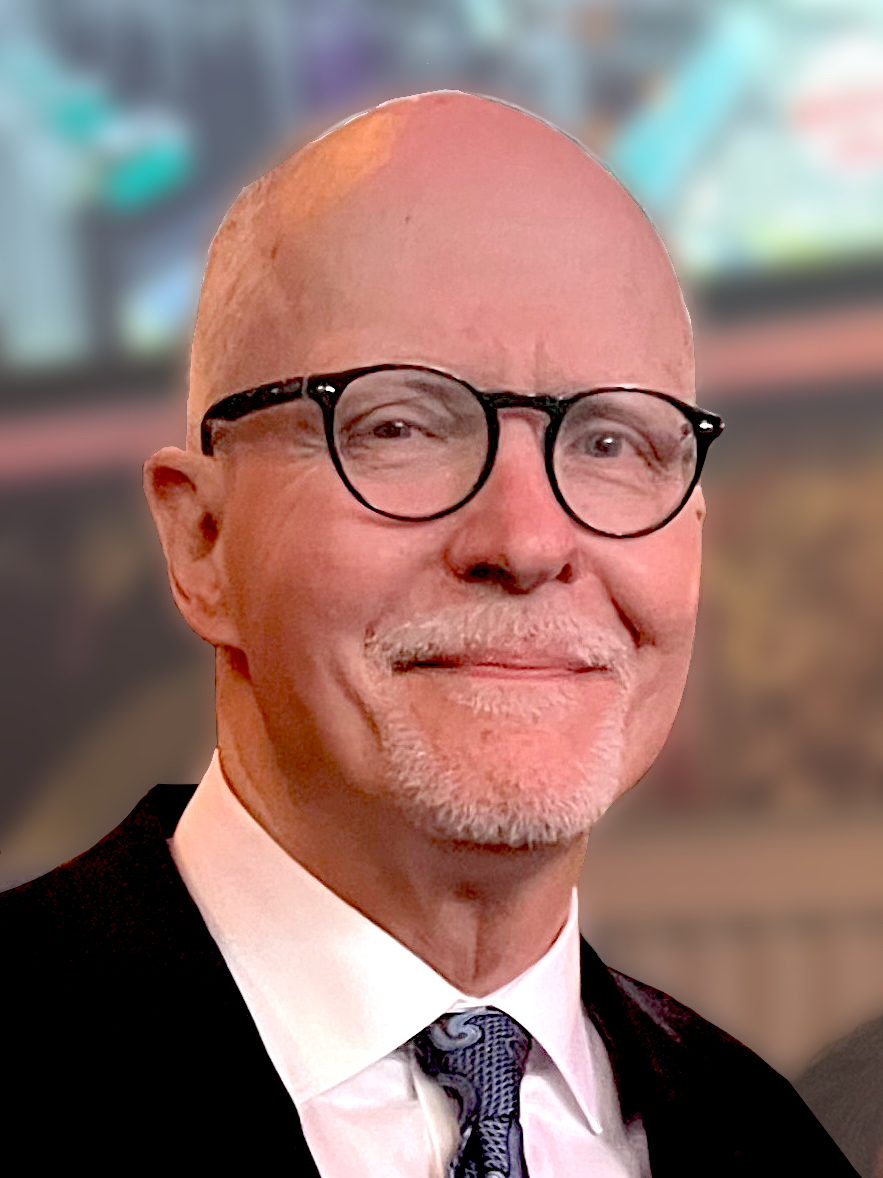

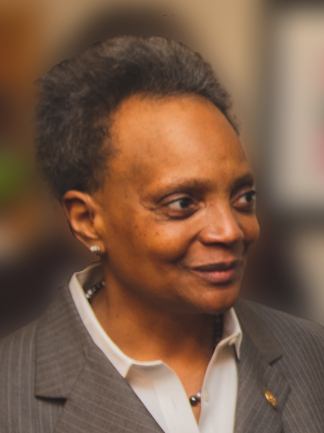

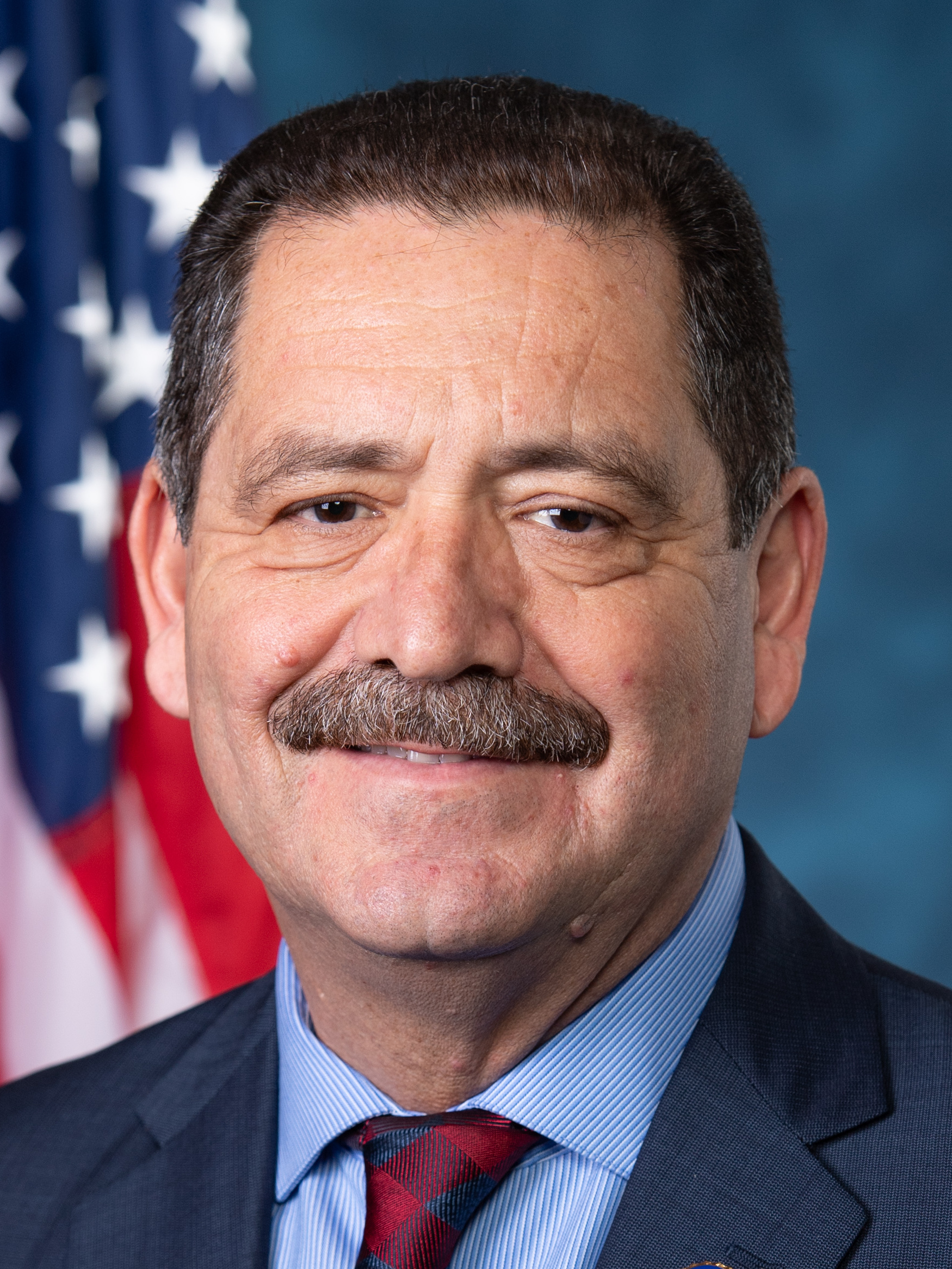

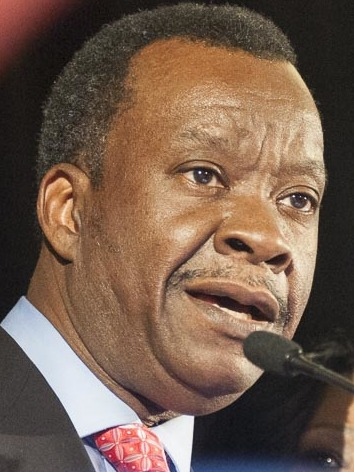
Candidate	Brandon Johnson	Paul Vallas	Lori Lightfoot
First round	122,093; 21.63%	185,743; 32.90%	94,890; 16.81%
Runoff	319,481; 52.16%	293,033; 47.84%	Eliminated
Candidate	Chuy García	Willie Wilson
First round	77,222; 13.68%	51,567; 9.13%
Runoff	Eliminated	Eliminated
Mayor before election
Lori Lightfoot
Democratic
Elected mayor
Brandon Johnson
Democratic

The 2023 Chicago mayoral election was held on February 28, 2023, to elect the mayor of Chicago, Illinois. With no candidate receiving a majority of votes in the initial round of the election, a runoff election was held on April 4. This two-round election took place alongside other 2023 Chicago elections, including races for City Council, city clerk, city treasurer, and police district councils. The election was officially nonpartisan, with winner Brandon Johnson (a member of the Cook County Board of Commissioners) being elected to a four-year term which began on May 15.

Incumbent Lori Lightfoot ran for a second term in office, but placed third in the first round. Former CEO of Chicago Public Schools Paul Vallas and Cook County Commissioner Brandon Johnson advanced to a runoff. Other candidates eliminated in the first round included U.S. Representative Chuy Garcia and businessman Willie Wilson. Johnson defeated Vallas in the runoff, in what was considered an upset. This was the first Chicago mayoral election since adopting nonpartisan two-round system elections in which the candidate who won the most votes in the first round did not win the runoff.

== Candidates ==
=== Advanced to the runoff ===
The following candidates advanced to the runoff election held on April 4
Candidate	Experience	Announced	Ref
Brandon Johnson	Cook County commissioner from the 1st district since 2018	October 27, 2022	
Paul Vallas	Chief Executive Officer of Chicago Public Schools (1995–2001); Candidate for mayor in 2019; Democratic nominee for lieutenant governor in 2014 Democratic candidate for governor in 2002	June 1, 2022	

=== Eliminated in the first round ===
The following candidates were eliminated in the first round and did not advance to the runoff election
Candidate	Experience	Announced	Ref
Kam Buckner	Illinois state representative since 2019	May 12, 2022 (endorsed Johnson)	
Chuy García	U.S. Representative from Illinois's 4th congressional district since 2019; Cook County commissioner from the 7th district (2011–2019); Illinois state senator from the 1st district (1993–1999); Candidate for mayor in 2015	November 10, 2022 (endorsed Johnson)	
Ja'Mal Green	Marketing executive Community activist Candidate for mayor in 2019	July 15, 2022 (Note: Archived November 28, 2022, at the Wayback Machine) (endorsed Vallas)	
Sophia King	Alderman from the 4th ward since 2016	August 10, 2022 (endorsed Vallas)	
Lori Lightfoot	Mayor of Chicago from 2019 to 2023	January 18, 2022 (Note: Archived January 17, 2019, at the Wayback Machine)	
Roderick Sawyer	Alderman from the 6th ward since 2011; Son of former mayor Eugene Sawyer	June 3, 2022 (endorsed Vallas)	
Willie Wilson	Medical supplies company founder Perennial candidate	April 11, 2022 (Note: Archived November 28, 2022, at the Wayback Machine) (endorsed Vallas)	

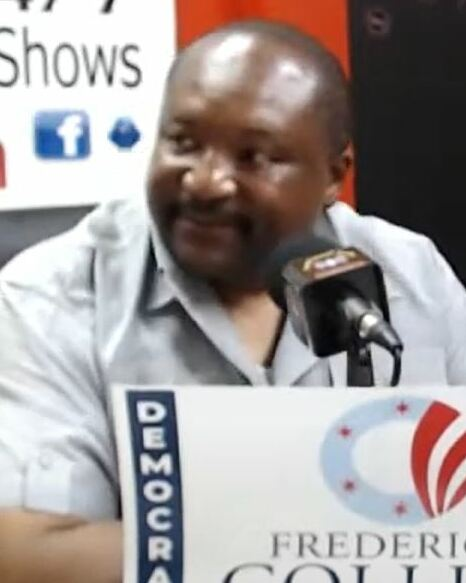
CPD officer Frederick Collins was one of two candidates removed from the ballot for having insufficient signatures.

=== Disqualified ===
- Frederick Collins, Chicago Police Department officer and candidate for mayor in 2015
- Johnny Logalbo, freelance counselor (ran a write-in campaign)

=== Withdrew ===
- John Catanzara, president of the Chicago Fraternal Order of Police (endorsed Vallas)
- Montelle Gaji
- Bradley Laborman, actor and realtor
- Raymond Lopez, alderman from the 15th ward since 2015 (ran for reelection, endorsed Wilson in first round and Vallas in runoff)

=== Declined ===
The following speculated potential candidates did not run:

- Bill Conway, portfolio manager, former assistant Cook County state's attorney, and candidate for Cook County state's attorney in 2020 (ran for city council)
- Stacy Davis Gates, president of the Chicago Teachers Union
- Arne Duncan, former U.S. secretary of education (2009–2016) and former chief executive officer of Chicago Public Schools (2001–2009) (endorsed Vallas)
- La Shawn Ford, Illinois state representative from the 8th district (2007–present) and candidate for mayor in 2019
- Janice Jackson, former chief executive officer of Chicago Public Schools
- Mike Quigley, U.S. representative from Illinois's 5th congressional district since 2009 (Note: Formed an exploratory committee, but did not run.) (endorsed García)
- Pat Quinn, former governor of Illinois (2009–2015) (Note: Collected signatures to appear on the ballot, but did not formally run) (endorsed García in the first round, then endorsed Vallas in the runoff)
- Jesse Sharkey, former president of the Chicago Teachers Union
- Tom Tunney, alderman from the 44th Ward (2003–2023) and vice-mayor (2019–2023) (endorsed Vallas)
- Anna Valencia, Chicago city clerk since 2017 and candidate for Illinois secretary of state in 2022 (ran for reelection)

== First round ==
=== First round campaign ===
February 2023 candidate forum at UIC

Lightfoot's administration faced criticism due to rising crime rates in Chicago and accusations of covering up police misconduct. During her term, she clashed with members of the Chicago City Council, the Chicago Teachers Union, and Illinois Governor J. B. Pritzker's administration. The New York Times remarked that she had an "uncanny ability to make political enemies." However, Lightfoot received praise for her efforts to build affordable housing, repair dilapidated areas of the city, and raise the minimum wage.

A wide field of nine challengers qualified for the ballot. Polling of the race was largely inconsistent but indicated that Lightfoot was in danger of losing re-election and that the candidates with the best chance of making a runoff were Lightfoot, U.S. Representative Chuy García, Cook County commissioner Brandon Johnson, former Chicago Public Schools CEO Paul Vallas, and businessman Willie Wilson. Polling also showed that Garcia enjoyed heavy support from Latino voters, while a plurality of white voters backed Vallas and a plurality of black voters backed Lightfoot. Vallas and Wilson were considered more moderate than Lightfoot, with García and Johnson being more progressive. However, many organizations in the coalition of labor unions and progressive groups that supported García in his 2015 mayoral campaign instead backed Johnson in 2023.

Lightfoot faced controversy when she emailed public school teachers offering school credit for students who interned on her campaign and when she told South Side residents to either vote for her or not vote at all, while Vallas faced accusations that he lived outside the city. Lightfoot ran ads tying García to Sam Bankman-Fried and Michael Madigan and accusing Johnson of wanting to reduce police budgets. She and García also ran ads accusing Vallas of being an anti-abortion Democrat in name only. García also questioned whether Johnson could be objective as mayor given his close relationship with the Chicago Teachers Union, while Johnson in turn accused García of "abandoning the progressive movement" by adopting a more moderate policy platform in his 2023 campaign.

Several days before the election, Fran Spielman of the Chicago Sun-Times opined that polls demonstrated Paul Vallas to be the top front-runner, being likely to place either first or second in the initial round of voting and advance to a runoff, with Garcia, Johnson, and Lightfoot in contention for the second runoff spot.

=== First round polling ===
Graph of select polls

Only showing polls by more-established polling sources: Bendixen & Amandi, GBAO, Impact Research, Lester & Associates, Mason–Dixon, Ogden & Fry, Public Policy Polling, and Victory Research

Graph of all polls

Pollster	Pollster's rating from 538	Poll sponsor	Date(s) administered	Sample size (Note: Key: A – all adults RV – registered voters LV – likely voters V – unclear)	Margin of error	Kam Buckner	Chuy García	Ja'Mal Green	Brandon Johnson	Sophia King	Lori Lightfoot	Raymond Lopez	Roderick Sawyer	Paul Vallas	Willie Wilson	Other	Undecided
Victory Research	B/C	—N/a	February 23–26, 2023	806 (LV)	± 3.45%	–	15.6%	–	20.2%	–	18.7%	–	–	26.8%	11.4%	–	–
1983 Labs	—N/a	—N/a	February 22–25, 2023	1,458 (RV)	± 2.57%	3.39%	15.85%	4.87%	14.49%	5.76%	17.97%	–	0.58%	23.91%	11.88%	1.30%	–
M3 Strategies	—N/a	—N/a	February 20–21, 2023	416 (LV)	± 4.6%	–	11.6%	–	18.0%	–	13.6%	–	–	32.0%	–	–	14%
Victory Research	B/C	—N/a	February 12–15, 2023	806 (LV)	± 3.45%	0.7%	13.8%	0.7%	16.1%	3.6%	17.1%	–	0.7%	22.8%	11.8%	–	12.5%
1983 Labs	—N/a	—N/a	February 9–13, 2023	988 (LV)	± 3.12%	4.52%	9.93%	6.95%	7.42%	5.03%	14.83%	–	1.43%	13.28%	12.12%	–	21.93%
BSP Research	—N/a	Center for the Study of Diversity and Democracy at Northwestern University, Hispanic Federation, Illinois Black Advocacy Initiative, Latino Policy Forum, Latino Victory Project	February 5–10, 2023	643 (RV)	± 3.9%	4%	17%	6%	9%	5%	14%	–	3%	19%	12%	–	20%
M3 Strategies	—N/a	—N/a	February 6–8, 2023	722 (LV)	± 3.65%	–	13.2%	–	16.5%	–	16.6%	–	–	31%	–	–	11%
GBAO	B/C	Lori Lightfoot campaign	February 5–7, 2023	501 (LV)	± 4.4%	–	13%	–	15%	–	24%	–	–	20%	14%	–	7%
Mason–Dixon	B/C	Telemundo Chicago (WSNS), NBC 5 (WMAQ-TV), Chicago Sun-Times and WBEZ	January 31 – February 3, 2023	625 (RV)	± 4%	1%	20%	2%	11%	1%	17%	–	0%	18%	12%	–	18%
Lake Research Partners	A/B	Brandon Johnson campaign	January 30 – February 2, 2023	600 (LV)	± 4%	1%	11%	–	15%	2%	16%	–	–	24%	10%	–	16%
IZQ Strategies (D)	—N/a	—N/a	January 27–February 2, 2023	1,040 (LV)	± 3%	5%	12%	2%	15%	2%	12%	–	1%	25%	11%	–	16%
Cor Strategies (R)	—N/a	—N/a	January 26–30, 2023	614 (LV)	± 3.95%	1%	13%	3%	7%	3%	23%	–	1%	21%	8%	–	20%
1983 Labs	—N/a	—N/a	January 23–27, 2023	554	± 4.25%	6.07%	7.46%	5.97%	9.36%	6.17%	16.28%	–	1.34%	10.23%	13.86%	1.35%	21.92%
Victory Research	B/C	Illinois Poll	January 23–25, 2023	806 (LV)	± 3.45%	0.7%	16.6%	0.9%	15.5%	3.1%	19.2%	–	0.6%	19.5%	11.7%	–	12.2%
1983 Labs	—N/a	—N/a	January 20–24, 2023	554	± 4.25%	7.65%	6.66%	6.85%	9.96%	5.61%	17.11%	–	1.57%	10.74%	14.77%	1.49%	17.59%
GBAO	B/C	Lori Lightfoot campaign	January 18–22, 2023	800 (LV)	± 3.5%	2%	18%	–	9%	2%	25%	–	–	22%	11%	2%	10%
M3 Strategies	—N/a	—N/a	January 15–17, 2023	531 (LV)	± 4.25%	2.3%	19.0%	1.3%	12.2%	0.8%	9.8%	–	0.2%	26.0%	8.5%	–	20.0%
Lester & Associates (D)	B/C	Sophia King campaign	January 9–14, 2023	600 (LV)	± 4.9%	5%	21%	5%	8%	8%	15%	–	–	10%	5%	–	27%
GBAO	B/C	—N/a	December 15–20, 2022	800 (LV)	± 3.5%	3%	35%	–	4%	2%	24%	–	–	14%	8%	2%	10%
Impact Research (D)	B/C (Note: Impact Research was formerly known as "ALG Research", under which name FiveThirtyEight lists them as having a grade of B/C)	—N/a	December 10–15, 2022	1,000 (LV)	± 3.1%	–	28%	–	–	–	21%	–	–	12%	13%	26% (Note: No other candidate received more than 10% of the vote, and no undecided number was given.)	
Polco	—N/a	Crain's Chicago Business and The Daily Line	November 29 – December 14, 2022	1,757 (A) (Note: Most, though not all, respondents were likely voters)	± 3%	5%	25%	3%	25%	3%	11%	–	2%	15%	3%	1%	7%
M3 Strategies	—N/a	—N/a	December 11–13, 2022	440 (LV)	± 4.65%	1.4%	27.6%	–	3.2%	1.8%	14.5%	–	–	19.1%	13.1%	–	19.1%
Impact Research (D)	B/C	International Union of Operating Engineers Local 150 (Note: International Union of Operating Engineers Local 150 had already endorsed García)	November 10–17, 2022	700 (LV)	± 3.7%	–	25%	–	–	–	18%	*	–	14%	10%	29% (Note: The remaining 29% was split among other unspecified candidates, including Raymond Lopez and Pat Quinn, with none receiving more than 10%)	14%
Public Policy Polling (D)	A–	Chuy Garcia campaign	October 26–27, 2022	616 (LV)	± 4.0%	–	14%	–	3%	3%	22%	7%	–	8%	12%	4% (Note: Tom Tunney 4%)	25%
Bendixen & Amandi	B/C	Nuestro PAC (Note: Nuestro PAC was attempting to persuade Chuy García to run for mayor)	September 1–5, 2022	400 (LV)	± 4.9%	*	24%	*	*	*	25%	*	*	9%	13%	23% (Note: Pat Quinn 6%; Kam Buckner, Ja'Mal Green, Brandon Johnson, Sophia King, Raymond Lopez, and Roderick Sawyer all received "between 0% and 4%," with an unknown amount undecided.)	
Ogden & Fry (R)	B/C	—N/a	November 13, 2021	457 (LV)	± 4.5%	–	–	–	–	–	20%	8%	–	–	–	17% (Note: Arne Duncan with 9%; Cantanzara with 8%)	39%

Note: FiveThirtyEight rates pollsters with letter grades ranging from A+ to F, with A+ being the highest rating and F being the lowest (see more)

==== Aggregates of first round polls ====
Aggregator	Kam Buckner	Chuy García	Ja'Mal Green	Brandon Johnson	Sophia King	Lori Lightfoot	Roderick Sawyer	Paul Vallas	Willie Wilson	Other	Undecided
Ballotpedia	3%	14%	3%	11%	3%	15%	1%	19%	12%	18%	
CrowdWisdom360	—N/a	13.8%	—N/a	16.2%	—N/a	16.2%	—N/a	26.2%	11.8%	—N/a	—N/a
Frank Calabrese	2.3%	16.8%	2.5%	11.6%	2.6%	17.5%	0.7%	21.6%	10.4%	—N/a	—N/a

=== First round endorsements ===
Kam Buckner

State representatives

- Margaret Croke, 12th district (2021–present)
- Jehan Gordon-Booth, 92nd district (2009–present)
- LaToya Greenwood, 114th district (2017–2023)
- Natalie Manley, 98th district (2013–present)
- Denyse Wang Stoneback, 16th district (2021–2023)

Editorial boards

- Columbia Chronicle editorial board
Chuy García

State elected officials

- Pat Quinn, former governor of Illinois (2009–2015)

U.S. representatives

- Luis Gutiérrez, IL-04 (1993–2019)
- Mike Quigley, IL-05 (2009–present)
- Jan Schakowsky, IL-09 (1999–present)

State senators

- Cristina Castro, district 22 (2017–present)
- Celina Villanueva, district 11 (2020–present)
- Ram Villivalam, district 8 (2019–present)

State representatives

- Robyn Gabel, House majority leader (2023–present) from district 18 (2010–present)
- Edgar Gonzalez Jr., district 23 (2020–present)
- Norma Hernandez, district 77 (2023–present)
- Theresa Mah, district 2 (2017–present)
- Aaron Ortiz, district 1 (2019–present)

County officials

- Alma Anaya, Cook County commissioner from District 7 (2018–present)
- Bridget Gainer, Cook County commissioner from District 10 (2009–present)
- David Orr, former Cook County clerk (1990–2018) and former acting mayor of Chicago (1987)

Chicago aldermen

- Felix Cardona Jr., 31st ward (2019–present)
- Edwin Eisendrath, former 43rd ward (1987–1993)
- Michael Rodriguez, 22nd ward (2019–present)
- Susan Sadlowski Garza, 10th ward (2015–present)
- Andre Vasquez, 40th ward (2019–present)
- Gilbert Villegas, 36th ward (2015–present)

Individuals

- Dolores Huerta, co-founder of United Farm Workers

Labor unions

- BLET Divisions 294, 575 and 815/GCA620
- Brotherhood of Maintenance of Way Employes
- Brotherhood of Railroad Signalmen
- Gasworkers Local 18007 (UWUA)
- IAM District Lodge 19
- International Brotherhood of Teamsters Local 727 and 727
- International Union of Operating Engineers Local 150
- TCU District 19, Local 126, Local 8, Local 701
- United Farm Workers
- Utility Workers Union of America Local 18007

Organizations

- 39th Ward Democratic Organization
- Latino Victory Fund
Ja'Mal Green

State legislators

- Nina Turner, former Ohio state senator (2008–2014) and president of Our Revolution

Individuals

- Mike Epps, actor and comedian
- Susan Sarandon, actress and activist
Brandon Johnson

U.S. representatives

- Jonathan Jackson, IL-01 (2023–present)
- Delia Ramirez, IL-03 (2023–present)

State senators

- Omar Aquino, district 2 (2016–present)
- Cristina Pacione-Zayas, district 20 (2020–present)
- Robert Peters, district 13 (2018–present)

State representatives

- Lakesia Collins, district 9 (2019–present)
- Mary Flowers, district 31 (1985–present)
- Will Guzzardi, district 39 (2015–present)
- Lilian Jiménez, district 4 (2023–present)

Cook County commissioners

- Monica Gordon, district 5 (2022–present)
- Bill Lowry, district 3 (2018–present)
- Stanley Moore, district 4 (2018–present)
- Josina Morita, district 13 (2022–present)
- Anthony Quezada, district 8 (2022–present)

Chicago aldermen

- Pat Dowell, 3rd ward (2007–present)
- Maria Hadden, 49th ward (2019-present)
- Daniel La Spata, 1st ward (2019–present)
- Matt Martin, 47th ward (2019–present)
- Carlos Ramirez-Rosa, 35th ward (2015–present)
- Rossana Rodriguez-Sanchez, 33rd ward (2019–present)
- Byron Sigcho-Lopez, 25th ward (2019–present)
- Jeanette Taylor, 20th ward (2019–present)

Individuals

- Barbara Ransby, University of Illinois Chicago professor

Labor unions

- AFSCME Council 31
- AFT, IFT, CTU (AFT Local 1), Cook County College Teachers Union (AFT Local 1600), and Southwest Suburban Teachers Union (AFT 943)
- SEIU Healthcare Illinois
- Service Employees International Union Local 73

Organizations

- 38th Ward Democrats
- Independent Voters of Illinois-Independent Precinct Organization, 11th Ward IPO, and 25th Ward IPO
- Jewish Council on Urban Affairs Votes
- United Working Families and 33rd Ward Working Families
- Working Families Party
Sophia King

Chicago aldermen

- David Moore, 17th ward (2015–present)

Individuals

- Robin Robinson, news anchor
Lori Lightfoot

U.S. senators

- Tammy Duckworth, Illinois (2017–present)

State elected officials

- Jesse White, former Illinois secretary of state (1999–2023)

U.S. representatives

- Danny Davis, IL-07 (1997–present)
- Robin Kelly, IL-02 (2013–present)
- Marie Newman, IL-03 (2021–2023)
- Bobby Rush, IL-01 (1993–2023)
- Bennie Thompson, MS-2 (1993–present)

State senators

- Sara Feigenholtz, district 6 (2020–present)
- Toi Hutchinson, district 40 (2009–2019)
- Willie Preston, district 16 (2023–present)
- Carol Ronen, former state senator (2000–2008) and state representative (1993–2000)
- Heather Steans, district 7 (2008–2021)

State representatives

- Kelly Cassidy, district 14 (2011–present)
- Camille Lilly, district 78 (2010–present)

County officials

- George Cardenas, Cook County Board of Review member from the 1st district (2022–present) and former Chicago alderman from the 12th ward (2003–2022)
- Barbara McGowan, Metropolitan Water Reclamation District of Greater Chicago commissioner
- Donna Miller, Cook County commissioner from the 6th district (2018–present)

Chicago aldermen

- Walter Burnett, 27th ward (1995–present)
- James Cappleman, 46th ward (2011–present)
- Melissa Conyears Ervin, Chicago city treasurer (2019–present)
- ~~Derrick Curtis, 18th ward (2015–present)~~ (endorsement withdrawn)
- Jason Ervin, 28th ward (2011–present)
- Michelle Harris, 8th ward (2006–present)
- Roberto Maldonado, 26th district (2009–present)
- Emma Mitts, 37th ward (2000–present)
- Dick Simpson, 44th ward (1971–1979)
- Chris Taliaferro, 29th ward (2015–present)
- Scott Waguespack, 32nd ward (2007–present)

Other local officials

- Annise Parker, former mayor of Houston, Texas (2010–2016)

Individuals

- Robert Clark, real estate executive

Labor unions

- American Postal Workers Union Local 1
- Chicago Entertainment Industry Labor Council
- International Alliance of Theatrical Stage Employees Local 2, 110, 476, 750, 762, 769
- International Association of Bridge, Structural, Ornamental and Reinforcing Iron Workers Chicago District Council
- International Union of Bricklayers and Allied Craftworkers Administrative District Council 1
- International Union of Operating Engineers Local 399
- Plumbers Union Local 130 (United Association)
- UNITE HERE Local 1
- UURWAW Local 11

Editorial boards/publishers

- N'Digo

Organizations

- EMILY's List
- Equality Illinois
- LGBTQ Victory Fund
- LPAC
Paul Vallas

Chicago aldermen

- Brian Hopkins, 2nd ward (2015–present)
- Anthony Napolitano, 41st ward (2015–present)
- Brendan Reilly, 42nd ward (2007–present) and former vice mayor (2015–2019)
- Tom Tunney, 44th ward (2003–present) and vice mayor (2019–present)

Editorial boards

- Chicago Tribune editorial board
- The Gazette editorial board

Labor unions

- Fraternal Order of Police Lodge #7
- International Union of Elevator Constructors Local 2
Willie Wilson

Local officials

- Raymond Lopez, Chicago alderman from the 15th ward since 2015 and former 2023 mayoral candidate

Organizations

- Polish American Congress Illinois division
Declined to endorse

State elected officials

- J. B. Pritzker, governor of Illinois (2019–present) (Democratic)

Chicago aldermen

- Timmy Knudsen, 43rd ward
- Nicholas Sposato, 38th ward

Editorial boards

- Chicago Sun-Times editorial board – ended practice of political endorsements
- Crain's Chicago Business editorial board – ended practice of political endorsements

Organizations

- 40th Ward Democrats
- Chicago Federation of Labor
- International Brotherhood of Electrical Workers Local 134

Endorsements by incumbent members of the U.S. House of Representatives from Illinois:
Endorsed Chuy Garcia (2)
Endorsed Brandon Johnson (2)
Endorsed Lori Lightfoot (2)

Endorsements by incumbent aldermen:

Endorsed Chuy Garcia (5)
Endorsed Brandon Johnson (8)
Endorsed Sophia King (1)
Endorsed Lori Lightfoot (9)
Endorsed Paul Vallas (4)
Endorsed Willie Wilson (1)
Incumbent alderman was a candidate (2)

Note: Map depicts wards as redrawn ahead of the 2023 election.

=== First round results ===
Turnout map of the first round by precinct

The Chicago Board of Elections claimed that early voting turnout in its 2023 municipal election was higher than early voting turnout in any previous Chicago municipal election. Vallas and Johnson advanced to the April runoff.

2023 Chicago mayoral election results (first round)
Candidate	Votes	%
Paul Vallas	185,743	32.90
Brandon Johnson	122,093	21.63
Lori Lightfoot (incumbent)	94,890	16.81
Chuy García	77,222	13.68
Willie Wilson	51,567	9.13
Ja'Mal Green	12,257	2.17
Kam Buckner	11,902	1.96
Sophia King	7,191	1.27
Roderick Sawyer	2,440	0.43
Write-in	29	0.00
Total votes	564,524	100.00

== Runoff ==
=== Runoff polling ===
Graph of select polls

Only showing polls by more-established polling sources: BSP Research, Emerson, Lake Research Partners, Mason–Dixon, Victory Research

Graph of all polls

Pollster	Pollster's rating from 538	Poll sponsor	Date(s) administered	Sample size	Margin of error	Brandon Johnson	Paul Vallas	Undecided
IZQ Strategies	—N/a	—N/a	April 1–3, 2023	632 (LV)	± 4%	**50%**	45%	6%
Victory Research	B/C		March 31–April 2, 2023	900 (LV)	± 3.27%	45.4%	**49.6%**	5%
Emerson	A−	WGN-TV, and The Hill	March 23–25, 2023	1,000 (LV)	± 3%	40.6%	**46.3%**	13%
BSP Research	B/C	Center for the Study of Diversity and Democracy at Northwestern University, Hispanic Federation, Illinois Black Advocacy Initiative, Latino Policy Forum, Latino Victory Project	March 15–23, 2023	1,500 (LV)	± 2.8%	**44%**	**44%**	12%
Victory Research	B/C	—N/a	March 20–23, 2023	806 (LV)	± 3.45%	44.2%	**46.3%**	10%
IZQ Strategies	—N/a	—N/a	March 15–16, 2023	680 (LV)	± 4%	**46%**	44%	10%
Victory Research	B/C	—N/a	March 6–9, 2023	806 (LV)	± 3.45%	39.1%	**44.9%**	16%
Lake Research Partners	A/B	Johnson campaign	March 2–7, 2023	800 (LV)	± 3.46%	**45%**	40%	14% (Note: An additional 1% support another candidate)
1983 Labs	—N/a	—N/a	March 2–6, 2023	583 (RV)	± 4.06%	32.47%	**43.52%**	24.01%
	—N/a	Vallas campaign	March 1–6, 2023	800 (LV)	± 3.5%	38%	**47%**	15%
1983 Labs	—N/a	—N/a	February 22–25, 2023	1,458 (RV)	± 2.57%	30.75%	**44.13%**	25.12%
Victory Research	B/C	—N/a	February 12–15, 2023	806 (LV)	± 3.45%	32.6%	**46.0%**	21.3%
Mason–Dixon	B/C	Telemundo Chicago (WSNS), NBC 5 (WMAQ-TV), Chicago Sun-Times and WBEZ	January 31 – February 3, 2023	625 (RV)	± 4%	**39%**	38%	

Note: FiveThirtyEight rates pollsters with letter grades ranging from A+ to F, with A+ being the highest rating and F being the lowest (see more)

==== Aggregates of runoff polls ====
Aggregator	Brandon Johnson	Paul Vallas
CrowdWisdom360	43.3%	**46.6%**

==== Hypothetical runoff scenario polls ====
Lori Lightfoot vs. Anthony Beale

Pollster	Pollster's rating from 538	Date(s) administered	Sample size	Margin of error	Anthony Beale	Lori Lightfoot	Undecided
Ogden & Fry (R)	B/C	November 13, 2021	457 (LV)	± 4.5%	**24.4%**	24.2%	–

Lori Lightfoot vs. John Catanzara

Pollster	Pollster's rating from 538	Date(s) administered	Sample size	Margin of error	John Catanzara	Lori Lightfoot	Undecided
Ogden & Fry (R)	B/C	November 13, 2021	457 (LV)	± 4.5%	24%	**46%**	30%

Lori Lightfoot vs. Arne Duncan

Pollster	Pollster's rating from 538	Date(s) administered	Sample size	Margin of error	Lori Lightfoot	Arne Duncan	Undecided
Ogden & Fry (R)	B/C	November 13, 2021	457 (LV)	± 4.5%	23%	**31%**	–

Lori Lightfoot vs. Chuy García

Graph of all polls

Pollster	Pollster's rating from 538	Poll sponsor	Date(s) administered	Sample size	Margin of error	Chuy García	Lori Lightfoot	Undecided
1983 Labs	—N/a	—N/a	February 22–25, 2023	1,458 (RV)	± 2.57%	**54.35%**	23.41%	22.24%
Victory Research	B/C	Illinois Poll	February 12–15, 2023	806 (LV)	± 3.45%	**38.6%**	33.9	27.5%
Mason–Dixon	Telemundo Chicago (WSNS), NBC 5 (WMAQ-TV), Chicago Sun-Times and WBEZ	B/C	January 31–February 3, 2023	625 (RV)	± 4%	**54%**	30%	
Cor Strategies (R)	—N/a	—N/a	January 26–30, 2023	614 (LV)	± 3.95%	35%	**42%**	24%
Impact Research (D)	B/C	International Union of Operating Engineers; Local 150	November 10–17, 2022	700 (LV)	± 3.7%	**55%**	25%	
Public Policy Polling (D)	A–	Chuy Garcia campaign	October 26–27, 2022	616 (LV)	± 4.0%	**43%**	34%	23%

Lori Lightfoot vs. Brandon Johnson

Pollster	Pollster's rating from 538	Poll sponsor	Date(s) administered	Sample size	Margin of error	Brandon Johnson	Lori Lightfoot	Undecided
Victory Research	B/C	Illinois Poll	February 12–15, 2023	806 (LV)	± 3.45%	**37.1%**	32.4	30.5%
Public Policy Polling (D)	A–	Chuy Garcia campaign	October 26–27, 2022	616 (LV)	± 4.0%	23%	**41%**	36%

Lori Lightfoot vs. Mike Quigley

Pollster	Pollster's rating from 538	Poll sponsor	Date(s) administered	Sample size	Margin of error	Lori Lightfoot	Mike Quigley	Undecided
Impact Research (D)	Mike Quigley campaign committee	B/C	March 21–27, 2022	600 (LV)	± 4.0%	35%	**45%**	20%

Lori Lightfoot vs. Pat Quinn

Pollster	Pollster's rating from 538	Poll Sponsor	Date(s) administered	Sample size	Margin of error	Lori Lightfoot	Pat Quinn	Undecided
Unspecified	—N/a	Pat Quinn				35%	**45%**	

Lori Lightfoot vs. Paul Vallas

Graph of all polls

Pollster	Pollster's rating from 538	Poll sponsor	Date(s) administered	Sample size	Margin of error	Lori Lightfoot	Paul Vallas	Undecided
1983 Labs	—N/a	—N/a	February 22–25, 2023	1,458 (RV)	± 2.57%	30.04%	**49.49%**	20.48%
Victory Research	B/C	Illinois Poll	February 12–15, 2023	806 (LV)	± 3.45%	30.1%	**49.3%**	20.6%
Mason–Dixon	B/C	Telemundo Chicago (WSNS), NBC 5 (WMAQ-TV), Chicago Sun-Times and WBEZ	January 31–February 3, 2023	625 (RV)	± 4%	35%	**48%**	
Cor Strategies (R)	—N/a	—N/a	January 26–30, 2023	614 (LV)	± 3.95%	40%	40%	20%
Public Policy Polling (D)	A–	Chuy Garcia campaign	October 26–27, 2022	616 (LV)	± 4.0%	**39%**	36%	25%
Ogden & Fry (R)	B/C	—N/a	November 13, 2021	457 (LV)	± 4.5%	24%	**28%**	–

Lori Lightfoot vs. Willie Wilson

Pollster	Pollster's rating from 538	Poll sponsor	Date(s) administered	Sample size	Margin of error	Lori Lightfoot	Willie Wilson	Undecided
Victory Research	B/C	Illinois Poll	February 12–15, 2023	806 (LV)	± 3.45%	36.6%	**39.6%**	23.8%
Public Policy Polling (D)	A–	Chuy Garcia campaign	October 26–27, 2022	616 (LV)	± 4.0%	**43%**	35%	22%

Chuy García vs. Brandon Johnson

Pollster	Pollster's rating from 538	Poll sponsor	Date(s) administered	Sample size	Margin of error	Chuy Garcia	Brandon Johnson	Undecided
Victory Research	B/C	Illinois Poll	February 12–15, 2023	806 (LV)	± 3.45%	**42.4%**	39.0%	18.6%

Chuy García vs. Paul Vallas

Graph of all polls

Pollster	Pollster's rating from 538	Poll sponsor	Date(s) administered	Sample size	Margin of error	Chuy Garcia	Paul Vallas	Undecided
1983 Labs	—N/a	—N/a	February 22–25, 2023	1,458 (RV)	± 2.57%	38.16	**42.76%**	19.07%
Victory Research	B/C	Illinois Poll	February 12–15, 2023	806 (LV)	± 3.45%	38.7%	**43.9%**	17.4%
Mason–Dixon	B/C	Telemundo Chicago (WSNS), NBC 5 (WMAQ-TV), Chicago Sun-Times and WBEZ	January 31–February 3, 2023	625 (RV)	± 4%	**47%**	26%	
Cor Strategies (R)	—N/a	—N/a	January 26–30, 2023	614 (LV)	± 3.95%	25%	**45%**	30%

Chuy García vs. Willie Wilson

Pollster	Pollster's rating from 538	Poll sponsor	Date(s) administered	Sample size	Margin of error	Chuy Garcia	Willie Wilson	Undecided
Victory Research	B/C	Illinois Poll	February 12–15, 2023	806 (LV)	± 3.45%	**39.6%**	29.3%	31.1%

Brandon Johnson vs. Willie Wilson

Pollster	Pollster's rating from 538	Poll sponsor	Date(s) administered	Sample size	Margin of error	Brandon Johnson	Willie Wilson	Undecided
Victory Research	B/C	Illinois Poll	February 12–15, 2023	806 (LV)	± 3.45%	**35.4%**	28.7%	36.0%

Paul Vallas vs. Willie Wilson

Pollster	Pollster's rating from 538	Poll sponsor	Date(s) administered	Sample size	Margin of error	Paul Vallas	Willie Wilson	Undecided
Victory Research	B/C	Illinois Poll	February 12–15, 2023	806 (LV)	± 3.45%	**49.9%**	36.5%	13.6%
Mason–Dixon	B/C	Telemundo Chicago (WSNS), NBC 5 (WMAQ-TV), Chicago Sun-Times and WBEZ	January 31 – February 3, 2023	625 (RV)	± 4%	**43%**	36%	

=== Runoff endorsements ===
Endorsements in bold were made after the first round.

Brandon Johnson

U.S. senators

- **Carol Moseley Braun**, Illinois (1993–1999)
- **Jesse Jackson**, civil rights leader and former shadow senator from Washington, D.C. (1991–1997)
- **Bernie Sanders**, Vermont (2007–present)
- **Elizabeth Warren**, Massachusetts (2013–present)

U.S. representatives

- **Jamaal Bowman**, NY-16 (2021–2025)
- **Brendan Boyle**, PA-02 (2015–present)
- **Troy Carter**, LA-02 (2021–present)
- **Jim Clyburn**, SC-6 (1993–present)
- **Danny Davis**, IL-07 (1997–present) (endorsed Lightfoot in the first round)
- **Chuy García**, IL-04 (2019–present) and former 2023 mayoral candidate
- Jonathan Jackson, IL-01 (2023–present)
- **Marie Newman**, IL-03 (2021–2023) (endorsed Lightfoot in the first round)
- **Ayanna Pressley**, MA-07 (2019–present)
- Delia Ramirez, IL-03 (2023–present)
- **Jan Schakowsky**, IL-09 (1999–present) (endorsed García in the first round)

State elected officials

- **Kwame Raoul**, Illinois attorney general (2019–present)

State appointed officials

- **Jim Bennett**, director of the Illinois Department of Human Rights (2019–present)

State senators

- Omar Aquino, district 2 (2016–present)
- **Jacqueline Collins**, district 16 (2003–2023)
- **Mattie Hunter**, district 3 (2003–present)
- **Kimberly Lightford**, Illinois Senate majority leader (2019–present) from district 4 (1998–present)
- **Robert Martwick**, district 10 (2019–present)
- Cristina Pacione-Zayas, district 20 (2020–present)
- Robert Peters, district 13 (2018–present)
- **Mike Simmons**, district 7 (2021–present)
- **Elgie Sims**, district 17 (2018–present)
- **Donne Trotter**, district 16 (1993–2003) and district 17 (2003–2018)
- **Celina Villanueva**, district 11 (2020–present) (endorsed García in the first round)
- **Ram Villivalam**, district 8 (2019–present) (endorsed García in the first round)

State representatives

- **Kam Buckner**, district 26 (2019–present) and 2023 mayoral candidate
- **Kelly Cassidy**, district 14 (2011–present) (endorsed Lightfoot in the first round)
- Lakesia Collins, district 9 (2019–present)
- Mary Flowers, district 31 (1985–present)
- **Edgar Gonzalez Jr.**, district 23 (2020–present) (endorsed García in the first round)
- Will Guzzardi, district 39 (2015–present)
- **Greg Harris**, majority leader of the Illinois House of Representatives (2019–2023) from district 13 (2006–2023)
- **Hoan Huynh**, district 13 (2023–present)
- Lilian Jiménez, district 4 (2023–present)
- **Theresa Mah**, district 2 (2017–present) (endorsed García in the first round)
- **Bob Morgan**, district 58 (2019–present)
- **Kevin Olickal**, district 16 (2023–present)
- **Justin Slaughter**, district 27 (2017–present)
- **Monica Faith Stewart**, district 36 (1981–1983)

Cook County commissioners

- **Dennis Deer**, district 2
- Monica Gordon, district 5 (2022–present)
- Bill Lowry, district 3 (2018–present)
- Stanley Moore, district 4 (2018–present)
- Josina Morita, district 13 (2022–present)
- **Kevin Morrison**, district 15 (2018–present)
- **Toni Preckwinkle**, president of the Cook County commission (2010–present)
- Anthony Quezada, district 8 (2022–present)

Other county officials

- **David Orr**, former Cook County clerk (1990–2018) and former acting mayor of Chicago (1987) (endorsed García in the first round)
- **Dan Pogorzelski**, Metropolitan Water Reclamation District of Greater Chicago commissioner (2022–present)
- **Samantha Steele**, Cook County Board of Review member from the 2nd district (2022–present)

Chicago aldermen

- **Howard Brookins**, 21st ward (2003–present, outgoing)
- Pat Dowell, 3rd ward (2007–present)
- **Jason Ervin**, 28th ward (2011–present) (endorsed Lightfoot in the first round)
- **Jessie Fuentes**, alderman-elect from the 26th ward (2023–present)
- Maria Hadden, 49th ward (2019–present)
- Daniel La Spata, 1st ward (2019–present)
- Matt Martin, 47th ward (2019–present)
- **Julia Ramirez**, alderman-elect from the 12th ward (2023–present)
- Carlos Ramirez-Rosa, 35th ward (2015–present)
- **Michael Rodriguez**, 22nd ward (2019–present) (endorsed Garcia in the first round)
- Rossana Rodriguez-Sanchez, 33rd ward (2019–present)
- **Helen Shiller**, 46th ward (1987–2011)
- Byron Sigcho-Lopez, 25th ward (2019–present)
- **Chris Taliaferro**, 29th ward (2005–present) (endorsed Lightfoot in the first round)
- Jeanette Taylor, 20th ward (2019–present)
- **Andre Vasquez**, 40th ward (2019–present) (endorsed García in the first round)

Other local officials

- **36 police district council members**
- **Daniel Biss**, mayor of Evanston (2021–present) and former Illinois state senator from district 9 (2013–2019)
- **Kendra Brooks**, Philadelphia city councilor (2020–present) (Working Families Party)
- **Melissa Conyears-Ervin**, Chicago city treasurer (2019–present) (endorsed Lightfoot in the first round)
- **Michael Hancock**, mayor of Denver, Colorado (2011–present)
- **Phillip Jones**, mayor of Newport News, Virginia (2023–present)
- **Brad Lander**, New York City comptroller
- **Greg Mathis**, former Detroit-area district court judge (1995–1998)
- **Frank Scott Jr.**, mayor of Little Rock, Arkansas (2019–present)

Individuals

- **Cathy Cohen**, University of Chicago professor
- **Kina Collins**, community organizer, perennial congressional candidate
- **Common**, rapper and actor
- **Jacqueline Jackson**, author and wife of Jesse Jackson
- **Martin Luther King III**, human rights activist and former president of the Southern Christian Leadership Conference (1997–2004)
- **Howie Klein**, former president of Reprise Records (1989–2001) and adjunct professor at McGill University
- **Vic Mensa**, rapper and singer
- **Mary Morten**, former president of NOW Chicago and former chair of Chicago Abortion Fund
- **Heather Digby Parton**, political blogger
- Barbara Ransby, University of Illinois Chicago professor
- **Cecile Richards**, former president of Planned Parenthood (2006–2018)
- **Beth Richie**, University of Illinois Chicago professor
- **Katherine Shindle**, actress and former Miss America
- **G. Flint Taylor**, human rights and civil rights attorney
- **Tasha Viets-VanLear**, musician
- **The Wachowskis**, film directors, best known for The Matrix
- **Randi Weingarten**, president of the American Federation of Teachers and attorney
- **Members of the band Wilco**
- **Marianne Williamson**, author, 2020 and 2024 US presidential candidate

Labor unions

- **Actors' Equity Association**
- **AFGE Local 704**
- AFSCME Council 31
- AFT, IFT, CTU (AFT Local 1), Cook County College Teachers Union (AFT Local 1600), Southwest Suburban Teachers Union (AFT 943), **AFT Local 6456**, and **AFT Local 6602**
- **International Brotherhood of Teamsters Local 743**
- **National Association of Letter Carriers Local Branch #11**
- **NNU, CNA/NNOC and Illinois Nurses Association**
- SEIU Healthcare Illinois
- SEIU Local 73 and **Local 1**
- **UE Western Region Locals 1118 and 1177**

Organizations

- 38th Ward Democrats
- **40th Ward Democrats**
- **47th Ward Democrats**
- **49th Ward Democrats**
- **Chicago National Organization for Women PAC**
- **Equality Illinois** (endorsed Lightfoot in the first round)
- Independent Voters of Illinois-Independent Precinct Organization, 11th Ward IPO, **15th Ward IPO**, and 25th Ward IPO
- **Indivisible Chicago Alliance**
- Jewish Council on Urban Affairs Votes
- **MoveOn**
- **National Association of Social Workers Illinois**
- **Northside Democracy for America**
- **Our Revolution**
- **People for the American Way**
- **People's Action**
- **Personal PAC**
- **Sierra Club Illinois Chapter**
- **Starbucks Workers United Illinois**
- United Working Families and 33rd Ward Working Families
- Working Families Party
Paul Vallas

U.S. cabinet officials

- **Arne Duncan**, former U.S. secretary of education (2009–2016) and former CEO of Chicago Public Schools (2001–2009)

U.S. senators

- **Dick Durbin**, Illinois (1997–present) and Senate majority whip (2007–2015, 2021–present)

U.S. representatives

- **Bobby Rush**, IL-1 (1993–2023) (endorsed Lightfoot in the first round)

State elected officials

- **Pat Quinn**, former governor of Illinois (2009–2015) (endorsed García in the first round)
- **Jesse White**, former Illinois secretary of state (1999–2023) (endorsed Lightfoot in the first round)

State appointed officials

- **Gery Chico**, former chair of the Illinois State Board of Education (2011–2015)

State senators

- **Emil Jones**, former Senate president (2003–2009) from district 14 (1983–2009)
- **Antonio Munoz**, district 1 (1999–2022)

State representatives

- **John D'Amico**, district 15 (2004–2021)
- **Angelica Guerrero-Cuellar**, district 22 (2021–present)

County officials

- **George Cardenas**, Cook County Board of Review member from the 1st district (2022–present) and former Chicago alderman from the 12th ward (2003–2022) (endorsed Lightfoot in the first round)
- **Iris Martinez**, clerk of the Cook County Circuit Court (2020–present)

Chicago aldermen

- **Anthony Beale**, 9th ward (2006–present)
- **Walter Burnett**, 27th ward (1995–present) (endorsed Lightfoot in the first round)
- **Felix Cardona Jr.**, 31st ward (2019–present)
- **Derrick Curtis**, 18th ward (2015–present) (endorsed Lightfoot in the first round, which was later withdrawn)
- **Michelle Harris**, 8th ward (2006–present) (endorsed Lightfoot in the first round)
- Brian Hopkins, 2nd ward (2015–present)
- **Sophia King**, 4th ward (2016–present, outgoing) and 2023 mayoral candidate
- **Bennett Lawson**, alderman-elect from the 44th ward (2023–present)
- **Nicole Lee**, 11th ward (2022–present)
- **Raymond Lopez**, 15th ward (2015–present) (endorsed Wilson in the first round)
- **Roberto Maldonado**, 26th ward (2009–present, outgoing) (endorsed Lightfoot in the first round)
- **Emma Mitts**, 37th ward (2000–present) (endorsed Lightfoot in the first round)
- **David Moore**, 17th ward (2015–present) (endorsed King in the first round)
- Anthony Napolitano, 41st ward (2015–present)
- **Samantha Nugent**, 39th ward (2019–present)
- **Matthew O'Shea**, 19th ward (2011–present)
- **Ariel Reboyras**, 30th ward (2003–present, outgoing)
- Brendan Reilly, 42nd ward (2007–present) and former vice mayor (2015–2019)
- **Roderick Sawyer**, 6th ward (2011–present, outgoing) and 2023 mayoral candidate
- **Debra Silverstein**, 50th ward (2011–present)
- **Nicholas Sposato**, 38th ward (2015–present)
- **Silvana Tabares**, 23rd ward (2018–present)
- Tom Tunney, 44th ward (2003–present, outgoing) and vice mayor (2019–present)

Individuals

- **Ja'Mal Green**, progressive community activist and 2023 mayoral candidate
- **Kenneth C. Griffin**, conservative hedge fund manager
- **Ozzie Guillen**, former Chicago White Sox player and manager
- **Charlie Kirk**, conservative activist and executive director of Turning Point USA (Republican)
- **Deborah Lynch**, former president of the CTU (2001–2004) and Chicago State University professor
- **Willie Wilson**, businessman and 2023 mayoral candidate

Editorial boards

- Chicago Tribune editorial board
- The Gazette editorial board

Labor unions

- **Black Contractors United**
- **Chicago IAFF Local 2**
- **Chicago Transit Authority's ATU**
- FOP Lodge #7
- **Gasworkers Local 18007 (UWUA)** (endorsed García in the first round)
- **International Association of Bridge, Structural, Ornamental and Reinforcing Iron Workers Chicago District Council** (endorsed Lightfoot in the first round)
- **IBEW Locals 9 and 134**
- **International Brotherhood of Teamsters JC25**
- International Union of Elevator Constructors Local 2
- **International Union of Operating Engineers Locals 150** (endorsed García in the first round) **and 399**
- **LIUNA Chicago District Council**
- **Plumbers Local 130 (United Association)** (endorsed Lightfoot in the first round)

Organizations

- **27th Ward Democrats**
- **Armenian National Committee of America**
- **Chicagoland Apartment Association**
- **Chicagoland Chamber of Commerce**
- **Cook County Democratic Women PAC**
- **Copernicus Foundation**
- **Illinois Hispanic Chamber of Commerce**
- **Illinois Hotel and Lodging Association**
- **Illinois Manufacturers' Association**
- **Illinois Retail Merchants Association**
- **LGBT Chamber of Commerce of Illinois**
- **Polish American Congress Illinois division** (endorsed Wilson in the first round)
- **Polish National Alliance**
- **Polish Roman Catholic Union of America**
Declined to endorse

Federal officials

- Bill Clinton, former president of the United States (1993–2001)

State elected officials

- J. B. Pritzker, governor of Illinois (2019–present)

Chicago aldermen

- Gilbert Villegas, 36th ward (2015–present) (endorsed García in the first round)

Individuals

- Al Sharpton, civil rights activist

Editorial boards

- Chicago Sun-Times editorial board – ended practice of political endorsements
- Crain's Chicago Business editorial board – ended practice of political endorsements

Endorsements by incumbent members of the U.S. House of Representatives from Illinois:
Endorsed Brandon Johnson (5)
Endorsed Paul Vallas (0)

Endorsements by incumbent aldermen:

Endorsed Brandon Johnson (14)
Endorsed Paul Vallas (22)

Note: Map depicts wards as redrawn ahead of the 2023 election.

Endorsements by Democratic Party ward organizations:

Endorsed Brandon Johnson (4)
Endorsed Paul Vallas (1)

Note: Map depicts wards as redrawn ahead of the 2023 election.

=== Runoff results ===
Turnout map of the runoff by precinct

2023 Chicago mayoral election results (runoff)
Candidate	Votes	%
Brandon Johnson	**319,481**	**52.16**
Paul Vallas	293,033	47.84
Total votes	**612,514**	**100.00**

== See also ==
- Mayoral elections in Chicago
