= Willie Wilson (businessman) =

American businessman (born 1948)

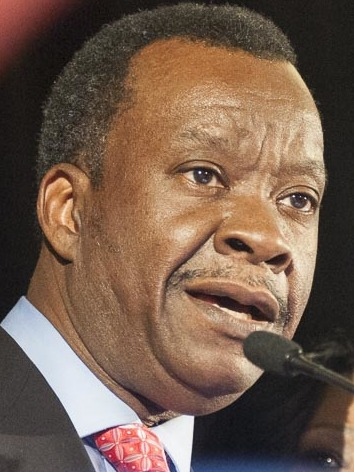
- Wilson in 2015

Personal details
- Born: June 16, 1948 (age 78) Gilbert, Louisiana, U.S.
- Party: Democratic (before 2020); Willie Wilson Party (2020–present)
- Website: Campaign website

Willie Wilson (born June 16, 1948) is an American businessman and perennial political candidate from Chicago who is currently running for mayor in the 2027 election. He unsuccessfully ran for the same office in the 2015, 2019, and 2023. He also ran for President of the United States in the 2016 United States presidential election, and for the United States Senate in 2020.

Wilson has owned and operated several different McDonald's restaurant franchises and owns Omar Medical Supplies, which imports and distributes latex gloves and other medical and safety supplies and equipment. He also produces the nationally syndicated gospel music television program Singsation, which won a Chicago/Midwest Emmy Award in 2012.

== Early life and education ==
Wilson was born the son of a sharecropper in Louisiana.

Wilson completed a seventh grade education before dropping out of primary school.

Wilson later received an honorary Doctor of Divinity degree from Mt. Carmel Theological Seminary and an honorary Doctor of Humane Letters from Chicago Baptist Institute International.

Wilson left home at age thirteen, and began his working life earning twenty cents per hour working in cotton and sugar cane fields.

Wilson lived for periods of time in Miami and New York City, before settling in Chicago in 1965.

Wilson worked various jobs once he moved to Chicago, before being hired to mop floors and flip burgers at a McDonald's. He worked his way up, being eventually promoted to manager, and later receiving a loan to become a McDonald's franchisee, thus starting his business career.

== Business career ==
In his career as a businessman, Wilson owned five McDonald's franchises (which he subsequently sold) and started a medical-supply company. He also produced the nationally syndicated gospel music television program Singsation

He has served as the founder and Chairman of the Board of Omar Medical Supplies, Inc.

Wilson served on the Board of Chicago Baptist Institute.

== Political career ==
Wilson served as the Chairman of the Governor's Task Force on Fair Practices in Contracting. In 2014, Illinois Governor-elect Bruce Rauner appointed Wilson to his transition team. Wilson has contended in 5 elections in the United States.

=== 2015 Chicago mayoral campaign ===
Map showing Wilson's 2015 vote share, by ward, darker shades indicate higher vote percentages

Wilson ran for Mayor of Chicago in 2015, being one of several challengers to incumbent mayor Rahm Emanuel.

Wilson collected 43,000 signatures for his candidature petition within five days. Emanuel issued a challenge to the validity of signatures collected. Emanuel ultimately dropped his challenge to Wilson's petition.

Wilson staked out a number of positions, including advocating for bringing a casino to Chicago and restoring Meigs Field (on Northerly Island) as an airport. Wilson was critical of Police Superintendent Garry McCarthy, and pledged to fire him if elected mayor. Wilson was also critical of Chicago Public Schools school closures which had taken place under Emanuel.

Wilson placed third in a five-candidate race with 50,960 votes, equal 10.66% of the votes cast.

Wilson's endorsement in the runoff was actively sought by both candidates Rahm Emanuel and Jesús "Chuy" García. Wilson endorsed García.

=== 2016 U.S. presidential campaign ===
Willie Wilson 2016
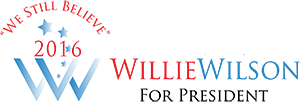
- Campaign: 2016 United States presidential election
- Candidate: Willie Wilson
- Affiliation: Democratic Party
- Status: Dropped Out
- Headquarters: 345 E. Wacker Unit 4601, Chicago, IL 60601
- Key people: Andre Fair campaign treasurer
- Receipts: US$1,100,421 (5/06/2016)
- Slogan: We Still Believe

Website
- Archive of Official website

After setting up an exploratory committee on May 11, 2015, Wilson officially announced on June 1, 2015, that he would be running as a candidate for President of the United States in the 2016 election. He ran as a Democrat.

The Wilson campaign was the first presidential campaign, Democratic or Republican, to buy advertisements in the state of Iowa.

Wilson was on the ballot in several states during the 2016 Democratic primaries. He was the only minor candidate to appear on the ballot in South Carolina's "First in the South" primaries, perhaps due to the comparatively higher cost of the state's ballot entry fee. Wilson received 1,314 votes, or 0.35% of the total, in South Carolina, placing ahead of former Maryland Governor Martin O'Malley. Wilson dropped out on April 12, 2016.

In the general election, Wilson voted for Republican nominee Donald Trump.

More information

Map demonstrating the ballot access of Wilson's campaign Legend: On ballot On ballot as other Not on ballot

Map of third-place finishes in Democratic primaries and caucuses Legend: Steve Burke Rocky De La Fuente Paul T. Farrell Jr. Martin O'Malley Willie Wilson Uncommitted No third place candidate

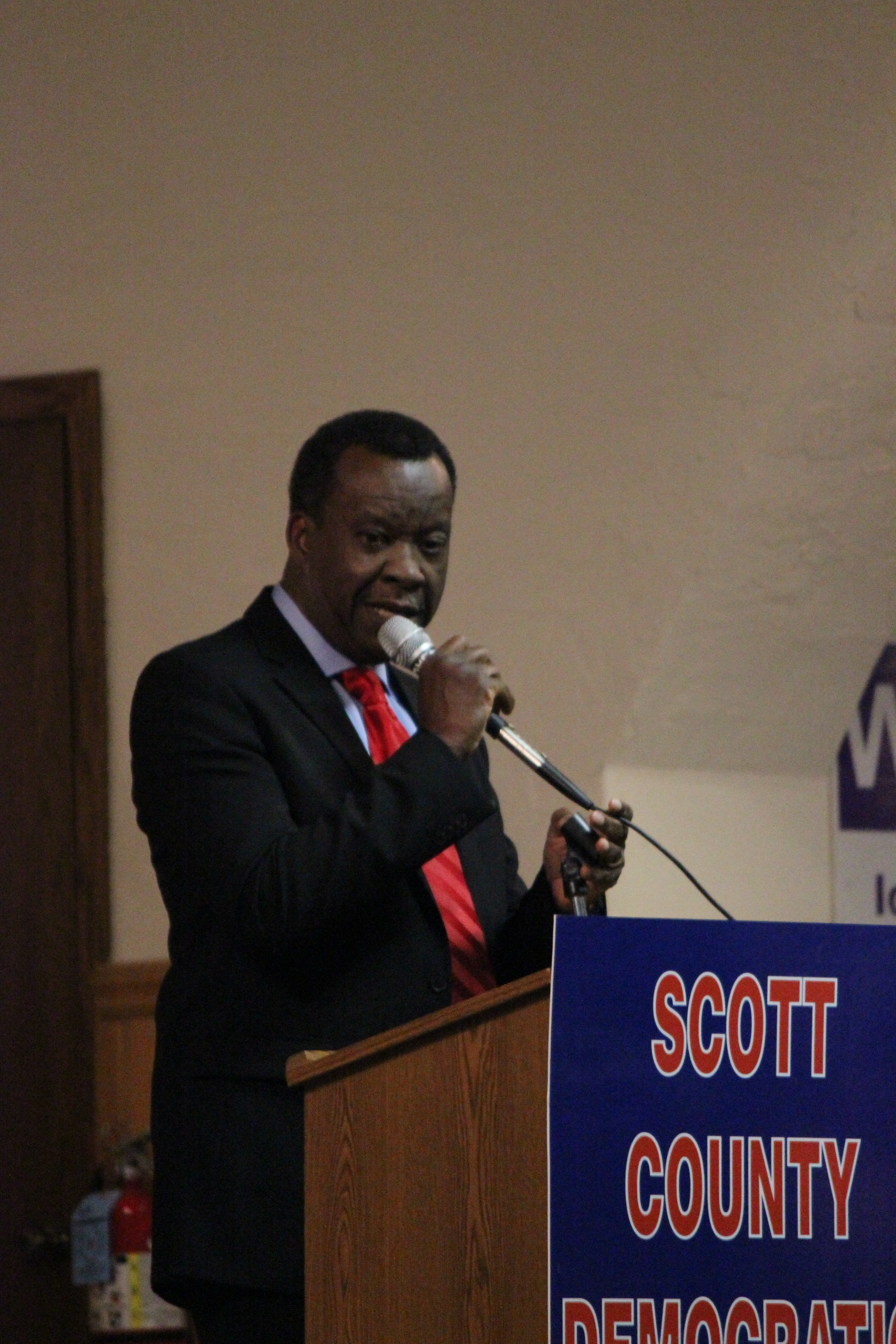
Wilson speaking at the 2016 Scott County, Iowa Democratic Party Dinner

Detailed below are the FEC-filed finances of Willie Wilson 2016 as of 5/6/2016

Receipts
Financial Source	Amount (USD)
Federal Funds	0
Itemized Individual Contributions	28,685
Unitemized Individual Contributions	6,705
Party Committees Contributions	0
Other Committees Contributions	0
Total Contributions	35,390
Transfers from Authorized Committees	0
Candidate Loans	1,055,100
Other Loans	0
Total Loans	1,055,100
Offsets to Operating Expenditures	9,931
Fundraising Offsets	0
Legal and Accounting Offsets	0
Total Offsets	9,857
Other Receipts	0
Total Receipts	1,100,421

Disbursements
Disbursements	Amount (USD)
Operating Expenditures	1,055,444
Transfers To Authorized Committees	0
Fundraising	0
Exempt Legal and Accounting	0
Candidate Loan Repayments	11,627
Other Loan Repayments	0
Total Loan Repayments	11,627
Individual Contribution Refunds	0
Political Party Contribution Refunds	0
Other Committee Contribution Refunds	0
Total Contribution Refunds	0
Other Disbursements	33,350
Total Disbursements	1,100,421

Cash Summary
Category	Amount (USD)
Beginning Cash On Hand	0
Current Cash On Hand	0
Net Contributions	35,390
Net Operating Expenditures	1,045,512
Debts/Loans Owed By Campaign	1,043,472
Debts/Loans Owed To Campaign	0

=== 2019 Chicago mayoral campaign ===
In March 2018, Wilson formally announced that he would run a second time for Mayor of Chicago in the 2019 mayoral election.

During his campaign, Wilson generated controversy for handing out money to churchgoers. This practice of his was challenged before the Illinois State Board of Elections, which found that it did not violate any campaign finance laws since the money came from his non-profit foundation. Wilson defended his actions, declaring that his church appearances were not campaign-related, and that he was not buying votes. He continued this practice after the decision by the Board of Elections.

During the campaign, in late November 2018, Wilson declared that he believed that other black candidates needed, "to get out of the way."

Wilson launched challenges to the candidature petitions of several black candidates, including Roger Washington, Ja'Mal Green, Neal Sales-Griffin, and Dorothy Brown. At the last minute, Wilson moved to drop his challenge to Sales-Griffin's and Brown's petitions. Brown was still removed from the ballot due to Toni Preckwinkle maintaining her challenge to Brown's petition, but Sales-Griffin was allowed to be included on the ballot. Chicago Electoral Board Chair Marisel Hernandez chastised the Wilson campaign for its political maneuvers regarding ballot challenges.

Wilson was endorsed by the Cook County Republican Party.

Wilson failed to make it to the runoff, placing fourth with 59,072 votes, equal 10.61% of vote cast. Wilson performed very well on the West and South sides of the city. Despite placing fourth, Wilson had a plurality of the vote in more wards than any other candidate (he came first in thirteen wards). The thirteen wards that Wilson carried a plurality of the vote in were all predominately black (these being thirteen out of the total of eighteen wards in the city that are predominately black).

Again, Wilson's endorsement was actively sought by both candidates in the runoff. Wilson endorsed Lori Lightfoot.

=== 2020 U.S. Senate campaign ===
In August 2019, Wilson expressed his intention to challenge incumbent United States Senator from Illinois Dick Durbin in 2020, running in the general election as an independent challenger to Durbin. Rather than run as an independent, he ultimately opted to run under the ballot line of his newly created "Willie Wilson Party".

Wilson received the support of three current and former Chicago aldermen, as well as that of the Fraternal Order of Police.

Wilson received 4% of the vote statewide, finishing in a distant third place. His highest support came from the majority-black wards of Chicago where he had done well in both his mayoral campaigns. Totaling up all 18 of Chicago's majority-black wards, Wilson garnered 18.5% of the vote, well ahead of Republican Mark Curran, who received only 4%, but still far behind Durbin who received 75.9%.

=== 2023 Chicago mayoral campaign ===
Wilson launched a third campaign to become the Mayor of Chicago. Wilson ran as an independent, as Chicago hosts non-partisan elections. In the winter, Wilson donated various resources to combat the COVID-19 pandemic. In response to high inflation, Wilson organized various gas giveaways and food donations.

Wilson’s campaign cited key issues in his platform as being small businesses, increasing safety, and ‘rebuilding’ Chicago. Wilson advocated for increased safety on public transport, crime reduction, tax reduction, and opposing corruption. He also supported the abolishment of red-light traffic cameras, parking meter reform, and other issues.

Wilson accused incumbent mayor Lori Lightfoot of mismanagement, especially relating to gas prices and economic reinvigoration. He also called out corruption in the city, and said some officials were “out of touch” with the public. Wilson criticized earlier decisions to implement previous safety measures amid the COVID-19 pandemic that had the impact of temporary prohibiting church gatherings.

Describing himself as "pro policeman", Wilson stood in opposition to rules and regulations that he regards as hindering the police's ability to combat crime. At one mayoral debate, Wilson declared that the city should, "Take the handcuffs off the policy, [sic] put them on people that's actually doing [crime]," and that those who flee police should be, "hunted down like rabbits". Wilson spoke positively of the Chicago Police Department.

Wilson was considered to be the only of the nine candidates on the ballot not to be affiliated with the Democratic Party, though the election is officially nonpartisan.

In the initial round of the election, Wilson was defeated, placing fifth of nine candidates with 49,248 votes (9.57% of the election's overall vote). A week after the first round, Wilson subsequently endorsed Paul Vallas in the runoff election.

=== 2027 Chicago mayoral election ===
In May 2026, Wilson launched an exploratory committee for a potential fourth mayoral campaign in the 2027 mayoral election. He formally announced his candidacy on August 5, 2026.

== Personal life ==
Wilson is married to Janette Wilson. As of 2023, he lives in Chicago's downtown.

Wilson's son Omar, who was involved in gangs and drug dealing, was shot and killed at the age of 20.

== Political positions ==
Wilson self-identifies as an independent Democrat.

In the 2016 United States Presidential general election, Wilson personally voted for Republican nominee Donald Trump. When asked in 2019 about his possible vote in the 2020 election, Wilson declared, "I am not going to vote, nor will I ever vote again, for President Trump."

During the COVID-19 pandemic in Illinois, Wilson advocated that churches should be allowed to hold in-person services despite the state's stay-at-home order.

In his 2023 mayoral campaign, Wilson described himself as "pro policeman".

=== Economic policy ===
Wilson stated in 2019 that he believes the spending of tax money has "not proportionately benefited all races of citizens," in Illinois.

=== LGBTQ rights ===
Wilson tweeted in response to the Obergefell v. Hodges decision, “I disagree with what I consider the Supreme Court’s reinterpretation of what constitutes marriage. Marriage has and should always be that sacred union between a man and a woman. Period." However, in 2018, Wilson declared that he had changed his mind on the issue of same-sex marriage, declaring that he now believes that, "everybody is entitled to do whatever they want to do and be with whoever they want to be."

In a 2018 interview with the Chicago Sun-Times, Wilson stated that his upbringing in the Deep South had made it difficult for him to understand the LGBTQ community, but that he was "reaching out" and seeking to "learn".

== Electoral history ==
=== Mayoral ===
2015 Chicago mayoral election
Candidate	General Election		Runoff Election	
Candidate	Votes	%	Votes	%
Rahm Emanuel (incumbent)	218,217	45.63	332,171	56.23
Jesús "Chuy" García	160,414	33.55	258,562	43.77
Willie Wilson	50,960	10.66		
Robert W. "Bob" Fioretti	35,363	7.39		
William "Dock" Walls, III	13,250	2.77		
Write-ins	52	0.01		
Total	478,256	100	590,733	100

2019 Chicago mayoral election
Candidate	General Election		Runoff Election	
Candidate	Votes	%	Votes	%
Lori Lightfoot	97,667	17.54	386,039	73.70
Toni Preckwinkle	89,343	16.04	137,765	26.30
William Daley	82,294	14.78		
Willie Wilson	59,072	10.61		
Susana Mendoza	50,373	9.05		
Amara Enyia	44,589	8.00		
Jerry Joyce	40,099	7.20		
Gery Chico	34,521	6.20		
Paul Vallas	30,236	5.43		
Garry McCarthy	14,784	2.66		
La Shawn K. Ford	5,606	1.01		
Robert "Bob" Fioretti	4,302	0.77		
John Kolzar	2,349	0.42		
Neal Sales-Griffin	1,523	0.27		
Write-ins	86	0.02		
Total	556,844	100	523,804	100

2023 Chicago mayoral election
Candidate	General election		Runoff election	
Candidate	Votes	%	Votes	%
Brandon Johnson	122,093	21.63	319,481	52.16
Paul Vallas	185,743	32.90	293,033	47.84
Lori Lightfoot (incumbent)	94,890	16.81		
Chuy García	77,222	13.68		
Willie Wilson	51,567	9.13		
Ja'Mal Green	12,257	2.17		
Kam Buckner	11,092	1.96		
Sophia King	7,191	1.27		
Roderick Sawyer	2,440	0.43		
Write-ins	29	0.00		
Total	564,524	100.00	612,514	100.00

=== 2016 Democratic presidential primaries ===
Primaries and Caucus Results
Date	Contest	Votes	Place	Percent	Delegates	Source(s)
February 1	Iowa caucus	0	N/A	0.00	0	The Green Papers
February 27	South Carolina primary	1,314	3rd of 4	0.35	0	The Green Papers
March 1	Texas primary	3,254	5th of 8	0.23	0	The Green Papers
March 5	Louisiana primary	1,423	6th of 10	0.46	0	The Green Papers
March 8	Mississippi primary	919	3rd of 5	0.40	0	The Green Papers
March 15	Illinois primary	6,565	3rd of 8	0.32	0	The Green Papers
March 15	Missouri primary	307	8th of 10^{A}	0.05	0	The Green Papers
June 7	California primary	10,544	3rd of 7	0.24	0	The Green Papers
June 7	North Dakota caucus	0		0.00	0	The Green Papers
Total (Current)		25,796	8th^{B}	0.08	0	The Green Papers

A. Counting Uncommitted as having placed 3rd
B. Counting Uncommitted, No Preference, and scattering, respectively, as placing 4th, 6th, and 7th

=== United States Senate ===
2020 United States Senate election in Illinois
Party	Candidate	Votes	%
Democratic	Dick Durbin (incumbent)	3,278,930	54.93
Republican	Mark Curran	2,319,870	38.87
Willie Wilson Party	Willie Wilson	237,699	3.98
Libertarian	Danny Malouf	75,673	1.27
Green	David Black	55,711	0.95
Write-in		18	0.00
Total votes		5,968,901	100

== See also ==
- List of African-American United States Senate candidates
