= Chamical Department =

Chamical Departamento Chamical
- Department
- Interactive map of Chamical
- Country: Argentina
- Seat: Chamical

Area
  - Total: 5,549 km^{2} (2,142 sq mi)

Population (2022)
  - Total: 15,666
  - Density: 2.823/km^{2} (7.312/sq mi)

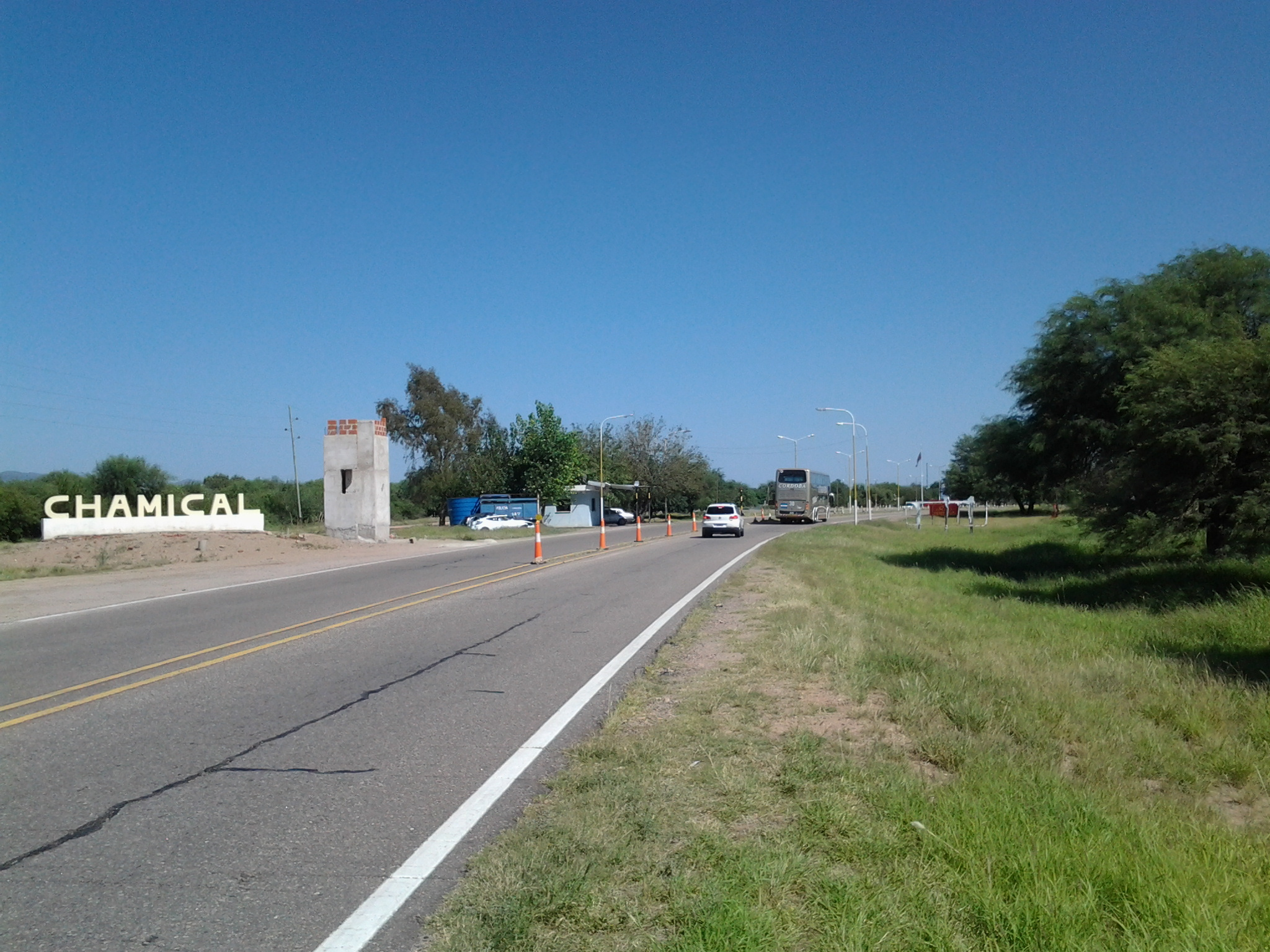
Chamical

Chamical is a department of the province of La Rioja (Argentina).

== Settlements ==
- Bella Vista
- Chamical
- El Retamo
- Esquina del Norte
- Los Baldes
- Polco
