= 2015 Chicago mayoral election =

- February 24, 2015 (first round); April 7, 2015 (runoff)
- Turnout: 33.65% ▼8.34 pp (first round); 40.98% ▲7.07 pp (second round)
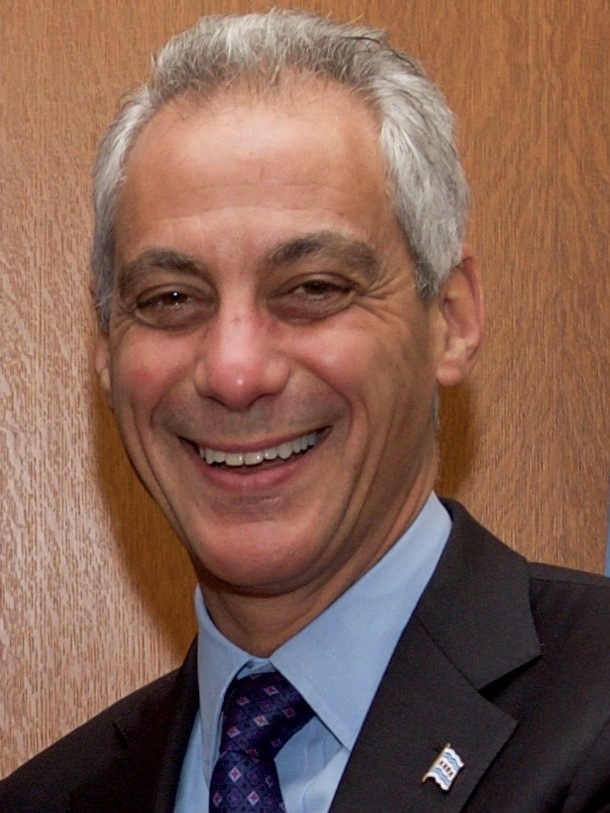

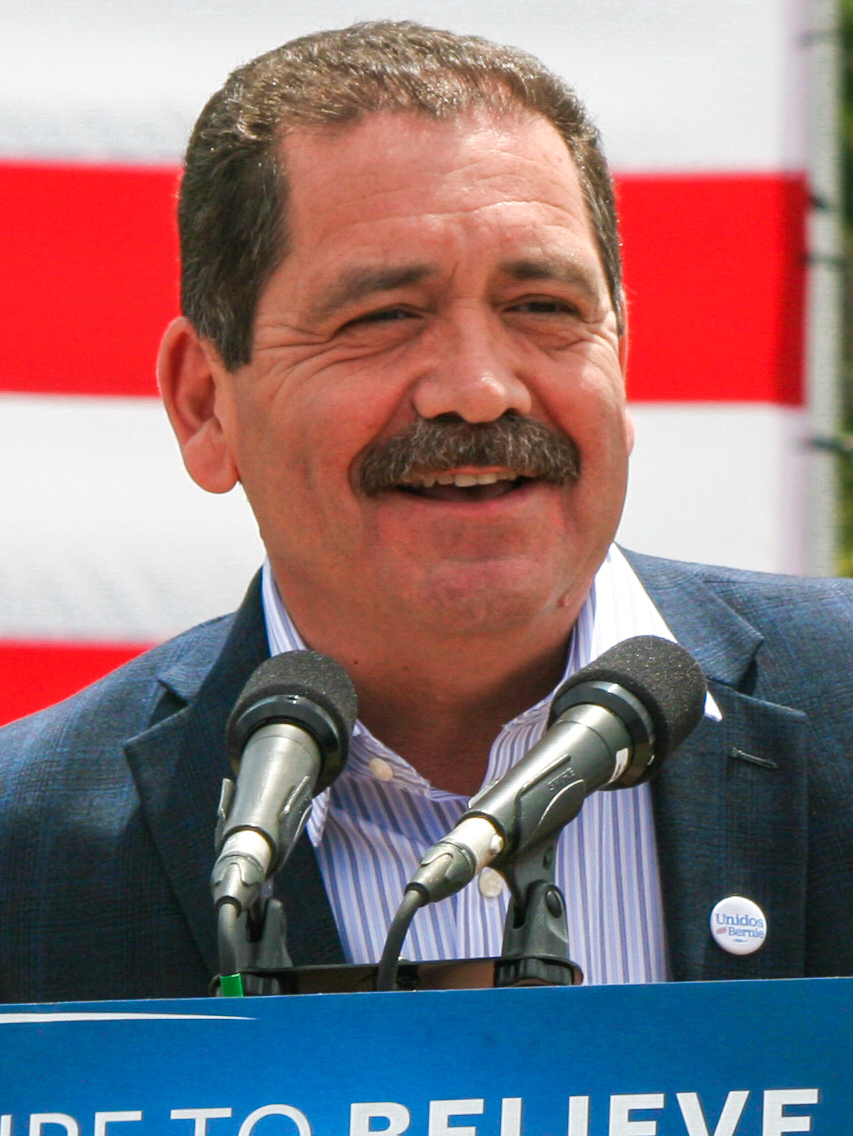

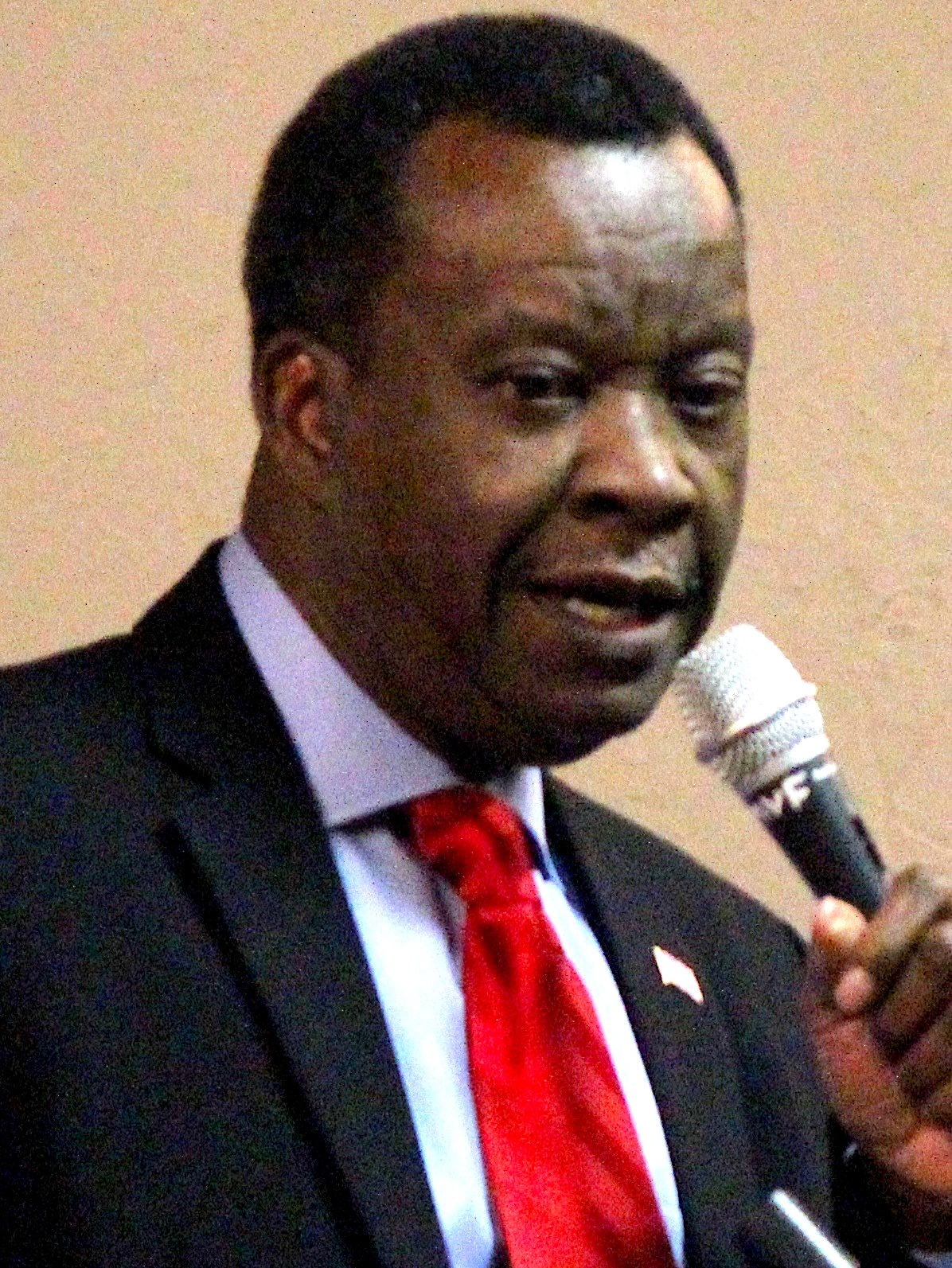

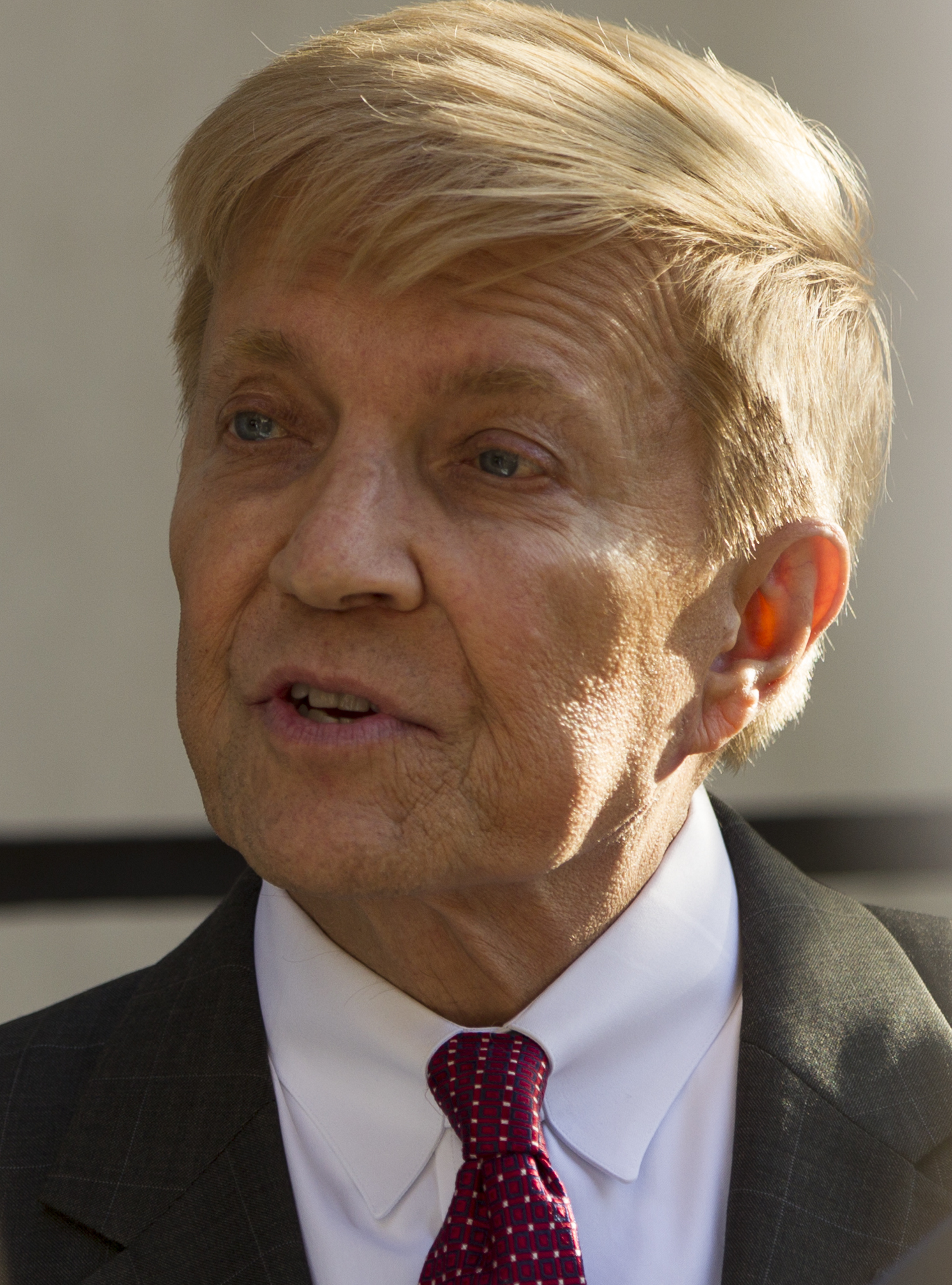
Nominee	Rahm Emanuel	Chuy García
First round	218,217; 45.63%	160,414; 33.55%
Runoff	332,171; 56.23%	258,562; 43.77%
Nominee	Willie Wilson	Bob Fioretti
First round	50,960; 10.66%	35,363; 7.39%
Runoff	Eliminated	Eliminated
- Emanuel: 50–60% 60–70% 70–80% 80–90% >90% García: 50–60% 60–70% 70–80% 80–90% >90% Tie: 50%
Mayor before election
Rahm Emanuel
Elected Mayor
Rahm Emanuel

An election took place on February 24, 2015, to elect the mayor of Chicago. The election was non-partisan and no candidate received a majority. A runoff election was held between the top two finishers (both Democrats) on April 7, 2015, and resulted in the reelection of incumbent mayor Rahm Emanuel. The elections were concurrent with the 2015 Chicago aldermanic elections.

Emanuel ran for reelection, seeking a second term in office. In the first round, Emanuel received 46% of the vote and Democratic Cook County Commissioner Jesús "Chuy" García received 34%. Because no candidate received a majority, a runoff was held. In the runoff, Emanuel received 56.23% of the vote, winning the election. Garcia received 43.77% of the vote. 2015 was the first time the election advanced to a runoff since mayoral elections became non-partisan in 1999.

== Candidates ==
=== Ran ===
- Rahm Emanuel, incumbent mayor
- Bob Fioretti, Chicago City Alderman
- Jesús "Chuy" García, Cook County Commissioner and former state senator
- William "Dock" Walls, community activist, businessman, former aide to Mayor Harold Washington and perennial candidate
- Willie Wilson, medical supply company executive

==== Write-in candidates ====
- William H. Calloway
- Christopher Ware
- Mary Vann

=== Withdrew ===
- Frederick Collins, Chicago police officer
- Amara Enyia, urban affairs consultant and community activist
- William J. Kelly, political activist, columnist and Republican candidate for Illinois Comptroller in 2010 and 2014
- Gerald Sconyers
- Robert Shaw, former Chicago City Alderman and former commissioner of the Cook County Board of Review

=== Removed ===
- Fenton Patterson, perennial candidate

=== Declined ===
- Leslie Hairston, Chicago City Alderman
- Karen Lewis, president of the Chicago Teachers Union
- Toni Preckwinkle, president of the Cook County Board of Commissioners
- Kwame Raoul, state senator
- Scott Waguespack, Chicago city alderman

== General election ==
=== Endorsements ===
Rahm Emanuel

Officeholders

- Gery Chico, Chair of the Illinois State Board of Education and former president of the Chicago Park District Board of Commissioners, candidate for mayor in 2011
- Richard M. Daley, former mayor of Chicago
- Barack Obama, President of the United States

Media

- The Chicago Defender
- Chicago Sun-Times
- Chicago Tribune
- Crain's Chicago Business

Organizations

- Planned Parenthood Illinois Action
Robert Fioretti

Individuals

- Mike Ditka, former coach of the Chicago Bears
- Amara Enyia, previously a candidate for mayor

Organizations

- Chicago Police Sergeants Association
- Green Party of Chicago
- Progressive Caucus of the Chicago City Council
Jesús "Chuy" García

Officeholders

- Miguel del Valle, former City Clerk of Chicago, former Illinois state senator, 2011 mayoral candidate
- David Orr, Cook County Clerk and former acting mayor of Chicago
- Bobbie L. Steele, former president of the Cook County Board of Commissioners

Individuals

- Karen Lewis, President of the Chicago Teachers Union

Media

- The Gazette

Organizations

- Chicago Teachers Union
- Independent Voters of Illinois Independent Precinct Organization
- Progressive Action Project
- United Working Families
William "Dock" Walls

Media

- Illinois Herald
Willie Wilson

Politicians

- Danny K. Davis, US congressman and candidate for mayor of Chicago in 1999 and 2011
- Robert Shaw, former Chicago City Alderman and former commissioner of the Cook County Board of Review, previously a candidate for mayor

=== Polling ===
View source data.

Poll source	Date(s) administered	Sample size	Margin of error	Rahm Emanuel	Robert Fioretti	Jesús García	William Walls	Willie Wilson	Other	Undecided
Ogden & Fry	February 22, 2015	737	± 3.68%	48.3%	6.8%	26.5%	3.3%	15.2%	—	—
APC Research	February ? 2015	709	± 3.7%	45%	7%	20%	2%	7%	—	18%
Ogden & Fry	February 14, 2015	736	± 3.69%	49.2%	8.6%	23.0%	4.9%	14.4%	—	—
Ogden & Fry	January 31, 2015	884	± 3.36%	41.7%	6.7%	16.6%	1.7%	9.7%	—	23.5%
APC Research	January 22–27, 2015	708	± 3.7%	42%	10%	18%	2%	7%	—	20%
Ogden & Fry	January 24, 2015	950	± 3.24%	39.5%	7.5%	18%	1.8%	11.1%	—	22.2%
Lake Research Partners	January 15–19, 2015	600	± 4%	38%	8%	16%	1%	5%	—	30%
Ogden & Fry	January 17, 2015	1,010	± 3.15%	38%	6.7%	16.4%	1.5%	10.6%	—	26.7%
GQR*	January 3–6, 2015	600	± 4%	50%	10%	22%	2%	7%	—	9%
GQR*	December 2014	600	± 4%	48%	13%	21%	—	—	18%	
David Binder Research	November 23–25, 2014	800	± 3.5%	44%	15%	16%	—	—	7%	18%
Lake Research Partners	November 2014	621	± 3.9%	33%	13%	18%	—	—	—	36%

- * Internal poll for the Rahm Emanuel campaign
Hypothetical polling

Poll source	Date(s) administered	Sample size	Margin of error	Rahm Emanuel	Robert Fioretti	Karen Lewis	Toni Preckwinkle	Robert Shaw	Undecided
McKeon	May 7, 2014	511	± 4.2%	29%	5%	10%	26%	3%	27%

Poll source	Date(s) administered	Sample size	Margin of error	Rahm Emanuel	Karen Lewis	"Qualified Republican"	Undecided
Ogden & Fry	August 9, 2014	1,152	±2.9%	33.9%	20.6%	14.3%	31.3%

=== Results ===
Chicago mayoral election, 2015
Party	Candidate	Votes	%
Nonpartisan	Rahm Emanuel (incumbent)	218,217	45.63%
Nonpartisan	Jesús "Chuy" García	160,414	33.55%
Nonpartisan	Willie Wilson	50,960	10.66%
Nonpartisan	Robert W. "Bob" Fioretti	35,363	7.39%
Nonpartisan	William "Dock" Walls, III	13,250	2.77%
Write-in	Christopher Ware	40	0.01%
Write-in	William H. Calloway	9	0.00%
Write-in	Mary Vann	3	0.00%
Total votes		478,256	100.00%

==== Results by ward ====
Support for Wilson by ward:
>30%
25–30%
20–25%
15–20%
10–15%
5–10%
0–5%

Support for Fioretti by ward:
>15%
12–15%
9–12%
6–9%
3–6%
0–3%

Support for Walls by ward:
>7%
6–7%
5–6%
4–5%
3–4%
2–3%
1–2%
0–1%

Emanuel
García

Ward	Emanuel votes	Emanuel %	Wilson votes	Wilson %	Fioretti votes	Fioretti %	García votes	García %	Walls votes	Walls %	Total votes	Turnout
1st	3,349	39.60%	260	3.07%	618	7.31%	4,128	48.81%	103	1.22%	8,458	28.93%
2nd	6,727	64.47%	331	3.17%	863	8.27%	2,428	23.27%	85	0.81%	10,434	32.17%
3rd	5,223	49.07%	1,768	16.61%	954	8.96%	2,211	20.77%	489	4.59%	10,645	33.12%
4th	5,329	44.56%	1,703	14.24%	942	7.88%	3,396	28.40%	588	4.92%	11,958	39.01%
5th	5,088	44.00%	1,494	12.92%	533	4.61%	3,890	33.64%	588	4.83%	11,563	39.44%
6th	4,703	42.63%	2,569	23.28%	519	4.70%	2,525	22.89%	717	6.50%	11,033	32.78%
7th	4,690	43.76%	2,294	21.40%	439	4.10%	2,595	24.21%	700	6.53%	10,718	33.07%
8th	5,938	43.39%	2,987	21.83%	569	4.16%	3,289	24.03%	903	6.60%	13,686	36.50%
9th	5,186	43.30%	2,873	23.99%	517	4.32%	2,625	21.92%	777	6.49%	11,978	32.86%
10th	3,586	37.74%	482	5.07%	816	8.59%	4,501	47.37%	116	1.22%	9,501	37.15%
11th	4,711	48.93%	253	2.63%	1,440	14.95%	3,140	32.61%	85	0.88%	9,629	37.81%
12th	1,284	25.70%	96	1.92%	241	4.82%	3,335	66.74%	41	0.82%	4,997	27.87%
13th	5,822	52.04%	210	1.88%	1,021	9.13%	4,067	36.35%	67	0.60%	11,187	46.75%
14th	2,293	37.99%	107	1.77%	448	7.42%	3,151	52.20%	37	0.61%	6,036	33.87%
15th	1,403	30.02%	599	12.82%	156	3.34%	2,394	51.23%	121	2.59%	4,673	25.63%
16th	2,451	39.88%	1,641	26.70%	211	3.43%	1,552	25.25%	291	4.73%	6,146	23.57%
17th	3,499	40.08%	2,313	26.50%	323	3.70%	2,092	23.97%	502	5.75%	8,729	28.53%
18th	4,794	38.99%	2,043	16.62%	800	6.51%	3,988	32.44%	669	5.44%	12,294	38.68%
19th	7,613	41.95%	1,139	6.28%	2,503	13.79%	6,509	35.87%	383	2.11%	18,147	51.83%
20th	2,808	40.59%	1,693	24.47%	231	3.34%	1,798	25.99%	388	5.61%	6,918	26.96%
21st	5,698	42.56%	3,249	24.27%	533	3.98%	2,973	22.20%	936	6.99%	13,389	35.01%
22nd	1,127	21.18%	279	5.24%	137	2.57%	3,711	69.73%	68	1.28%	5,322	28.15%
23rd	3,868	40.19%	232	2.41%	1308	13.59%	4,165	43.27%	52	0.54%	9,625	42.97%
24th	2,653	36.50%	2,209	30.39%	324	4.46%	1,701	23.40%	381	5.24%	7,268	27.07%
25th	2,586	33.40%	263	3.40%	497	6.42%	4,331	55.94%	65	0.84%	7,742	30.73%
26th	2,331	34.33%	359	5.29%	348	5.13%	3,665	53.98%	87	1.28%	6,790	27.48%
27th	4,291	48.61%	1,640	18.58%	695	7.87%	1,911	21.65%	290	3.29%	8,827	27.51%
28th	3,084	39.92%	2,043	26.45%	596	7.72%	1,682	21.77%	320	4.14%	7,725	23.84%
29th	4,662	41.99%	2,460	22.16%	723	6.51%	2,748	24.75%	510	4.59%	11,103	32.17%
30th	2,018	39.60%	149	2.92%	391	7.67%	2,489	48.84%	49	0.96%	5,096	23.88%
31st	2,381	40.61%	141	2.40%	291	4.96%	2,996	51.10%	54	0.92%	5,863	27.36%
32nd	4,111	47.61%	188	2.18%	712	8.25%	3,559	41.22%	64	0.74%	8,634	28.34%
33rd	3,332	40.02%	272	3.27%	532	6.39%	4,084	49.06%	105	1.26%	8,325	36.34%
34th	5,722	45.46%	3,127	24.85%	413	3.28%	2,581	20.51%	743	5.90%	12,586	32.72%
35th	2,110	40.02%	188	3.00%	336	5.36%	3,580	57.06%	60	0.96%	6,274	28.72%
36th	2,380	39.31%	281	4.64%	611	10.09%	2,731	45.10%	52	0.86%	6,055	28.44%
37th	3,465	41.38%	2,372	28.33%	373	4.45%	1,754	20.95%	409	4.88%	12,586	40.16%
38th	5,408	48.09%	315	2.80%	1,705	15.16%	3,723	33.11%	95	0.84%	11,246	38.00%
39th	5,499	48.48%	355	3.13%	1,187	10.47%	4,202	37.05%	99	0.87%	11,342	38.93%
40th	4,634	47.26%	300	3.06%	636	6.49%	4136	42.18%	99	1.01%	9,805	35.27%
41st	7,153	47.80%	451	3.01%	2,644	17.67%	4,605	30.77%	112	0.75%	14,965	43.58%
42nd	6,558	73.52%	262	2.94%	548	6.14%	1,476	16.55%	76	0.85%	8,920	28.49%
43rd	7,608	71.97%	283	2.68%	665	6.29%	1,938	18.33%	77	0.73%	10,571	34.94%
44th	6,055	64.25%	211	2.24%	554	554%	2,543	26.98%	61	0.65%	9,424	31.62%
45th	6,243	48.06%	406	3.13%	1,682	12.95%	4,545	34.99%	115	0.89%	12,991	41.65%
46th	6,079	57.55%	520	4.92%	518	4.90%	3,316	31.39%	130	1.23%	10,563	36.84%
47th	6,427	51.47%	267	2.14	721	5.77%	4,985	39.92%	88	0.70%	12,488	37.59%
48th	5,906	52.33%	450	3.99%	560	4.96%	4,220	37.39%	150	1.33%	11,286	37.89%
49th	3,941	44.10%	492	5.51%	431	4.82%	3,893	43.57%	179	2.00%	8,936	35.60%
50th	4,390	55.29%	341	4.29%	548	6.90%	2,557	32.20%	104	1.31%	7,940	31.87%

== Runoff ==
=== Endorsements ===
Rahm Emanuel

Officeholders

- Gery Chico, Chair of the Illinois State Board of Education and former president of the Chicago Park District Board of Commissioners, candidate for mayor in 2011
- Richard M. Daley, former mayor of Chicago
- Dick Durbin, U.S. senator
- James Meeks, state senator and candidate for mayor in 2011
- Barack Obama, President of the United States
- Bobby Rush, U.S. representative
- Luis Gutierrez, U.S. reperesentative

Organizations

- Planned Parenthood Illinois Action
- Sierra Club

Media

- The Chicago Defender
- Chicago Sun-Times
- Chicago Tribune
- Crain's Chicago Business
Jesús "Chuy" García

Officeholders

- Bernie Sanders, United States senator from Vermont
- Luis Arroyo Jr., Cook County commissioner
- Richard Boykin, Cook County Commissioner
- Danny K. Davis, U.S. representative, candidate for mayor in 1991 and 2011
- Howard Dean, former governor of Vermont, former chairman of the Democratic National Committee, and candidate for President in 2004
- Miguel del Valle, former City Clerk of Chicago, former Illinois state senator, 2011 mayoral candidate
- Jesse Jackson, former shadow senator from the District of Columbia, minister, and civil rights activist
- Emil Jones, former president of the Illinois Senate
- Stanley Moore, Cook County commissioner
- Ricardo Muñoz, Chicago city alderman
- David Orr, Cook County clerk and former acting mayor of Chicago
- Bobbie L. Steele, former president of the Cook County Board of Commissioners
- Robert Steele, Cook County commissioner
- Scott Waguespack, Chicago city alderman

Individuals

- Troy LaRaviere, educator
- Karen Lewis, President of the Chicago Teachers Union
- David Moore, Chicago City Alderman-elect
- Carlos Ramirez-Rosa, Chicago City Alderman-elect
- Diane Ravitch, education historian, educational policy analyst, and former Assistant United States Secretary of Education
- Willie Wilson, businessman, philanthropist, 2015 candidate for Mayor of Chicago.

Media

- Chicago Jewish Star
- The Gazette

Organizations

- Chicago Teachers Union
- Independent Voters of Illinois Independent Precinct Organization
- Progressive Action Project
- SEIU Healthcare Illinois & Indiana
- SEIU Local 1
- Teamsters Local 743
- United Working Families
Declined to endorse

Individuals

- Toni Preckwinkle, President of the Cook County Board of Commissioners

Organizations

- SEIU Local 73

=== Polling ===
View source data.

Poll source	Date(s) administered	Sample size	Margin of error	Rahm Emanuel	Jesús García	Undecided
Ogden & Fry	March 21, 2015	951	± 3.24%	48.5%	32.1%	18.4%
We Ask America	March 16, 2015	1,374	± 3%	51%	36%	12%
Ogden & Fry	March 15, 2015	920	± 3.3%	55%	45%	0%
APC Research Inc.	March 13, 2015	712	± 3.7%	51%	37%	11%
Ogden & Fry	March 7, 2015	1,020	± 3.13%	43.5%	38%	18%
We Ask America	February 28, 2015	1,138	± 2.9%	49%	38%	14%
Ogden & Fry	February 28, 2015	979	± 3.2%	42.9%	38.5%	18.6%
Ogden & Fry	February 25, 2015	1,058	± 3.07%	42.7%	38.7%	18.6%
GSG	February 25, 2015	2,659	± 1.9%	50.4%	39.8%	9.8%
Ogden & Fry	January 24, 2015	950	± 3.24%	54.9%	45.1%	—
Lake Research Partners	January 15–19, 2015	600	± 4%	44%	28%	27%
David Binder Research	November 23–25, 2014	800	± 3.5%	49%	37%	14%
Lake Research Partners	November 2014	621	± 3.9%	36%	31%	23%

Hypothetical polling

Poll source	Date(s) administered	Sample size	Margin of error	Rahm Emanuel	Karen Lewis	Undecided
APC Research	August 6–12, 2014	800	± 3.5%	39%	43%	14%
David Binder Research	July 24–27, 2014	600	± ?	45%	33%	22%
We Ask America	July 9, 2014	1,037	± 3.04%	36.44%	45.35%	18.21%

Poll source	Date(s) administered	Sample size	Margin of error	Rahm Emanuel	Toni Preckwinkle	Undecided
We Ask America	July 9, 2014	1,037	± 3.04%	30.98%	55.23%	13.79%
Strive Strategies	March 25–26, 2014	724	± 3.49%	32%	40%	28%

Poll source	Date(s) administered	Sample size	Margin of error	Rahm Emanuel	Robert Shaw	Undecided
We Ask America	July 9, 2014	1,037	± 3.04%	47.66%	29.55%	22.79%

Poll source	Date(s) administered	Sample size	Margin of error	Rahm Emanuel	Robert Fioretti	Undecided
David Binder Research	July 24–27, 2014	600	± ?	46%	27%	27%
We Ask America	July 9, 2014	1,037	± 3.04%	45.08%	30.63%	24.29%

- * Internal poll for the Rahm Emanuel campaign

=== Results ===
Chicago mayoral election, 2015
Party	Candidate	Votes	%
Nonpartisan	Rahm Emanuel (incumbent)	332,171	56.23%
Nonpartisan	Jesús "Chuy" García	258,562	43.77%
Total votes		590,733	100.00%

==== Results by ward ====
Emanuel
García

Ward	Emanuel votes	Emanuel %	García votes	García %	Total votes	Turnout
1st	4,748	44.26%	5,979	55.74%	10,727	35.87%
2nd	10,931	77.17%	3,233	22.83%	14,164	42.84%
3rd	8,557	66.24%	4,362	33.76%	12,919	39.53%
4th	8,244%	58.90%	5,753	41.10%	13,997	44.93%
5th	7,322%	55.15%	5,954	44.85%	13,276	44.58%
6th	7,000%	56.84%	5,315	43.16%	12,315	36.23%
7th	6,948%	56.46%	5,357	43.54%	12,305	37.54%
8th	9,143%	58.51%	6,483	41.49%	15,626	41.38%
9th	7,728%	58.21%	5,548	41.79%	13,276	36.14%
10th	4,672	40.20%	6,951	59.80%	11,623	44.82%
11th	7,679	61.39%	4,829	38.61%	12,508	48.04%
12th	1,757	25.24%	5,204	74.76%	6,961	38.28%
13th	7,887	55.61%	6,295	44.39%	14,182	58.37%
14th	2,962	35.61%	5,355	64.39%	8,317	45.98%
15th	2,014	31.73%	4,333	68.27%	6,347	34.35%
16th	4,023	51.61%	3,772	48.39%	7,795	29.57%
17th	5,484	55.15%	4,459	44.85%	9,943	32.30%
18th	7,571	51.60%	7,101	48.40%	14,672	45.76%
19th	11,972	59.43%	8,172	40.57%	20,144	56.99%
20th	4,355	53.85%	3,733	46.15%	8,088	31.10%
21st	8,864	58.81%	6,208	41.19%	15,072	39.17%
22nd	1,458	19.63%	5,971	80.37%	7,429	38.82%
23rd	4,905	43.36%	6,407	56.64%	11,312	49.67%
24th	4,253	52.34%	3,873	47.66%	8,126	29.90%
25th	3,839	38.49%	6,135	61.51%	9,974	38.76%
26th	2,962	34.81%	5,548	65.19%	8,510	33.80%
27th	6,705	63.90%	3,788	36.10%	10,493	32.18%
28th	5,416	57.55%	3,995	42.45%	9,411	28.67%
29th	7,546	57.27%	5,630	42.73%	13,176	37.77%
30th	3,067	40.95%	4,423	59.05%	7,490	34.67%
31st	3,192	37.74%	5,265	62.26%	8,457	38.81%
32nd	7,808	62.32%	4,721	37.68%	12,529	40.31%
33rd	4,412	44.40%	5,525	55.60%	9,937	42.60%
34th	8,616	61.38%	5,421	38.62%	14,037	36.26%
35th	2,769	34.31%	5,302	65.69%	8,071	36.29%
36th	3,551	42.28%	4,847	57.72%	8,398	38.89%
37th	5,943	58.49%	4,217	41.51%	10,160	32.14%
38th	7,648	60.04%	5,090	39.96%	12,738	42.60%
39th	7,671	58.41%	5,462	41.59%	13,133	44.51%
40th	6,528	53.44%	5,688	46.56%	12,216	43.28%
41st	12,007	63.96%	6,766	36.04%	18,773	53.95%
42nd	11,504	84.93%	2,041	15.07%	13,545	42.43%
43rd	12,335	83.41%	2,454	16.59%	14,789	47.90%
44th	10,063	76.33%	3,120	23.67%	13,183	43.40%
45th	9,341	59.24%	6,427	40.76%	15,768	49.82%
46th	8,723	64.68%	4,764	35.32%	13,487	45.95%
47th	10,169	62.97%	5,980	37.03%	16,149	47.77%
48th	8,503	59.35%	5,823	40.65%	14,326	47.31%
49th	5,127	48.38%	5,471	51.62%	10,598	41.48%
50th	6,249	60.90%	4,012	39.10%	10,261	40.69%

== See also ==
- United States elections, 2015
- Chicago aldermanic elections, 2015
