= Polco =

Coordinates: 30°21′S 66°19′W

- Municipality and village
- Interactive map of Polco
- Country: Argentina
- Province: La Rioja Province
- Department: Chamical
- Elevation: 1,483 ft (452 m)

Population (2010)
  - Total: 80
- Time zone: UTC−3 (ART)

Polco is a village within the Chamical Department of La Rioja Province in northwestern Argentina.
