= Ja'Mal Green =

American political candidate

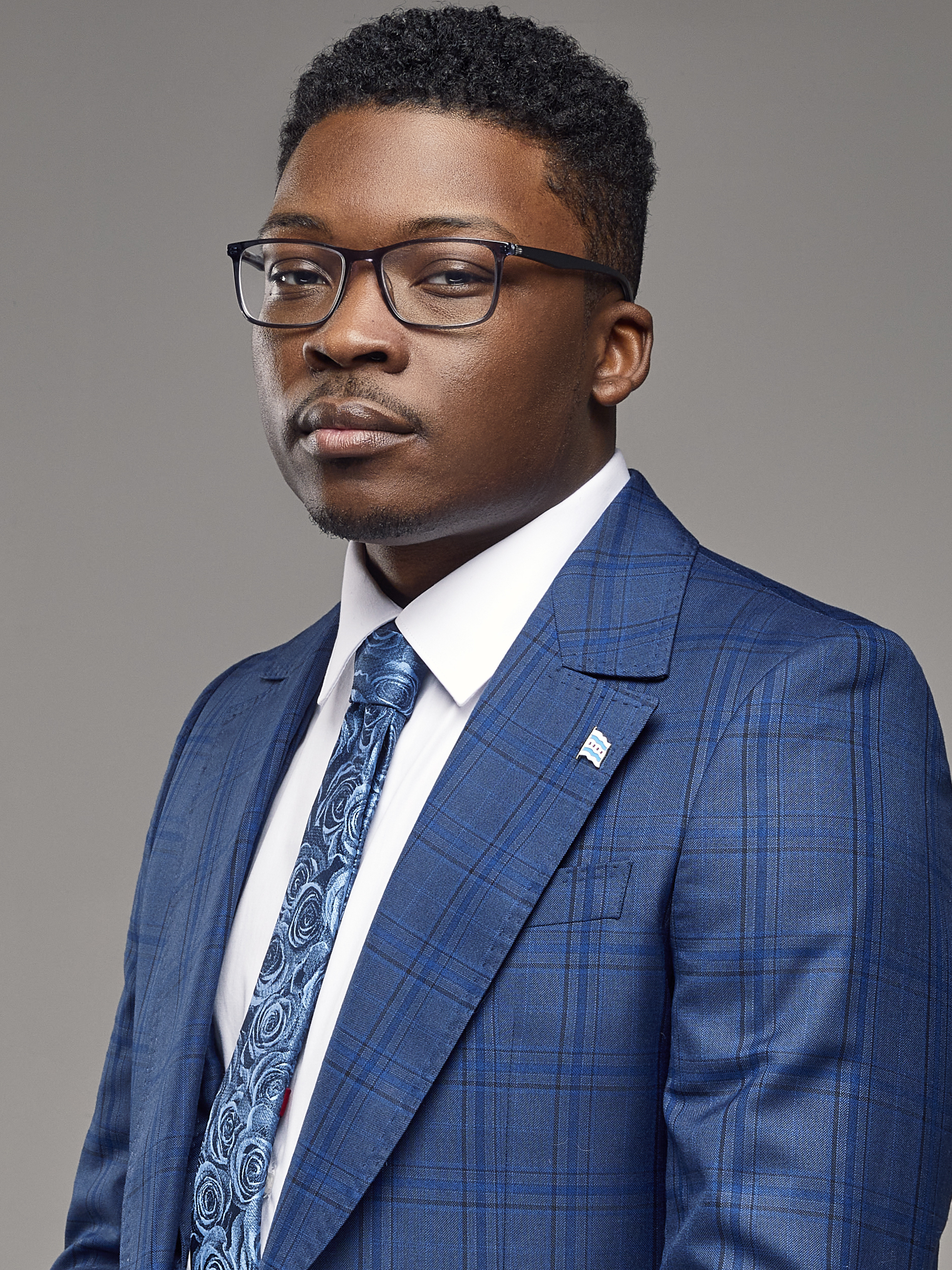
- Green in 2021
- Born: August 9, 1995 (age 31); Chicago, Illinois, U.S.
- Political party: Democratic (before 2025); Independent (2025–present)
- Children: 3

Ja'Mal Green (born August 9, 1995) is an American community activist from Chicago, Illinois. A Black Lives Matter activist, he was an unsuccessful candidate for mayor of Chicago in 2019 and 2023.

== Early life and education ==
Born in 1995, Green grew up in the Englewood, Gresham, and Beverly neighborhoods of Chicago. He was educated at Wendell Phillips Academy High School.

== Career ==
Green has repeatedly stated that he was a surrogate for Bernie Sanders 2016 presidential campaign. That same year, he was arrested along with 19 others at the Taste of Chicago, while attempting to protest police brutality.

In 2018, Green co-founded Majostee Allstars, which provided guidance and training to underprivileged youth. The company was dissolved in May 2024, according to the Illinois Secretary of State.

During 2019 Chicago mayoral election, Green ran for the office as a candidate, but withdrew on January 1, 2019, citing insufficient campaign resources to fight a challenge by Willie Wilson to signatures on his ballot petition. Green got six write-in votes. He endorsed Lori Lightfoot in the runoff election.

During the COVID-19 pandemic, Green created Mobile Nail Salon under the business entity Majostee Spa. Majostee Spa underwent involuntary dissolution that same year, according to Illinois Secretary of State records. Records show that at least five other businesses Green has started (Urban Eyes Development, O and G Family Enterprises, Chicago Sweet Dreams, Majostee Realty, and Sunbend LLC) have similarly undergone involuntary dissolution.

In June 2020, Green started protesting along with other activists against Chase Bank's loan policy and demanded to retain and implement Community Reinvestment Act. On June 3, 2020, WBEZ published a report in which it was written that, in over a six-year period, Chase Bank only handed out 1.9 percent of total loans to black-majority neighborhoods. Due to his persistent protests, he was banned from entering Chase Bank branches in July 2020.

In July 2020, Green and David Doig started The Small Business Repair Program to help black-owned businesses which were affected due to looting.

Green founded My Turn to Own, a home-ownership nonprofit, in 2021. My Turn to Own dissolved in April 2024.

Green garnered some local attention following his activism surrounding the Laquan McDonald case. In February 2022, he was again arrested for taking part in a protest which was demanding the arrest of then-Chicago police officer Jason Van Dyke for the murder of Laquan McDonald.

In June 2022 Green announced that he intended to run for mayor of Chicago again on a platform focused on public safety, modernizing city government, economic development, and climate change. Green filed petitions to be on the ballot for the 2023 Chicago mayoral election in December 2022 and won a lottery to be the first candidate listed on the ballot. In the initial round of the election, Green was defeated, placing sixth of nine candidates with 12,239 votes (2.17% of the election's overall vote).

Green endorsed Paul Vallas in the runoff election. The TRiiBE reported in May 2023 that Green endorsed Vallas one day after Vallas's campaign paid Green $28,460.

In 2023, the Sun-Times reported that Green's company Majostee Marketing (which was dissolved in June, 2023) "steered small businesses seeking COVID-19 relief loans to three lenders that were faulted in a congressional report last year for having turned a blind eye to fraud."

== Books ==
- Class Clown: Three Strikes But Not Out (2014)

== Filmography ==
- Of Boys and Men (2008)
- It Takes a Village (2009)
- Reggie Yates: Life and Death in Chicago Film (2016)

== Electoral history ==
2019 Chicago mayoral election
Candidate	General election		Runoff election	
Candidate	Votes	%	Votes	%
Lori Lightfoot	97,667	17.54	386,039	73.70
Toni Preckwinkle	89,343	16.04	137,765	26.30
William Daley	82,294	14.78		
Willie Wilson	59,072	10.61		
Susana Mendoza	50,373	9.05		
Amara Enyia	44,589	8.00		
Jerry Joyce	40,099	7.20		
Gery Chico	34,521	6.20		
Paul Vallas	30,236	5.43		
Garry McCarthy	14,784	2.66		
La Shawn K. Ford	5,606	1.01		
Robert "Bob" Fioretti	4,302	0.77		
John Kolzar	2,349	0.42		
Neal Sales-Griffin	1,523	0.27		
Robert L. Washington (write-in)	47	0.01		
Tamara McCullough AKA Tamar Manasseh (write-in)	11	0.00		
Catherine Brown D'Tycoon (write-in)	7	0.00		
Stephen Hodge (write-in)	7	0.00		
Ja'Mal Green (write-in)	6	0.00		
Daniel Fein (write-in)	3	0.00		
Richard Benedict Mayers (write-in)	2	0.00		
Robert A. Palmer (write-in)	1	0.00		
Total	556,844	100	523,804	100

2023 Chicago mayoral election
Candidate	General election		Runoff election	
Candidate	Votes	%	Votes	%
Brandon Johnson	122,093	21.63	319,481	52.16
Paul Vallas	185,743	32.90	293,033	47.84
Lori Lightfoot (incumbent)	94,890	16.81		
Chuy García	77,222	13.68		
Willie Wilson	51,567	9.13		
Ja'Mal Green	12,257	2.17		
Kam Buckner	11,092	1.96		
Sophia King	7,191	1.27		
Roderick Sawyer	2,440	0.43		
Write-ins	29	0.01		
Total	564,524	100.00	612,514	100.00
