= Kam Buckner =

American politician (born 1985)

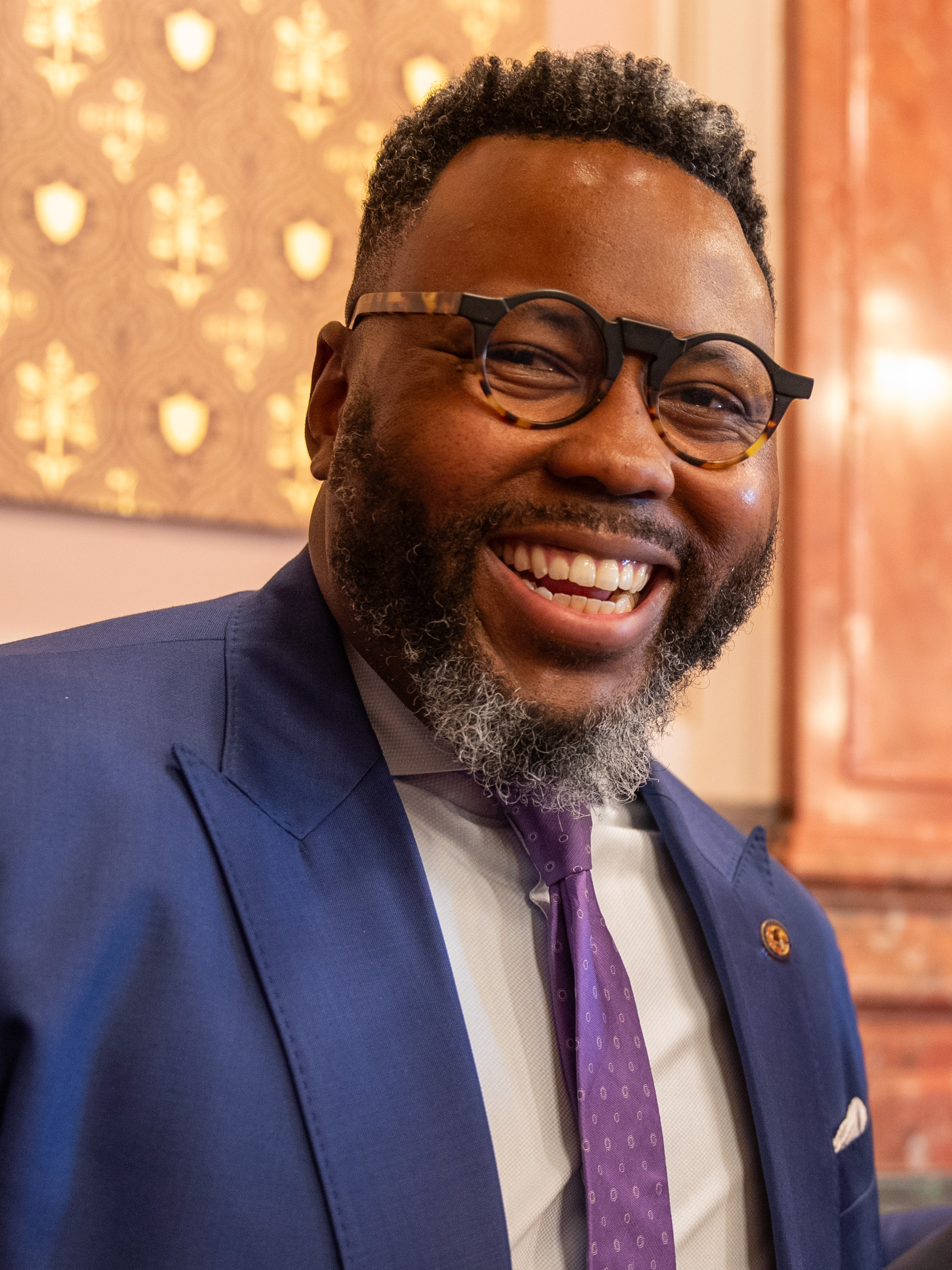
- Buckner in 2025

Speaker pro tempore of the Illinois House of Representatives
- Incumbent
- Assumed office January 10, 2025
- Preceded by: Jehan Gordon-Booth

Member of the Illinois House of Representatives from the 26th district
- Incumbent
- Assumed office January 18, 2019
- Preceded by: Christian Mitchell

Personal details
- Born: Kambium Elijah Buckner; May 12, 1985 (age 41) Chicago, Illinois, U.S.
- Party: Democratic
- Education: University of Illinois, Urbana-Champaign (BA); DePaul University (JD)
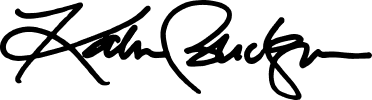
- Signature
- Football career

No. 59
- Positions: Offensive tackle, defensive line
- Class: 2007

Personal information
- Listed height: 6 ft 4 in (1.93 m)
- Listed weight: 280 lb (127 kg)

Career information
- High school: Morgan Park (Chicago, Illinois)
- College: Illinois Fighting Illini (2003–2007)

Kambium Elijah "Kam" Buckner (born May 12, 1985) is an American politician and attorney who serves as a Democratic member of the Illinois House of Representatives from the 26th district. The district, located entirely in Chicago, includes neighborhoods such as Bronzeville, Downtown, Gold Coast, and Hyde Park, among others. Buckner is the past chair of the Illinois House Black Caucus and Assistant Majority Leader for the House Democratic Caucus. He currently serves as Speaker Pro Tempore and budgeteer. In college, he played football for the Illinois Fighting Illini football team as an offensive tackle and defensive lineman.

He was a candidate in the 2023 Chicago mayoral election, but lost in the first round.

== Early life and education ==
Buckner was raised on the South Side of Chicago, and attended Morgan Park High School. He earned an undergraduate degree from the University of Illinois at Urbana–Champaign, where he played for the Illinois Fighting Illini football team and was a teammate of future NFL standouts Vontae Davis, Kelvin Hayden, Pierre Thomas, and Rashard Mendenhall. While at the University of Illinois he became a member of Omega Psi Phi. Buckner later earned a J.D. degree from the DePaul University College of Law.

== Early career ==
Buckner began his political career as an aide to Senator Dick Durbin in Washington D.C. from 2007 until 2012 and as an advisor to Mayor Mitch Landrieu in New Orleans from 2012 through 2013. From 2013 to 2015, he led government and neighborhood relations for the Chicago Cubs, helping drive the $575 million privately funded Wrigley Field renovation known as the 1060 Project. In 2015, he was appointed Executive Director of World Sport Chicago, a nonprofit that grew from the Chicago bid for the 2016 Summer Olympics.

On January 8, 2017, Governor Bruce Rauner appointed Buckner to the Board of Trustees of Chicago State University for a term expiring January 15, 2023.

Buckner has taught at University of Chicago and has been a contributor for The Hill and Crain's Chicago Business. Since 2015, he has also served as vice president of governmental affairs for Outfront Media.

== Illinois House of Representatives (2019-present) ==
On January 18, 2019, Buckner was appointed to the Illinois House of Representatives to succeed Christian Mitchell, who left to become a deputy governor in the J.B. Pritzker administration. In the 2020 election, he was re-elected unopposed to a two-year term. In December 2020, he was elected as chairman of the Illinois House Black Caucus. In 2022, he became Assistant Majority Leader in the Illinois House of Representatives.

In 2023, Edward Robert McClelland of Chicago magazine wrote that, during the 2021–2022 Illinois General Assembly, Buckner played a role in the passage of some of the "most significant legislation", citing his role in the passage of the SAFE-T Act and legislation which will transform the Chicago Board of Education into an elected school board. In 2023, A.D. Quig of the Chicago Tribune characterized Buckner as an active member of the Illinois House of Representatives, writing that Buckner,

Has jumped into some of Springfield’s hottest issues, serving as one of the lead negotiators on the state’s clean energy package and the SAFE-T Act, sponsoring legislation that requires serialization of so-called ghost-guns and that allows college athletes to be paid for use of their name and likeness, and backing legislation creating an elected school board in Chicago.

At the start of the 103rd General Assembly, incoming-Speaker Chris Welch named Buckner to serve as one of eight Assistant Majority Leaders for the seventy-eight member Democratic caucus. In 2024, he authored legislation to permit multi-family housing in zones previously exclusively zoned for single-family housing in the eight Illinois cities with a population over 100,000.

=== Committee assignments ===
As of July 3, 2022, Representative Buckner is a member of the following Illinois House committees:

- Executive Committee (HEXC)
- Higher Education Committee (HHED)
- Judiciary - Civil Committee (JHUA)
- Judiciary - Criminal Committee (HJUC)
  - Commercial & Property Subcommittee (HJUA-COMM)
- Tourism Committee (SHTO)

== 2023 Chicago mayoral campaign ==
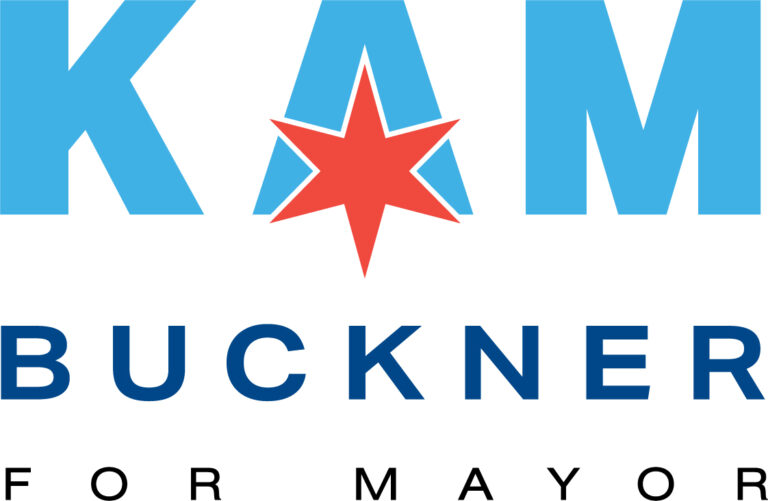
Kam Buckner mayoral campaign logo

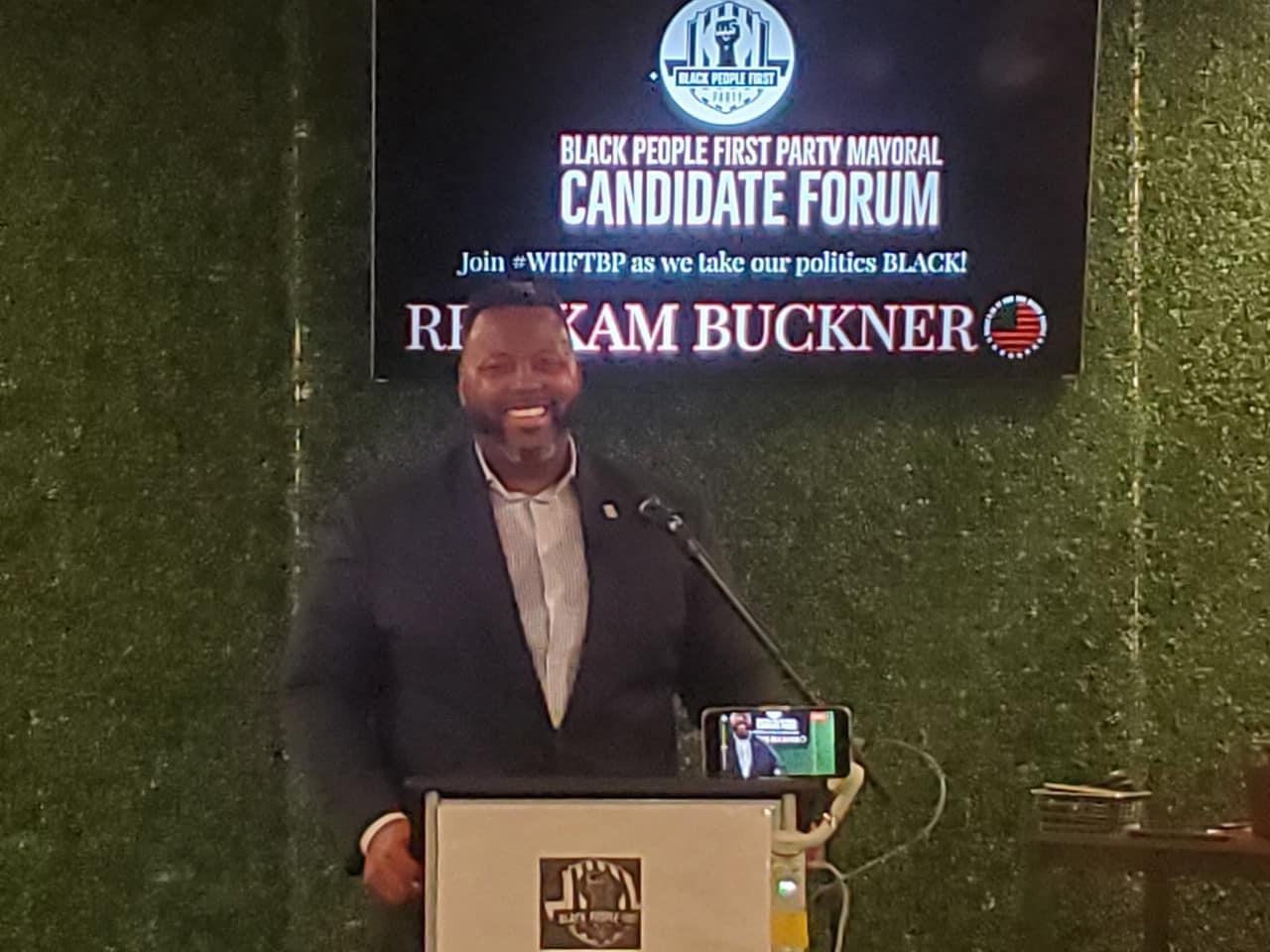
Buckner speaking at a mayoral candidate forum

Buckner (center) answering a question at a mayoral candidate forum, sitting between opponents Sophia King and Paul Vallas

On May 12, 2022, Buckner announced that he would run for mayor of Chicago in the 2023 election. He said that his campaign would focus on the issues of "public safety, public education, equitable economic development and sustainable budgeting." His campaign also placed great focus on issues related to public transportation.

In the initial round of the election, Buckner was defeated, placing seventh of nine candidates with just over 11,000 votes (1.96% of the election's overall vote).

Buckner endorsed Brandon Johnson in the election's runoff.

In September 2023, Buckner's mayoral campaign announcement video titled “Son of Chicago” was nominated for a Regional Emmy award in the category: Outstanding Achievement for Branded Content — Short Form Content. In the video, Buckner’s godson played a younger version of Buckner, who also appeared in the ad and wrote and delivered the voiceover.

== Political positions ==
Buckner regards himself to be a "pro-business progressive" Democrat.

In 2019, Buckner became an early supporter of Kamala Harris's presidential campaign. In 2024, he was elected as a delegate for Joe Biden and promptly endorsed Harris following Biden's withdrawal from the race. Buckner served as a Harris delegate at the 2024 Democratic National Convention in Chicago and also served as a national surrogate for her campaign.

=== Education ===
In his time in the Illinois General Assembly Buckner has constantly advocated for equitable funding of public schools across Illinois. Buckner authored HB 3917 to ensure that Chicago Public Schools receive the proper amount of funding based on the need of the students in the district. The legislation amends the evidence-based funding provisions of the School Code and provides that funds received by the Chicago school district for low-income, English learner, and special education resources must be distributed to every school of the district in the appropriate amount specified under the Essential Elements component of the funding formula.

He has been a proponent of Science, Technology, Engineering and Mathematics education in low-income neighborhoods and co-sponsored legislation to create an elected representative school board in Chicago.

=== Consumer protection ===
Buckner is the primary sponsor of House Bill 3920 that would make it illegal in Illinois for financial institutions to mail unsolicited, predatory, high-interest loan checks to consumers. This legislation is similar to the Unsolicited Loan Act of 2018, introduced in the U.S. Senate by Senators Doug Jones (D-AL), Tom Cotton (R-AR), and Jeff Merkley (D-OR).

=== Civil liberties ===
In July 2019, it came to light that the Chicago Police Department had been running secret background checks on members of the public who signed up to give comments at meetings of the Chicago Police Board. Police scoured lists of public speakers at board meetings and ran their names through department databases to look for arrest records, prison records, outstanding warrants, or sex offender registrations. In some cases, police even look at voter registration records and websites such as Facebook, Twitter, LinkedIn, or YouTube where speakers had profiles.

Police compiled this data into profiles on each speaker, many of whom were openly critical of the CPD. One woman profiled by the CPD had alleged to the Police Board that she had been sexually assaulted by a CPD officer years previously. Others were relatives of individuals who had been killed in shootings involving CPD officers. Records compiled by the Chicago Tribune show that this practice dated back to 2006 and led to secret background checks of more than 300 citizens—all without the knowledge or consent of those individuals.

In October 2019, Buckner filed HB 3925 that would make it illegal for law enforcement departments throughout the state to conduct background checks on citizens giving public comment at open meetings. The legislation would amend the Illinois Open Meetings Act to render such background checks a felony act.

Buckner was the House sponsor of Senate Bill 1599 which was sponsored by Elgie Sims in the Illinois Senate. It amended the Consumer Fraud and Deceptive Business Practices Act in relation to the dissemination of criminal record information. It made it an unlawful practice for a person or entity that publishes for profit a person's criminal record information to fail to correct an error in the individual's criminal record information. Governor J.B. Pritzker signed it into law on August 20, 2019, making it Public Act 101-0431.

Buckner has also been an outspoken opponent of Red Light and speed cameras, saying that they fundamentally run afoul of due process, the right to face one's accuser and privacy. He has also spoken out about the influx of these cameras in minority and poverty stricken neighborhoods and House Bill 3927, introduced by Buckner, amends the Illinois Vehicle Code and makes these automated traffic law enforcement systems illegal.

Buckner introduced House Bill 3584 in January 2019. It provides that victim impact statements received by Parole Boards shall be confidential and shall not be discoverable in litigation. It also amended the Open Parole Hearings Act to prevent the release of any material to the inmate, the inmate's attorney, any third party, or any other person that contains any information from the victim who has provided a victim impact statement, including the name and or address of the victim. Governor J.B. Pritzker signed it into law August 9, 2019, making it Public Act 101-0288.

=== Gun control ===
Buckner has been a vocal advocate for comprehensive gun control. He has used his personal history of experiencing and witnessing gun violence from a very young age to demand that mental health, quality of life, education and economic development be factors in any public policy efforts to eradicate gun violence.

=== Environment ===
In 2019, 2023 and 2024 Buckner was rated a 100% by the Illinois Environmental Council.

=== Protecting women and girls ===
In 2019 a Chicago Tribune special report revealed 55 unsolved killings of women in the Chicago area and a great number of missing women. The Illinois State Police came under fire for the massive backlog in processing DNA in murder cases and the FBI was asked to investigate any correlation between the reported occurrences. Buckner took to the floor of the Illinois General Assembly in May 2019 to address the disappearance of 3 Chicago women, 2 of whom were pregnant and later found murdered. In October 2019, Buckner authored and introduced House Bill 3932 which would create the Task Force on Missing and Murdered Chicago Women Act.

== Personal life ==
Buckner comes from a musical family. His father was the lead singer in a 1970s soul group that was signed to Hugh Hefner's Playboy Records. He is a cousin of singer and actress Jennifer Hudson and the Staples Singers. Buckner was arrested and pled guilty to driving under the influence (DUI) in 2010. In 2019, he was arrested for DUI and pled guilty. He was sentenced to 12 months of conditional discharge.

Buckner is the co-host of a weekly podcast titled famILLy about Fighting Illini football with former Illinois Quarterback Juice Williams; a part of Evan Turner and Andre Iguodala's Beyond the Big Ten network of podcasts.

Buckner is married to Bernardette Salgado-Buckner, and they have a son.

== Electoral history ==
=== State representative ===
2020 Illinois House of Representatives 26th district Democratic primary
Party	Candidate	Votes	%
Democratic	Kam Buckner (incumbent)	17,378	100.00
Total votes		17,378	100.00

2020 Illinois House of Representatives 26th district general election
Party	Candidate	Votes	%
Democratic	Kam Buckner (incumbent)	41,804	100
Write-in		1	0.00
Total votes		41,805	100.00

2022 Illinois House of Representatives 26th district Democratic primary
Party	Candidate	Votes	%
Democratic	Kam Buckner (incumbent)	10,531	100.00
Total votes		10,531	100.00

2022 Illinois House of Representatives 26th district general election
Party	Candidate	Votes	%
Democratic	Kam Buckner (incumbent)	24,017	100.00
Total votes		24,017	100.00

=== Mayor ===
2023 Chicago mayoral election
Candidate	General election		Runoff election	
Candidate	Votes	%	Votes	%
Brandon Johnson	122,093	21.63	319,481	52.16
Paul Vallas	185,743	32.90	293,033	47.84
Lori Lightfoot (incumbent)	94,890	16.81		
Chuy García	77,222	13.68		
Willie Wilson	51,567	9.13		
Ja'Mal Green	12,257	2.17		
Kam Buckner	11,092	1.96		
Sophia King	7,191	1.27		
Roderick Sawyer	2,440	0.43		
Write-ins	29	0.00		
Total	564,524	100.00	612,514	100.00

Illinois House of Representatives
Preceded by Jehan Gordon-Booth	Speaker pro tempore of the Illinois House of Representatives; 2025–present	Incumbent
