= The Gazette (Chicago) =

Monthly newspaper in Chicago

Gazette Chicago
- Type: Monthly newspaper, community journalism
- Format: Tabloid
- Owner: Mark J. Valentino
- Publisher: Mark J. Valentino
- Associate editor: William S. Bike
- Photo editor: Christopher Valentino
- Staff writers: Andrew Adams, Patrick Butler, Gina Catalano, Claire Cowley, Nawal Dairi, Dolly Duplantier, Jake Ekdahl, Sheila Elliot, Susan Fong, Rodrigo Hernandez, Eva Hofmann, Lisa R. Jenkins, Kayla Kirshenbaum, Jane Lawicki, Madeline Makoul, Joseland Nixon, Mara Perlow, Rick Romano, Amy Rothblatt, Ivette Sandoval, Jennifer Santoyo, Susan S. Stevens, Igor Stuenkov, Gabriella Valentino, Monica Walk, Marie Balice Ward, David Warren, Peter Winslow, Nathan Worcester
- Founded: 1983
- Headquarters: 1335 W. Harrison St, Chicago, IL 60607
- Circulation: 17,000

Gazette Chicago (formerly the Near West Gazette and then Near West/ South Gazette) is a monthly newspaper covering the Near West/Tri-Taylor, University Village, West Loop, South Loop, West Haven, Bridgeport/Armour Square, Chinatown, Bronzeville, West Town, and Heart of Chicago communities of Chicago, Illinois, USA. Its circulation is 17,000. It ceased circulation on April 1, 2024.

== History ==
In 1983, native Chicago Near West Sider Mark J. Valentino at age 24 started the Near West Gazette with no financial backing other than his own small savings. The Near West Side neighborhood had had no community publication since 1971. Editor and Publisher Valentino added business partner and Associate Editor William S. Bike to the publication, and Gazette Chicago was underway.

== Content ==
Gazette Chicago is one of the few independently owned publications in Chicago and is a vehicle that brings the diverse neighborhoods it covers together, despite their close proximity. These are communities of African-Americans, Hispanic-Americans, Chinese-Americans, Irish-Americans, Italian-Americans, Croatian-Americans, Polish-Americans, Lithuanian-Americans, and well-to-do professionals and gentrifiers who would have few bridges to each other without the Gazette, which covers all their news. In recognition of this, Valentino in 1997 received the Bernadine C. Washington Award conferred by the Chicago Commission on Human Relations for Gazette Chicago's work in improving human relations in Chicago and building bridges among communities. The Chicago City Council that year also passed a resolution honoring Gazette Chicago for building bridges among communities.

Unlike many other media, Gazette Chicago covers every candidate in local races, whether they are considered "legitimate" or not by the citywide media. As a result, underfunded candidates, particularly African-American and Hispanic candidates, get as much and as balanced coverage as wealthier candidates.

Gazette Chicago since 1993 has won more than 70 local, national, and even international journalism awards.

Gazette Chicago is located in Chicago, IL, (312) 243-4288, www.gazettechicago.com, info@gazettechicago.com.
