= Gery Chico =

American politician and lawyer

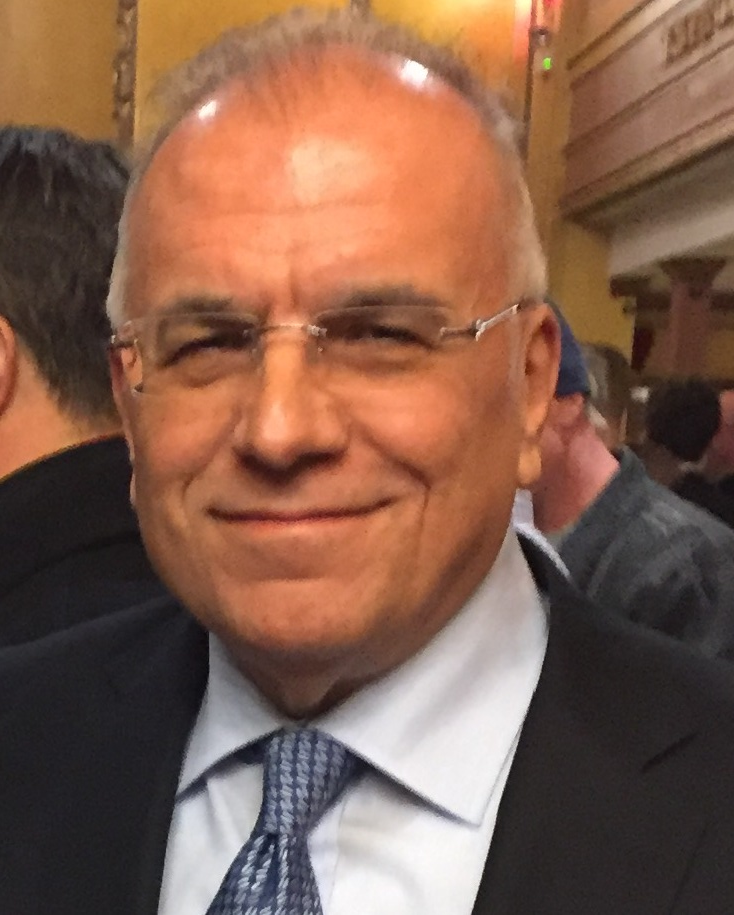
- Chico in 2018

Chair of the Illinois State Board of Education
- In office June 7, 2011 – January 12, 2015
- Governor: Pat Quinn
- Preceded by: Jesse Ruiz
- Succeeded by: James Meeks

President of the Chicago Park District Board of Commissioners
- In office October 2007 – March 2010
- Appointed by: Richard Daley
- Succeeded by: Bryan Traubert

President of the Chicago Board of Education^{A}
- In office 1995–2001
- Preceded by: D. Sharon Grant
- Succeeded by: Michael Scott Sr.

Personal details
- Born: August 24, 1956 (age 70) Chicago, Illinois, U.S.
- Party: Democratic
- Education: University of Illinois, Urbana-Champaign; University of Illinois, Chicago (BA); Loyola University Chicago (JD)

Gery J. Chico (/ˈɡɛri ˈtʃiːkoʊ/ GHERR-ee CHEE-koh; born August 24, 1956) is an American politician, lawyer, public official and former Democratic primary candidate to become the U.S. Senator from Illinois.

Chico served as the Chief of Staff to Mayor Richard M. Daley from 1992 to 1995, and board president of the Chicago Public Schools from 1995 to 2001. He was named Outstanding School Board President by the Illinois State Board of Education in 1997. From 2007 to 2010, he was board president of the Chicago Park District, and in 2010 he was board president of the City Colleges of Chicago. On June 7, 2011, Chico was named Chairman of the Illinois State Board of Education by Illinois Governor Pat Quinn.

Chico ran for Mayor of Chicago in the 2011 election, but was defeated by Rahm Emanuel. In late 2018, Chico declared a second bid for mayor in the 2019 election. After losing in the first round, he endorsed Lori Lightfoot.

== Early life and education ==
Gery Chico was born on August 24, 1956, to a Mexican-American father, Jesse, and a Greek-Lithuanian mother, Jacqueline (née Kopulos). With his two younger brothers, he grew up in Chicago's McKinley Park neighborhood. His mother also worked as a secretary at the University of Illinois at Chicago College of Dentistry. Chico attended a now-closed parochial school, Our Lady of Good Counsel Catholic Elementary School at 35th and Hermitage, where he headed the altar boys and patrol boys, and also played baseball for two years. A hip injury kept him in a wheelchair during his freshman year at Thomas Kelly High School.

Chico pursued a pre-medical degree at the University of Illinois at Urbana–Champaign, but after his sophomore year he transferred to the University of Illinois at Chicago. A political science major, he volunteered in the 11th Ward. He later secured an externship in the city's Department of Planning during his senior year, and he worked there from 1977 to 1980. He received his bachelor's degree in 1978. From 1980 to 1987, he worked for the City Council Finance Committee. Finance Committee chair Alderman Edward M. Burke promoted Chico to research manager, and he became senior research assistant for the Department of Planning and Economic Development. At that time, he took night classes at the Loyola University Chicago School of Law. He earned his J.D. degree in 1985 and became a member of the Loyola Law Review.

Chico has been married twice; his first wife was Jeryl Minow, with whom he had three daughters. He is currently married to Sunny Penedo Chico, who has a son and daughter from a previous marriage. A former U.S. Department of Education employee, Sunny runs a consulting firm that focuses on, among others, tutoring services and curriculum advice.

== Legal career ==
Chico began working as an associate of the Chicago-based law firm Sidley Austin in 1987, and served as General Counsel to the Chicago Development Council, a real estate development association. He left the firm in 1991 to become the Deputy Chief of Staff for Mayor Richard M. Daley, but he later returned as partner in 1995 and 1996, leading the firm's practice related to state and local government.

In 1996, Chico left Sidley & Austin to become a senior partner of Altheimer & Gray. Oscar D’Angelo, a friend of Daley and a former Altheimer partner, suggested to the firm’s managing partner that the firm hire Chico. In 2000, just four years later, at age 44, Chico became chairman of Altheimer. In 2002, the firm gave hundreds of thousands of dollars to Governor Rod Blagojevich and Attorney General Lisa Madigan's campaigns. In 2003, while Chico was chairman and simultaneously running for the US Senate, Altheimer became insolvent and dissolved. Some partners blamed the bankruptcy on poor management by Chico, while an attorney who sat on two financial committees blamed an economic downturn.

Chico also served as Special Counsel to Arnstein & Lehr in 2003 and 2004. In 2004, Chico, along with Planning Department colleague Marcus Nunes, formed the general practice law firm Chico & Nunes, which lobbies for clients seeking government business.

== Chief of Staff to Chicago Mayor Richard M. Daley ==
In 1991, Chico was a Deputy Chief of Staff for Mayor Richard M. Daley. He coordinated efforts to drain freight tunnels that were flooded with water from the Chicago River. Chico was later promoted to Chief of Staff, a position he held from 1992 to 1995. As part of his duties, he oversaw the completion of the International Terminal of O'Hare International Airport, preparations for the 1994 FIFA World Cup, and the construction of new schools. Along with Budget Director Paul Vallas, Chico helped add 1,000 officers to the police force and improved neighborhoods throughout the city through a program called Neighborhoods Alive.

== Chicago Public Schools board ==
In 1995, the Illinois state legislature passed the Chicago School Reform Act, which gave the Mayor of Chicago unprecedented new control over Chicago Public Schools. Daley asked Chico to become the CEO, but Chico declined because he was resuming his law career. Chico instead recommended that Daley appoint colleague Paul Vallas as CEO, and Chico was named chairman of the School Reform Board of Trustees, which was renamed the "President of the Chicago Board of Education" in 1999 (the title which the board had originally held before 1995). In 1997 Chico was named Outstanding School Board President by the Illinois State Board of Education for his reforms in education and fiscal policies.

Chico was responsible for efforts to preserve and restore hundreds of murals in the public schools, which had been commissioned by President Franklin D. Roosevelt during the Progressive and New Deal eras. They had since been hidden under layers of dirt and paint. Under his administration, CPS appointed an Arts Education Task Force and a Bureau of Cultural Arts.

Chico resigned as President of the Chicago Board of Education in 2001. His departure was considered sudden, and came after a number of failing standardized testing scores eliminated the improvements to test scores that had been experienced in the previous two years. Soon after his departure, Paul Vallas also announced his resignation. Chico was succeeded in this office by Michael W. Scott.

== 2004 campaign for U.S. Senate ==
In 2004, Chico ran for the Democratic nomination to succeed retiring Republican U.S. Senator Peter Fitzgerald. He was the first Democrat to declare his candidacy, doing so on July 30, 2002, during a rally with Hispanic leaders. His Senate committee preferences included education, transportation, and judiciary. He also criticized the Bipartisan Campaign Reform Act and the No Child Left Behind Act, but supported gay marriage, abortion rights, stem cell research, the death penalty, and universal healthcare. Chico was the only candidate who supported gay marriage out of all seven Democrats and eight Republicans. Then-State Senator Barack Obama ultimately won the nomination over six other candidates including Chico.

== Chicago Park District board ==
In October 2007, Mayor Daley appointed Chico as president of the Chicago Park District Board of Commissioners. Chico supported the construction of a new soccer field in Lincoln Park despite opposition from local residents. In 2010, he stepped down.

== City Colleges of Chicago board ==
In March 2010, Mayor Daley nominated Chico as chairman of the board of trustees of the City Colleges of Chicago and the board elected Chico chairman. Along with Chancellor Cheryl Hyman, Chico reformed the City Colleges budget by laying off 225 employees, removing unfilled jobs, and reducing executive spending to increase spending on technology and training for students. Furthermore, Chico and Hyman reduced taxation on property for two straight years, and cancelled nursing programs. He resigned 8 months later to run for Mayor of Chicago.

== 2011 campaign for mayor of Chicago ==
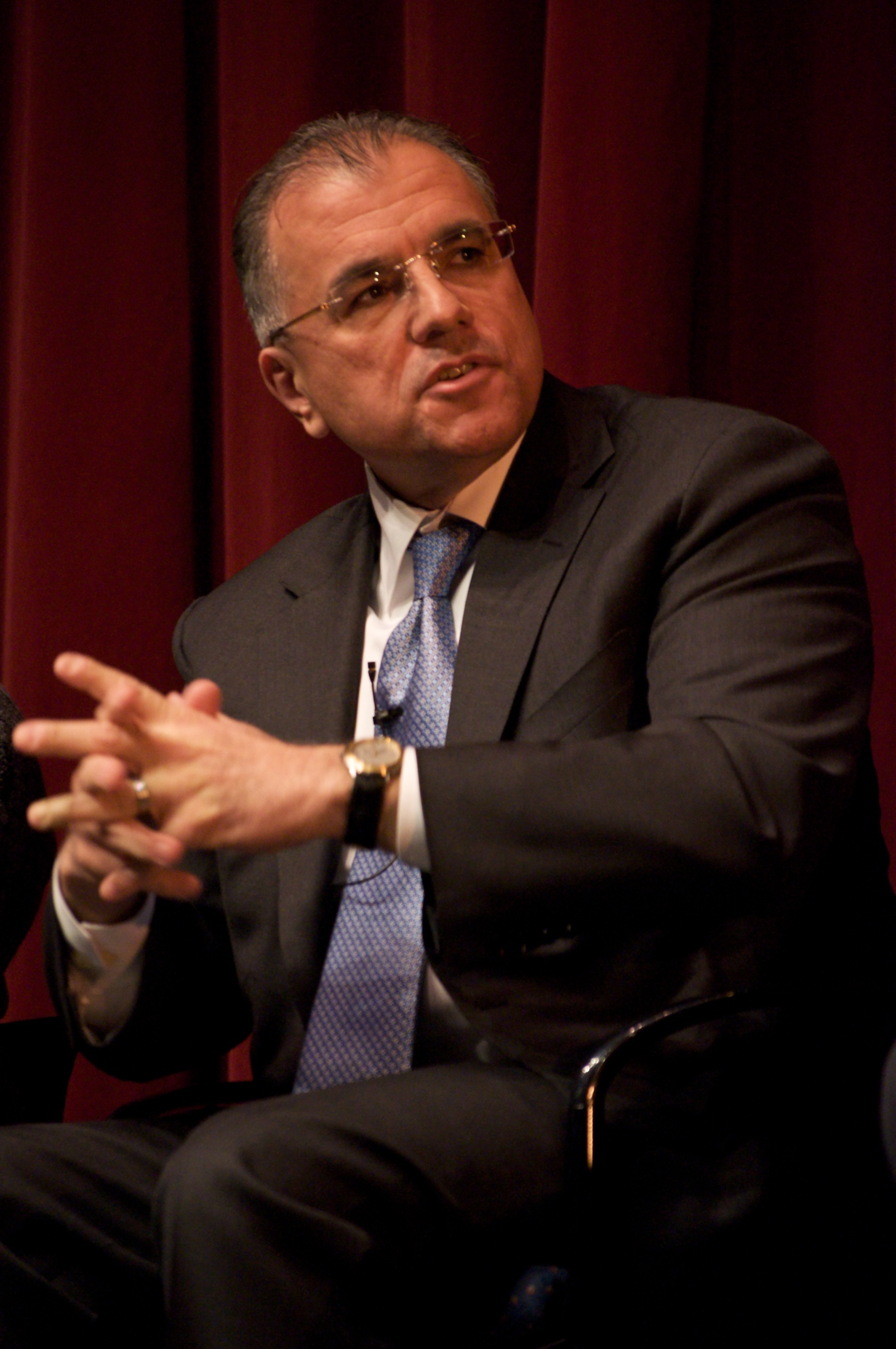
Chico participating in a 2011 mayoral candidate debate

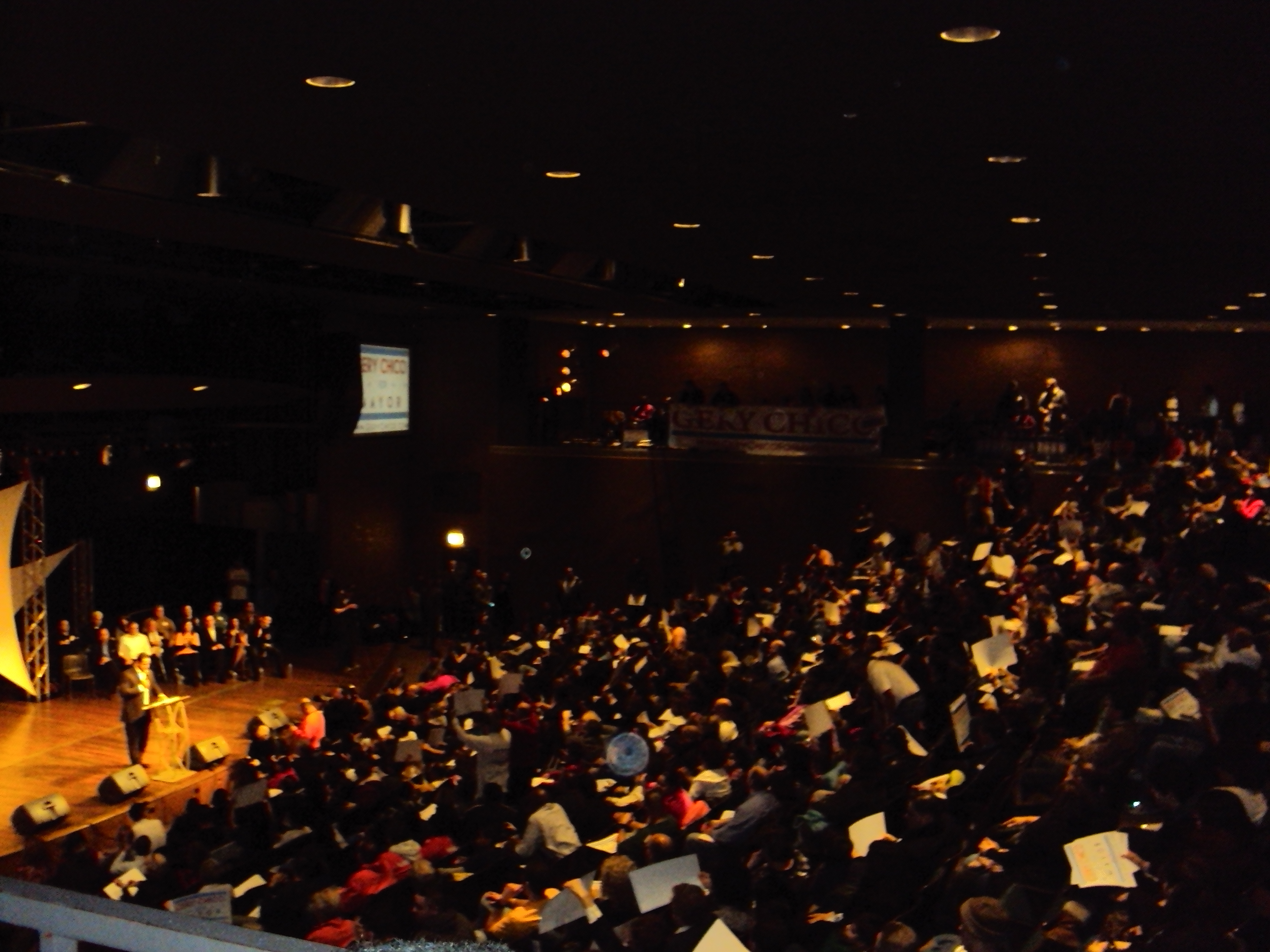
A pre-election rally at Roberto Clemente High School.

On September 27, 2010, Chico announced that he would run for mayor of Chicago in 2011. He was one of six candidates on the ballot.

Rahm Emanuel was considered to be the leading candidate before the election. Chico was considered "the rival with the best chance of forcing him into a runoff".

Chico positioned himself as a business candidate with a Latino identity. He sought to portray himself as a candidate who understood the city better than frontrunner Rahm Emanuel. He touted his experience, particularly his tenure as president of the school board.

Chico advertised his Latino background, his identity as the son of an immigrant father, his education in the Chicago Public Schools system. He also contrasted his South Side upbringing to Emanuel's upbringing in the suburban North Shore.

In seeking the Hispanic vote, he proved to have a lead over the race's other Hispanic candidate, Miguel del Valle. Chico received significant support from the city's Hispanic community, even receiving endorsements from leading members such as congressman Luis Gutierrez.

Chico raised nearly $4.4 million in campaign funds. This was the second-greatest amount any candidate raised, however it was still only less than one-third of the $15 million in campaign funds that Emanuel was able to procure. Chico received most of his money from personal and corporate donations. However, he also had the greatest union support financial contribution to his campaign committee of any candidate, receiving $188,000 from municipal unions, including the Chicago Firefighters Union and the Fraternal Order of Police.

Chico was backed by many of the city's establishment Democrats, such as alderman Edward M. Burke.

In regards to schools, Chico wanted to negotiate with the Chicago Teachers Union for both a lengthened school day and school year. He opposed an elected school board. He touted his experience leading the school board as qualifications which made him the best fit candidate to address problems with the Chicago Public Schools.

Chico pledged to hire 2,000 police officers but did not offer specifics on how he would raise the funds. He opposed making the school board an elected body, and he favored extending the school day and school year. Chico picked up endorsements from unions that represented, among others, police officers, firefighters, laborers, painters, operating engineers, iron workers, roofers, and sheet metal workers.

Chico attacked Rahm Emanuel's proposal to lower the sales tax and increase the service tax. He derided Emanuel's proposed service tax increase the "Rahm tax", and discounted Emanuel's claim that this increase would be offset the by his proposed sales tax decrease. He sought to garner additional media attention with his "Rahm tax" attacks, but to little avail.

In the results of the election on February 22, Emanuel's 55% support dwarfed Chico's 24% support. Chico placed second. Chico won in 10 of Chicago's 50 wards, while Emanuel won 40. The campaign's communications director claimed that controversy over Emanuel's eligibility to run for mayor may have diverted the focus of the press away from the other candidates. After the election, Chico remained involved in the runoff elections for other city offices, endorsing a candidate for 25th Ward alderman.

== State Board of Education ==
From June 2011 through January 2015, Chico served as chair of the Illinois State Board of Education.

Chico was nominated by Governor Pat Quinn to be chairman of the Illinois State Board of Education in June 2011. His confirmation was delayed as a result of questions regarding his ties to the Save-A-Life Foundation, a failed charity that was undergoing investigation by Illinois Attorney General Lisa Madigan’s office.

== 2019 campaign for mayor of Chicago ==
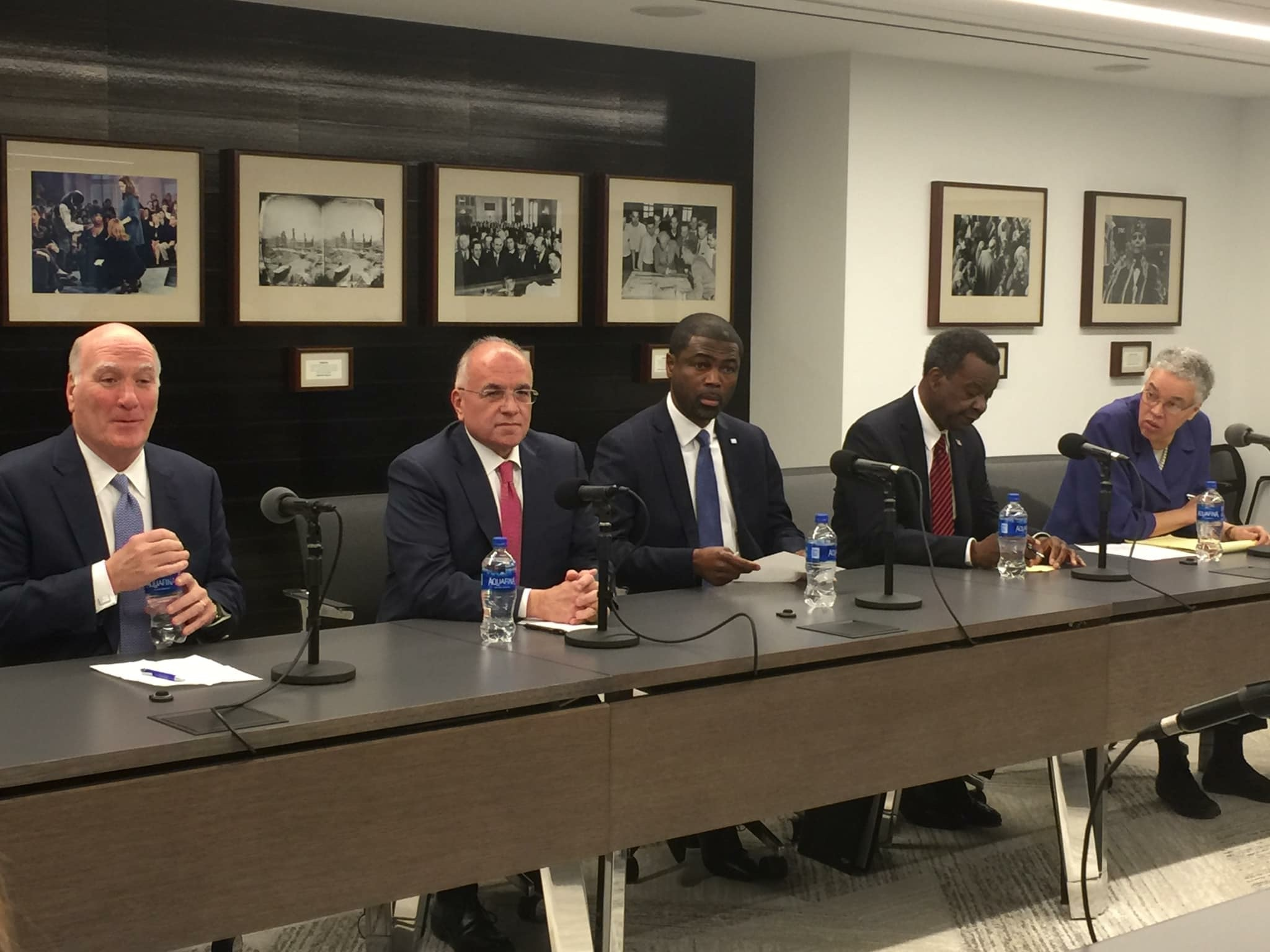
Mayoral candidates participate in a 2019 forum hosted by the Chicago Tribune; L-R: William M. Daley, Chico, La Shawn Ford, Willie Wilson, and Toni Preckwinkle

Chico ran for mayor again in the 2019 Chicago mayoral election.

During his candidacy, Chico was perceived to be seeking strong support from Hispanic voters. In the end, he received the second-highest support among Hispanic voters of any candidate in the first round, placing behind Susana Mendoza. However, Hispanic voter turnout was low in the election.

Chico was one of four mayoral candidates (alongside Bill Daley, Susana Mendoza, and Toni Preckwinkle) that had political ties to Alderman Edward M. Burke, whose corruption scandal upended the race for mayor. Chico was particularly tied to Burke, having received his endorsement in the mayoral election. Chico made efforts to distance himself from Burke.

Chico touted his experience. He staked much of his candidacy upon his record at Chicago Public Schools and Chicago City Colleges. Chico placed eighth of fourteen candidates, with 6.20% of the vote. After failing to advance to the runoff, Chico endorsed Lori Lightfoot.

== Subsequent activities ==
In mid-2019, Chico became the board chairman of Local Initiatives Support Corporation Chicago, a nonprofit seeking to boost underserved neighborhoods through grants, loans, and by providing support to community organizations.

== Electoral history ==
2004 United States Senate election in Illinois Democratic primary
Party	Candidate	Votes	%
Democratic	Barack Obama	655,923	52.8%
Democratic	Daniel W. Hynes	294,717	23.7%
Democratic	M. Blair Hull	134,453	10.8%
Democratic	Maria Pappas	74,987	6.0%
Democratic	Gery Chico	53,433	4.3%
Democratic	Nancy Skinner	16,098	1.3%
Democratic	Joyce Washington	13,375	1.1%
Democratic	Estella Johnson-Hunt (write-in)	10	0.0%
Total votes		1,242,996	100.0%

2011 Chicago mayoral election
Party	Candidate	Votes	%
Nonpartisan	Rahm Emanuel	326,331	55.27
Nonpartisan	Gery J. Chico	141,228	23.92
Nonpartisan	Miguel del Valle	54,689	9.26
Nonpartisan	Carol Moseley Braun	53,062	8.99
Nonpartisan	Patricia Van Pelt Watkins	9,704	1.64
Nonpartisan	William Walls, III	5,343	0.90
Write-in	Tommy Hanson	9	0.00
Write-in	John C. Hawkins	8	0.00
Write-in	“Fredrick” “Frederick” “Fred” “F.” K. White	6	0.00
Write-in	Alfredo Castillo	4	0.00
Write-in	John Hu	4	0.00
Write-in	Alex George (AG)	3	0.00
Turnout		590,391	41.99

2019 Chicago mayoral election
Candidate	General Election		Runoff Election	
Candidate	Votes	%	Votes	%
Lori Lightfoot	97,667	17.54	386,039	73.70
Toni Preckwinkle	89,343	16.04	137,765	26.30
William Daley	82,294	14.78		
Willie Wilson	59,072	10.61		
Susana Mendoza	50,373	9.05		
Amara Enyia	44,589	8.00		
Jerry Joyce	40,099	7.20		
Gery Chico	34,521	6.20		
Paul Vallas	30,236	5.43		
Garry McCarthy	14,784	2.66		
La Shawn K. Ford	5,606	1.01		
Robert "Bob" Fioretti	4,302	0.77		
John Kolzar	2,349	0.42		
Neal Sales-Griffin	1,523	0.27		
Write-ins	86	0.02		
Total	556,844	100	523,804	100

== Notes ==
A. Position was known as "chairman of the Chicago School Reform Board of Trustees" from 1995 through 1999, and has been known as "president of the Chicago Board of Education" since 1999
