= Miguel del Valle =

American politician (born 1951)

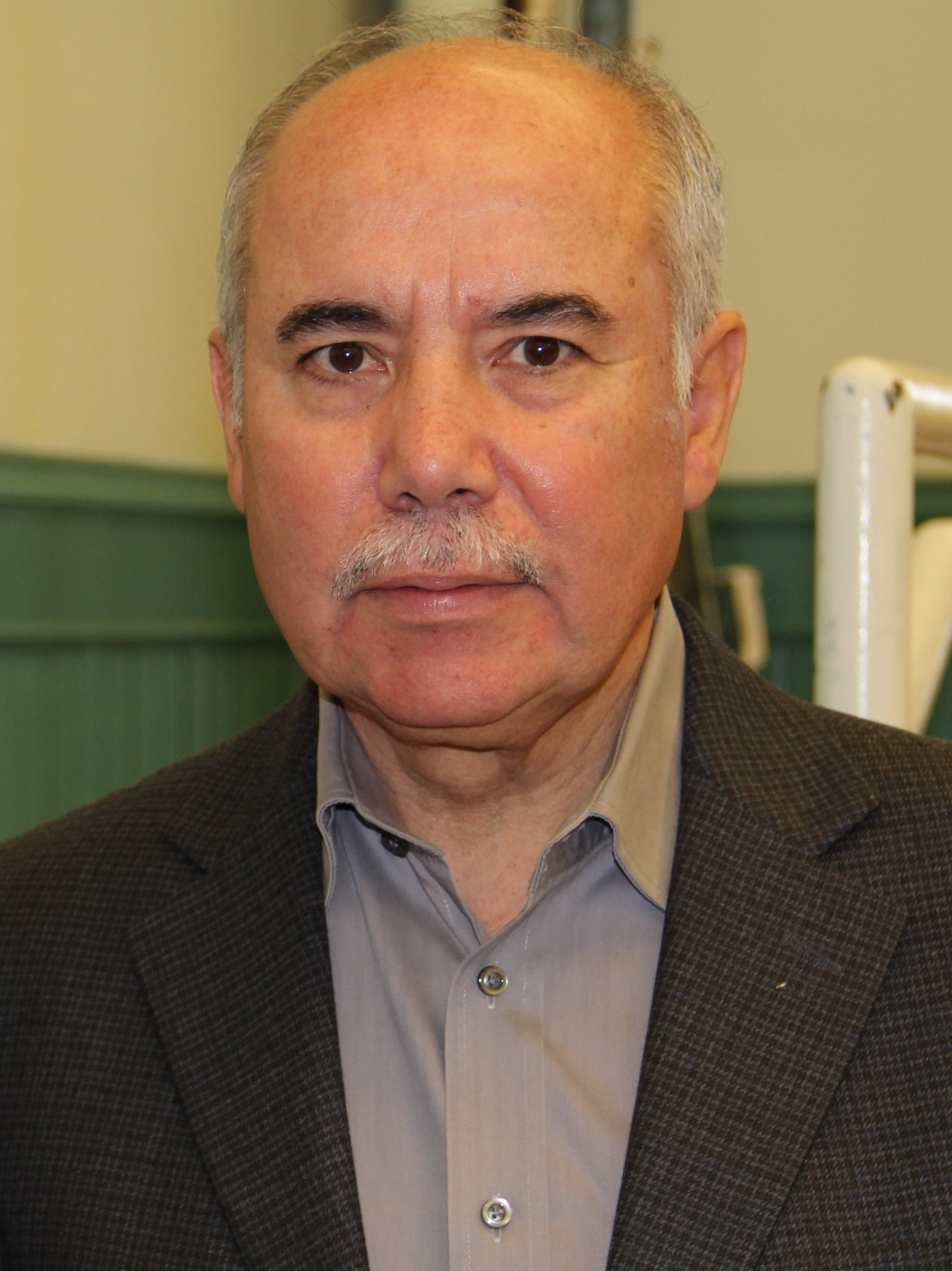
- del Valle in 2011

President of the Chicago Board of Education
- In office June 26, 2019 – June 30, 2023
- Appointed by: Lori Lightfoot
- Preceded by: Frank M. Clark
- Succeeded by: Jianan Shi

City Clerk of Chicago
- In office December 1, 2006 – May 16, 2011
- Preceded by: James Laski
- Succeeded by: Susana Mendoza

Member of the Illinois Senate from the 2nd district
- In office 1987–2006
- Preceded by: Edward Nedza
- Succeeded by: William Delgado

Personal details
- Born: July 24, 1951 (age 75) Vega Baja, Puerto Rico
- Party: Democratic
- Spouse: Lupe del Valle
- Children: 3 sons 1 daughter
- Education: Northeastern Illinois University (BA, MA)
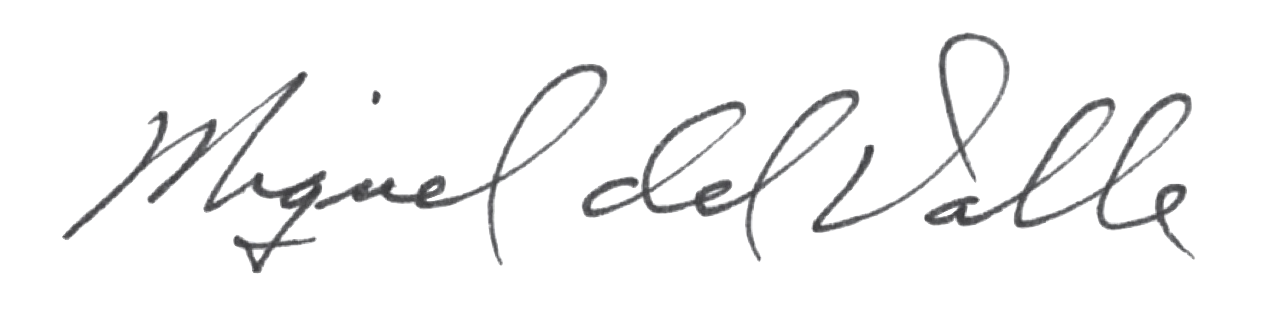
- Signature

Miguel del Valle (born July 24, 1951) is an American politician who has served in various roles in municipal and state government in Chicago. He was elected to the Illinois Senate in 1987, becoming the first Hispanic member of the body, and served until 2006. He was appointed to fill a vacancy for Chicago City Clerk by Mayor Richard M. Daley in 2006, and won re-election to a full term in 2007. He ran for Mayor of Chicago in the 2011 election, placing third with 9.3% of the vote. In 2019, he was appointed as president of the Chicago Board of Education by Mayor Lori Lightfoot and served until June 2023.

== Personal life and early career ==
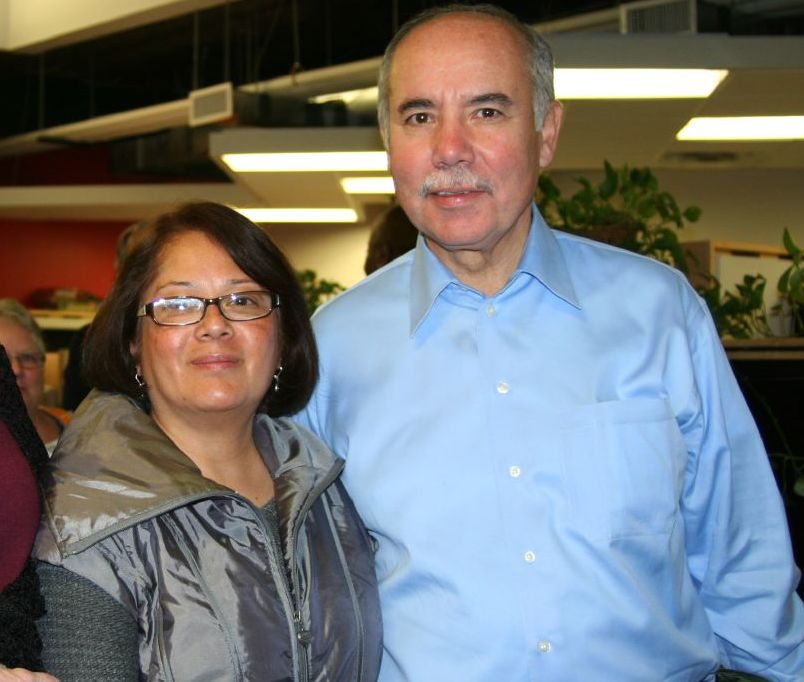
de Valle with his wife Lupe in 2009

Del Valle was born in Puerto Rico and was brought to Chicago at the age of four by his parents. He grew up in the predominantly working class Latina/o West Town and Humboldt Park neighborhoods of Chicago. After graduating from Tuley High School (now Roberto Clemente Community Academy) in 1969, he went on to Northeastern Illinois University. At Northeastern del Valle was a student organizer, joining the Union for Puerto Rican Students and serving as treasurer. He was also President of the Spanish Action Youth Committee during his early college days.

After earning a bachelor's and a master's degree in Education and Guidance from Northeastern, del Valle served as Unit Director of the Barreto Boys & Girls Club and then as Executive Director of the Association House, a non-profit organization providing social services and educational programs on Chicago's northwest side. During his time as Executive Director of the Association House, del Valle was heralded by the Chicago Tribune as an "emerging young leader." In 1982, after organizing meetings, rallies, and lobbying Chicago's Chicago City Council, del Valle was successful in re-instating city funding for Association House's successful jobs program for unemployed youth.

Del Valle is married to Lupe, and has four children: Miguel Jr., Ivan, Esteban, and Vanessa.

== Senate career ==
In 1987, del Valle was elected the first Hispanic Senator in the Illinois General Assembly after he defeated Edward Nedza in the Democratic primary. He was the Assistant Majority Leader in the Illinois Senate, and he was the first Latino to hold that position. He served as an outspoken advocate for Latino representation in the legislative and judicial branches of government. He was the Co-Chair of the Illinois Legislative Latino Caucus and was the first Latino member of the Illinois Legislative Black Caucus. His leadership in redistricting cases in 1981, 1991, and 2001 led to the creation of Latino majority districts on the city, county, and state levels.

Del Valle sponsored legislation to protect homeowners by stopping the forgery of quitclaim deeds which is the process of transferring the title or deed of property to another individual or company. He has also sponsored legislation to provide harsher punishment for ATM crimes; provide Illinois with more Early Childhood Teachers; provide comprehensive health coverage for every child in Illinois; and increase funding for Advanced Placement courses in Illinois high schools.

Del Valle is the founder of the Illinois Association of Hispanic State Employees (IAHSE). He is the co-founder of several Latino organizations, including the Illinois Latino Advisory Council on Higher Education (ILACHE); the Alliance of Latinos and Jews; and the Illinois Hispanic Democratic Council (IHDC). He also developed the annual Department of Children and Family Services Hispanic Families Conference.

Del Valle was the Vice-Chairman of the Education Committee, Co-Chairman of the Senate Select Committee on Education Funding Reform and the Illinois Legislative Latino Caucus. He also served on the Senate Executive Committee, the Senate Labor Committee, and the Higher Education Committee.

In the 2006 Illinois primary elections, Del Valle received local media attention for his support of Ramon Ocasio III for judge over the Cook County Democratic Party-endorsed candidate, Ed Lechowicz, son of former Cook County Commissioner and Illinois State Senator Ted Lechowicz. Del Valle, who sponsored legislation to create the subcircuit system, stated that the system was created to give women and minorities the opportunity to serve on the bench.

Del Valle was the first Latino male elected to the Illinois Democratic State Central Committee, where he served a four-year term.

In 2008, del Valle served as an elected Obama delegate at the Democratic National Convention in Denver, where he had a speaking role.

Del Valle established the Miguel del Valle Youth Leadership Development Foundation, which raised and distributed over $200,000 in support of numerous youth services.

== City clerk ==
In 2006, Miguel del Valle was appointed City Clerk of Chicago by Mayor Richard M. Daley after the previous clerk, James Laski, was indicted on federal charges. Del Valle won a citywide election to the post in 2007, becoming the first Latino elected to the Chicago City Clerk's office.

As city clerk, del Valle's office is responsible for maintaining official city government records, distributing approximately 1.3 million vehicle stickers and residential parking permits, and issuing city business licenses.

Clerk del Valle is focused on bringing more efficiency and visibility to city clerk services by providing greater access to public records, including web casting of City Council meetings, expanding community outreach programs, modernizing operations to expedite the sale of dog registrations, city stickers and residential parking.

Significant City Council transparency efforts include posting nearly 700,000 pages of searchable City Council records to the City Clerk website, www.ChiCityClerk.com. This includes every ordinance passed since 1981, the Byrne Administration, as well as city budgets and Mayoral Executive orders going back nearly 30 years. In addition, for the first time ever, City Council meetings can be watched live or on demand via a City Council video archive on the City Clerk website, www.ChiCityClerk.com.

== Campaign for mayor ==
After Mayor Daley announced that he would not run for another term, del Valle was the first to declare his candidacy in the 2011 Chicago mayoral election. He was the first candidate to air a campaign ad on television, the first to have a website and Facebook page, and the first (and only) candidate to publicly declare he would not accept campaign contributions from companies that do business with the city.

Del Valle ran a grassroots campaign, which was energetic, but underfunded. Del Valle ran as a reformer, taking stands on issues such as campaign finance reform and advocating increased powers for the city's inspector general. Del Valle's campaign strategy focused on the city's neighborhoods, and sought to portray him as an individual who would foster ground-up change focused on working with and working in the city's communities. He hoped to mobilize enough progressives across the city to participate in his campaign to allow him to run successfully despite having a low budget. He also sought to project a "man of the people" image, emphasizing his Latino identity and his ties to the city. He also touted his record from his tenure as a state senator.

On the issue of schools, del Valle supported an eventual transition to an elected school board with districts, a stance which contrasted with Gery Chico, Rahm Emanuel, and Carol Moseley Braun's opposition to an elected school board. He supported lengthening both the school day and school year. He also supported negotiating with the Chicago Teachers Union a stronger system for teacher evaluation. Of the top four candidates running, his stances were the most in-line with those of the Chicago Teachers Union.

While del Valle sought to garner Latino support, he ran at a deficit to fellow Hispanic candidate Gery Chico in garnering Latino support. However, he received the endorsements Hispanic politicians such as Rey Colón, William Delgado, Jesús "Chuy" García, Elizabeth Hernandez, Edwin Reyes, and Cynthia Soto.

Del Valle also won the endorsements of Robyn Gabel, Northside Democracy for America and Independent Voters of Illinois-Independent Precinct Organization.

Del Valle's campaign lacked funds. He was only able to raise less than $132,000 in donations. He was only able to produce single televised advertisement campaign.

Despite his efforts, the grassroots support his campaign strategy had been counting on failed to materialize.

In the election he came in third in a field of six, with about nine percent of the vote. In his concession speech he promised to continue to push for a progressive agenda, though he would soon leave office as City Clerk.

== Illinois Commerce Commission ==
Del Valle was also appointed by Illinois Governor Pat Quinn on February 8, 2013, to a five-year term on the Illinois Commerce Commission ("ICC"). The ICC's mission is to balance the interests of consumers and utilities to ensure adequate, efficient, reliable, safe, and least-cost public utility services, while promoting the development of an effectively competitive energy supplier market. The ICC also oversees transportation activities, including railroad safety, trucking insurance and registration, relocation and safety towing, and household goods moving companies.

== President of the Chicago Board of Education ==
Del Valle took office as the president of the Chicago Board of Education on June 26, 2019, having been appointed to that position by Mayor Lori Lightfoot.

During his tenure, the school district dealt with the challenge of the COVID-19 pandemic.

In the summer of 2020, protests were held against the district's contract with the Chicago Police Department for the provision of armed school resource officers at a number of high schools. Amid this, student protesters held a demonstration outside of Del Valle's house at the same time that he was at his residence participating in a school board meeting that was held via virtual means due to the pandemic. During this meetings, Del Valle cast a vote in favor of renewing the contract with the Chicago Police Department.

In 2023, Del Valle voiced concern that, while the district was trending positively out of financial strife, financial issues could still reemerge.

Del Valle's tenure ended on June 30, 2023, when he stepped down from the position.

== Additional leadership roles ==
Del Valle is a founding member of Advance Illinois and served on the Board of Directors until 2016. He was appointed by Illinois Governor Pat Quinn to the Illinois P-20 Council where he served as Chairman. Additionally del Valle served on several non-profit organizational boards, including Josephinium High School, the Latino Institute, the Spanish Coalition for Housing, and Federation for Community Schools. In 2013, del Valle was appointed by Governor Pat Quinn to the Illinois Students Assistance Commission ("ISAC"), where he served as Vice-Chairman. ISAC's mission is making college accessible and affordable for Illinois students.

Del Valle has served on the Judicial Candidate Screening Advisory Committee established by Chief Justice Mary Jane Theis of the Illinois Supreme Court.

He has also served as Chairman of the Mayor Harold Washington's Advisory Commission on Latino Affairs, and taught a class at Roosevelt University called "Latinos and Public Policy."

In 2008, del Valle was awarded an honorary degree from National Louis University for his "inspirational leadership."
