= Cristina Pacione-Zayas =

American politician

Cristina H. Pacione-Zayas

Member of the Illinois Senate from the 20th district
- In office December 20, 2020 – June 11, 2023
- Preceded by: Iris Martinez
- Succeeded by: Natalie Toro

Personal details
- Born: 1977 or 1978 (age 47–48) Chicago, Illinois, U.S.
- Party: Democratic
- Spouse: David Cruz
- Education: University of Illinois (BA, MEd, PhD)

Cristina H. Pacione-Zayas (born 1978) is an American politician and a former Democratic member of the Illinois State Senate. She resigned from the chamber in June 2023 to serve as first deputy chief of staff to Chicago Mayor Brandon Johnson. On April 2, 2024, she was appointed as Chief of Staff by Mayor Johnson

== Early life ==
Pacione-Zayas was born to Theresa (née Pacione) and Jose A. Zayas in Chicago, Illinois. Her mother is of Italian descent and her father is of Puerto Rican descent. She attended the University of Illinois at Urbana-Champaign for her dual Bachelor of Arts degrees (sociology and Spanish), Ed.M. and PhD in educational policy studies. During her time in school, she co-chaired the Campus Committee on Latinx Issues.

== Career ==
While in graduate school, Pacione-Zayas worked as the community schools director at Enlace Chicago. In this role, she managed eight community schools in the Little Village neighborhood. She then went on to work in Chicago Public Schools as a Culture of Calm Coordinator leading a school culture and climate transformation for Roberto Clemente Community Academy. Building from her community experience, she joined the Latino Policy Forum's Education Department in 2012 to lead efforts to expand early childhood care and education quality and access, support and pathways for more bilingual educators, and Latino and immigrant family engagement strategies. In 2016 she joined Erikson Institute. As Associate Vice President of Policy and Leadership, Pacione-Zayas established The Early Childhood Leadership Academy for Illinois leaders and directed the Community Data Lab.On February 27, 2019, Governor Pritzker appointed Pacione-Zayas to the Illinois Board of Education for a term starting February 25, 2019 and ending January 11, 2023. Pacione-Zayas was confirmed by the Illinois Senate on May 31, 2019.

When Iris Martinez announced her resignation as a Senator following her election as Clerk of the Circuit Court of Cook County, she tapped Pacione-Zayas as her successor. On December 22, 2020, Pacione-Zayas was officially sworn into office to fill the vacated seat, with her term ending in 2022. Although she stepped down from her role as Associate Vice President, Pacione-Zayas continued to provide counsel and subject matter expertise as a consultant and Senior Policy Advisor to Erikson.

While serving in the General Assembly, Senator Pacione-Zayas was a member of the following Illinois Senate committees:

- Appropriations - Education Committee (SAPP-SAED)
- Education Committee (SESE)
- Health Committee (SHEA)
- Higher Education Committee (SCHE)
- Human Rights Committee (SHUM)
- Redistricting - Chicago Northwest Committee (SRED-SRNW)
- Revenue Committee (SREV)
- Subcommittee on Children & Family (SHEA-SHCF)
- Subcommittee on Public Health (SHEA-SHPH)
