= Ocasio =

Ocasio is a Spanish surname found mostly in Puerto Rico. It may be derived from the Spanish "ocasión" meaning "occasion", but its meaning as a Spanish surname is unclear. Notable people with the surname include:

- Aleshia Ocasio (born 1996), Puerto Rican softball player
- Alexandria Ocasio-Cortez (born 1989), American politician and activist
- Bad Bunny (born 1994), real name Benito Martínez Ocasio, Puerto Rican artist
- Asunción Ocasio (born 1987), Puerto Rican taekwondo practitioner
- Billy Ocasio, American politician
- Cameron Ocasio (born 1999), American actor
- Daisy Ocasio (born 1964), Puerto Rican athlete
- Karina Ocasio (born 1985), Puerto Rican volleyball player
- Ossie Ocasio (born 1955), Puerto Rican boxer
- Ramon Ocasio III (born 1962), American judge
- Rauw Alejandro (born 1993), real name Raúl Alejandro Ocasio Ruiz, Puerto Rican artist
- Angel Luis Ocasio Jr (born 1994), Puerto Rican photographer
- Alfredo Ocasio (born 1952), Puerto Rican artist
