= 2011 Chicago mayoral election =

- February 22, 2011
- Turnout: 41.99% ▲9.55 pp
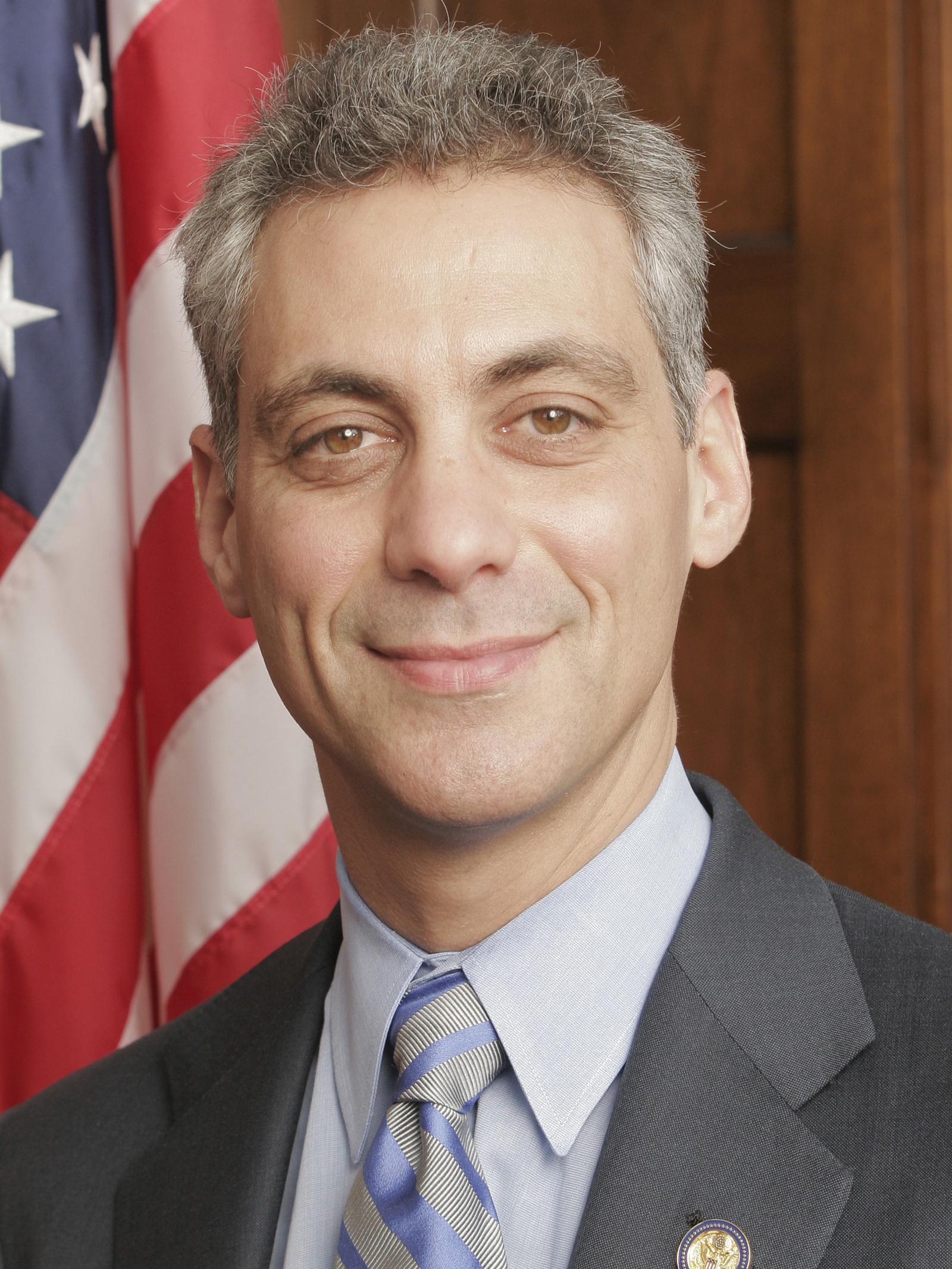

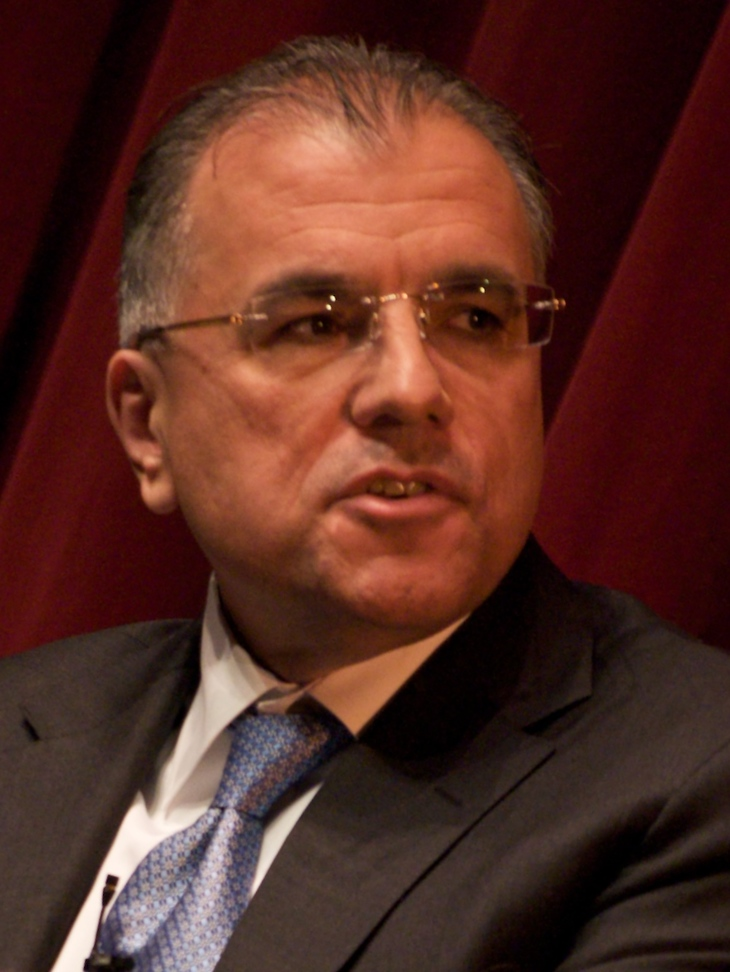

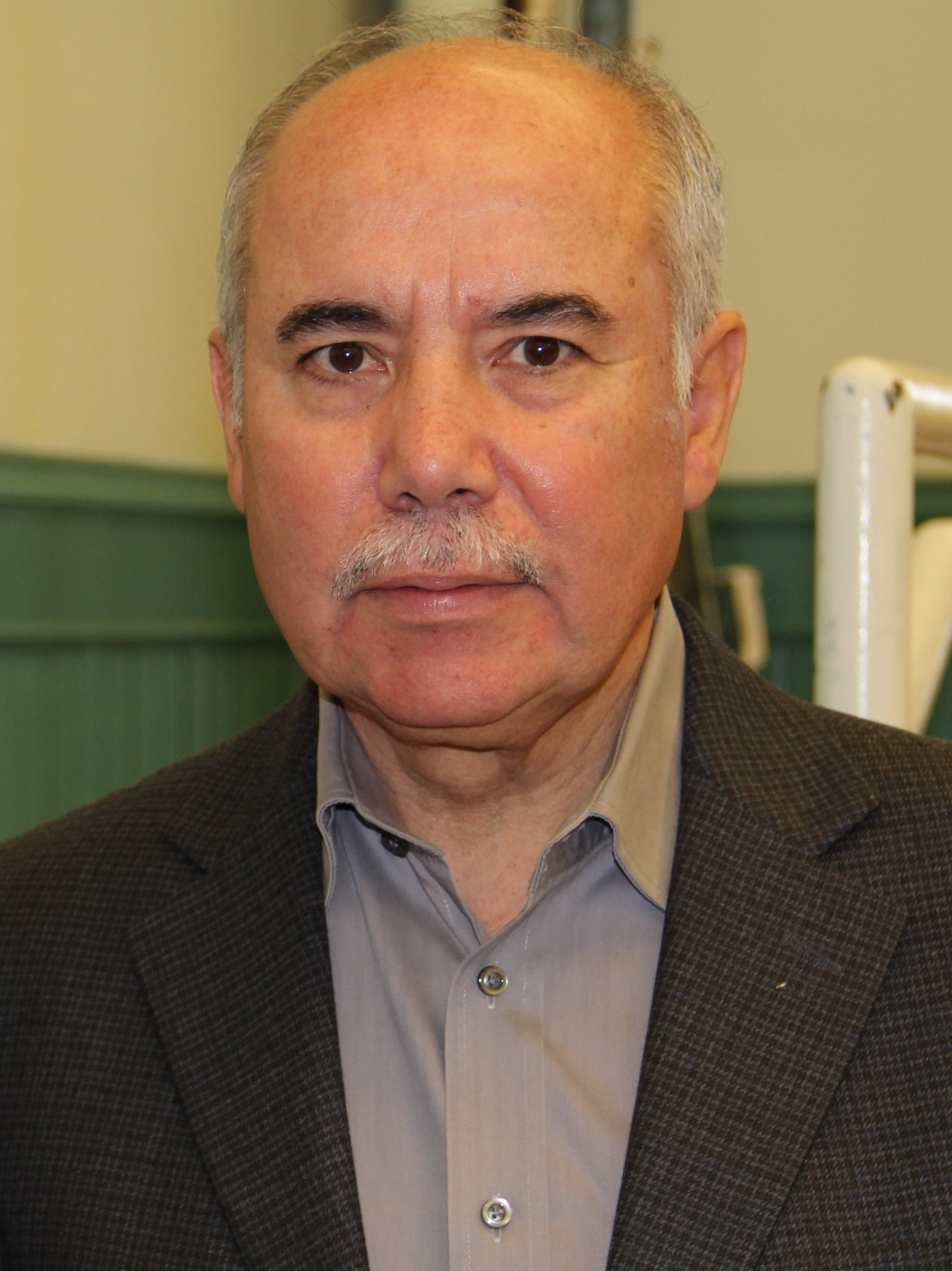

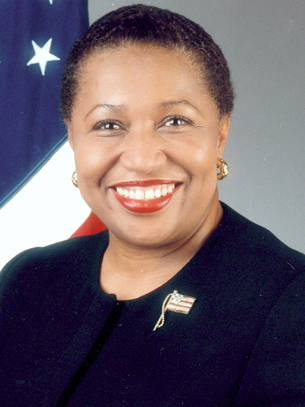
Candidate	Rahm Emanuel	Gery Chico
Popular vote	326,331	141,228
Percentage	55.27%	23.92%
Candidate	Miguel del Valle	Carol Moseley Braun
Popular vote	54,689	53,062
Percentage	9.26%	8.99%
- Ward results Emanuel: 30–40% 40–50% 50–60% 60–70% 70–80% Chico: 30–40% 40–50% 50–60% 60–70%
Mayor before election
Richard M. Daley
Elected Mayor
Rahm Emanuel

The city of Chicago, Illinois held a nonpartisan mayoral election on Tuesday, February 22, 2011. Incumbent Mayor Richard Michael Daley, a member of the Democratic Party who had been in office since 1989, did not seek a seventh term as mayor. This was the first non-special election since 1947 in which an incumbent mayor of Chicago did not seek reelection.

Candidates needed to collect 12,500 petition signatures by November 22, 2010, to qualify for a place on the ballot. April 5, 2011 was scheduled to be a runoff election date if no candidate received an absolute majority.

Rahm Emanuel won the race for mayor with more than 55% of the vote. He was inaugurated on May 16, 2011.

The election saw what was, at the time, the most candidates running on the ballot of any Chicago mayoral election since 1919. This would be surpassed by the 2019 Chicago mayoral election.

== Candidates ==
Nominating petitions were filed for 20 candidates in November 2010. In the initial review of the petitions by the Chicago Board of Election Commissioners on December 6, 2010, three candidates, Ryan Graves, M. Tricia Lee, and Jay Stone, were removed from the ballot for submitting insufficient numbers of signatures or duplicate signatures, although they had the right to seek reconsideration of the decision. Rob Halpin, businessman and tenant of Rahm Emanuel, withdrew from the election on the same day. Tom Hanson was removed by the Board of Election Commissioners on December 13, but filed a complaint in Circuit County Court Chancery division seeking reversal of the Board's decision, for being contrary to Illinois Election Code, Section 10–8, but was not reinstated. Former U.S. Senator from Illinois Roland Burris withdrew from the race on December 17, 2010. State Senator James Meeks ended his bid on December 23, 2010, the deadline for candidates to not appear on the ballot.

Danny K. Davis, U.S. Representative from Illinois's 7th district, withdrew on December 31, 2010, to support Carol Moseley Braun, in an attempt to unite voters behind a single major African American candidate.

Assemblies of God congregation leader Wilfredo De Jesús dropped out of the race on January 7, 2011, and endorsed Gery Chico.

Real estate broker John Hu was removed from the ballot by the Chicago Board of Election Commissioners on December 29, 2010. On January 11, 2011, the Chicago Board of Election Commissioners removed three additional candidates whose candidacies were challenged and finalized the election ballot of six candidates.

=== On ballot ===
Six candidates appeared on the February 22 ballot:

Candidate	Experience	Announced	Ref
Gery Chico	President of the Chicago Park District Board of Commissioners (2007–2010); President of the Chicago Board of Education (1995–2001) former Chief of Staff to Mayor Richard M. Daley former Chairman of the City Colleges of Chicago	September 28, 2010	
Miguel del Valle	City Clerk of Chicago since 2006; Illinois state senator from the 2nd district (1987–2006)	September 2010	
Rahm Emanuel	White House Chief of Staff (2009–2010); U.S. Congressman from Illinois' 5th district (2003–2009); Senior Advisor to the President of the United States (1993–1998); White House Director of Political Affairs (1993)	October 3, 2010	
Carol Moseley Braun	United States Ambassador to New Zealand (1999–2001) and to Samoa (2000–2001); United States Senator from Illinois (1993–1999); Cook County Recorder of Deeds (1988–1992); Member of the Illinois House of Representatives (1979–1988)	November 20, 2010	
Patricia Van Pelt Watkins	Non-profit administrator and activist		
William "Dock" Walls	former aide to Mayor Harold Washington community activist, businessman, and perennial candidate		

==== Write-in candidates ====
- D’Anne E. Burley
- Alfredo Castillo
- Alex George (AG)
- Anthony Brent Gray (Tony)
- Tommy Hanson
- John C. Hawkins
- John Hu
- Peter Dale Kauss, Sr
- “Fredrick” “Frederick” “Fred” “F.” K. White

=== Withdrew ===
The following individuals withdrew their candidacies

- Roland Burris, former United States Senator, candidate for mayor in 1995
- Danny K. Davis, congressman, candidate for mayor in 1999
- Rob Halpin
- Wilfredo De Jesús, Assemblies of God congregation leader
- James Meeks, state senator

=== Nominations invalid ===
The following candidates had their nominations deemed invalid by the Chicago Board of Elections, and thus were denied inclusion on the ballot:

- Tyrone Carter
- Ryan Graves
- Rob Hanson
- John Hu subsequently ran as write-in
- Fenton C. Patterson
- M. Tricia Lee
- Howard Ray
- Jay Stone
- Fredrick K. White subsequently ran as write-in

=== Declined ===
- Edward M. Burke, alderman, candidate for mayor in 1989
- Richard M. Daley, incumbent mayor
- Tom Dart, Cook County Sheriff
- Robert Fioretti, alderman
- Manuel Flores, Illinois Commerce Commission Chairman, former alderman
- Luis Gutiérrez, congressman
- James Houlihan, Cook County Assessor
- Jesse Jackson Jr., congressman
- Sandi Jackson, alderman
- Terry Peterson, Chicago Transit Authority chairman, former CEO of Chicago Housing Authority, former alderman
- Kwame Raoul, member of the Illinois Senate
- Larry Rogers, Jr., commissioner of the Cook County Board of Review.

== Eligibility of Emanuel ==
On January 24, 2011, Rahm Emanuel was removed from the ballot by the Illinois First District Appellate Court in a 2–1 decision. Emanuel's eligibility had been previously confirmed by the Chicago Board of Election Commissioners and a judge of Cook County. Emanuel appealed the case to the Supreme Court of Illinois. Chicago Tribune and Chicago Sun-Times criticized the ruling in editorials as "startling arrogance and audaciously twisted reasoning" and "pinched interpretation of the law [that] ignores the lawmakers' obvious intent". On January 25, 2011, the Supreme Court of Illinois issued a stay of the appellate court's ruling that Rahm Emanuel should be removed from the ballot. On January 27, 2011, the Supreme Court of Illinois, in a unanimous (7–0) decision, overturned the ruling of the Appellate Court and allowed Emanuel to stay on the ballot.

== Campaign ==
On September 23, 2010, Miguel del Valle became the first candidate to launch a television commercial in the mayoral race.

Rahm Emanuel announced his resignation as White House Chief of Staff on October 1, 2010, and went on to announce his mayoral candidacy on October 3. According to the Chicago Sun-Times, two Chicago election lawyers stated that Illinois municipal code requires mayoral candidates to reside in the town for a year before the election, making Emanuel ineligible to hold the office. On December 23, 2010, the Chicago Board of Election Commissioners unanimously rejected the challenge to Emanuel and ruled that he was a legal resident of Chicago.

The editorial pages of Chicago Tribune and Chicago Sun-Times endorsed Rahm Emanuel on February 4, 2011.

While President Barack Obama had not formally endorsed Emanuel, there was a public perception that the president favored his former Chief of Staff for mayor.

=== Endorsements ===
Gery Chico

Officeholders

- Edward M. Burke, Chicago 14th Ward alderman
- George Cardenas, 12th Ward alderman
- Luis Gutiérrez, US congressman
- John Pope, 10th Ward alderman
- Paul Vallas, former Chief Executive Officer of Chicago Public Schools
- Michael R. Zalewski, 23rd Ward alderman

Individuals

- Rick Garcia, gay activist, director of Equality Illinois
- Rev. B. Herbert Martin

Organizations

- Chicago Firefighters Union
- Fraternal Order of Police
Miguel del Valle

Officeholders

- Rey Colón, Chicago alderman
- William Delgado, state senator
- Jesús "Chuy" García, Cook County Commissioner
- Robyn Gabel, state representative
- Elizabeth Hernandez, state representative
- Edwin Reyes, Cook County Commissioner
- Cynthia Soto, state representative

Individuals

- Thomas Geoghegan
- Quentin Young

Newspapers

- Substance News

Organizations

- Independent Voters of Illinois-Independent Precinct Organization
- Northside Democracy for America
Rahm Emanuel

Officeholders

- Bill Clinton, former President of the United States
- David H. Hoffman, former Inspector General of Chicago
- Jan Schakowsky, US congresswoman

Individuals

- Steven Spielberg, filmmaker

Newspapers

- Crain's Chicago Business
- Chicago Sun-Times
- Chicago Tribune
- N'Digo

Organizations

- 48th Ward Democratic Party
- Equality Illinois PAC
- Flyover Geeks
- Human Rights Campaign
- Sierra Club
- Teamsters Joint Council 25
Carol Moseley Braun

Officeholders

- Danny K. Davis, United States representative, previously a candidate for mayor in 1991 and 2011
- Jesse Jackson, former Shadow Senator from the District of Columbia
- James Meeks, former State Senator, previously a candidate for mayor in 2011

Individuals

- Elzie Higginbottom, real estate developer
- John W. Rogers Jr., businessman
- Cornel West

Newspapers

- Chicago Crusader
- The Chicago Defender

Organizations

- Chicago NOW
- NOW Equality PAC

== Polling ==
=== First round ===
View source data.

Poll source	Date(s) administered	Sample size	Margin of error	Ed Burke	Roland Burris	Gery Chico	Bill Daley	Tom Dart	Danny K. Davis	Miguel Del Valle	Rahm Emanuel	Bob Fioretti	Luis Gutiérrez	Jim Houlihan	Jesse Jackson, Jr.	James Meeks	Carol Moseley Braun	Terry Peterson	Patricia Van Pelt-Watkins	William Walls	Other	Undecided
McKeon & Associates / Chicago Sun-Times (report)	September 8, 2010	600	± 4.3%	–	–	6%	–	12%	–	–	7%	3%	9%	3%	8%	10%	–	4%	–	–	3%	35%
We Ask America (report)	September 2010	2,365	?	6.31%	–	–	8.16%	13.66%	–	–	29.68%	2.95%	12.81%	2.30%	13.36%	8.21%	–	2.55%	–	–	–	–
Chicago Teamsters Joint Council 25 / Anzalone Liszt (report)	November 8–14, 2010	?	± 3.7%	–	–	10%	–	–	14%	4%	36%	–	–	–	–	7%	13%	–	–	–	–	–
We Ask America (report)	November 23, 2010	2,255	± 2.06%	–	2.40%	8.86%	–	–	7.29%	4.78%	39.00%	–	–	–	–	5.16%	12.33%	–	–	–	1.47%	18.72%
Greenberg Quinlan Rosner (report)	December 1–8, 2010	1,020	± 3%	–	1%	9%	–	–	10%	8%	43%	–	–	–	–	7%	11%	–	–	–	2%	7%
Chicago Tribune (report)	December 10–13, 2010	721	± 3.6%	–	–	9%	–	–	9%	3%	32%	–	–	–	–	7%	6%	–	–	–	–	30%
We Ask America (report)	December 20, 2010	2,239	± 2.07%	–	–	11.78%	–	–	6.63%	6.09%	43.83%	–	–	–	–	3.63%	7.78%	–	–	–	3.91%	16.35%
Chicago Teamsters Joint Council 25 / Anzalone Liszt (report)	January 4–6, 2011	500	±4.4%	–	–	10%	–	–	–	7%	42%	–	–	–	–	–	26%	–	–	–	–	–
Chicago Tribune/WGN (report)	January 15–19, 2011	708	±3.7%	–	–	16%	–	–	–	7%	44%	–	–	–	–	–	21%	–	1%	2%	–	9%
We Ask America (report)	January 24, 2011	2,308	±2.05%	–	–	14%	–	–	–	4%	52%	–	–	–	–	–	11%	–	–	–	–	16%
Richard Day Research (report)	February 3–7, 2011	600	±4%	–	–	14%	–	–	–	8%	54%	–	–	–	–	–	6%	–	–	–	3%	15%
NBC Chicago / Victory Research (report)	February 10–12, 2011	?	±3.46%	–	–	16.1%	–	–	–	9.6%	44.8%	–	–	–	–	–	22.5%	–	0.9%	1.1%	–	5.0%
We Ask America (report)	February 13, 2011	2,252	± 2.06%	–	–	23.72%	–	–	–	10.39%	58.21%	–	–	–	–	–	6.04%	–	0.97%	0.67%	–	–

=== Hypothetical runoff ===
Poll source	Date(s) administered	Sample size	Margin of error	Danny K. Davis	Rahm Emanuel	Carol Moseley Braun
Chicago Teamsters Joint Council 25 / Anzalone Liszt (report)	November 8–14, 2010	?	± 4.3%	33%	54%	–
Chicago Teamsters Joint Council 25 / Anzalone Liszt (report)	November 8–14, 2010	?	± 4.3%	–	55%	32%
Chicago Teamsters Joint Council 25 / Anzalone Liszt (report)	January 4–6, 2011	500	±4.4%	–	53%	31%

== Results ==
Mayor of Chicago 2011 (General Election)
Party	Candidate	Votes	%
Nonpartisan	Rahm Emanuel	326,331	55.27
Nonpartisan	Gery J. Chico	141,228	23.92
Nonpartisan	Miguel del Valle	54,689	9.26
Nonpartisan	Carol Moseley Braun	53,062	8.99
Nonpartisan	Patricia Van Pelt Watkins	9,704	1.64
Nonpartisan	William Walls, III	5,343	0.90
Write-in	Tommy Hanson	9	0.00
Write-in	John C. Hawkins	8	0.00
Write-in	“Fredrick” “Frederick” “Fred” “F.” K. White	6	0.00
Write-in	Alfredo Castillo	4	0.00
Write-in	John Hu	4	0.00
Write-in	Alex George (AG)	3	0.00
Turnout		590,391	41.99

=== Results by ward ===
Ward	Chico		Del Valle		Emanuel		Moseley Braun		Van Pelt Watkins		Walls		Total votes	Turnout %
Ward	Votes	%	Votes	%	Votes	%	Votes	%	Votes	%	Votes	%	Total votes	Turnout %
1	2,303	21.94%	2,263	21.56%	5,703	54.32%	152	1.45%	46	0.44%	31	0.30%	10,498	35.22%
2	2,486	16.42%	978	6.46%	9,754	64.44%	1,459	9.64%	338	2.23%	122	0.81%	15,137	40.03%
3	1,045	11.32%	417	4.52%	5,374	58.21%	1,973	21.37%	277	3.00%	146	1.58%	9,232	40.50%
4	1,319	9.65%	1,154	8.44%	8,136	59.51%	2,433	17.80%	337	2.47%	292	2.14%	13,671	48.68%
5	1,124	9.18%	866	7.07%	7,643	62.42%	2,055	16.78%	355	2.90%	201	1.64%	12,244	45.03%
6	1,315	8.62%	463	3.04%	8,947	58.65%	3,649	23.92%	558	3.66%	323	2.12%	15,255	42.70%
7	1,248	9.97%	470	3.76%	7,463	59.63%	2,669	21.32%	438	3.50%	228	1.82%	12,516	40.89%
8	1,455	9.06%	545	3.39%	9,475	59.01%	3,688	22.97%	536	3.34%	357	2.22%	16,056	44.74%
9	1,104	9.79%	301	2.67%	6,650	58.97%	2,581	22.89%	419	3.72%	222	1.97%	11,277	36.18%
10	5,661	52.71%	840	7.82%	3,790	35.29%	325	3.03%	73	0.68%	50	0.47%	10,739	41.54%
11	5,293	46.82%	1,023	9.05%	4,811	42.56%	111	0.98%	35	0.31%	32	0.28%	11,305	44.85%
12	2,527	51.53%	836	17.05%	1,403	28.61%	85	1.73%	30	0.61%	23	0.47%	4,904	36.29%
13	6,182	49.65%	1,363	10.95%	4,599	36.94%	203	1.63%	53	0.43%	50	0.40%	12,450	58.71%
14	3,971	60.77%	861	13.18%	1,603	24.53%	63	0.96%	25	0.38%	12	0.18%	6,535	46.68%
15	1,151	15.96%	439	6.09%	3,860	53.52%	1,409	19.54%	241	3.34%	112	1.55%	7,212	29.47%
16	1,146	18.24%	379	6.03%	3,216	51.19%	1,266	20.15%	181	2.88%	95	1.51%	6,283	29.23%
17	800	7.85%	237	2.32%	6,140	60.23%	2,343	22.98%	490	4.81%	184	1.80%	10,194	33.15%
18	3,193	20.44%	673	4.31%	8,188	52.41%	2,790	17.86%	510	3.26%	268	1.72%	15,622	44.94%
19	11,815	49.44%	1,477	6.18%	8,994	37.63%	1,263	5.28%	215	0.90%	134	0.56%	23,898	74.70%
20	943	12.24%	378	4.91%	4,320	56.06%	1,632	21.18%	273	3.54%	160	2.08%	7,706	33.41%
21	1,409	8.84%	426	2.67%	9,448	59.30%	3,698	23.21%	642	4.03%	310	1.95%	15,933	40.61%
22	2,082	43.82%	1,188	25.01%	1,292	27.19%	147	3.09%	33	0.69%	9	0.19%	4,751	30.69%
23	8,857	53.63%	1,140	6.90%	6,119	37.05%	280	1.70%	72	0.44%	48	0.29%	16,516	58.51%
24	864	9.07%	312	3.27%	5,680	59.61%	2,112	22.17%	408	4.28%	152	1.60%	9,528	31.66%
25	3,602	40.87%	1,677	19.03%	3,231	36.66%	214	2.43%	54	0.61%	36	0.41%	8,814	39.56%
26	1,703	21.69%	2,803	35.70%	3,049	38.83%	213	2.71%	62	0.79%	22	0.28%	7,852	32.85%
27	1,400	14.26%	814	8.29%	6,226	63.43%	1,050	10.70%	239	2.43%	87	0.89%	9,816	33.88%
28	792	9.44%	324	3.86%	5,059	60.33%	1,740	20.75%	351	4.19%	120	1.43%	8,386	29.66%
29	1,265	11.67%	539	4.97%	6,547	60.40%	2,030	18.73%	310	2.86%	149	1.37%	10,840	39.80%
30	2,014	31.18%	1,570	24.30%	2,722	42.14%	94	1.46%	40	0.62%	20	0.31%	6,460	31.16%
31	2,232	34.57%	1,669	25.85%	2,446	37.89%	72	1.12%	27	0.42%	10	0.15%	6,456	31.01%
32	2,784	19.87%	1,541	11.00%	9,410	67.18%	166	1.19%	61	0.44%	46	0.33%	14,008	40.30%
33	1,841	22.62%	1,614	19.83%	4,500	55.29%	111	1.36%	44	0.54%	29	0.36%	8,139	40.80%
34	1,296	8.94%	347	2.39%	8,666	59.79%	3,316	22.88%	562	3.88%	308	2.12%	14,495	39.10%
35	2,035	22.55%	2,797	30.99%	3,985	44.16%	129	1.43%	51	0.57%	28	0.31%	9,025	38.04%
36	5,319	37.03%	1,366	9.51%	7,199	50.11%	342	2.38%	77	0.54%	62	0.43%	14,365	48.42%
37	1,001	11.26%	522	5.87%	5,383	60.56%	1,648	18.54%	234	2.63%	100	1.13%	8,888	31.94%
38	4,175	33.60%	1,381	11.11%	6,670	53.68%	92	0.74%	61	0.49%	47	0.38%	12,426	44.75%
39	3,041	28.21%	1,218	11.30%	6,297	58.42%	137	1.27%	46	0.43%	39	0.36%	10,778	43.92%
40	2,090	19.76%	1,664	15.73%	6,518	61.61%	195	1.84%	71	0.67%	41	0.39%	10,579	42.86%
41	10,129	49.92%	1,306	6.44%	8,583	42.30%	138	0.68%	73	0.36%	61	0.30%	20,290	55.45%
42	3,413	18.13%	818	4.34%	14,118	74.98%	356	1.89%	63	0.33%	60	0.32%	18,828	44.40%
43	2,571	17.24%	788	5.28%	11,197	75.08%	233	1.56%	75	0.50%	50	0.34%	14,914	45.43%
44	2,090	15.98%	1,077	8.24%	9,703	74.20%	134	1.02%	43	0.33%	30	0.23%	13,077	40.90%
45	6,036	37.58%	1,516	9.44%	8,223	51.20%	144	0.90%	77	0.48%	66	0.41%	16,062	51.17%
46	2,191	15.18%	1,381	9.57%	10,062	69.70%	576	3.99%	143	0.99%	83	0.57%	14,436	48.19%
47	2,945	17.05%	2,482	14.37%	11,545	66.83%	170	0.98%	70	0.41%	62	0.36%	17,274	52.14%
48	1,949	14.57%	1,602	11.97%	9,143	68.34%	525	3.92%	107	0.80%	52	0.39%	13,378	46.77%
49	1,523	15.48%	1,587	16.13%	6,024	61.24%	508	5.16%	100	1.02%	95	0.97%	9,837	43.80%
50	2,498	21.77%	1,257	10.96%	7,217	62.91%	343	2.99%	78	0.68%	79	0.69%	11,472	45.19%

== See also ==
- Mayor of Chicago
