= Senator Guzman =

Senator Guzman (or Guzmán) may refer to:

- Graciela Guzmán (fl. 2020s), Illinois State Senate
- Lucía Guzmán (born 1945), Colorado State Senate
