= Carlos Ramirez-Rosa =

American politician and park superintendent

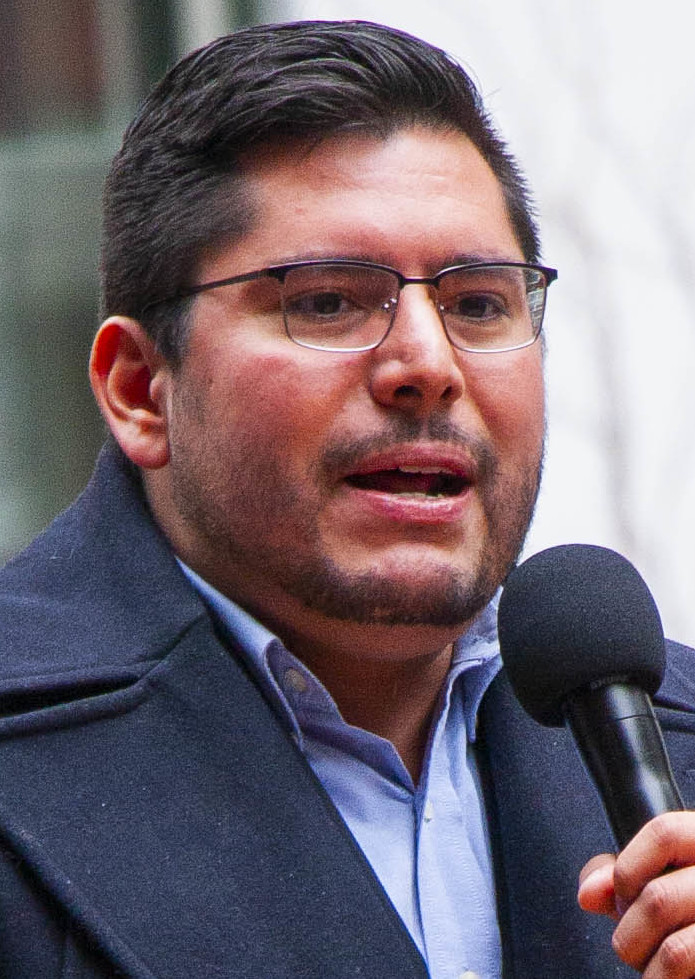
- Ramirez-Rosa in 2019

General Superintendent and CEO of the Chicago Park District
- Incumbent
- Assumed office April 1, 2025
- Preceded by: Rosa Escareño

Member of the Chicago City Council from the 35th Ward
- In office May 18, 2015 – April 1, 2025
- Preceded by: Rey Colón
- Succeeded by: Anthony Quezada

Personal details
- Born: February 18, 1989 (age 37) Chicago, Illinois, U.S.
- Party: Democratic
- Other political affiliations: Democratic Socialists of America
- Education: University of Illinois, Urbana-Champaign (BA)

Carlos Ramirez-Rosa (born 1989) is an American politician and public administrator who serves as General Superintendent and chief executive officer of the Chicago Park District, one of the largest urban park systems in the United States.

A democratic socialist, he previously represented Chicago's 35th Ward on the Chicago City Council from 2015 to 2025, where his legislative work spanned housing policy, public safety and policing reforms, immigration and civil rights, and efforts to expand participatory approaches to local governance.

== Early life and background ==
Ramirez-Rosa was born on February 18, 1989, in Chicago, Illinois. He attended Chicago Public Schools and graduated from Whitney M. Young Magnet High School, where he served as senior class president. He then attended the University of Illinois at Urbana–Champaign, where he was an elected member of the Illinois Student Senate. As an elected student senator, he supported funding for women and LGBT student programs, campus green energy policies, and fair treatment of university employees. He graduated from the University of Illinois in 2011.

After graduating, he served as a congressional caseworker in the office of Congressman Luis Gutiérrez. After working for Congressman Gutiérrez, he worked as a family support network organizer with the Illinois Coalition for Immigrant and Refugee Rights until he ran for alderman in 2015.

On April 8, 2014, Ramirez-Rosa was arrested while attempting to block a deportation bus leaving Broadview Detention Center in Broadview, Illinois. The arrest was part of the "Not One More " campaign to pressure President Barack Obama to stop deportations. Ramirez-Rosa said at the time of his arrest: "I'm a U.S. citizen. I don't fear deportation, but I know that when you're taking hard-working and decent people, putting them in detention centers and then putting them on buses and separating them from their families, that is an act of injustice."

Prior to his election to the Chicago City Council, Ramirez-Rosa was an elected community representative to the Avondale-Logandale Local School Council.

He is the nephew of Cook County Judge Ramon Ocasio III, and Chicanas of 18th Street author and activist Magda Ramirez-Castaneda. Ramirez-Rosa's mother is of Mexican descent and his father is of Puerto Rican descent.

In October 2024, Ramirez-Rosa married his longtime partner, Bryan Bautista, in Logan Square, Chicago.

Ramirez-Rosa is profiled in D. D. Guttenplan's book The Next Republic: The Rise of a New Radical Majority (2019), which examines organizers and leaders associated with contemporary progressive political movements in the United States.

== Chicago City Council ==
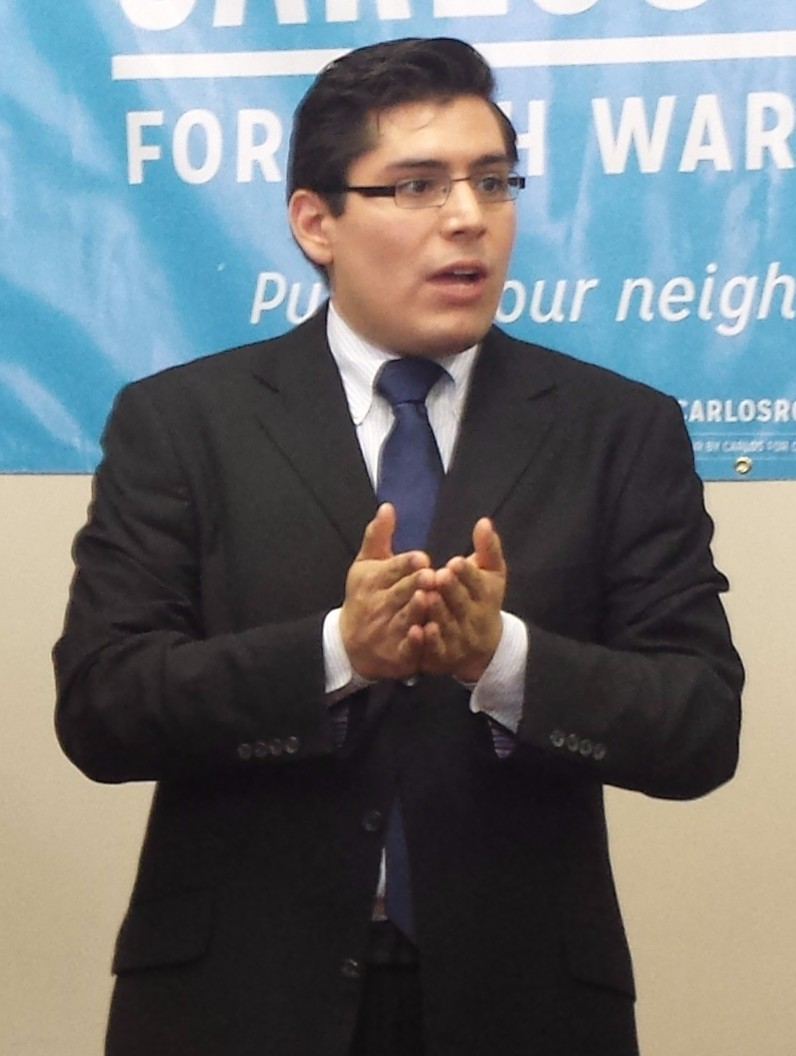
Ramirez-Rosa campaigning in 2015

Ramirez-Rosa was first elected the alderman of the 35th Ward on February 24, 2015. He received 67% of the vote, defeating incumbent alderman Rey Colón. He was re-elected to a second four-year term on February 26, 2019, and to a third term on February 28, 2023.

Upon his election in 2015, he was the youngest alderman on the City Council at the time and among the youngest in Chicago's history, and one of the city's first two openly LGBT Latino councilors alongside colleague Raymond Lopez. After a year as alderman, Crain's Chicago Business distinguished Ramirez-Rosa as a member of their 2016 "Twenty in their 20s" class. In 2023, Crain's Chicago Business distinguished Ramirez-Rosa as one of that year's "40 Under 40." He was a member of the Chicago City Council's Progressive Reform Caucus, Latino Caucus, the LGBT Caucus, and the inaugural chair and dean of the council's Democratic Socialist Caucus.

During the 2020 Democratic presidential primary, Ramirez-Rosa served as the Illinois State Vice-chair for Bernie Sanders' presidential campaign.

After Ramirez-Rosa resigned from the City Council to assume leadership of the Chicago Park District, Mayor Brandon Johnson appointed Cook County Commissioner Anthony Joel Quezada to fill the vacant 35th Ward seat, and the Chicago City Council confirmed the appointment in April 2025.

=== City budget and property tax rebate ===
In 2015, Ramirez-Rosa opposed Mayor Rahm Emanuel's record $589 million property tax increase, arguing that the city should have "emptied out hundreds of millions in TIF funds before raising property taxes and fees on Chicago's working families." Ramirez-Rosa voted no on Mayor Emanuel's 2016 budget proposal and property tax increase. After the property tax increase passed, Ramirez-Rosa proposed a $35 million property tax rebate for struggling homeowners. Ultimately, Ramirez-Rosa joined with Mayor Rahm Emanuel to sponsor and pass a $21 million property tax rebate program. Ramirez-Rosa said of the compromise: "this proposal ensures that the poorest homeowners who see the largest property-tax increase get the maximum rebate."

In November 2019, Ramirez-Rosa was one of eleven aldermen to vote against Mayor Lori Lightfoot's first budget. He joined all five other members of the Socialist Caucus in signing a letter to Lightfoot which criticized her budget for "an over-reliance on property taxes" and "regressive funding models" that are "burdensome to our working-class citizens, while giving the wealthy and large corporations a pass."

In November 2024, Ramirez-Rosa was among Chicago City Council members who voted against Mayor Brandon Johnson's proposed $300 million property tax increase during negotiations over the city's 2025 budget.

=== Chicago Immigration Policy Working Group ===
In August 2015, Ramirez-Rosa was a founding member of the Chicago Immigration Policy Working Group. Ramirez-Rosa and the working group successfully pushed the City of Chicago to provide free or low-cost legal assistance to Chicagoans facing deportation, provide support for DACA applicants, expand language access, and create a municipal ID. In 2021, Ramirez-Rosa and the working group succeeded in removing the carveouts from Chicago's sanctuary city ordinance, ensuring the Chicago Police Department could not work with Immigration and Customs Enforcement in any case. Ramirez-Rosa co-sponsored the successful measure alongside Mayor Lori Lightfoot. He first introduced the measure to remove the carveouts in 2017.

=== Housing and development ===
Throughout his tenure on the Council, Ramirez-Rosa supported and advanced several affordable housing developments in his ward. Among them was the Lucy Gonzalez Parsons Apartments, a 100-unit, all-affordable transit-oriented development built on a former city-owned parking lot adjacent to the Logan Square Blue Line station. Developed by Bickerdike Redevelopment Corporation, the project includes units affordable to households earning below 60 percent of the area median income and was named in honor of labor organizer Lucy Gonzalez Parsons.

In Albany Park, Ramirez-Rosa supported the construction of the Oso Apartments, a 48-unit, all-affordable housing development located near Montrose and Kimball avenues.

After a fire destroyed the Independence Branch Library in Irving Park, Ramirez-Rosa supported rebuilding the library at a new site co-located with affordable housing, combining a new public library with residential units for low-income seniors.

In addition to supporting affordable housing, Ramirez-Rosa has advocated for rent control. In 2021, he sponsored successful ordinances to establish minimum density requirements, and a demolition impact fee for portions of his ward facing high displacement. Ramirez-Rosa argued these ordinances would help preserve naturally-occurring affordable housing.

In September 2024, the City Council approved Ramirez-Rosa's Northwest Side Housing Preservation Ordinance, expanding and codifying anti-displacement protections in portions of Logan Square, Avondale, Hermosa, Humboldt Park, and West Town. The ordinance strengthened protections for multi-unit residential buildings by restricting demolitions and limiting conversions of multi-unit buildings into single-family homes. It also established tenant purchase protections by providing tenants with a right of first refusal when their building is offered for sale.

In November 2018, he supported the creation of the First Nations Garden on a large city-owned lot in his ward. The First Nations Garden was created by American Indian youth as a place to heal and connect back to nature. The garden was inaugurated with a land acknowledgement ceremony that included a Chicago City Council resolution passed by Ramirez-Rosa that acknowledged Chicago as an "indigenous landscape."

In 2020, Ramirez-Rosa supported the legalization of accessory dwelling units in much of his ward. He supported historic preservationist efforts in his district, including the allocation of $250,000 in public landmark funds to help restore Logan Square's Minnekirken.

Ramirez-Rosa worked with community organizations and the Chicago Department of Planning and Development on rezoning initiatives along Milwaukee Avenue, including sponsoring the Milwaukee Avenue Special Character Overlay District, which established design guidelines intended to preserve the corridor's historic character while allowing context-sensitive development aligned with existing neighborhood patterns.

In May 2024, Ramirez-Rosa broke ground on a more than $27 million Milwaukee Avenue and Logan Square redesign project — previously known as the Logan Square Bicentennial Improvement Project — which reconfigured the historic Logan Square traffic circle, rerouted Kedzie Avenue, and added new pedestrian and public spaces, a change he championed through a multi-year community input and design process involving Chicago Department of Transportation and Logan Square community organizations.

=== Participatory democracy ===
Ramirez-Rosa has consistently expressed his belief in participatory democracy as central to his work as a democratic socialist elected official. In 2017, he told The Nation Magazine: "I'm a big believer that we can build socialism from below. We need to create these opportunities for working people to hold the reins of power and govern themselves." Likewise, in 2017, he told Jacobin magazine: "democratic socialism means that the people govern every facet of their lives, whether it be the economic structure or the government that's determining the policies that impact their lives."

As part of this approach, Ramirez-Rosa helped found United Neighbors of the 35th Ward (UN35), a neighborhood-based political organization active in his ward. In These Times described UN35 as an "independent political organization," engaging residents in collective decision-making and electoral activity, and noted that Ramirez-Rosa viewed his City Council seat as an extension of community base-building and co-governance rather than a solely individual mandate.

In 2019, Ramirez-Rosa explained to writer Micah Uetricht how he seeks to put participatory democracy into action in his elected office: "In the thirty-fifth ward we have what we call 'people-power initiatives.' To date, those are three programs that we run through my office. They seek to show people's ability to govern themselves and collectively come together and make decisions. We don't need the Donald Trumps of the world, the Jeff Bezoses of the world... telling us what our communities should look like or how we should live our lives. We collectively, from the grassroots, from below, can determine our own destiny."

The three "people-power initiatives" Ramirez-Rosa supported through his elected office were "community-driven zoning and development" - a local participatory planning process, participatory budgeting for the allocation of infrastructure improvement dollars, and a local rapid-response deportation defense network called the "community defense committee." The "community defense committee" distributed immigration know-your-rights cards door-to-door, organized know-your-rights trainings, and trained ward residents in how to engage in civil disobedience to stop deportations.

Ramirez-Rosa has also called himself a "movement elected official," stating his "role is to be an organizer on the inside for those movements that are organizing people-power bases on the outside."

=== Police reform and No Cop Academy campaign ===
In 2016, Ramirez-Rosa worked with the Chicago Alliance Against Racist and Political Repression to introduce the Chicago Police Accountability Council (CPA) ordinance. The ordinance sought to enact civilian oversight of the Chicago Police Department via an all-elected civilian body. Ramirez-Rosa said the ordinance "could be a model for true police accountability reform across the country." In 2021, Ramirez-Rosa led efforts to join the CPAC ordinance with a rival civilian oversight ordinance. The new ordinance – Empowering Communities for Public Safety – passed the Chicago City Council on July 21, 2021; Ramirez-Rosa was a chief sponsor. The passage of the ordinance led to the historic election of 66 civilians in the 2023 Chicago municipal election to serve as police district councilors.

In December 2017, Ramirez-Rosa was the sole member of the Chicago City Council to support the No Cop Academy campaign, a grassroots abolitionist effort to stop the city from spending $95 million on a new police academy building and instead spend that money on education, after-school programs, job training, and social services. Ramirez-Rosa would explain his support of the No Cop Academy campaign as follows: "police violence has cost Chicagoans $662 million in settlements since 2004, and CPD is funded to a tune of $4 million per day, $1.5 billion per year. Our nation has witnessed the magnitude of police crimes in the City of Chicago with the murders of Rekia Boyd and Laquan McDonald. The Chicago Police Department is not lacking in resources, it is lacking in accountability and oversight. The $95 million that the City is projected to spend on this new cop academy should be invested in jobs, education, youth programs, and mental health services, not a new shooting range and swimming pool for police.”

In May 2018, after successfully delaying a vote on the new police academy, Ramirez-Rosa was expelled from the Chicago City Council's Latino Caucus. Ramirez-Rosa was later readmitted to the Latino Caucus after public outcry.

In 2020, in the wake of George Floyd protests, Ramirez-Rosa helped dozens of Black Lives Matter protesters recover their bikes which had been confiscated by the Chicago Police.

=== Pandemic response ===
In 2020, in response to the COVID-19 pandemic, Ramirez-Rosa used his aldermanic office's resources to initiate and support neighborhood mutual aid networks, and to target support to communities most impacted by the pandemic. Ramirez-Rosa's office distributed a bilingual newsletter to 7,000 ward households to provide residents with information on unemployment insurance and resources available to support them during the pandemic. Ramirez-Rosa joined with his socialist colleagues to call for a pandemic response that prioritized "the most vulnerable." He also worked to expand Chicago's emergency rental assistance to undocumented Chicagoans. In December 2020, he helped bring the One Fair Wage High Road Kitchens program to Chicago, which provided grants to restaurants who committed to transition to a full minimum wage with tips on top.

=== Economic justice and workers' rights ===
Ramirez-Rosa has advocated for the raising of Chicago's minimum wage to a living wage, and other measures in support of workers' rights. He was a sponsor of the successful Fair Workweek ordinance to provide hourly-workers with stability in their work schedules. He also sponsored the ordinance to raise Chicago's minimum wage to $15. Ramirez-Rosa also worked to create a municipal Office of Labor Standards to protect Chicago workers.

On October 4, 2018, Ramirez-Rosa was arrested at a Fight for $15 protest outside McDonald's global headquarters in the West Loop. He was arrested alongside striking workers as they blocked the entrance to the building in an act of civil disobedience. The McDonald's workers were demanding a $15 wage and a union. Ramirez-Rosa has spoken at several Fight for $15 demonstrations.

In 2017, Ramirez-Rosa sponsored and passed an ordinance to designate Kedzie Avenue in his ward as "Lucy Gonzalez Parsons Way," in honor of the late labor organizer and founder of the IWW union. Parsons lived off Kedzie Avenue at 3130 N. Troy. At an honorary street sign unveiling event held on May 1, 2017, International Workers' Day, Ramirez-Rosa said: "The conditions Lucy and other workers were facing... are not too different from the conditions we're facing now. Today we honor Lucy Gonzalez Parsons because she taught us the way, she taught us that you don't take it sitting down, you don't live on your knees, you rise up and you fight back."

In 2023, Ramirez-Rosa played a central role in the passage of Chicago's One Fair Wage ordinance, which raised the hourly pay for hospitality workers by phasing tipped workers up to the full minimum wage while allowing tips to remain in addition to wages. The policy aligned Chicago with other U.S. jurisdictions that have ended separate wage standards for tipped and non-tipped workers and represented one of the most significant labor policy changes adopted by the City Council in decades.

Ramirez-Rosa had supported One Fair Wage legislation for several years as an alderperson and, in 2023, served as a key negotiator and vote counter as City Council Floor Leader. In that role, he worked to secure majority support for the ordinance amid opposition from restaurant industry groups and helped shepherd the measure through the legislative process as part of a broader labor reform package that expanded paid leave and strengthened workplace protections for Chicago workers.

=== LGBTQ rights and bodily autonomy ===
In 2016, Ramirez-Rosa sponsored a successful measure to ensure transgender persons had the right to access the public bathroom of their choice. During City Council debate on the ordinance, Ramirez-Rosa said: "We must do everything we can to legislate love and to reject hate... we can legislate love because we can show that as a city, we will not discriminate against our trans-sisters and brothers, that we will allow equality to reign supreme when it comes to access to public accommodations.”

In 2022, Ramirez-Rosa supported and helped advance Chicago's Bodily Autonomy Ordinance, which strengthened abortion rights by limiting city cooperation with out-of-state investigations related to abortion care and certain forms of gender-affirming healthcare that are legal in Illinois.

In 2024, following Ramirez-Rosa's advocacy, Mayor Brandon Johnson established a Transfemicide Working Group by executive order to develop recommendations addressing violence against transgender women and gender-diverse people; the Council later adopted Ramirez-Rosa's ordinance codifying the mayor's executive order.

=== Council leadership roles and controversy ===
Throughout his tenure on the Chicago City Council, Ramirez-Rosa served in several leadership roles, including chair of the Democratic Socialist Caucus, vice chair of the Latino Caucus, and as a board member of the Chicago City Council Latino Caucus Foundation. From May to November 2023, he served as Mayor Brandon Johnson's City Council Floor Leader and chair of the Committee on Zoning, Landmarks, and Building Standards.

In November 2023, amid heightened tensions related to a proposed referendum on Chicago's sanctuary city ordinance during the city's migrant crisis, a procedural dispute occurred on the City Council floor. Following the adjournment of a special meeting called by opponents of the ordinance, Alderman Raymond Lopez alleged that Ramirez-Rosa had physically assaulted Alderman Emma Mitts in an effort to prevent a quorum from being reached.

Ramirez-Rosa denied the allegation, and video footage released shortly thereafter showed him briefly touching Mitts' arm and standing in her path before moving aside, without evidence of physical assault. Mitts later accepted Ramirez-Rosa's apology on the City Council floor, and a motion to censure him failed, with both Mitts and Mayor Brandon Johnson voting against censure.

Following the incident, Ramirez-Rosa resigned from his City Council leadership roles but continued to serve as an alderperson. Progressive elected officials and community leaders characterized the episode leading to his leadership resignation as politically motivated and tied to broader opposition to a progressive legislative agenda, including sanctuary city protections and labor reforms.

== Chicago Park District Superintendency ==
In February 2025, Mayor Brandon Johnson announced his support for Ramirez-Rosa to serve as General Superintendent and Chief Executive Officer of the Chicago Park District, and the Park District Board of Commissioners confirmed the appointment; he assumed the role in April 2025.

During Ramirez-Rosa's first summer as general superintendent, the Park District announced that all 50 of its outdoor pools would operate seven days a week for the summer season, marking the first time the District had maintained daily outdoor pool service since the COVID-19 pandemic.

Under Ramirez-Rosa's leadership, the Park District partnered with city officials and community stakeholders to move forward with plans to convert the Calumet Harbor Confined Disposal Facility (CDF), a site that had been the subject of longstanding environmental concern, into future lakefront parkland known as Park #608, including initial funding for community planning activities.

In November 2025, Ramirez-Rosa presented the Park District's proposed 2026 operating budget to the Board of Commissioners with priorities aimed at expanding programming and addressing infrastructure needs; Ramirez-Rosa's proposal was unanimously approved by the Park District Board of Commissioners at their December 2025 meeting.

Local reporting in 2025 noted tensions around immigration enforcement activity in and near public spaces, including parks; Ramirez-Rosa sent a letter urging Immigration and Customs Enforcement officials in Chicago to stop what he characterized as trespassing on Park District property in connection with summer cultural events in Humboldt Park. Subsequent action designated Chicago parks as “ICE-free zones,” and signage was posted at parks describing restrictions on the use of public property for civil immigration enforcement operations.

During Ramirez-Rosa's tenure, the Park District adopted updates to its policies related to gender identity and gender expression, strengthening nondiscrimination protections and making explicit inclusive practices across District programs. In 2025, amid national debates over the display of LGBTQ Pride symbols by public institutions, the Park District raised Progress Pride flags at District facilities during Pride Month as part of its annual programming.

As general superintendent and CEO, Ramirez-Rosa serves in several ex officio governance roles associated with the Park District, including representing the Park District on the governing boards of the Adler Planetarium and in regional tourism promotion through Choose Chicago, as well as serving on the Chicago Plan Commission.

== Electoral history ==
=== Aldermanic elections ===
Chicago 35th Ward aldermanic general election, 2015
Party	Candidate	Votes	%
Nonpartisan	Carlos Ramirez-Rosa	4,082	67.26
Nonpartisan	Rey Colon (incumbent)	1,987	32.74
Total votes		6,069	100

Chicago 35th Ward aldermanic general election, 2019
Party	Candidate	Votes	%
Nonpartisan	Carlos Ramirez-Rosa (incumbent)	4,685	59.50
Nonpartisan	Amanda Yu Dieterich	3,194	40.50
Total votes		7,908	100

Chicago 35th Ward aldermanic general election, 2023
Party	Candidate	Votes	%
Nonpartisan	Carlos Ramirez-Rosa (incumbent)	9,570	100
Total votes		9,570	100

=== Democratic committeeman ===
Ramirez-Rosa served as 35th Ward Democratic Committeeman from 2016 to 2020. In 2019, he supported Anthony Joel Quezada to replace him as Democratic Committeeman in the March 2020 primary election. In 2022, upon Quezada's election to the Cook County Board of Commissioners, Ramirez-Rosa was appointed to serve the remainder of Quezada's term as 35th Ward Democratic Committeeman.

In March 2024, Ramirez-Rosa was elected to a full term as 35th Ward Democratic Committeeperson and also serves as sergeant-at-arms of the Cook County Democratic Party, an officer position on the party's executive committee.

In May 2025, Jessica Vasquez, who previously served as Ramirez-Rosa's chief of staff, was selected by local Democratic leaders to fill the Cook County Board of Commissioners vacancy created when County Commissioner Anthony Quezada was appointed to Ramirez-Rosa's vacancy on the Chicago City Council. As Democratic committeeperson for the 35th Ward, Ramirez-Rosa was tasked with convening and presiding over the selection meeting, which included public participation and input from community members and local organizations before the appointment decision was finalized.

=== Campaigns for higher office ===
Daniel Biss's selected Ramirez-Rosa as his running mate in the 2018 Illinois gubernatorial election on August 31, 2017. Only six days later Biss dropped him from the ticket after his ally Brad Schneider rescinded his endorsement due to Ramirez-Rosa's support of the BDS Movement, which seeks to impose comprehensive boycotts of Israel until it ends its human rights violations against the Palestinians.

After Luis Gutiérrez announced his retirement from Congress, Ramirez-Rosa announced his candidacy for Gutiérrez's seat, Illinois's 4th congressional district. Ramirez-Rosa withdrew on January 9, 2018, and endorsed Jesus "Chuy" Garcia that same day, citing his desire to not split the progressive vote in the Democratic primary.

== See also ==
- Chicago aldermanic elections, 2015
- Chicago City Council
- List of Democratic Socialists of America who have held office in the United States
