= Ramon Ocasio III =

American judge (born 1962)

6th Judicial Subcircuit of the Circuit Court of Cook County
- Incumbent
- Assumed office 2007
- Nominated by: Democratically Elected
- Preceded by: Sub-Circuit Created

Personal details
- Born: September 20, 1962 (age 64) Humboldt Park, Chicago
- Party: Democratic
- Education: University of Illinois (BA); Northeastern University (JD)
- Profession: Lawyer

Ramon Ocasio III (born 1962) is a judge in the Circuit Court of Cook County, first elected in 2006 from the 6th Judicial Subcircuit. The 6th Judicial Subcircuit is located in Chicago's north side.

== Early life ==
A lifelong resident of Chicago, Ocasio graduated from Roberto Clemente High School in Humboldt Park. After receiving his bachelor's degree from the University of Illinois at Urbana-Champaign he went on to law school at Northeastern University. Ocasio joined the bar in 1989, and spent four years as a public defender in criminal cases. He left his job as a public defender to run the Illinois Attorney General's regional consumer fraud office in Chicago. Eight years later he would return to the public defender's office, where he supervised 18 other lawyers. Before being elected judge, Ocasio served as president of the Puerto Rican Bar Association of Illinois and as a representative on the Inter-American Magnet School Local School Council. In October 1996, while serving as President of the Puerto Rican Bar Association, Ocasio published a letter in the Chicago Tribune criticizing journalist Georgie Anne Geyer for anti-immigrant and anti-Hispanic rhetoric.

== Campaign for judge ==
In 2006, Ocasio entered the race for Judge of the 6th Judicial Subcircuit. Although he was rated qualified to highly qualified by all 10 bar associations in Cook County, the Democratic Committeeman chose to slate Ed Lechowicz, son of former State Senator and Cook County Commissioner, Ted Lechowicz. State Senator Miguel del Valle, State Senator Iris Martinez, and Chicago Alderman Rey Colon all endorsed and actively campaigned for Ocasio. Lechowicz spent a total of $219,594.16 on his campaign to Ocasio's $32,266.71. Ocasio won with 43.33% of the vote; Lechowicz received 36.70% and Roxanne L. Rochester came in third with 19.97% of the vote.

== Judgeship ==
Immediately following his election Ocasio presided over Cook County's traffic court. Ocasio now presides over Cook County's criminal court. In this capacity Ocasio had presided over several notable cases. Ocasio set a 3 million dollar bail for Daniel Lopez, a man accused of stabbing 3 people in a Walgreens in Chicago's south side]. Ocasio denied bail to Timothy Herring, Jr., who shot and killed Michael Flisk, a Chicago Police Department officer, and Stephen Peters, a retired Chicago Housing Authority officer. Ocasio denied bail to Tommie Naylor, a mail carrier who kidnapped and raped two teenage girls. In 2010 Ocasio upheld hate crime charges against 3 men accused of attacking and beating a gay man on the CTA's Red Line. In July 2011 Ocasio denied bail to Daniel Jones, a man charged with shooting and wounding two Chicago Police officers. In 2018 he granted probation to a repeat offender of DUI who had been arrested in seven states.

== Personal life ==
Judge Ocasio is married to Norma Ramirez, and has no children. His nephew is 35th Ward Alderman Carlos Ramirez-Rosa.

== See also ==
- List of Hispanic and Latino American jurists
