= James Laski =

Former Chicago politician, radio personality, and ex-con

City Clerk of Chicago
- In office 1995–2006
- Preceded by: Ernest Wish
- Succeeded by: Miguel del Valle

Personal details
- Born: 1954 (age 71–72) Chicago, Illinois, U.S.
- Party: Democratic
- Education: Lewis University; Northern Illinois University (J.D.)
- Profession: Politician; Attorney (nonpracticing); Radio host

James J. "Jim" Laski (born 1954) was the City Clerk of Chicago, Illinois from 1995–2006. The former congressional aid and city alderman resigned from the City Clerk's office following his indictment for obstruction of justice due to his involvement in the city's scandal-plagued Hired Truck Program. After serving a prison sentence, Laski became a controversial talk-radio host for a program that was broadcast on two Chicago-area radio stations. He also wrote a book about his experiences in Chicago politics and federal prison.

== Personal life ==
Laski grew up on the southwest side of Chicago, a lifelong resident of Chicago's 23rd Ward. He attended St. Laurence High School and graduated with a degree in political science from Lewis University. He graduated from Northern Illinois University College of Law in 1978, and quickly volunteered his services to then 23rd Ward Alderman, William O. "Bill" Lipinski.

== Political career ==
"Bill [Lipinski] once told me, `People out here have short memories...' "but I think when it comes to taxes, people have long memories." —James Laski

By 1988 Laski was chief of staff of the joint Democrat Service Office for the city's southwest side, and a personal aid to Lipinski, by then a United States congressman. In 1991 he was appointed city alderman of the 23rd Ward to fill the vacancy created when his predecessor, Alderman William Krystyniak, was appointed personnel director of the Cook County Highway Department. While a member of the city council he had a falling out with his mentor, Lipinski, over a proposed tax increase. Laski's publicly stated position on the issue, however, helped him in 1995 to be popularly elected as Chicago City Clerk, the second-highest ranking elected position in Chicago after the mayor's office. He had come into the office as a 'reformer' following his several times elected predecessor, Walter Kozubowski's, conviction in a ghost payroll scheme. Laski was re-elected to the post in 1999 and 2003.

== Indicted ==
Laski resigned from his position in February 2006, —and gave up his law license— after being indicted in January of that year for soliciting bribes and obstructing justice regarding his involvement in the City of Chicago's Hired Truck Program. Federal agents had caught him on tape encouraging witnesses to lie to a grand jury and deny that they had been giving him anywhere from $500 to $1,000 a month in cash bribes to continue getting business from the program. In March 2006, Laski pleaded guilty to obstruction. In June 2006, Laski was sentenced to 27 months in prison. Laski reported to the Federal Correctional Institution in Morgantown, West Virginia to begin serving his sentence on September 11, 2006, where he served 11 months of his sentence. Laski then served an additional six months at a halfway house.

== Radio personality ==
Following his release, Laski was hired on as a prime time weekday radio personality at WGN AM 720 in Chicago. The station's website described the host as "a rebel and maverick in political circles taking on the tough issues and fighting the powers that be in City Hall ... his flair for speaking his mind leaves no one guessing where Jim stands on the issues." Laski's show, however, was discontinued after eighteen months. In early 2013, Laski hosted a self-produced —but relatively short-lived— weekend talk show, the Laski Files, on WCPT AM 820 out of Willow Springs, a suburb of Chicago.

== Author ==
Laski wrote a book detailing his experience in the City Clerk's office and his later imprisonment entitled, My Fall From Grace – City Hall to Prison Walls.
