= Graciela Guzmán =

American politician

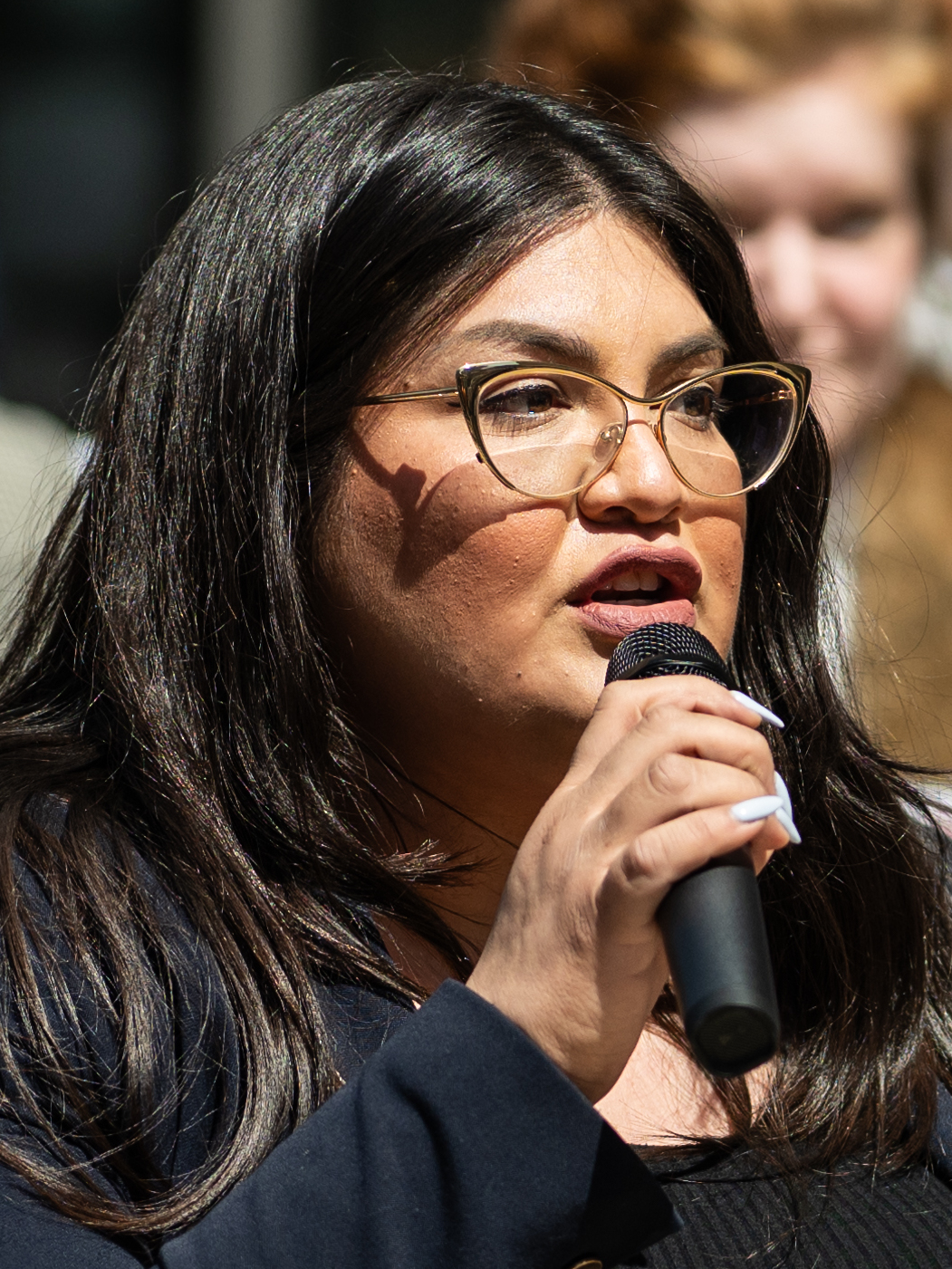
- Guzmán in 2025

Member of the Illinois Senate from the 20th district
- Incumbent
- Assumed office January 8, 2025
- Preceded by: Natalie Toro

Personal details
- Born: Los Angeles, California
- Party: Democratic Party
- Education: Grinnell College (BA)
- Website: https://gracielafor20.com/

Graciela Guzmán is an American politician and member of the Illinois Senate from the 20th district since 2024.

== Early life and education ==
Guzmán is one of five children, born to refugees of the Salvadorian Civil War. She graduated from Grinnell College in 2011 with a degree in anthropology.

== Early career ==
Guzmán founded the Chicago Affordable Care Act Consortium and the Belmont Cragin Mutual Aid and Northwest Mutual Aid hub. She later served as chief of staff to State Senator Christina Pacione-Zayas. She is an organizer with the Chicago Teachers Union.

== Illinois Senate ==
Guzmán defeated incumbent Natalie Toro in the Democratic primary for the Illinois 20th Senate District in 2024. She won the general election later that year and assumed office in January 2025.

=== Committees ===
In the 104th General Assembly, Guzmán served as the vice-chair of the Appropriations - Education Committee. She also served on the Appropriations - Health and Human Services, Higher Education, Human Rights, Public Health, and Veterans Affairs Committees.

=== Other Actions ===
In 2025, Guzmán advocated to save a program offering health care coverage for Illinois residents without legal status. After ICE increased operations in Chicago as part of "Operation Midway Blitz" in September 2025, she also helped organize constituents to conduct daily ICE patrols with the goal of alerting neighbors to the presence and actions of the agency.

== Electoral history ==
Illinois 20th Senate District Primary Election, 2024
Party	Candidate	Votes	%
Democratic	Graciela Guzmán	11,618	50.16
Democratic	Natalie Toro (incumbent)	6,957	21.38
Democratic	Dave Nayak	3,590	15.50
Democratic	Geary Yonker	997	4.30
Total votes		23,162	100

Illinois 20th Senate District General Election, 2024
Party	Candidate	Votes	%
Democratic	Graciela Guzmán	61,803	81.23
Republican	Jason Proctor	14,281	18.77
Total votes		76,084	100
