= Latino Institute =

Former Chicago-based advocacy group

- Formation: 1974
- Type: Non-profit organization
- Purpose: Latino civic engagement
- Location: Chicago, Illinois
- Key people: Maria Cerda, Sylvia Puente

The Latino Institute was a non-profit research and advocacy group based in Chicago, Illinois. It was best known for producing reports and analysis on the conditions faced by the Latino population, and studies of their economic and political potential.

It was founded in 1974 by a small group of activists with the help of Chicago Commons and Maria Cerda, a Puerto Rican woman and member of the Chicago Board of Education. The group also received a start-up grant from the Rockefeller Foundation. The group was founded to connect the various Latino ethnicities in Chicago, as well as to build connections between Latinos, African Americans and white people. The institute was politically non-partisan, and served the interests of Latinos in Chicago. The focus was to help Latino people in Chicago access public and private services, especially through information, community organizing, and civic involvement. The Institute carried out its mission through three divisions: Advocacy and Communications, Research and Documentation, and Training and Management Assistance. The Institute accepted charitable and corporate contributions and provided training and technical assistance to over 100 community organizations supporting Latinxs in Chicago.

The first main focus of the Latino Institute was bilingual education in the Chicago Public Schools. In 1979, to take advantage of funding opportunities in the Washington, D.C. area, the Latino Institute opened the Research Division of the Latino Institute in Reston, Virginia. On August 26, 1997, the Latino Institute launched the website Latino On-Line (www.latinoonline.org) to provide information to Latinos in the Chicago area.

In August, 1998, after 24 years of operation, the board of directors of the Latino Institute laid off its entire staff due to a budget deficit of over $350,000. Volunteers continued operations through the end of 1998. In the beginning of 1999, the Institute shared office space with the Latino Policy Forum (Latinos United). There was a plan to reopen the institute in 1999, but that plan did not come to fruition. DePaul University Special Collections and Archives holds the organizational records of the Latino Institute.

== See also ==
- Latino Policy Forum
