= Natalie Toro (politician) =

American politician

Member of the Illinois Senate from the 20th district
- In office July 10, 2023 – January 8, 2025
- Preceded by: Cristina Pacione-Zayas
- Succeeded by: Graciela Guzmán

Personal details
- Party: Democratic
- Education: Northeastern Illinois University (BA)

Natalie Toro is a former Democratic member of the Illinois Senate from the 20th district. She was sworn in on July 10, 2023. She was appointed to the vacancy created by the resignation of Cristina Pacione-Zayas.

== Illinois Senate ==
Toro was appointed to temporarily replace Cristina Pacione-Zayas in 2023, with a special election to be held in 2024 to fill the remainder of the term, after Pacione-Zayas left the Illinois Senate to join the administration of Chicago Mayor Brandon Johnson. In March 2024, Toro was defeated by Graciela Guzmán in the Democratic primary in advance of the special election.

== Election history ==
Cook County Board of Commissioners 8th District Primary Election, 2022
Party	Candidate	Votes	%
Democratic	Anthony Joel Quezada	8,882	35.00
Democratic	Luis Arroyo Jr. (incumbent)	4,902	19.31
Democratic	Natalie Toro	4,130	16.27
Democratic	Rory McHale	3,890	15.33
Democratic	Edwin Reyes	3,576	14.09
Total votes		25,380	100

Illinois 20th Senate District Primary Election, 2024
Party	Candidate	Votes	%
Democratic	Graciela Guzmán	11,618	50.16
Democratic	Natalie Toro (incumbent)	6,957	21.38
Democratic	Dave Nayak	3,590	15.50
Democratic	Geary Yonker	997	4.30
Total votes		23,162	100
