= Cheryl Hyman =

Academic administrator

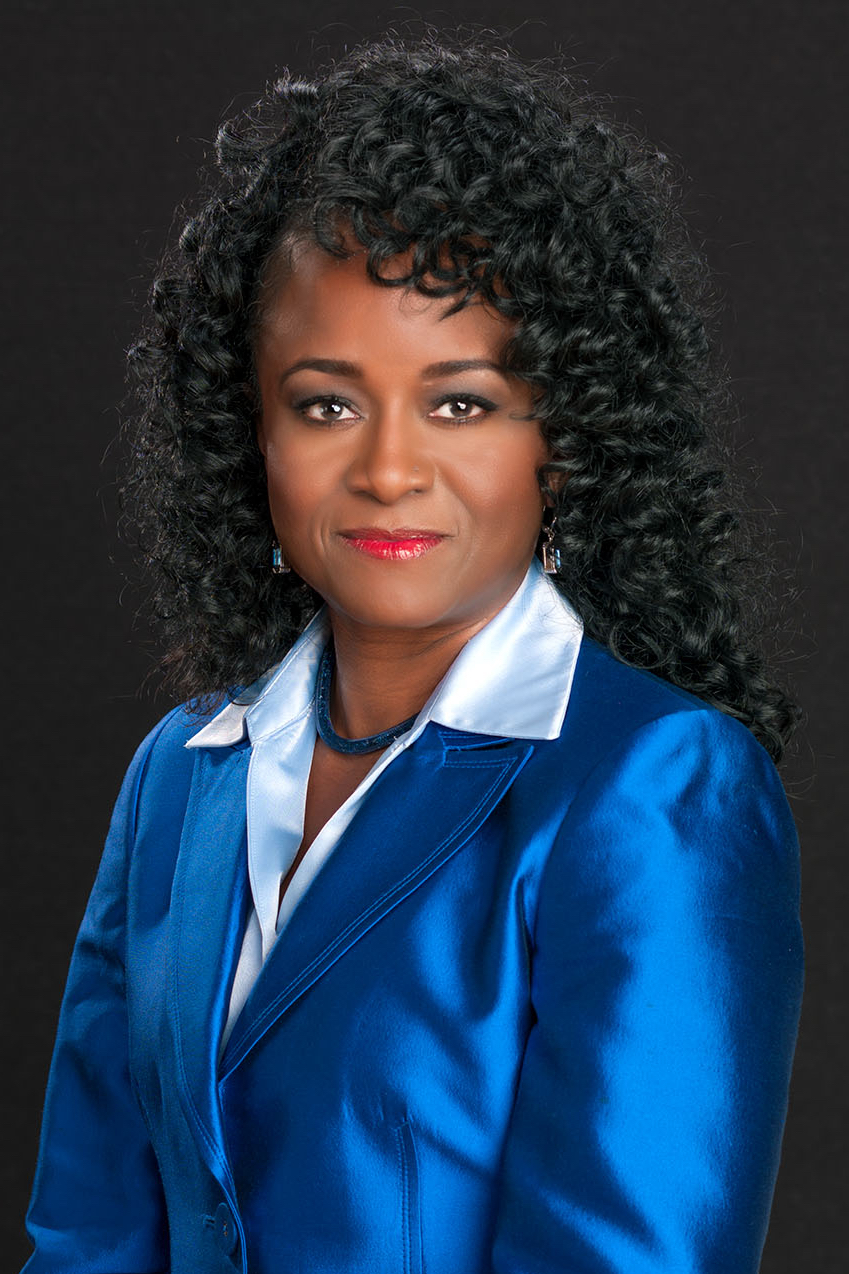
- Born: Cheryl L. Hyman; Chicago, Illinois, U.S.
- Education: Olive–Harvey College; Illinois Institute of Technology; Northwestern University; North Park University
- Known for: Director, Pathways Strategy, Gates Foundation, Former Vice Provost, Arizona State University, Former Chancellor of the City Colleges of Chicago
- Notable work: Reinvention: The Promise and Challenge of Transforming a Community College System
- Website: cherylhyman.com

Cheryl L. Hyman is the director of the Gates Foundation Pathways Strategy and the former vice provost for academic alliances at Arizona State University and former chancellor of City Colleges of Chicago. During her tenure at City Colleges of Chicago, she launched the Reinvention of City Colleges program in 2010, and the City Colleges' College to Careers program in 2011. She is also the author of Reinvention: The Promise and Challenge of Transforming a Community College System, and in 2023 was elected to the Illinois Institute of Technology Board of Trustees.

== Early life ==
Hyman was born in Chicago, Illinois. Hyman grew up on the West Side of Chicago in the Henry Horner Homes housing project later known for significant gang violence. She attended Orr High School, but dropped out due to the challenges of her home life. After returning to high school, graduating, and attending trade school she said she found herself "without a marketable credential and substantial student debt." She attended Olive–Harvey College, earning an associate degree and then transferred to the Illinois Institute of Technology, where she completed a bachelor's in computer science.

She also graduated from the Kellogg School of Management of Northwestern University with an Executive MBA, and received a Masters of Arts from North Park University in community development with a certification in non-profit management. After college, Hyman began working at Commonwealth Edison as a development analyst, later becoming the company's director of government and legislative affairs, and then the company's Vice President of strategy and business intelligence. She worked there for fourteen years, when she was selected by Chicago Mayor Richard M. Daley to serve as the Chancellor of the City Colleges of Chicago.

== City Colleges of Chicago ==
Hyman was appointed Chancellor of the City Colleges of Chicago on April 1, 2010. That year Hyman launched "Reinvention" at City Colleges of Chicago, a program designed to increase the number of students earning degrees of economic value, increase the transfer rate to four-year institutions, improve outcomes for students needing remediation, and increase the number of adult education and English as a second language students advancing to college-level courses. In 2011 Hyman worked with Mayor Rahm Emanuel to create the program College to Careers, which partnered the colleges with employers in an effort to address a skills gap in the City of Chicago's workforce.

In April 2013, delegates from the World Bank visited Mayor Rahm Emanuel and Hyman at Harold Washington College to learn more about how the City Colleges of Chicago partner with industries in the College to Careers program to evaluate its potential for use in other countries. In her position Hyman has also overseen a balanced budget at City Colleges in each year of her tenure, with The Chicago Civic Federation stating its budget was "a potential role model for other governments to emulate". In 2014, through a collaboration between Emanuel and Hyman, City Colleges of Chicago began offering the free tuition Chicago Star Scholarship for students who graduated from Chicago Public Schools with a GPA of 3.0, tested completion-ready in math and English, and enrolled in one of CCC's structured pathways. Hyman remained Chancellor until 2017.

== Writing ==
In 2018, Cheryl Hyman released the book Reinvention: The Promise and Challenge of Transforming a Community College System, published by Harvard Education Press.

== Arizona State University ==
Cheryl Hyman was named vice provost for academic alliances at Arizona State University in January 2019. She is currently chair of the Arizona Women in Higher Education (AWHE) executive board.

== Gates Foundation ==
Cheryl Hyman was named the director of the Gates Foundation Pathways Strategy in March 2025. Part of the foundation's postsecondary success program, the Pathways strategy focuses on ensuring that more students have access to clear, structured, and affordabe pathways to postsecondary credentials that lead to meaningful careers.
