= Latino Policy Forum =

- Formation: 1983
- Type: Non-profit organization
- Purpose: Latino civic engagement
- Location: Chicago, Illinois
- Services: Conducts analysis to inform, influence, and lead.
- Key people: Sylvia Puente, Martin Torres
- Website: http://www.latinopolicyforum.org
- Formerly called: Latinos United

The Latino Policy Forum is a non-profit organization that provides policy analysis and information and pursues more just housing, education, and immigration laws for the Latino community in Chicago and Illinois.

== History ==
The organization began in 1983 as the Housing Committee of Harold Washington's Mayor's Advisory Committee on Latino Affairs (MACLA). MACLA investigated the severe underrepresentation of Latinos in all forms of subsidized housing. In 1989, the organization incorporated and became Latinos United. Latinos United received support from another Chicago advocacy group, the Latino Institute, which provided office space and clerical services. In 2006, Latinos United expanded their purview to include education and immigration policy. Then, in 2008, the group formally adopted a broader policy agenda, and changed their name to the Latino Policy Forum.

== Chicago Housing Authority lawsuit ==
Latinos United gained importance by vanguarding the class action lawsuit against Chicago Housing Authority (CHA) and the U.S. Department of Housing and Urban Development for discriminatory practices. Latinos United accused CHA of not attracting Latinos to apply for housing assistance, then discouraging them after they applied. Latinos United also attacked CHA for not employing enough Latinos on their staff. CHA's administration denied these charges, but in 1996, CHA settled the lawsuit. The result was a federal consent decree, requiring CHA to increase their services to Latinos. The decree expired in 2005.

== Mission and actions ==
The mission of the Latino Policy Forum is: "to build the power, influence, and leadership of the Latino community through collective action to transform public policies that ensure the well being of our community and society as a whole." To that end, the Forum helped register thousands of people to vote, and they disseminate information on local and state candidates. The Latino Policy Forum also lobbies the Illinois State Legislature to promote legislation, particularly for fair housing measures.
