= Rey Colón =

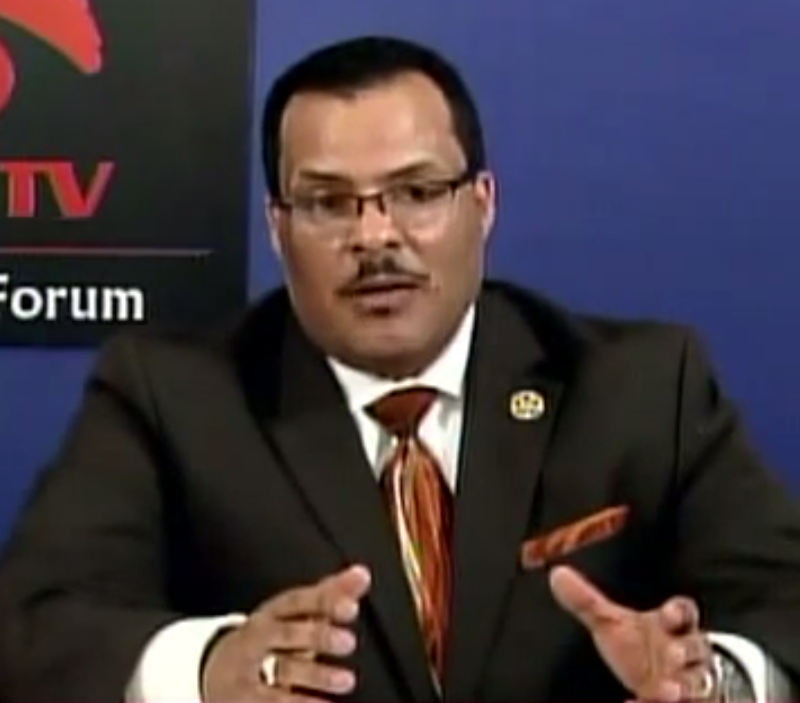
- Rey Colón responding to constituent questions on CAN TV

City of Chicago Alderman
- In office May 5, 2003 – May 18, 2015
- Preceded by: Vilma Colom
- Succeeded by: Carlos Ramirez-Rosa
- Constituency: 35th Ward, Chicago

Personal details
- Party: Democratic Party
- Education: Roosevelt University

Rey Colón was an alderman of the 35th Ward of the City of Chicago. He was first elected in 2003. He served three terms and was defeated in a reelection bid on February 24, 2015.

== Early history ==
Colón grew up in the Logan Square neighborhood. He graduated from Carl Schurz High School and Roosevelt University with a degree in Community Management.

== Public service ==
Before becoming alderman, Colón worked as Executive Director of the Boys and Girls Clubs of Chicago, Area Manager of the Chicago Park District, and Executive Director of YMCA of Metropolitan Chicago. While working with the McCormick YMCA in Logan Square, Colón raised $7.5 million and oversaw construction of the new YMCA.

== Aldermanic career ==
Colón ran for alderman unsuccessfully in 1999, but was encouraged by community leaders to run again. Colón's campaign was organized at the grassroots level against the incumbent candidate who had the support of powerful Chicago aldermen, the mayor, and the governor. Colón's campaign had a strong focus on community input about zoning issues. Colón was elected alderman of the 35th Ward in 2003. He organized a zoning committee to evaluate all the requests that come through the alderman's office.

Colón serves on six committees: Committees, Rules and Ethics; Economic, Capital, and Technology Development; Health; Human Relations; Special Events and Cultural Affairs; and Traffic Control and Safety.

Colón helped to secure Preliminary Landmark Designation for Logan, Kedzie, and Humboldt Boulevards.

Soon after he was first elected in 2003, Colón attracted controversy for allegedly using his zoning power as alderman to profit financially.

In August 2010, the Chicago Tribune reported that Colón was under investigation by state election officials and faced possible fines for failing to report $120,000 in campaign funds raised and $180,000 spent between 2007 through 2009.

Shortly after winning re-election in 2011, Colón abruptly announced a hearing to oppose waiving a permit fee for the Logan Square's Farmer's Market, which would have closed the weekly summerlong event. Colón stated that he was upset by political campaigning done at the market the previous summer; however, it was later reported that Colón's hearing was a personal retaliation against Paul Levin, the executive director of the Logan Square Chamber of Commerce, which oversees the market's operations. After newspapers and blogs picked up the story, Colón withdrew his request for a hearing and stated, "I’d like to urge those that are involved with the market to...keep it free of high-fructose corn syrup, free of pesticides and free of political activity."

In June 2011, Colón and the city council passed a measure to establish free parking along parts of Logan, Kedzie and Humboldt Boulevards. Although Colón indicated that he believed the measure would promote economic development, some residents opposed the measure, citing congestion and concerns about the neighborhood atmosphere. Many were upset the measure was passed without any community input. In the city's March 2012 elections, 88% of voting residents approved a referendum to end Colón's parking plan; despite the result, the parking rules were not changed.

In 2011, EZPAWN, a publicly traded company (NASDAQ: EZPW) and the largest pawn-shop operator in the world by market capitalization, proposed a new store at 3711 West Fullerton. Colón did not stop the store, despite significant neighborhood opposition and no community input. Colón said, "this national business will not have a negative impact and will provide an added benefit despite the outdated perceptions. Yes, I will support the special use and will continue to increase the variety of businesses in the community. That's the word." During zoning hearings, EZPAWN committed to hiring 10 people from the community and to participating in neighborhood organizations.

In January 2012, Colón was removed from the March 20 primary ballot for Democratic ward committeeman because he did not collect enough valid signatures from registered voters in the 35th Ward. The validity of 162 of his collected signatures were challenged, and they were consequently rejected.

Affordable housing advocates have criticized Colón for accepting campaign contributions from and collaborating closely with noted real-estate developer, Mark Fishman, because of his company's questionable management and development practices in the Logan Square neighborhood.

In 2013, Colón joined the Paul Douglas Alliance caucus.

In July 2014, Colón was arrested for driving while intoxicated on the Eisenhower Expressway. He was also found to have an expired drivers license.

On February 24, 2015, Colón was defeated in his bid for reelection by community activist Carlos Ramirez-Rosa.

== Personal life ==
Alderman Colón lives with his fiancée Martha Ramos (who is also his chief of staff), and his two daughters.
