= Roberto Clemente Community Academy =

High School in Chicago, Illinois

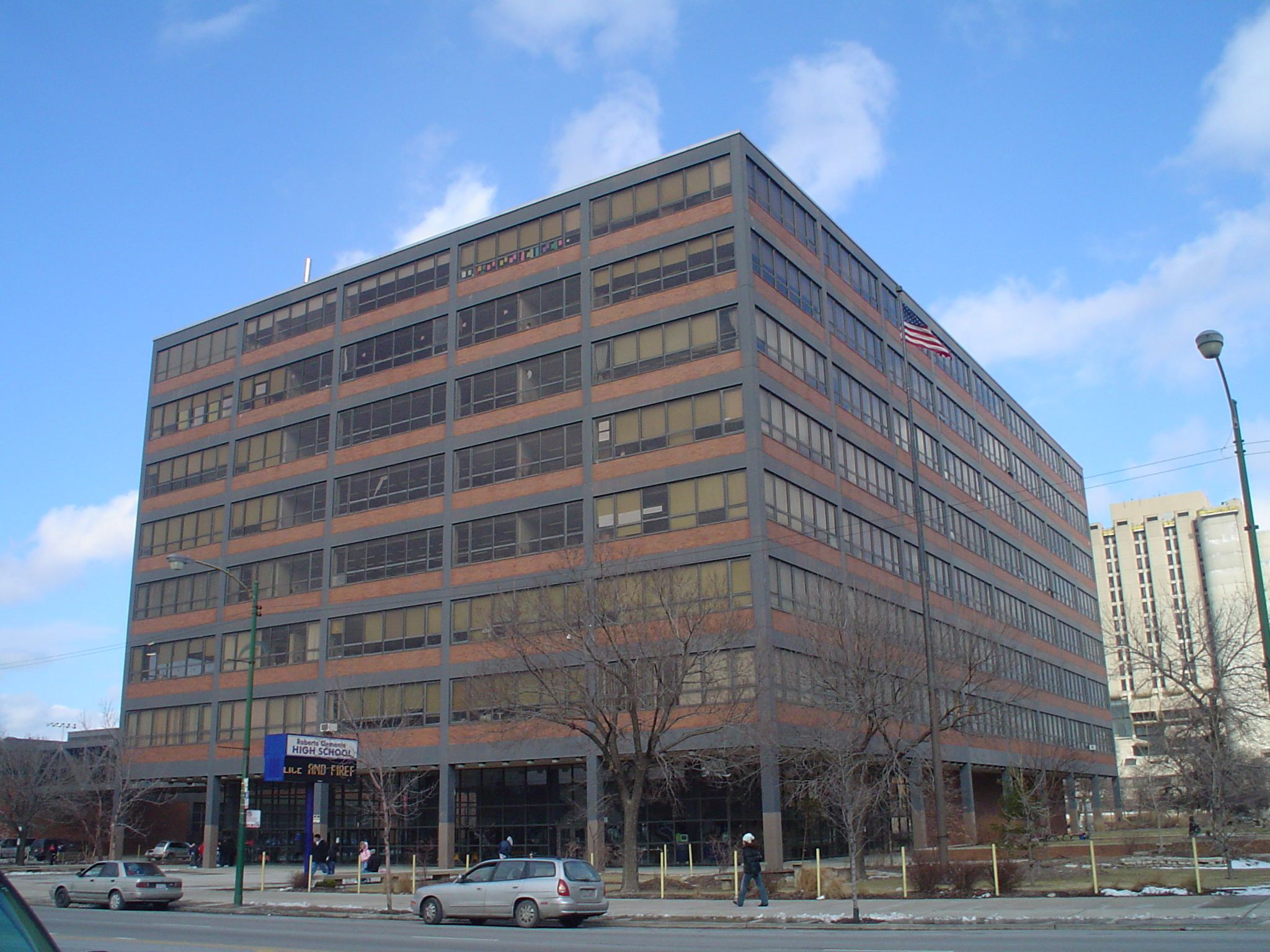

Location
- 1147 N. Western Avenue; Chicago, Illinois 60622; United States; 41.9026°N 87.6861°W

Information
- Former names: Northwest Division High School (1892–1906); Tuley High School (1906–1974)
- School type: Public Secondary
- Established: 1974
- School district: Chicago Public Schools
- CEEB code: 141325
- Principal: Devon Morales
- Grades: 9–12
- Gender: Coed
- Enrollment: 697 (2018–19)
- Campus type: Urban
- Colors: Blue; Gold
- Athletics conference: Chicago Public League
- Team name: Wildcats
- Accreditation: North Central Association of Colleges and Schools
- Website: rccachicago.org

Roberto Clemente Community Academy (commonly known as Clemente, Roberto Clemente High School) is a public four-year high school located in the West Town community area of Chicago, Illinois. Operated by the Chicago Public Schools, the school is named for Puerto Rican baseball player Roberto Enrique Clemente (1934–1972).

Gina M. Pérez, the author of The Near Northwest Side Story: Migration, Displacement, and Puerto Rican Families, wrote that in Chicago the school is known as "the Puerto Rican high school". Jennifer Domino Rudolph, author of Embodying Latino Masculinities: Producing Masculatinidad wrote that the school "is strongly associated with Puerto Rican cultural nationalism". Ana Y. Ramos-Zayas, author of National Performances: The Politics of Class, Race, and Space in Puerto Rican Chicago, wrote that the school was portrayed in the media as "the property of Puerto Rican nationalists" and "as part of Puerto Rico." Rudolph stated that media depictions of violence from Puerto Rican nationalism movements caused the school to become controversial, and that the school was associated with much of the "backlash against manifestations of Puerto Rican identity." According to Pérez, as of 2004, most West Town area residents have a sense of pride in the school, while also lamenting issues common in Chicago public schools that appear at Clemente, such as gangs and school violence, dropouts, and low test scores.

== History ==
The school was established in 1892 as Northwest Division High School. It was renamed Tuley High School in 1906. In 1974, the school moved to a new facility across the street named Roberto Clemente High School. Overcrowding was the reason why the old Tuley building closed. The students had demanded that the school be renamed after Clemente, as well as asking for the removal of the existing curriculum and principal when they had the school closed in 1973. At the time approximately 53% of the students were of Puerto Rican ancestry. The principal, Herbert Fink left his position. By November 1974 there was another demonstration protesting against the removals of teachers.

=== 1990s ===
Circa 1988, Clemente High established a new curriculum that was centered around students and involved participation from parents and multiculturalism. Parents and area community activists shaped the school's curriculum in a manner of the traditional American education system. In addition, the school hired parents as mentors, hall monitors, office workers, and tutors. The school added a legal clinic to assist parents, students, and immigrants.

In the 1990s, Chicago-area media began to criticize the Clemente parents and activists. This unfolded as the Personal Responsibility and Work Opportunity Act was passed in 1996. Persons in the media accused some area parents of stealing money because the school paid them $20 for volunteer work even though they were also on welfare; this is despite the welfare reform act's stated goal to encourage those on welfare to work. Other schools in Chicago enacted reforms similar to those at Clemente, which had reduced dropout rates by over 10%.

Circa 1995, Chicago area local and Illinois state officials accused the school of using an Illinois aid program to send students to Puerto Rico to attend a radical political campus, fund flights for performers and speakers favoring Puerto Rico being politically independent of the United States, and to provide money for a pro-Puerto Rican independence fundraiser. In 1996, CPS launched an investigation into mismanagement of money. In 1995 and 1996, respectively, it had placed Clemente on financial, and then academic probation. In November 1996, a CPS evaluation of Clemente stated, "the political climate and divisiveness thwart academic progress at a level so significant that the education of the students is being ignored."

On January 31, 1997, Jerry Anderson, an administrator at Homewood-Flossmoor High School and potential candidate for principal at Clemente, decided to decline the position at Clemente after receiving a letter asking her to call "your boss" for the FALN and telephone calls asking her to meet leaders of the area Puerto Rican community; she stated that, "I didn't think politics should have any part in education." She also stated that on February 1, 1997, she received a death threat on her answering machine. As a result, CPS head Paul G. Vallas notified the Federal Bureau of Investigation (FBI), and Edgar Lopez, the chairperson of a committee named by the speaker of the Illinois House of Representatives to look into the school, accused it of being "controlled by radicals" and asked for it to be broken into smaller schools.

In February 1997, Irene DaMota, the principal of Whittier Elementary School, was selected as the new Clemente principal.

==== Chicago Sun-Times story ====
A February 4, 1997, article in the Chicago Sun-Times, "School funds used to push terrorist' release," had accused the school of promoting the release of terrorists. It quoted a CPS report stating that school funds were used to promote the release of the terrorist and for Puerto Rican independence movements, and that the American flag was banned from some classrooms.

The director of the Chicago Latino Institute, Migdalia Rivera, criticized the story and distributed a rebuttal. In response, the newspaper defended its reporting.

An area political strategist and businessperson, Larry Ligas, a person not of Puerto Rican origin, claimed credit for spearheading the story. He said he got information, much of it from former Puerto Rican independence movement propagandist, Rafael Marrero, and gave it to Sun-Times journalist Michelle Campbell. Campbell verified what Ligas sent her and added some information of her own. Ligas posted a press release praising the Sun-Times story prior to its release. Ben Joravsky of the Chicago Reader stated that Ligas was "relatively unknown" at the time of the story's release. Marrero, at the time, was an informant for the Federal Bureau of Investigation (FBI). He had been trying to sabotage the Juan Antonio Corretjer Puerto Rican Cultural Center, which had a working relationship with Clemente. Marrero would later give testimony in which he accused parties of perpetrating fraud.

In regards to the story itself, Joravsky stated that at the time the story was released, people in northwest Chicago were speculating about who was responsible for spearheading the story and not so much about its veracity; in regards to that, Joravsky stated that the latter was "a point of view that varies with one's ideology."

On February 12, 1997, a group of Puerto Ricans and other Hispanics and Latinos protested at the Sun-Times offices, accusing the newspaper of anti-Latino bias and racism.

On February 18, CPS head Vallas stated that Illinois lawmakers needed to be more stringent with rules regarding spending of funds intended for poor children. Vallas criticized the programs of Clemente and the Puerto Rican center. Even though there is no concrete evidence stating that the school had associations with the Fuerzas Armadas de Liberación Nacional Puertorriqueña (FALN), at one time the FBI accused it of doing so. The FBI had asked for an investigation, and so did the US attorney based in Chicago. Several hearings were held in the Illinois Legislature.

Ultimately, no evidence of any fraud surfaced. Oscar López Rivera wrote that Marrero "wreaked havoc on the hard community work the Center had carried out at Clemente High School for years."

=== 2000s and beyond ===
Clemente was one of 16 schools nationwide selected by the College Board for inclusion in the EXCELerator School Improvement Model program beginning the 2007-2008 school year. The project was funded by the Bill & Melinda Gates Foundation.

The school was scheduled to begin using the International Baccalaureate program by the 2013-2014 school year.

== Student body ==
As of 2019, the school had 697 students, with significant numbers of Puerto Rican Americans, African Americans, and Mexican Americans, and other groups of Hispanic and Latino Americans and Eastern European Americans. In 1997, it had had 2,400 students.

== Academics and programs ==
Clemente offers six Advanced Placement classes and is also an International Baccalaureate candidate school. Clemente also has vocational education programs that focus on culinary arts and radio/television broadcasting. The latter program is taught by a journalist from Chicago's WGN-AM radio station. In addition, students may participate in JROTC. In 2012, 92.6% of Clemente freshmen were classified as on-track to graduate.

As of 2004, the school curriculum stresses multiculturalism and aims to develop ethnic pride.

It hosts community events, such as speaking engagements and cultural programs, available to everyone in the surrounding area.

As of 2004, Clemente had a relationship with the Puerto Rican Cultural Center's Pedro Albizu Campos Alternative High School; it had once used Campos as an alternate site. Clemente also has partnerships with Vida/SIDA and the ASPIRA Association.

== Campus ==
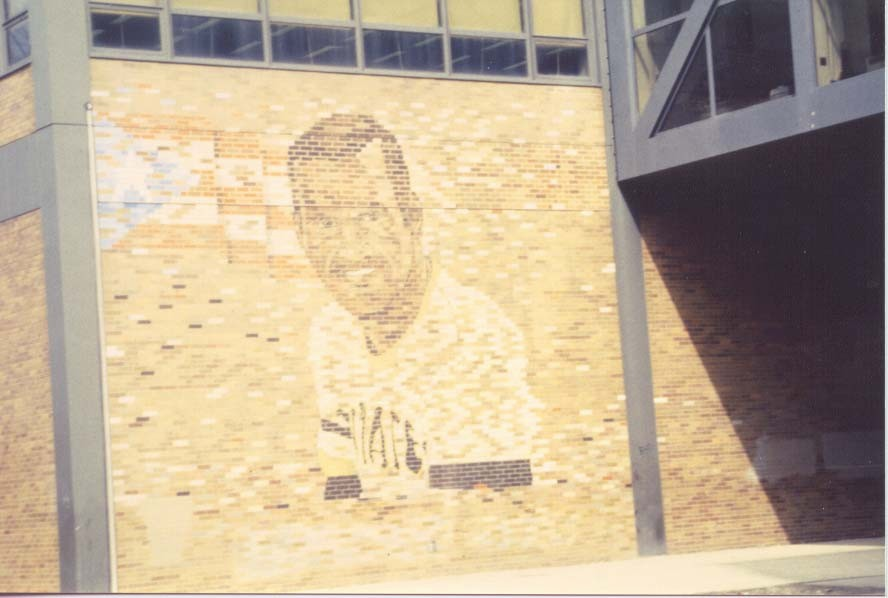
Mural of Roberto Clemente at the school

The school includes various murals along Division Street which portray symbols of Puerto Rican culture and Puerto Rican nationalism.

== Student performance ==
Circa 2005, the school had one of the highest dropout rates in the United States. By 2019, the graduation rate was 84%.

== Athletics ==
Clemente competes in the Chicago Public League (CPL) and is a member of the Illinois High School Association (IHSA). The boys' baseball team were public league champions 9 times (1973–74, 1978–79, 1980–81, 1981–82, 1987–88, 1988–89, 1994–95, 1996–97 and 2001–02). From 1973 to 2005, the team won ten Chicago baseball championships and Wilfredo Cruz, author of Puerto Rican Chicago, described the team as "formidable."

== Notable alumni ==
- William Karush, attended Tuley High School, best known for contributions to Karush-Kuhn-Tucker conditions
- Saul Bellow, attended Tuley High School; recipient of the Nobel Prize in Literature.
- Joey Marciano, baseball player
- Isaac Rosenfeld, writer who became a prominent member of New York intellectual circles. Saul Bellow modeled the character King Dahfu in Henderson the Rain King on Rosenfeld who he befriended and worked with on the school newspaper at Tuley.
- Victor Diaz, professional baseball player with the New York Mets and Texas Rangers
- Ramon Ocasio III, Cook County judge and president of the Puerto Rican Bar Association of Illinois.
- Mickey Rottner, attended Tuley High School; played basketball for Loyola and professionally.

== See also ==
- Chicago Public Schools
- List of schools in Chicago Public Schools
- Puerto Ricans in Chicago
