= 2023 Chicago elections =

- February 28 and April 4, 2023

The 2023 Chicago elections took place in two rounds on February 28, 2023, and April 4, 2023. Elections were held for Mayor of Chicago, City Clerk of Chicago, City Treasurer of Chicago, all 50 members of the Chicago City Council, and 66 members of the newly created police District Councils. The elections were administered by the Chicago Board of Elections.

== Mayor ==
Incumbent Mayor Lori Lightfoot ran for re-election, and faced eight challengers: Kam Buckner (member of Illinois House of Representatives), Willie Wilson (businessman and perennial candidate), Roderick Sawyer (member of the Chicago City Council), Sophia King (member of the Chicago City Council), Ja'Mal Green (community activist), Paul Vallas (former CEO of Chicago Public Schools), Brandon Johnson (member of the Cook County Board of Commissioners), and Jesus "Chuy" García (U.S. Representative from Illinois's 4th congressional district).

Candidates who expressed interest but ultimately declined to run include Arne Duncan (former U.S. Secretary of Education), Mike Quigley (U.S. Representative from Illinois's 5th congressional district), and John Catanzara (president of Lodge 7 of the Fraternal Order of Police). News reports suggested the following prospective candidates, who all eventually declined to run: La Shawn Ford (member of Illinois House of Representatives), Stacy Davis Gates, and Melissa Conyears-Ervin.

In the first round, Vallas and Johnson won 32.9% and 21.6% of the vote respectively and advanced to the run-off election. In the run-off election on April 4, 2023, Johnson received 52.16% and Vallas received 47.84% of the vote.

== City Clerk ==
Chicago City Clerk election, 2023
- February 28, 2023
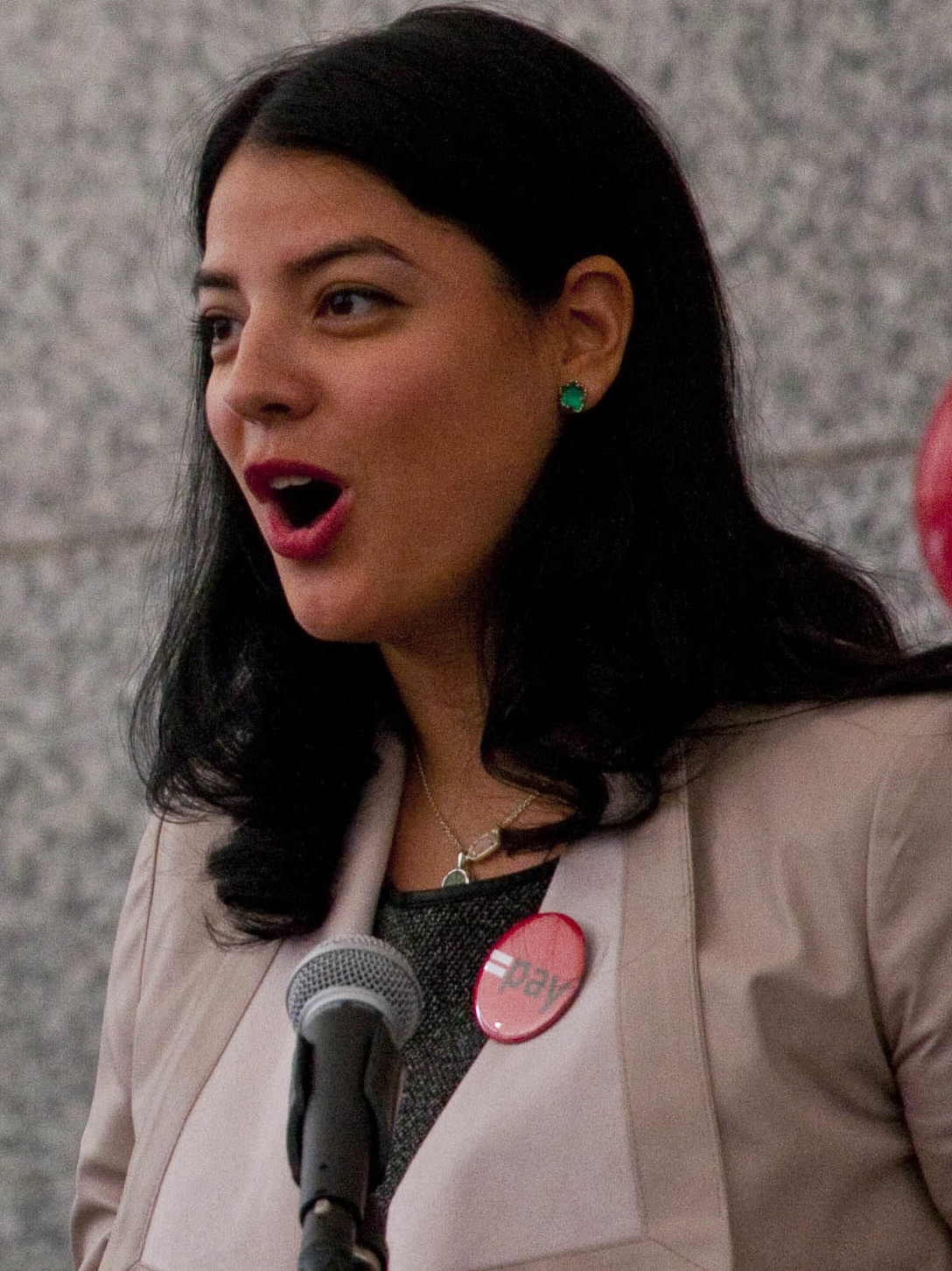
Candidate	Anna M. Valencia
Popular vote	457,007
Percentage	100%
Clerk before election
Anna M. Valencia
Democratic
Elected Clerk
Anna M. Valencia

Incumbent City Clerk Anna Valencia ran uncontested for a second full term and a third overall term. She was first appointed to office in 2017, and elected outright in 2019.

=== Results ===
2023 Chicago City Clerk election
Candidate	Votes	%
Anna M. Valencia (incumbent)	457,007	100%
Total votes	457,007	100%

== City Treasurer ==
Chicago City Treasurer election, 2023
- February 28, 2023
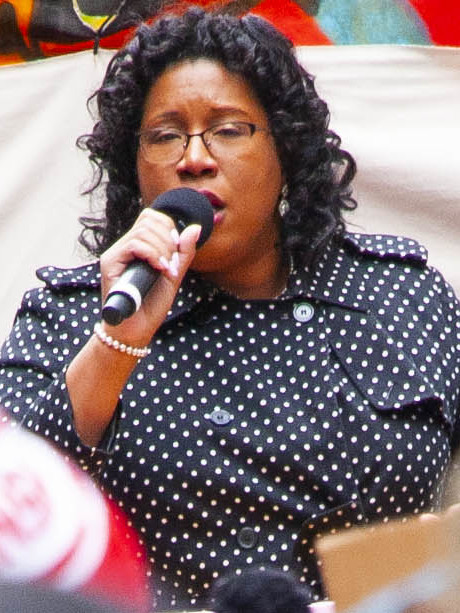
Candidate	Melissa Conyears-Ervin
Popular vote	442,553
Percentage	100%
Treasurer before election
Melissa Conyears-Ervin
Democratic
Elected Treasurer
TBD

Incumbent City Treasurer Melissa Conyears-Ervin ran uncontested for a second full-term. She was first elected in 2019.

2023 Chicago City Treasurer election results
Candidate	Votes	%
Melissa Conyears-Ervin (incumbent)	442,553	100%
Total votes	442,553	100%

== City Council ==
All 50 seats in the City Council were up for election. This was the first City Council election following redistricting based on the results of the 2020 United States census.

== Police District Councils ==
Elections were held for 22 newly created police district councils, one for each of the city's police districts. The district councils were created by a police reform ordinance passed in July 2021. The councils will have police oversight responsibilities within their district, and council members will nominate 14 candidates for the city-wide Commission for Public Safety and Accountability, from which seven will be selected and confirmed by the mayor and City Council.
