= 2022 Illinois Secretary of State election =

- November 8, 2022
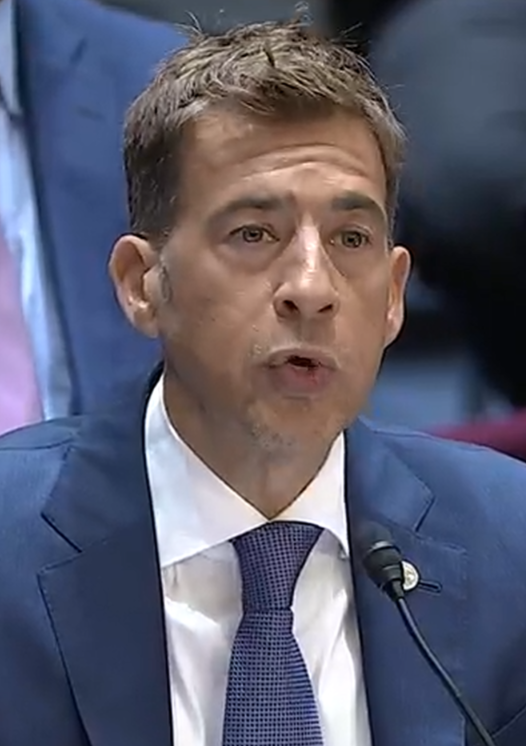

Nominee	Alexi Giannoulias	Dan Brady
Party	Democratic	Republican
Popular vote	2,220,713	1,783,070
Percentage	54.28%	43.59%
- Giannoulias: 40–50% 50–60% 60–70% 70–80% 80–90% >90% Brady: 40–50% 50–60% 60–70% 70–80% 80–90% >90% Tie: 40–50%
Secretary of State before election
Jesse White
Democratic
Elected Secretary of State
Alexi Giannoulias
Democratic

The 2022 Illinois Secretary of State election was held on November 8, 2022, to elect the next Illinois Secretary of State. Incumbent Democrat Jesse White did not seek re-election to a seventh term. Alexi Giannoulias, a former state treasurer, won the open seat.

== Background ==
The primaries and general elections coincided with those for federal congressional races, the state's U.S. Senate race, and those for other state offices. The election was part of the 2022 Illinois elections.

The primary election was held on June 28. The general election was held on November 8, 2022.

== Democratic primary ==
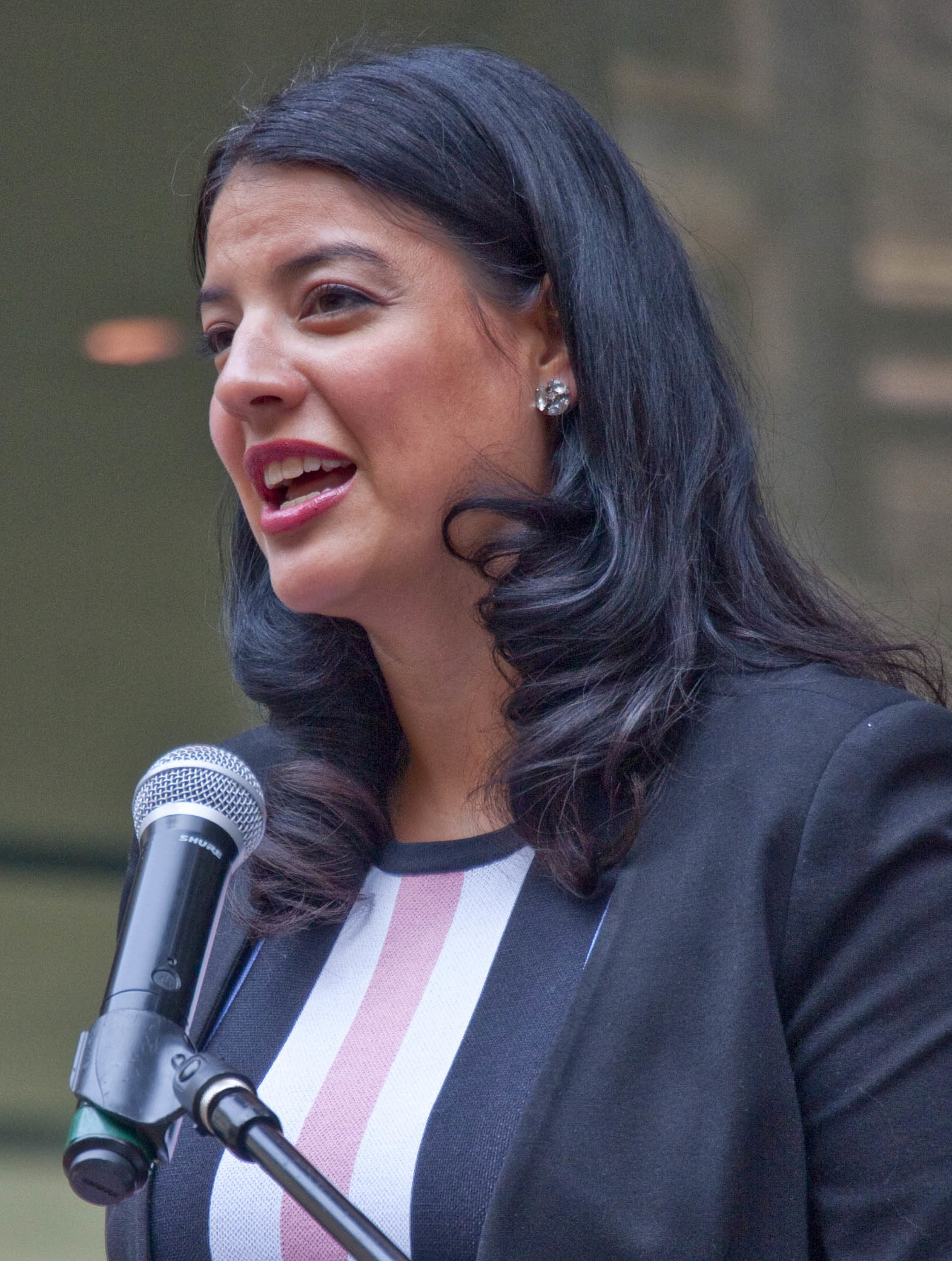
Chicago City Clerk Anna Valencia finished second in the primary.

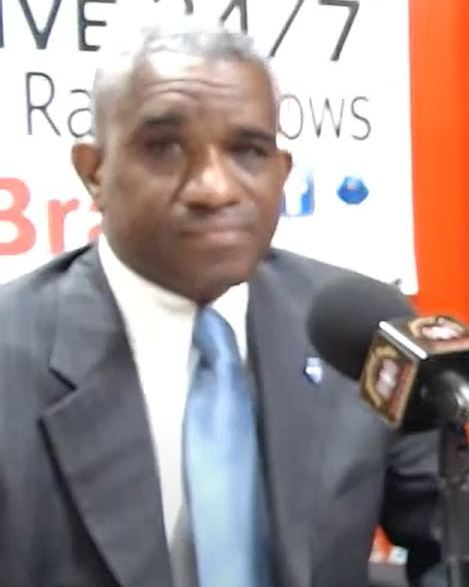
Chicago alderman David Moore finished third in the primary.

=== Candidates ===
==== Nominee ====
- Alexi Giannoulias, former Illinois state treasurer and nominee for United States Senate in 2010

==== Eliminated in primary ====
- David Moore, Chicago alder from the 17th ward
- Sidney Moore
- Anna Valencia, City Clerk of Chicago

==== Withdrawn ====
- Pat Dowell, Chicago alder from the 3rd ward (running for Illinois' 1st congressional district) (endorsed Giannoulias)
- Michael Hastings, state senator

==== Declined ====
- Walter Burnett Jr., an incumbent member of the Chicago City Council from Chicago's 27th ward
- Mike Frerichs, incumbent Illinois State Treasurer (running for reelection)
- Susana Mendoza, incumbent Illinois Comptroller (running for reelection)
- Juliana Stratton, incumbent Lieutenant Governor of Illinois (running for reelection) (endorsed Anna Valencia)
- Jesse White, incumbent Secretary of State (endorsed Anna Valencia)
- Karen Yarbrough, Cook County clerk, former Cook County recorder of deeds, and former state representative

=== Endorsements ===
Pat Dowell (withdrawn)

Federal officials

- Carol Moseley Braun, former U.S. Senator from Illinois and former United States ambassador to New Zealand
- Danny K. Davis, U.S. Representative from Illinois's 7th congressional district

State legislators

- Kam Buckner, state representative since 2019
- Mattie Hunter, state senator since 2003
- Lamont Robinson, state representative since 2019

Local officeholders

- Carrie Austin, Chicago alderman since 1994
- Derrick Curtis, Chicago alderman since 2015
- Jason Ervin, Chicago alderman since 2011
- Emma Mitts, Chicago alderman since 2000
- Roderick Sawyer, Chicago alderman since 2011
- Chris Taliaferro, Chicago alderman since 2015
- Scott Waguespack, Chicago alderman since 2007
Alexi Giannoulias

U.S. Senators

- Carol Moseley Braun, former U.S. Senator from Illinois and former United States ambassador to New Zealand

U.S. Representatives

- Jerry Costello, former U.S. Representative for Illinois's 21st congressional district (1988–1993) and Illinois's 12th congressional district (1993–2013)
- Jesús "Chuy" García, U.S. Representative for Illinois's 4th congressional district
- Luis Gutiérrez, former U.S. Representative for Illinois's 4th congressional district
- Robin Kelly, U.S. Representative for Illinois's 2nd congressional district and chair of the Illinois Democratic Party
- Raja Krishnamoorthi, U.S. Representative for Illinois's 8th congressional district
- Mike Quigley, U.S. Representative for Illinois's 5th congressional district (2009–)
- Bobby Rush, U.S. Representative for Illinois's 1st congressional district
- Jan Schakowsky, U.S. Representative for Illinois's 9th congressional district

State executives

- Eleni Kounalakis, Lieutenant Governor of California

State legislators

- Barbara Hernandez, state representative
- Mattie Hunter, state senator
- Emil Jones Jr., former President of the Illinois Senate
- Ram Villivalam, state senator

Local officials

- Howard Brookins, Chicago alderman
- Pat Dowell, Chicago alderwoman
- Toni Preckwinkle, President of the Cook County Board of Commissioners
- Chris Taliaferro, Chicago alderman

Newspapers

- Chicago Tribune
- Daily Herald

Labor unions

- Illinois Federation of Teachers
- Illinois International Alliance of Theatrical Stage Employees
- Service Employees International Union Illinois State Council
- United Food and Commercial Workers Locals 881 and 1546

Organizations

- Cook County Democratic Party
- Our Revolution Illinois
David Moore

U.S. Representatives

- Danny K. Davis, U.S. Representative from Illinois's 7th congressional district (1996–)

Local officials

- Dick Simpson, former Chicago alderman from the 44th ward (1971–1979)
Anna Valencia

U.S. Senators

- Tammy Duckworth, U.S. Senator from Illinois
- Dick Durbin, U.S. Senator from Illinois

U.S. Representatives

- Lauren Underwood, U.S. Representative from Illinois's 14th congressional district

Governors

- J. B. Pritzker, incumbent Governor of Illinois

State officeholders

- Juliana Stratton, incumbent Lieutenant Governor of Illinois
- Jesse White, incumbent Illinois Secretary of State

State legislators

- Kelly Cassidy, state representative since 2011
- James Clayborne Jr., former Illinois State Senate Majority Leader
- Maura Hirschauer, state representative since 2021
- Toi Hutchinson, former state senator, Senior Adviser to Gov. Pritzker
- Michelle Mussman, state representative since 2011
- Janet Yang Rohr, state representative since 2021
- Ann Williams, state representative (2011–)
- Kathleen Willis, state representative since 2013

Local officeholders

- Melissa Conyears-Ervin, City Treasurer of Chicago
- Maria Hadden, Chicago Alderwoman since 2019
- Janice K. Jackson, former CEO of Chicago Public Schools
- Donna Johnson, Mayor of Libertyville since 2021

Labor unions

- Associated Fire Fighters of Illinois (AFFI)
- Bricklayers and Allied Craftworkers (BAC) Administrative District Council 1
- Illinois Association of Heat and Frost and Allied Workers Local 1
- International Union of Painters and Allied Trades (IUPAT) Local 14 and Local 58
- Unite Here Local 1
- United Steelworkers Local 1899

Organizations

- Democratic Party of the 49th Ward
- Emily's List
- Illinois Education Association
- Latino Victory Fund
- Planned Parenthood of Illinois Action

=== Forum ===
2022 Illinois Secretary of State Democratic primary candidate fourm
No.	Date	Host	Moderator	Link	Democratic	Democratic	Democratic	Democratic
Key: P Participant A Absent N Not invited I Invited W Withdrawn								
Key: P Participant A Absent N Not invited I Invited W Withdrawn					Alexi Giannoulias	David Moore	Sidney Moore	Anna Valencia
1	May 27, 2022	Union League Club of Chicago	Craig; Dellimore	YouTube	P	P	N	P

=== Polling ===
Poll source	Date(s) administered	Sample size (Note: Key: A – all adults RV – registered voters LV – likely voters V – unclear)	Margin of error	Alexi Giannoulias	David Moore	Anna Valencia	Other	Undecided
Global Strategy Group (D) (Note: This poll was sponsored by Valencia's campaign.)	January 5–10, 2022	600 (LV)	± 4.0%	13%	12%	13%	4%	58%
Ogden & Fry (R)	December 2021	400 (LV)	± 5.0%	18%	2%	7%	4% (Note: Dowell with 4%)	69%

=== Results ===
Results by county Giannoulias: 30–40%; 40–50%; 50–60%; 60–70%; Valencia: 40–50%

Democratic primary results
Party	Candidate	Votes	%
Democratic	Alexi Giannoulias	452,221	52.12%
Democratic	Anna M. Valencia	303,671	35.00%
Democratic	David H. Moore	77,983	8.99%
Democratic	Sidney Moore	33,762	3.89%
Total votes		867,637	100.0%

== Republican primary ==
=== Candidates ===
==== Nominee ====
- Dan Brady, state representative since 2001

==== Eliminated in primary ====
- John C. Milhiser, former United States Attorney for the Central District of Illinois

==== Endorsements ====
Dan Brady

U.S. Representatives

- Mike Bost, U.S. Representative for Illinois's 12th congressional district
- Rodney Davis, U.S. Representative for Illinois's 13th congressional district
- Darin LaHood, U.S. Representative for Illinois's 18th congressional district

State legislators

- Jim Durkin, minority leader of the Illinois House of Representatives
- Chris Miller, state representative

Newspapers

- Chicago Tribune
- Daily Herald

Organizations

- Illinois Fraternal Order of Police State Lodge

=== Polling ===
Poll source	Date(s) administered	Sample size	Margin of error	Dan Brady	John Milhiser	Undecided
Ogden & Fry (R)	June 24, 2022	518 (LV)	± 4.4%	42%	18%	39%
Ogden & Fry (R)	June 11–12, 2022	662 (LV)	± 3.9%	32%	17%	51%
Public Policy Polling (D)	June 6–7, 2022	677 (LV)	± 3.8%	29%	13%	58%

=== Results ===
Results by county Brady: 50–60%; 60–70%; 70–80%; 80–90%; Milhiser: 60–70%

Republican primary results
Party	Candidate	Votes	%
Republican	Dan Brady	550,700	76.36%
Republican	John C. Milhiser	170,496	23.64%
Total votes		721,196	100.0%

== Libertarian convention ==
=== Withdrew after winning nomination ===
- Jesse White, automotive factory worker (no relation to incumbent Jesse White)

=== Replacement candidate ===
- Jon Stewart, former professional wrestler and candidate for Governor of Illinois in 2018 (no relation to talk show host Jon Stewart)

== General election ==
=== Forum ===
2022 Illinois Secretary of State pre-primary candidate forum
No.	Date	Host	Moderator	Link	Republican	Democratic	Democratic	Democratic
Key: P Participant A Absent N Not invited I Invited W Withdrawn								
Key: P Participant A Absent N Not invited I Invited W Withdrawn					Dan Brady	Alexi Giannoulias	David Moore	Anna Valencia
1	Oct. 17, 2022	CAN TV	Sylvia Snowden	YouTube	P	P	P	P

=== Predictions ===
Source	Ranking	As of
Sabato's Crystal Ball	Safe D	December 1, 2021
Elections Daily	Safe D	November 7, 2022

=== Post-primary endorsements ===
Alexi Giannoulias (D)

Labor unions

- United Mine Workers

=== Polling ===
Poll source	Date(s) administered	Sample size	Margin of error	Alexi Gianoulias (D)	Dan Brady (R)	Other	Undecided
Emerson College	October 20–24, 2022	1,000 (LV)	± 3.0%	48%	39%	4% (Note: Stewart (L) with 3%; "Someone else" with 1%)	9%
Victory Geek (D)	August 25–28, 2022	512 (LV)	± 4.3%	55%	37%	–	8%
Ogden & Fry (R)	June 26, 2021	445 (LV)	± 4.3%	44%	39%	–	18%

=== Results ===
2022 Illinois Secretary of State election
Party	Candidate	Votes	%	±%
Democratic	Alexi Giannoulias	2,220,713	54.28%	−13.98%
Republican	Dan Brady	1,783,070	43.59%	+14.36%
Libertarian	Jon Stewart	87,092	2.13%	−0.38%
Write-in		73	0.0%	N/A
Total votes		4,090,948	100.0%	
Democratic hold				

==== By congressional district ====
Giannoulias won 13 of 17 congressional districts, with the remaining four going to Brady, including one that elected a Democrat.

District	Giannoulias	Brady	Representative
1st	68%	30%	Bobby Rush (117th Congress)
1st	68%	30%	Jonathan Jackson (118th Congress)
2nd	66%	32%	Robin Kelly
3rd	68%	30%	Marie Newman (117th Congress)
3rd	68%	30%	Delia Ramirez (118th Congress)
4th	69%	29%	Chuy García
5th	69%	30%	Mike Quigley
6th	54%	44%	Sean Casten
7th	84%	13%	Danny Davis
8th	55%	43%	Raja Krishnamoorthi
9th	70%	28%	Jan Schakowsky
10th	60%	38%	Brad Schneider
11th	54%	44%	Bill Foster
12th	25%	72%	Mike Bost
13th	53%	45%	Nikki Budzinski
14th	52%	46%	Lauren Underwood
15th	28%	70%	Mary Miller
16th	32%	65%	Darin LaHood
17th	47%	51%	Cheri Bustos (117th Congress)
17th	47%	51%	Eric Sorensen (118th Congress)

== Notes ==
Partisan clients
