= 2027 Chicago elections =

- February 27 and April 6, 2027

The 2027 Chicago elections will take place in two rounds on February 27, 2027, with runoffs on April 6, 2027, if necessary. Elections will be held for Mayor of Chicago, City Clerk of Chicago, City Treasurer of Chicago, all 50 members of the Chicago City Council, and 66 members of the police District Councils. The elections will be administered by the Chicago Board of Elections.

== Mayor ==
Incumbent mayor Brandon Johnson is running for re-election.

== City Clerk ==
Chicago City Clerk election, 2027
- February 27, 2027
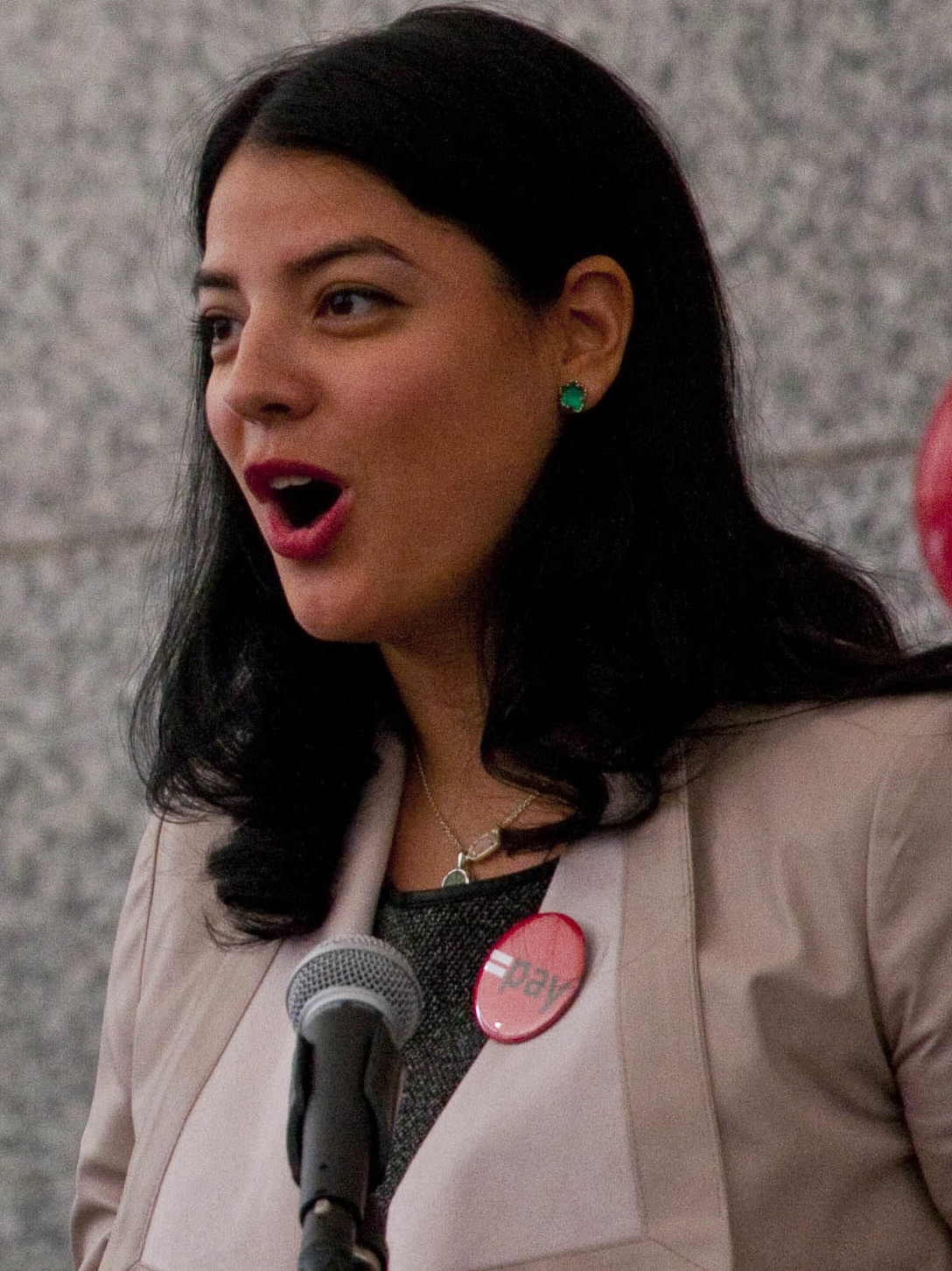
Candidate	Anna Valencia
Clerk before election
Anna Valencia
Democratic
Elected Clerk
TBD

Incumbent city clerk Anna Valencia is running for re-election.

=== Candidates ===
- Anna Valencia, incumbent city clerk

=== Results ===
2027 Chicago City Clerk election
Candidate	Votes	%
Anna Valencia (incumbent)		
Total votes		

== City Treasurer ==
Chicago City Treasurer election, 2027
- February 27, 2027
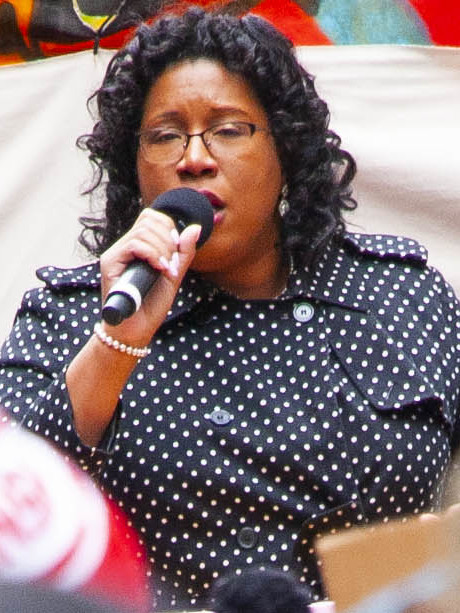

Candidate	Melissa Conyears-Ervin	Bruce Leon
Treasurer before election
Melissa Conyears-Ervin
Democratic
Elected Treasurer
TBD

Incumbent city treasurer Melissa Conyears-Ervin is running for re-election.

=== Candidates ===
- Melissa Conyears-Ervin, incumbent city clerk
- Bruce Leon, Chicago 50th Ward committeeperson, candidate for the Chicago Board of Education in 2024 and 2026, and candidate for Illinois's 9th congressional district in 2026

=== Results ===
2027 Chicago City Treasurer election
Candidate	Votes	%
Melissa Conyears-Ervin (incumbent)		
Bruce Leon		
Total votes		

== City Council ==
All 50 seats in the City Council are up for election.

== Police District Councils ==
Elections will be held for 22 police district councils, one for each of the city's police districts.
