= 2019 Chicago elections =

- February 26 and April 2, 2019
- Turnout: 35.45% ▼5.65 pp (first round); 33.08% ▼2.37 pp (second round)

The 2019 Chicago elections took place in two rounds on February 26, 2019, and April 2, 2019. Elections were held for Mayor of Chicago, City Clerk of Chicago, City Treasurer of Chicago, and all 50 members of the Chicago City Council. The candidates who won in these elections were inaugurated on May 20, 2019. Four ballot referendums were also voted on in certain precincts. The elections were administered by the Chicago Board of Elections.

== Mayor ==
2019 Chicago mayoral election
- February 26 and April 2, 2019
- Turnout: 35.20% (first round); 32.89% (second round)
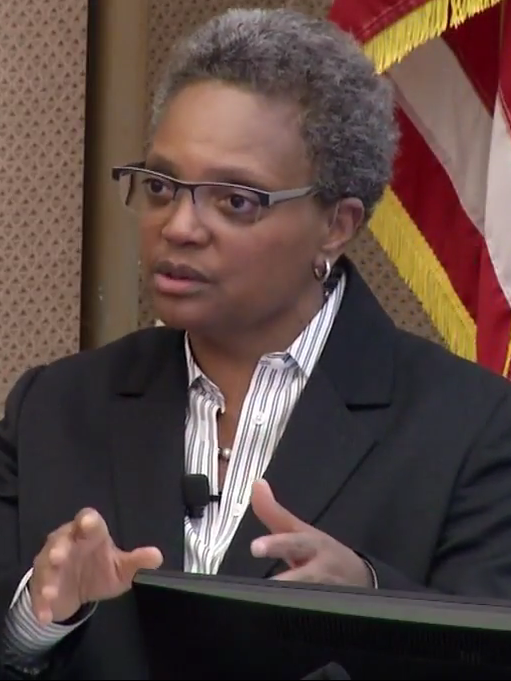

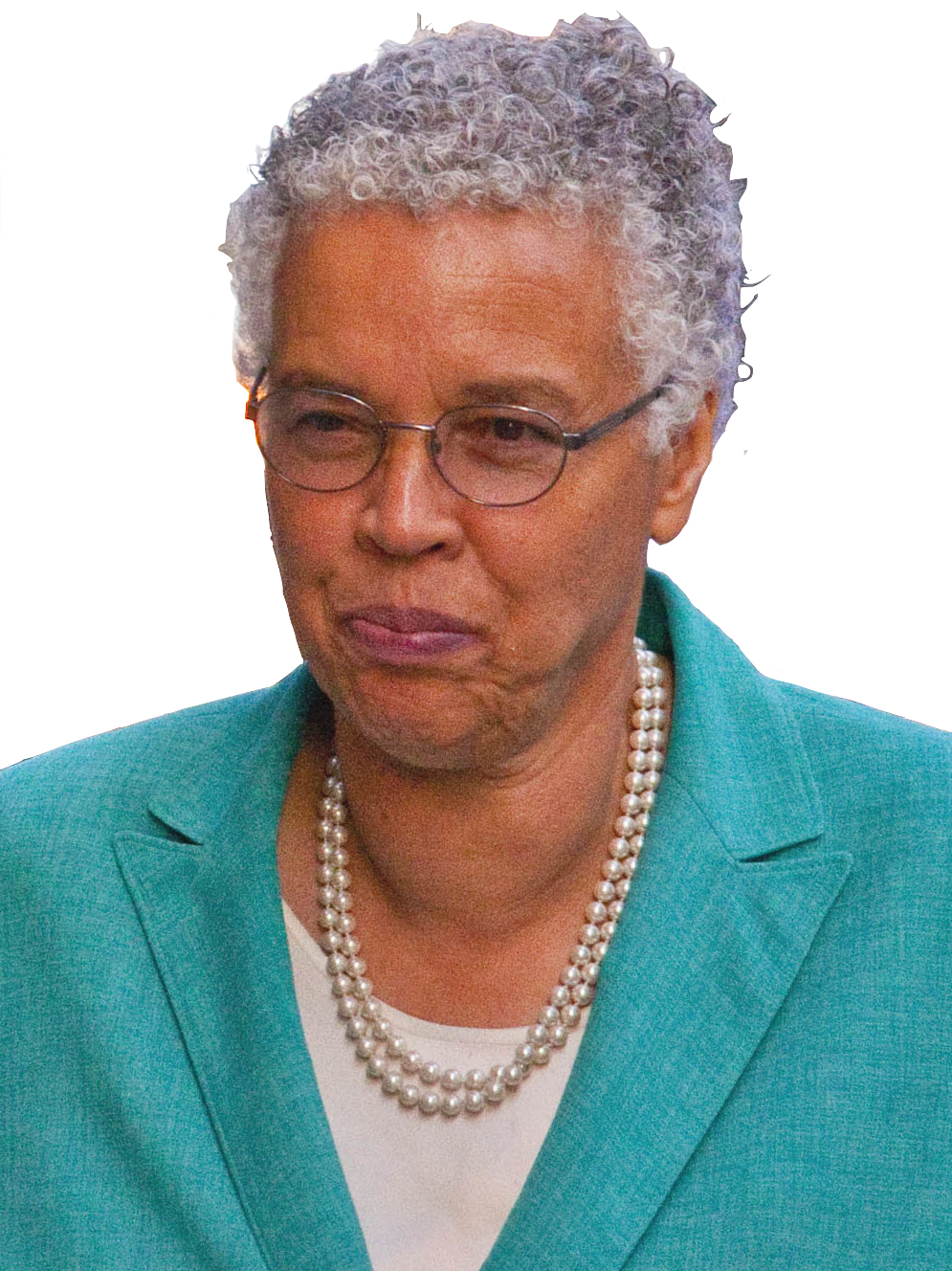

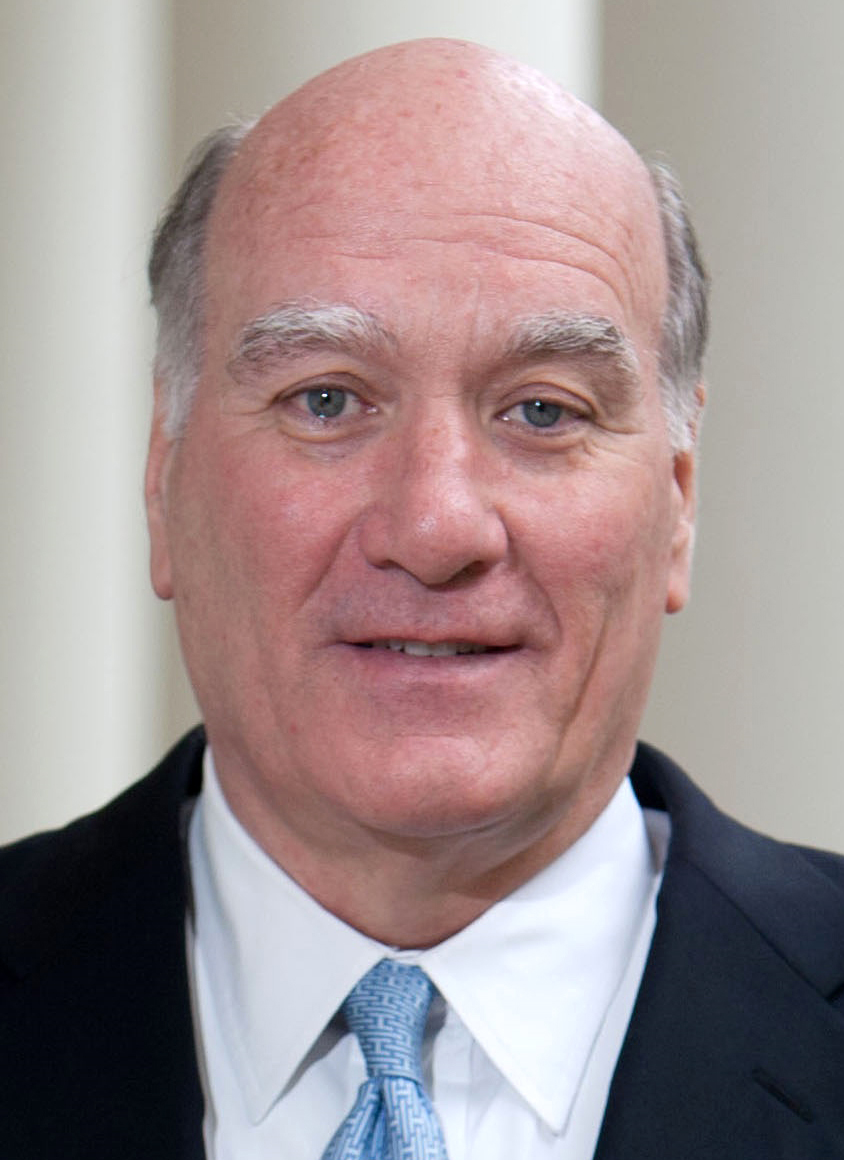

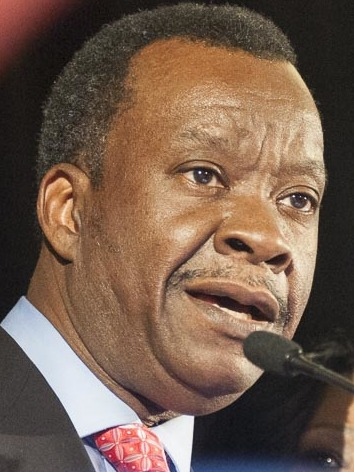

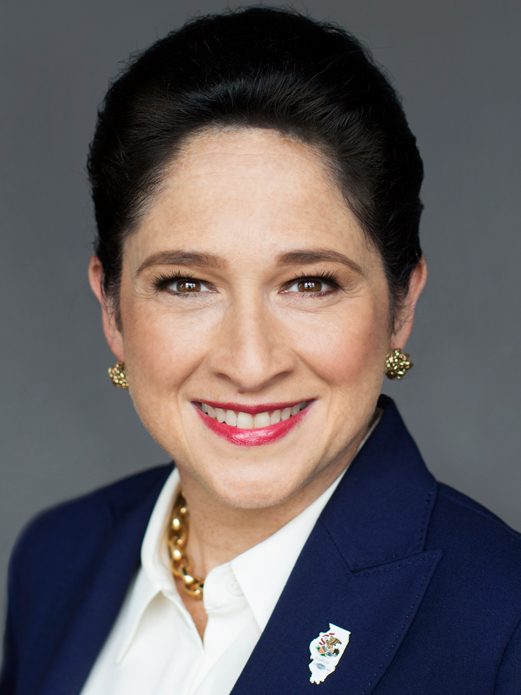

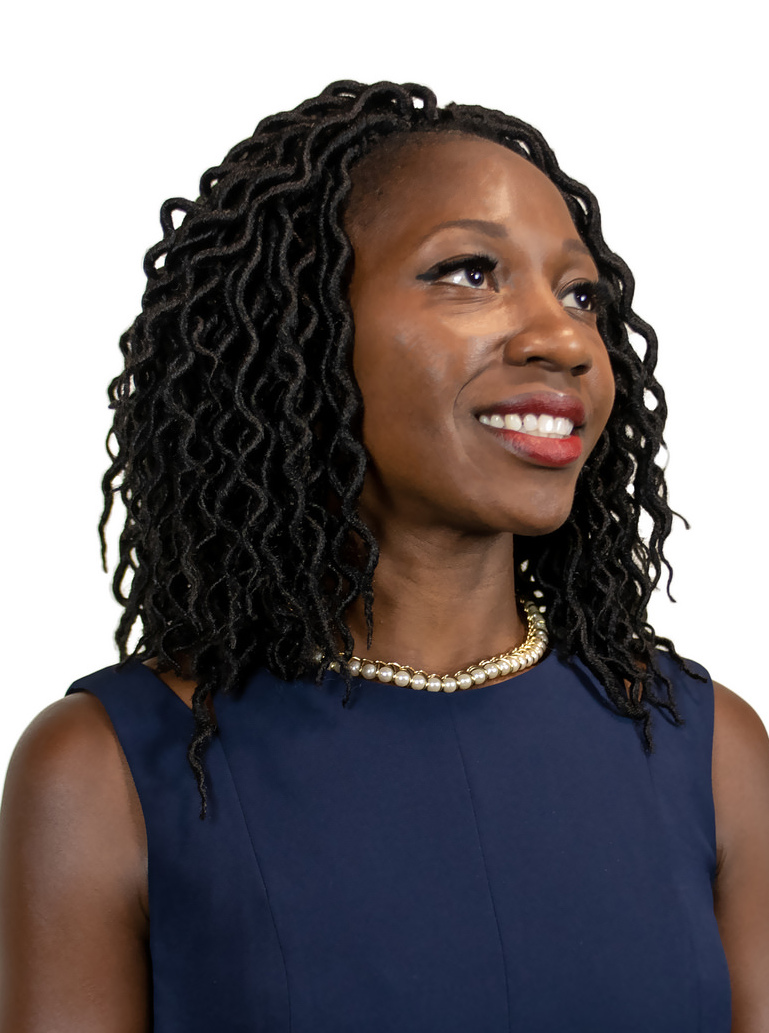

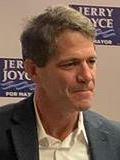

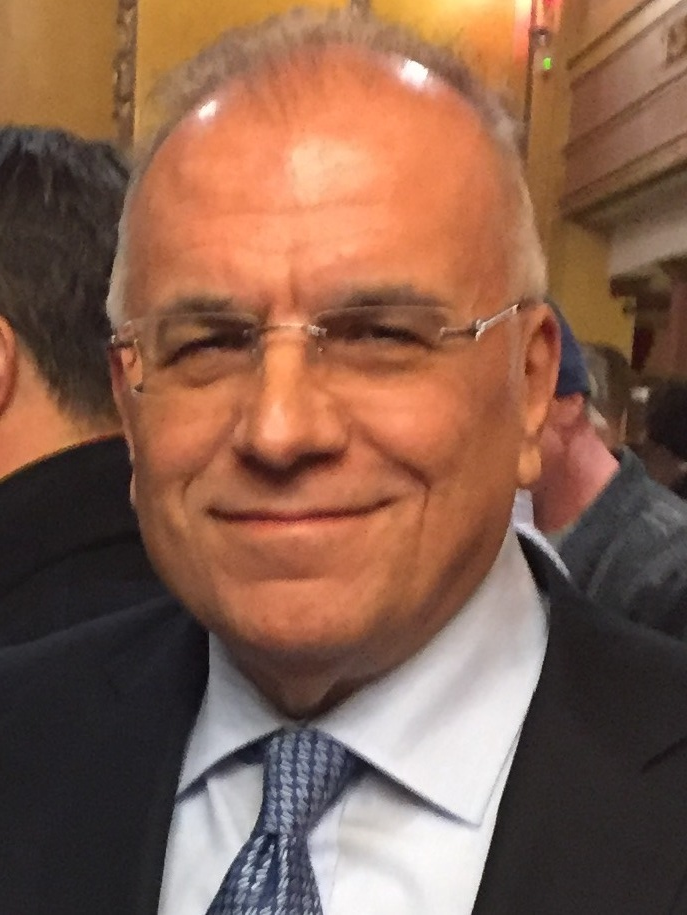

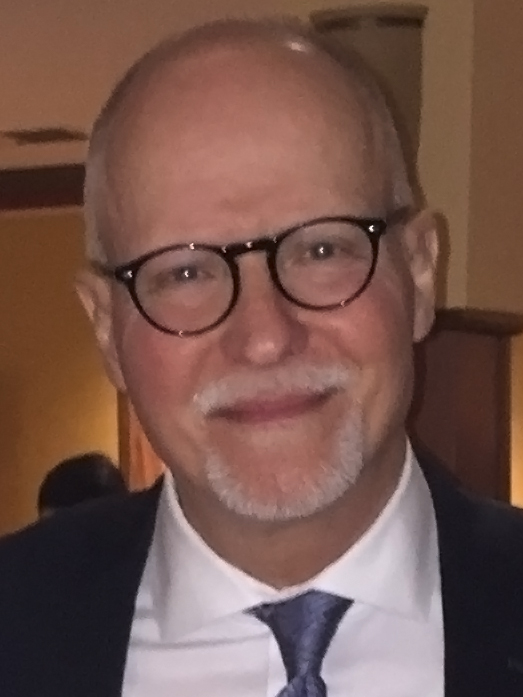
Candidate	Lori Lightfoot	Toni Preckwinkle	Bill Daley
First-round vote	97,667	89,343	82,294
First-round percentage	17.54%	16.04%	14.78%
Second-round vote	386,039	137,765
Second-round percentage	73.70%	26.30%
Candidate	Willie Wilson	Susana Mendoza	Amara Enyia
First-round vote	59,072	50,373	44,589
First-round percentage	10.61%	9.05%	8.00%
Candidate	Jerry Joyce	Gery Chico	Paul Vallas
First-round vote	40,099	34,521	30,236
First-round percentage	7.20%	6.20%	5.43%
- Lightfoot won all 50 wards in the runoff. 84–88% 79–84% 74–79% 69–74% 64–69% 59–64% 54-59%
Mayor before election
Rahm Emanuel
Elected mayor
Lori Lightfoot

Incumbent mayor Rahm Emanuel announced on September 4, 2018, that he would not run for re-election, reversing his previous announcement that he would run. Fourteen candidates appeared on the ballot in the first round election on February 26, 2019. Since no candidates won 50% of the vote, the top two vote-getters advanced to a run-off election. These candidates were former President of the Chicago Police Board Lori Lightfoot and Cook County Board President Toni Preckwinkle. In the general election on April 2, 2019, Lightfoot defeated Preckwinkle, winning with 73.7% of the vote.

=== Candidates ===
==== Candidates who advanced to runoff ====
The following candidates advanced to the runoff election on April 2:

- Lori Lightfoot, former President of the Chicago Police Board (2015–2018), Chair of the Chicago Police Accountability Task Force
- Toni Preckwinkle, President of the Cook County Board of Commissioners since 2010, former Alderman from the 4th Ward (1991–2010)

==== Candidates eliminated in the first round ====
The following candidates were eliminated in the first round and did not advance to the runoff election:

- Gery Chico, Chair of the Illinois State Board of Education (2011–2015), President of the Chicago Park District Board of Commissioners (2007–2010)
- Bill Daley, White House Chief of Staff (2011–2012), United States Secretary of Commerce (1997–2000)
- Amara Enyia, Director of the Austin Chamber of Commerce
- Bob Fioretti, former Alderman from the 2nd Ward (2007–2015)
- La Shawn Ford, Member of the Illinois House of Representatives since 2007
- John Kozlar, candidate for Alderman from the 11th Ward in 2011 and 2015
- Garry McCarthy, former Superintendent of the Chicago Police Department (2011–2015)
- Susana Mendoza, Illinois Comptroller since 2016, City Clerk of Chicago (2011–2016), Member of the Illinois House of Representatives (2001–2011)
- Neal Sáles-Griffin, CEO of CodeNow
- Paul Vallas, former chief executive officer of Chicago Public Schools (1995–2001)
- Willie Wilson, businessman, owner of Omar Medical Supplies

===== Write-in candidates =====
A full list of eligible write-ins was made available to precincts on election day.

- Rebecca Ayers
- Catherine Brown D’Tycoon, activist
- Daniel Fein
- Ryan Friedman
- Ja’Mal Green, executive director of the Majostee Allstars Community Center and Black Lives Matter activist
- Stephen Hodge
- John P. Loftus
- Richard Benedict Mayers, perennial candidate and alleged white supremacist, write-in candidate for Chicago City Clerk, Treasurer, and alderman in 2019; congressional candidate in 2000, 2002, 2008, 2016, and 2018; 1998 State House candidate; 1993 Berwyn city clerk and city treasurer candidate
- Tamara McCullough, a.k.a. Tamar Manasseh
- Robert A. Palmer
- Ziff A. Sistiunk
- Eric "Kubi" James Stewart
- Romaine Ware
- Roger L. Washington, police officer, educator at Malcolm X College, pastor, candidate for alderman in Chicago's 24th ward in 2015
- Gregory Young

==== Petitions rejected ====
The following candidates had been denied inclusion on the ballot following successful challenges to their petitions:

- Conrien Hykes Clark, octogenarian elementary school volunteer
- Dorothy A. Brown Cook, Clerk of the Circuit Court of Cook County since 2000
- Catherine Brown D'Tycoon, activist (subsequently ran as write-in)
- Sandra L. Mallory, former local school council president, former Chicago Public Schools security officer, candidate for alderman in Chicago's 15th ward in 2003 and 2015
- Richard Mayers, perennial candidate and alleged white supremacist, congressional candidate in 2000, 2002, 2008, 2016, and 2018; 1998 State House candidate; 1993 Berwyn city clerk and city treasurer candidate (subsequently ran as write-in)
- Roger L. Washington, police officer, educator at Malcolm X College, pastor, candidate for alderman in Chicago's 24th ward in 2015 (subsequently ran as write-in)

==== Withdrew ====
The following individuals are previously declared candidates who terminated their candidacies. Unless otherwise indicated, these individuals did not submit petitions:

- Rahm Emanuel, incumbent Mayor of Chicago
- Ja'Mal Green (had submitted petition), executive director of the Majostee Allstars Community Center and Black Lives Matter activist (subsequently ran as write-in)
- William J. Kelly, radio host and perennial candidate, candidate for mayor in 2015, gubernatorial candidate in 2018, candidate for state comptroller in 2010, congressional candidate in 1994
- Troy LaRaviere, president of the Chicago Principals and Administrators Association
- Matthew Rooney
- William "Dock" Walls, perennial candidate, candidate for mayor in 2007, 2011, 2015

==== Declined ====
The following are prospective and speculative candidates who declined to run:

- Anthony Beale, alderman from the 9th ward
- Richard Boykin, former member of the Cook County Board of Commissioners
- Walter Burnett Jr., alderman from the 27th ward
- Chance the Rapper, rapper, singer-songwriter, record producer
- Tom Dart, Cook County Sheriff
- Arne Duncan, former U.S. Secretary of Education and former CEO of Chicago Public Schools
- Bridget Gainer, member of the Cook County Board of Commissioners
- Chuy García, Congressman from Illinois's 4th congressional district, former member of the Cook County Board of Commissioners and candidate for mayor in 2015
- Luis Gutierrez, former Congressman from Illinois's 4th congressional district
- Valerie Jarrett, former director of the White House Office of Public Engagement and Intergovernmental Affairs
- Ra Joy, executive director of CHANGE Illinois and candidate for lieutenant governor in 2018;
- Raymond Lopez, alderman of the 15th Ward
- Lisa Madigan, former Attorney General of Illinois
- Proco Joe Moreno, member of the Chicago City Council from the 1st ward
- Ricardo Muñoz, member of the Chicago City Council from the 22nd ward
- David Orr, former Cook County Clerk, former mayor of Chicago 1987–1987;
- Maria Pappas, Cook County Treasurer
- Ameya Pawar, member of the Chicago City Council, and candidate for governor in 2018
- Mike Quigley, Congressman from Illinois's 5th congressional district
- Pat Quinn, candidate for Illinois Attorney General in 2018, former Governor of Illinois, former Lieutenant Governor of Illinois and former Treasurer of Illinois
- Carlos Ramirez-Rosa, alderman for the 35th Ward (running for reelection)
- Kwame Raoul, Attorney General of Illinois, former member of the Illinois Senate
- Larry Rogers Jr., commissioner of the Cook County Board of Review
- Michael Sacks, chief executive officer of GCM Grosvenor
- Roderick Sawyer, member of the Chicago City Council and chair of the Chicago City Council Black Caucus
- Kurt Summers, City Treasurer of Chicago
- Pat Tomasulo, sportscaster, comedian
- Tom Tunney, member of the Chicago City Council from the 44th ward
- Anna M. Valencia, Chicago City Clerk
- Scott Waguespack, member of the Chicago City Council and chairman of the council's Progressive Reform Caucus
- Jesse White, Secretary of State of Illinois and former state representative

=== Results ===
2019 Chicago mayoral election results (first round) Nonpartisan election
Candidate	Votes	%
Lori Lightfoot	97,667	17.54
Toni Preckwinkle	89,343	16.04
William M. Daley	82,294	14.78
Willie L. Wilson	59,072	10.61
Susana A. Mendoza	50,373	9.05
Amara Enyia	44,589	8.01
Jerry Joyce	40,099	7.20
Gery Chico	34,521	6.20
Paul Vallas	30,236	5.43
Garry McCarthy	14,784	2.65
La Shawn K. Ford	5,606	1.01
Robert "Bob" Fioretti	4,302	0.77
John Kenneth Kozlar	2,349	0.42
Neal Sales-Griffin	1,523	0.27
Write-in	86	0.02
Total votes	556,844	

2019 Chicago mayoral election results (runoff)
Candidate	Votes	%
Lori Lightfoot	386,039	73.70
Toni Preckwinkle	137,765	26.30
Total votes	523,804	

== City Clerk ==
Chicago City Clerk election, 2019
- February 26, 2019
- Turnout: 16.74%
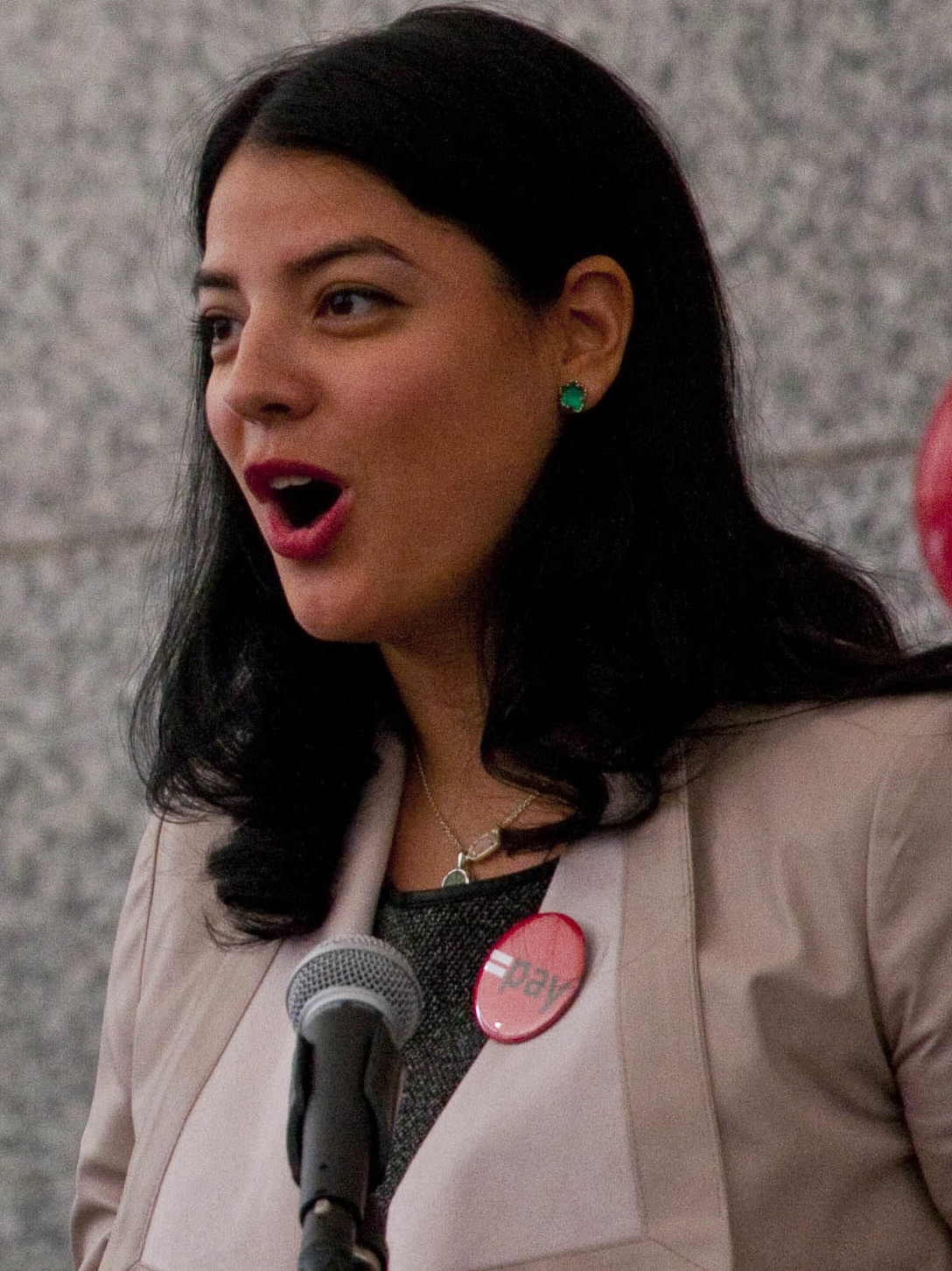
Candidate	Anna M. Valencia
Vote	264,319
Percentage	99.85%
Clerk before election
Anna M. Valencia
Democratic
Elected Clerk
Anna M. Valencia
Democratic

Incumbent City Clerk Anna M. Valencia ran unopposed on the ballot after two potential challengers were removed for the ballot due to a lack of sufficient nominating petition signatures. Valencia thus won in the first round election on February 26, 2019.

Valencia had been first appointed in 2017 following the resignation of Susana Mendoza (who had resigned in order to assume the office of Illinois Comptroller).

=== Candidates ===
==== On ballot ====
- Anna M. Valencia, incumbent City Clerk

==== Write-in ====
- Richard Benedict Mayers, perennial candidate and alleged white supremacist, write-in candidate for Chicago mayor, Treasurer, and alderman in 2019, congressional candidate in 2000, 2002, 2008, 2016, and 2018; 1998 State House candidate; 1993 Berwyn city clerk and city treasurer candidate
- William "Dock" Walls, perennial candidate, candidate for mayor in 2007, 2011, 2015, 2019

==== Petitions rejected ====
The following candidates had been denied inclusion on the ballot following successful challenges to their petitions:

- Elizabeth Arias-Ibarra
- Patricia Horton, former Metropolitan Water Reclamation District of Greater Chicago Commissioner, candidate for 3rd Ward Chicago alderman in 2015, candidate for 3rd district Cook County Commissioner in 2018

=== Endorsements ===
Anna M. Valencia

Organizations

- Chicago Federation of Labor
- Chicago Firefighters Local 2
- EMILY's List
- Latino Leadership Council

Newspapers

- Chicago Sun-Times

=== Results ===
2019 Chicago City Clerk general election Nonpartisan election
Candidate	Votes	%
Anna M. Valencia	264,319	99.85
William "Dock" Walls, III (write-in)	386	0.15
Richard Benedict Mayers (write-in)	1	0.00
Total votes	264,319	100

== City Treasurer ==
Chicago City Treasurer election, 2019
- February 26 and April 2, 2019
- Turnout: 32.19% (first round); 31.33% (second round)
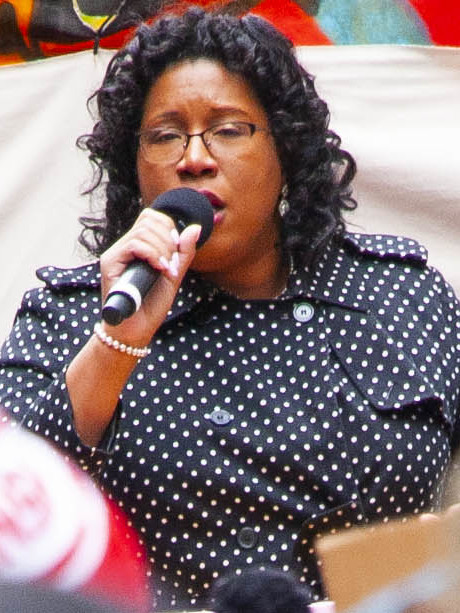

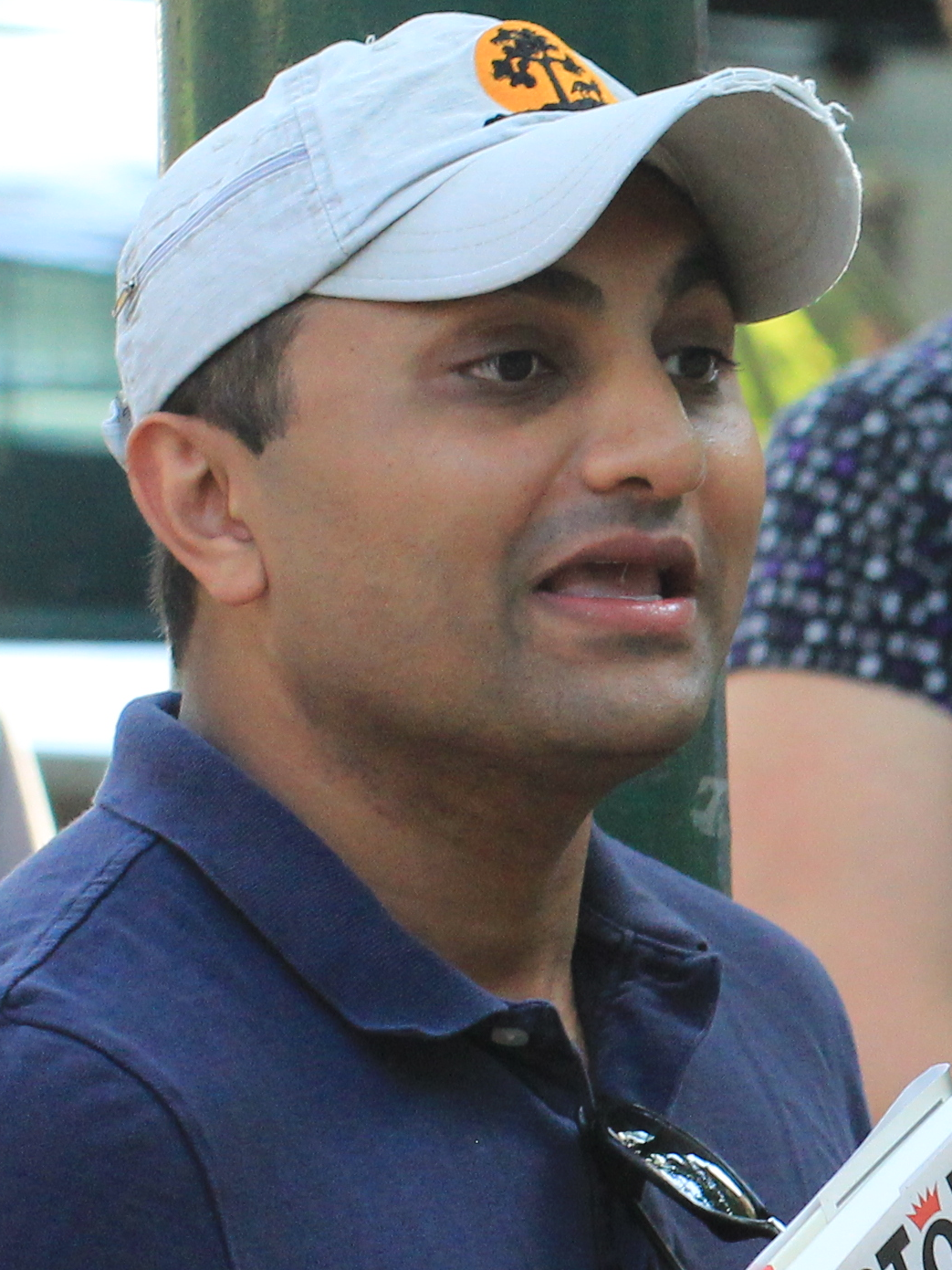

Candidate	Melissa Conyears-Ervin	Ameya Pawar	Peter Gariepy
First round vote	225,385	211,759	72,068
First round percentage	44.26%	41.59%	14.15%
Runoff vote	296,293	202,714
Runoff percentage	59.38%	40.62%
- Conyears-Ervin—80–90% Conyears-Ervin—70–80% Conyears-Ervin—60–70% Conyears-Ervin—50–60% Pawar—50–60% Pawar—60–70% Pawar—70–80%
Treasurer before election
Kurt Summers
Democratic
Elected Treasurer
Melissa Conyears-Ervin
Democratic

Incumbent City Treasurer Kurt Summers announced that he would not run for re-election on October 16, 2018. Three candidates appeared on the first round ballot on February 26, 2019: Illinois state representative Melissa Conyears-Ervin, Chicago alderman Ameya Pawar, and accountant Peter Gariepy. Conyears-Ervin and Pawar advanced to the run-off election on April 2, where Conyears-Ervin won with 59.4% of the vote.

=== Candidates ===
==== On ballot ====
- Melissa Conyears-Ervin, member of the Illinois House of Representatives from the 10th district since 2017
- Peter Gariepy, candidate for Cook County Treasurer in 2018
- Ameya Pawar, 47th ward Chicago alderman

==== Write-in ====
- Richard Benedict Mayers, perennial candidate and alleged white supremacist, write-in candidate for Chicago mayor, City Clerk, and alderman in 2019, congressional candidate in 2000, 2002, 2008, 2016, and 2018; 1998 State House candidate; 1993 Berwyn city clerk and city treasurer candidate

=== Endorsements ===
==== First round ====
Melissa Conyears-Ervin

Officeholders

- Dorothy A. Brown, Clerk of the Circuit Court of Cook County
- Danny K. Davis congressman from Illinois's 7th congressional district
- Jesse White, Illinois Secretary of State

Individuals

- Sam Toia, CEO of the Illinois Restaurant Association

Organizations

- Chicago Federation of Labor
- Chicago Teachers Union
- EMILY's List
- Fraternal Order of Police Chicago Lodge #7
- Service Employees International Union Local 73
Peter Gariepy

Officeholders

- Proco Joe Moreno, alderman from Chicago's 1st Ward
- Scott Waguespack, alderman from Chicago's 32nd Ward

Organizations

- Independent Voters of Illinois Independent Precinct Organization
- Northside Democracy for America
Ameya Pawar

Officeholders

- Jesús "Chuy" García, congressman from Illinois's 4th congressional district
- Mike Quigley, United States congressman from Illinois's 5th congressional district
- Jan Schakowsky, United States congressman from Illinois's 9th congressional district

Individuals

- Michael Pfleger, religious leader

Organizations

- Service Employees International Union Local 1
- Sierra Club Illinois

Newspapers

- Chicago Sun-Times
- Chicago Tribune

==== Runoff ====
Melissa Conyears-Ervin

Officeholders

- Dorothy A. Brown, Clerk of the Circuit Court of Cook County
- Danny K. Davis, congressman from Illinois's 7th congressional district
- Pat Quinn, former Governor of Illinois
- Jesse White, Illinois Secretary of State

Individuals

- Peter Gariepy, candidate for Treasurer in first round
- Christopher G. Kennedy, candidate for Governor of Illinois in 2018
- Sam Toia, CEO of the Illinois Restaurant Association

Organizations

- Chicago Federation of Labor
- Chicago Teachers Union
- EMILY's List
- Fraternal Order of Police Chicago Lodge #7
- Service Employees International Union Local 73

Newspapers

- The Chicago Crusader
Ameya Pawar

Officeholders

- Jesús "Chuy" García, congressman from Illinois's 4th congressional district
- Mike Quigley, United States congressman from Illinois's 5th congressional district
- Jan Schakowsky, United States congressman from Illinois's 9th congressional district

Individuals

- Michael Pfleger, religious leader

Organizations

- Service Employees International Union Local 1
- Sierra Club Illinois

Newspapers

- Chicago Sun-Times
- Chicago Tribune

=== Polls ===
==== Runoff ====
Poll source	Date(s) administered	Sample size	Margin of error	Melissa Conyears-Ervin	Ameya Pawar	Undecided
Anzalone Liszt Grove	March 4–7	502	±4.4%	34%	34%	
GBA Strategies	March 2–4	600	±4.0%	46%	36%	

==== First round ====
Poll source	Date(s) administered	Sample size	Margin of error	Melissa Conyears-Ervin	Peter Gariepy	Ameya Pawar	Undecided
Anzalone Liszt Grove	December 13–17, 2018		±4.4%	16%	6%	23%	55%

=== Results ===
2019 Chicago City Treasurer election results (first round) Nonpartisan election
Candidate	Votes	%
Melissa Conyears-Ervin	225,385	44.26
Ameya Pawar	211,759	41.59
Peter Gariepy	72,068	14.15
Richard Benedict Mayers (write-in)	4	0.00
Total votes	509,216	

2019 Chicago City Treasurer election results (runoff)
Candidate	Votes	%
Melissa Conyears-Ervin	296,293	59.38
Ameya Pawar	202,714	40.62
Total votes	499,007	

== City Council ==
Of the 50 wards represented in Chicago City Council, 45 incumbent aldermen ran for re-election, of whom 38 were re-elected. In the first round election on February 26, 2019, four new aldermen were elected, including three who defeated incumbents. Elections in fourteen wards advanced to run-off elections on April 2, when eight new aldermen were elected. A total of 12 new aldermen were elected.

== Ballot measures ==
Four referendums appeared on the ballot in certain precincts on February 26, 2019:

- Rent Control Referendum
- Obama Center Referendum
- Marijuana Tax Revenue Allocation Referendum
- El Paseo Trail Referendum

== Turnout ==
=== General election ===
560,701 ballots were cast by voters in the city's primary elections, a turnout of 35.45% of registered voters.

The ballots included:

- 365,867 ballots cast in-person cast at precinct polling places on election day
- 61,748 domestic mail absentee ballots
- 195 military/oversee absentee votes
- 125,618 early votes
- 12,040 "grace period" votes by late-registering voters
- 3,798 ballots cast at nursing homes
- 657 ballots cast by pre-trail detainees

=== Runoff elections ===
526,886 ballots were cast by voters in the city's runoff elections, a turnout of 33.08% of registered voters.

The ballots included:

- 339,578 ballots cast in-person cast at precinct polling places on election day
- 58,455 domestic mail absentee ballots
- 233 military/oversee absentee votes
- 122,827 early votes
- 1,518 "grace period" votes by late-registering voters
- 3,623 ballots cast at nursing homes
- 662 ballots cast by pre-trail detainees

== See also ==
- 2019 United States elections
