= Judith Rice =

American politician and judge (born 1957)

Judge of the 7th Subcircuit of the Circuit Court of Cook County
- Incumbent
- Assumed office December 1, 2014
- Preceded by: Freddrenna Lyle

Chicago City Treasurer
- In office November 15, 2000 – December 1, 2006
- Preceded by: Miriam Santos
- Succeeded by: Stephanie Neely

Personal details
- Born: July 30, 1957 (age 69) Chicago, Illinois, U.S.
- Party: Democratic
- Parents: Fred Rice Jr. (father); Thelma Rice (mother)
- Education: Loyola University (B.A); John Marshall Law School (J.D.)

Judith C. Rice (born July 30, 1957) is an American politician who served as Chicago City Treasurer from 2000 to 2006 and has served as a judge on the Circuit Court of Cook County 7th sub-circuit since 2014.

== Early life ==
Rice was born July 30, 1957, in Chicago, Illinois, to Fred Rice Jr. and Thelma Rice. She is the granddaughter of sharecroppers. Rice's father was a Chicago police officer, and would, in 1983, become Chicago's first black head of police.

Rice attended Avalon Park Elementary School and Mercy High School. In high school, she was a drama club member, and was the lead in her high school production of Hello, Dolly! Rice graduated high school in 1975, and attended Northern Illinois University from 1975 to 1976, transferring in 1977 to Loyola University Chicago, where she graduated cum laude with a Bachelor of Arts in communications in 1981.

In 1984, Rice began attending Chicago's John Marshall Law School, earning her juris doctor in 1988 and being admitted to Illinois State Bar Association.

== Early career ==
In 1982 Rice was hired for a job in the Cook County State's Attorney office, first working as a victim/witness assistant. She worked her way up to being hired to be an assistant to the Illinois Attorney General's office. She held that job from 1988 through 1989.

From 1989 through 1990, Rice served as Assistant Corporation Counsel of Chicago. From 1990 through 1992, she served as the city's Director of Administrative Adjunction. From 1992 through 1993, she served as deputy director of the city's Department of Revenue. From 1993 through 1995, she served as the city's Director of the Department of Revenue of Chicago. From 1995 through 1996, she worked as a member of mayor Richard M. Daley's staff as his executive assistant.

From 1996 through 1999, Rice served as Commissioner of the Chicago Department of Water, the first female commissioner in the department's history. From December 1999 through 2000, she served as head of the Chicago Department of Transportation, also being that department's first female head.

== Chicago City Treasurer ==
In November 2000, mayor Richard M. Daley appointed Rice to serve as Chicago City Treasurer, after Miriam Santos was forced to resign after pleading guilty to mail fraud. Rice was confirmed in a unanimous vote by the Chicago City Council and sworn into office on November 15, 2000.

Rice won reelection to the office in 2003, running unopposed. Rice co-chaired the Champions program of the 2006 Gay Games. On October 26, 2006, Rice announced her resignation as City Treasurer. Daley appointed Stephanie Neely as her successor. Rice then joined Daley's administration as a Deputy Mayor. She left that position the following year.

== Private sector career ==
Rice served as Senior Vice President, director of government relations, head of community affairs and head of economic development for BMO Harris Bank. She began her tenure at BMO Harris in 2007.

== Judge of the Circuit Court of Cook County ==
In 2014, Rice was elected to a vacant seat on the 7th subcircuit of the Circuit Court of Cook County. She defeated Marianne Jackson and Owens J. Shelby in the Democratic primary. The runner-up, Jackson, was ultimately appointed to another seat on the 7th subcircuit on October 22, 2014, to which she would reelected in 2016, and serve on until retiring in 2018. The election was to the seat vacated by William H. Taylor II upon his 2012 appointment to the Illinois Appellate Court. That seat had been filled, in the interim period before a newly-elected occupant could be sworn in on December 1, 2014, by Freddrenna Lyle, who on September 10, 2012, had been appointed by the Illinois Supreme Court to the serve seat effective November 16, 2012. Instead of seeking reelection to the seat in 2014, Lyle instead ran unsuccessfully for an Illinois Appellate Court seat in 2014.

On the court, Rice has been assigned to the Domestic Relations Division. In 2020, Rice was successful in winning her retention election.

In 2026, Rice ran unopposed for the Democratic nomination to a 10-year term on the Illinois Appellate Court. She is expected to be unopposed in the general election. She expected to become the first openly-lesbian appellate court justice in the state of Illinois.

== Nonprofit work ==
Rice has served on the advisory board of the Chicago Children's Advocacy Center.

== Personal life ==
In 2013, Rice publicly came out as a lesbian. She revealed that, by the time, she had been in a relationship with her partner Barb Heller for ten years. In January 2013, Rice signed an open letter encouraging Illinois to legalize same-sex marriage.

== Awards and recognition ==
In 2019, the Cook County State's Attorney office named Rice one of the recipients of its Pride Recognition Awards, which recognized "outstanding LGBT community group and leaders, attorneys, and judges" from Cook County.

== Electoral history ==
2003 Chicago City Treasurer election
Candidate	Votes	%
Judith C. Rice (incumbent)	400,678	100
Total votes	400,678	100

2014 Circuit Court of Cook County 7th Subcircuit (vacancy of Taylor) Democratic primary
Party	Candidate	Votes	%
Democratic	Judy Rice	8,111	45.77
Democratic	Marianne Jackson	6,605	37.27
Democratic	Owens J. Shelby	3,004	16.95
Total votes		17,720	100

2014 Circuit Court of Cook County 7th Subcircuit (vacancy of Taylor) election
Party	Candidate	Votes	%
Democratic	Judy Rice	51,764	100
Total votes		51,764	100

2020 Judith Rice Circuit Court of Cook County 7th Subcircuit Judith Rice retention election
Option	Votes	%
Yes (retain)	1,285,368	78.32
No (remove)	355,910	21.68
Total votes	1,641,278	100

== See also ==
- List of LGBT jurists in the United States
