= 2014 Illinois judicial elections =

- November 4, 2014

The 2014 Illinois judicial elections consisted of both partisan and retention elections, including those one seat of the Supreme Court of Illinois for ten seats in the Illinois Appellate Court. Primary elections were held on March 18, 2014, and general elections were held on November 4, 2014. These elections were part of the 2014 Illinois elections.

== Supreme Court of Illinois ==
Justices of the Supreme Court of Illinois are elected by district. One seat held a retention election.

The court has seven seats total separated into five districts. The first district, representing Cook County, contains three seats, making it a multi-member district, while other four districts are single-member districts. Justices hold ten year terms.

=== Retention elections ===
To be retained, judges were required to have 60% of their vote be "yes".

District	Incumbent				Vote		Cite
District	Party	Name	In office since	Previous years elected/retained	Yes (Retain)	No (Remove)	Cite
5th	Republican	Lloyd A. Karmeier	December 6, 2000	2004 (elected)	230,122 (60.8%)	148,546 (39.2%)	

== Illinois Appellate Court ==
Illinois Appellate Court justices hold ten-year terms.

=== 1st district (Gordon vacancy) ===
A vacancy was created by the retirement of Joseph Gordon. Shelly A. Harris was elected to fill it. This was a special election as Gordon's term would have ended in 2014.

==== Democratic primary ====
Illinois Appellate Court 1st district (Gordon vacancy) Democratic primary
Party	Candidate	Votes	%
Democratic	Shelly A. Harris	91,556	37.44
Democratic	Fredrenna M. Lyle	86,607	35.41
Democratic	Susan Kennedy Sullivan	66,389	27.15
Total votes		244,552	100

==== Republican primary ====
The Republican primary was cancelled, as no candidates filed to run.

==== General election ====
Illinois Appellate Court 1st district (Gordon vacancy) election
Party	Candidate	Votes	%
Democratic	Shelly A. Harris	925,590	100
Total votes		925,590	100

=== 1st district (Murphy vacancy) ===
A vacancy was created by the death of Michael J. Murphy. Democrat John B. Simon was elected to fill the vacancy. This was a regular election, as Murphy's term would have ended in 2014.

==== Democratic primary ====
Illinois Appellate Court 1st district (Murphy vacancy) Democratic primary
Party	Candidate	Votes	%
Democratic	David Ellis	210,866	100
Total votes		210,866	100

==== Republican primary ====
The Republican primary was cancelled, as no candidates filed to run.

==== General election ====
Illinois Appellate Court 1st district (Murphy vacancy) election
Party	Candidate	Votes	%
Democratic	David Ellis	904,949	100
Total votes		904,949	100

=== 1st district (Steele vacancy) ===
After the retirement of John O. Steele in January 2013, Shelly A. Harris as appointed to fill the vacancy. However, Harris did not seek reelection in 2014, instead running for the seat left vacant by the retirement of Joseph Gordon. Democrat John B. Simon was elected to fill the seat. This was a special election, as Steele's term ended in 2018.

==== Democratic primary ====
Illinois Appellate Court 1st district (Steele vacancy) Democratic primary
Party	Candidate	Votes	%
Democratic	John B. Simon	126,796	54.15
Democratic	Sharon Oden Johnson	107,360	45.85
Total votes		234,156	100

==== Republican primary ====
The Republican primary was cancelled, as no candidates filed to run.

==== General election ====
Illinois Appellate Court 1st district (Steele vacancy) election
Party	Candidate	Votes	%
Democratic	John B. Simon	900,379	100
Total votes		900,379	100

=== 2nd district (Bowman vacancy) ===
A vacancy was created by the 2012 death of John J. Bowman. Michael J. Burke was elected to fill the vacancy, running unopposed in both the Republican primary and general election. This was a special election, as Bowman's term ended in 2020.

==== Democratic primary ====
Illinois Appellate Court 2nd district (Bowman vacancy) Republican primary
Party	Candidate	Votes	%
Republican	Michael J. Burke	213,613	100
Total votes		213,613	100

==== Republican primary ====
The Republican primary was cancelled, as no candidates filed to run.

==== General election ====
Illinois Appellate Court 2nd district (Bowman vacancy) election
Party	Candidate	Votes	%
Republican	Michael J. Burke	713,483	100
Total votes		713,483	100

=== 4th district (McCullough vacancy) ===
Incumbent Republican was appointed December 19, 2012 to fill the vacancy left by the death of John T. McCullough. She was reelected, running unopposed in both the Republican primary and general election. This was a regular election, as McCullough's term ended in 2014.

==== Democratic primary ====
The Democratic primary was cancelled, as no candidates filed to run.

==== Republican primary ====
Illinois Appellate Court 4th district (McCullough vacancy) Republican primary
Party	Candidate	Votes	%
Republican	Lisa Holder White	115,841	100
Total votes		115,841	100

==== General election ====
Illinois Appellate Court 4th district (McCullough vacancy) election
Party	Candidate	Votes	%
Republican	Lisa Holder White	335,693	100
Total votes		335,693	100

=== Retention elections ===
To be retained, judges were required to have 60% of their vote be "yes".

District	Incumbent				Vote		Cite
District	Party	Name	In office since	Previous years elected/retained	Yes (Retain)	No (Remove)	Cite
1st	Democratic	Joy Cunningham	1993	1994 (elected) 2004 (retained)	729,137 (78.3%)	202,531 (21.7%)	
2nd	Republican	Susan Fayette Hutchinson	December 5, 1994	1994 (elected), 2004 (retained)	616,660 (80.5%)	149,486 (19.5%)	
3rd	Republican	William E. Holdridge	December 5, 1994	1994 (elected), 2004 (retained)	378,330 (78.9%)	101,216 (21.1%)	
3rd	Democratic	Mary K. O'Brien	December 26, 2003	2004 (elected)	380,700 (79.3%)	99,635 (20.7%)	
4th	Republican	Robert J. Steigmann	July 1989	1994 (elected), 2004 (retained)	288,136 (79.9%)	72,441 (20.1%)	

== Lower courts ==
Lower courts also saw judicial elections.
