= Ameya Pawar =

American politician

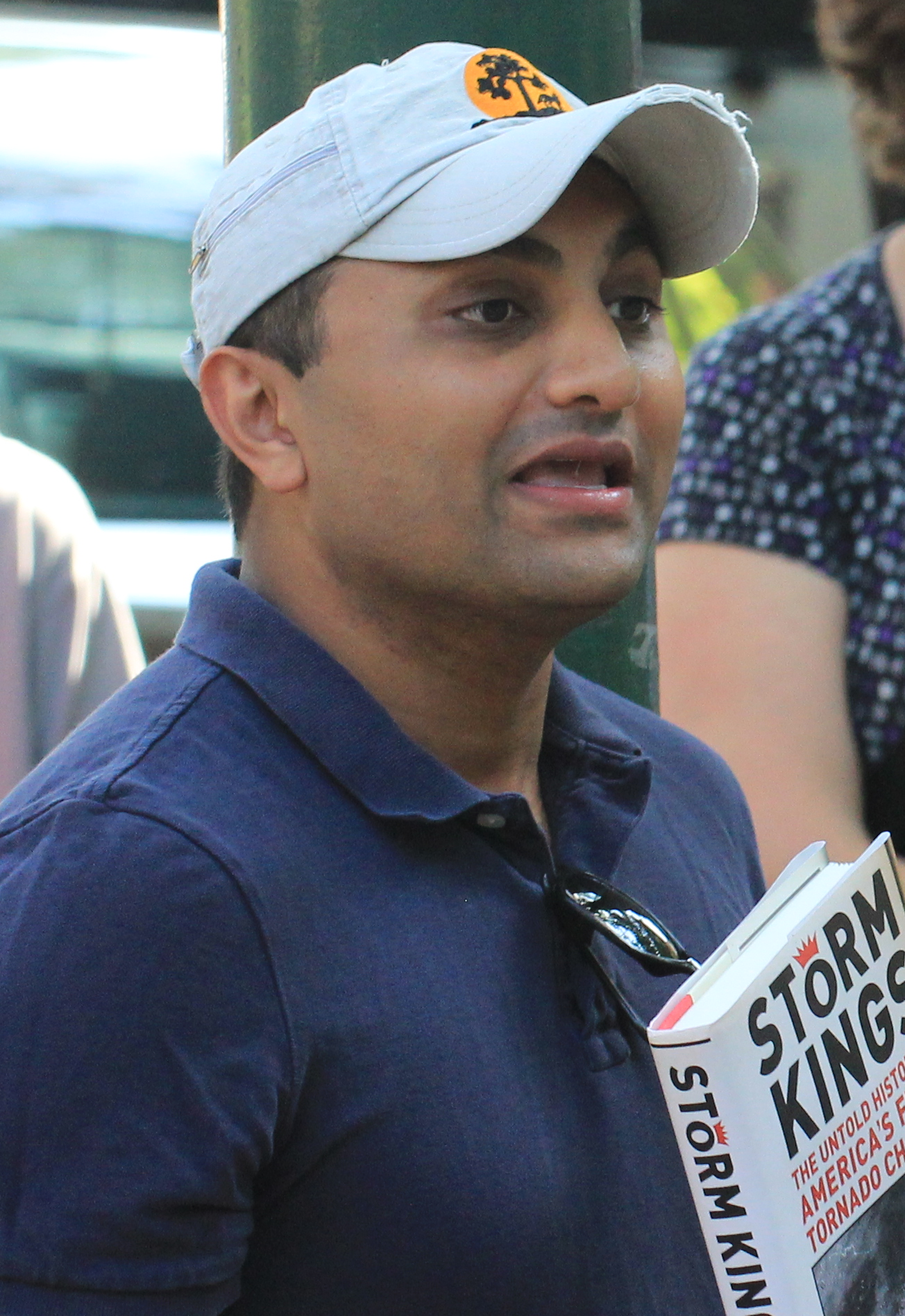

Member of the Chicago City Council from the 47th ward
- In office May 16, 2011 – May 20, 2019
- Preceded by: Eugene Schulter
- Succeeded by: Matt Martin

Personal details
- Born: April 22, 1980 (age 46) Chicago, Illinois, U.S.
- Party: Democratic
- Education: Missouri Valley College (BA); Illinois Institute of Technology (MPA); University of Chicago (MS, MA)

Ameya Pawar (born April 22, 1980) is an American politician who previously served on the Chicago City Council as the alderman for the 47th ward of the City of Chicago. He was first elected in the 2011 municipal elections, and was elected to a second term on February 24, 2015. Pawar's 2015 re-election was secured with over 82% of the vote, the largest margin in the election cycle. Pawar is the first Indian American and Asian American in Chicago City Council history.

He was a candidate for the Democratic primary for Governor of Illinois for the 2018 election, but dropped out on October 12, 2017, citing a prohibitive lack of campaign funds. He did not run for re-election to City Council in 2019, and instead was a candidate for City Treasurer of Chicago. He advanced to the run-off in that election, but lost to Melissa Conyears-Ervin.

== Early life and career ==
Ameya Pawar is the former alderman of Chicago's 47th Ward and the first Asian and Indian American elected to the Chicago City Council. After leaving office, Ameya joined the Economic Security Project as a senior fellow and is working on narrative change efforts around guaranteed income and public options, including public banks. In 2020, Ameya was named a Leadership in Government Fellow with the Open Society Foundations (OSF). His OSF work will focus on public banking and public options with leading figures and organizations across the country and world. In addition, Ameya is a senior adviser to The Academy Group, a Chicago-based social enterprise working to break the racial wealth gap, and is a lecturer at the University of Chicago's School of Social Service Administration.He is also a special adviser to the University of Chicago's Poverty Lab.

While in office, Ameya focused legislative efforts around social justice, worker rights, and economic justice. To this end, Ameya led most all labor policy and worker rights legislation passed in Chicago over the last eight years, including raising the minimum wage to $13/hr., guaranteeing paid sick leave, combating wage theft, and preserving housing for Chicago's most vulnerable.

Ameya is a US State Department Critical Language Program alum, a 2012 University of Illinois Edgar Fellow, and was named to Crain's Chicago 40 under 40 in 2011. Most recently, he was named a 2018 McCormick Foundation Executive Fellow.

Prior to leaving office, Ameya chaired the Chicago Resilient Families Task Force. The task force made recommendations on a city-run guaranteed income pilot.

Ameya is an expert on the connections between disaster planning and response and poverty. In 2014, Ameya co-wrote the textbook, “Emergency Management and Social Intelligence: A Comprehensive All-Hazards Approach.” The book was published by Taylor & Francis.

== Chicago City Council ==
The 47th Ward encompassed the residence of then-mayor Rahm Emanuel, making the mayor a constituent represented by Pawar.

=== Legislation ===
In 2018, Pawar introduced legislation to pilot Universal Basic Income in the City of Chicago. Pawar was named chair of Mayor Emanuel's Resilient Families Task Force which will explore a universal basic income pilot, modernization of the earned income tax credit, and other policies. The task force is supported by the Economic Security Project.

== 2019 City Treasurer campaign ==
On October 29, 2018, Pawar announced his intention to run for Chicago treasurer. Before deciding to run for treasurer, he had considered running in the coinciding mayoral election. Pawar won 41.59 percent of the vote in the February 26, 2019 general election, forcing a runoff with Melissa Conyears-Ervin, a member of the Illinois House of Representatives, who won 44.26 percent of the vote, but had less than a majority of the vote, which led to an April 2 runoff. Pawar lost again to Conyears-Ervin in the runoff, receiving 40.62 percent of the vote.

A key stance that Pawar took in his campaign was advocacy for the creation of a municipal public bank.

== Other activities ==
In 2011, Governor Pat Quinn appointed Pawar to the Illinois Innovation Council. Pawar is the only elected official on this statewide council. In 2013, Quinn appointed Pawar to the Asian American Employment Plan Council.

Pawar was listed as a surrogate for President Barack Obama's 2012 campaign.

While running for office, he created an iPhone application named Chicago Works. This app enabled Chicago residents to make service requests from their iPhone.

As of 2023, Pawar is a senior advisor to the Economic Security Project, a nonprofit.

== Electoral history ==
2011 Chicago 47th Ward aldermanic general election
Party	Candidate	Votes	%
Nonpartisan	Ameya Pawar	8,572	50.79
Nonpartisan	Tom O'Donnell	7,347	43.53
Nonpartisan	Micael Reichel	605	3.58
Nonpartisan	Tom Jacks	353	2.09
Total votes		16,877	100

2015 Chicago 47th Ward aldermanic general election
Party	Candidate	Votes	%
Nonpartisan	Ameya Pawar (incumbent)	9,974	82.78
Nonpartisan	Rory A. Fiedler	2,075	17.22
Total votes		12,049	100

2019 Chicago Treasurer election
Candidate	First round		Runoff	
Candidate	Vote	%	Vote	%
Melissa Conyears-Ervin	225,385	44.26%	296,293	59.38%
Ameya Pawar	211,759	41.59%	202,714	40.62%
Peter Gariepy	72,068	14.15%	—N/a	—N/a
Write-in	4	0.00%	—N/a	—N/a
