= C. Herman Plautz =

American politician

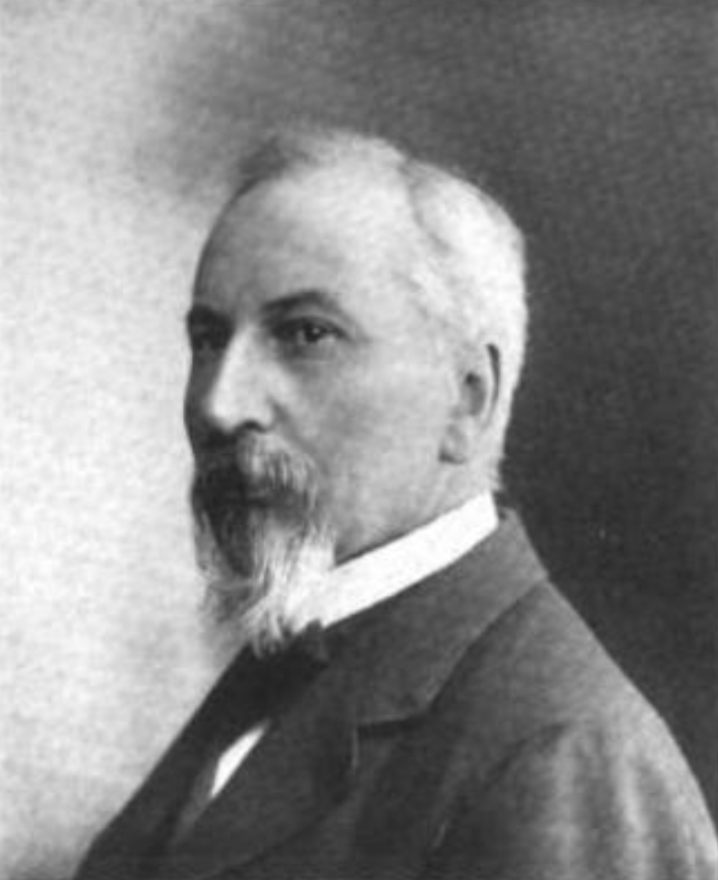

City Treasurer of Chicago
- In office 1887–1889
- Preceded by: William M. Devine
- Succeeded by: Bernard Roesing

City Clerk of Chicago
- In office 1885–1887
- Preceded by: John G. Neumeister
- Succeeded by: D.W. Nickerson

Personal details
- Born: October 20, 1844 Klein Sabow, Kingdom of Prussia
- Died: 1901 (aged 56–57) Chicago, Illinois, U.S.
- Party: Republican

C. Herman Plautz (October 20, 1844 – 1901) was a German American drug and chemical manufacturer and politician, born in Klein Sabow, Prussia, who served as a member of the City Clerk from 1885 to 1887 and as City Treasurer of Chicago from 1887 to 1889. Prior to entering politics, Plautz was responsible for the foundation of the Chicago Drug and Chemical Company. Plautz died in 1901.
