= Freddrenna Lyle =

American judge

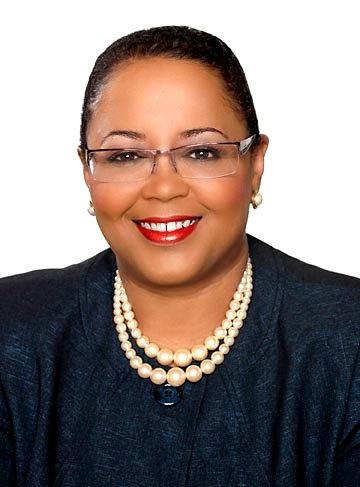
- Lyle in 2011

Judge of the Circuit Court of Cook County
- Incumbent
- Assumed office December 16, 2011
- Preceded by: Michael Stuttley

Member of the Chicago City Council from the 6th ward
- In office February 8, 1998 – May 15, 2011
- Preceded by: John O. Steele
- Succeeded by: Roderick Sawyer

Personal details
- Born: Chicago, Illinois
- Education: University of Illinois (B.A.); John Marshall Law School (J.D.)
- Profession: Lawyer

Freddrenna Margaret Lyle (born June 1, 1951) is an American jurist and former Chicago alderman who serves as a justice of the Illinois Appellate Court, First District, appointed on December 2, 2022, by the Illinois Supreme Court. Lyle previously served as a judge of the Circuit Court of Cook County since 2011, and earlier served for thirteen years as alderman of the 6th Ward in the Chicago City Council, becoming the first woman elected to represent the ward. She currently serves as chair of the Judicial Council of the National Bar Association.

== Early life ==
Freddrenna Margaret Lyle has lived in Chicago's Park Manor neighborhood for more than 60 years. She attended Park Manor Elementary School and South Shore High School. She built a career that spans municipal finance law, legislative service in the Chicago City Council, and the Illinois judiciary. Over several decades, Lyle has been active in bar associations, civic organizations, and judicial education initiatives while also serving in numerous leadership roles within national legal organizations.

She earned her undergraduate degree from the University of Illinois at Chicago and her Juris Doctor degree from John Marshall Law School. She began her legal career in Chicago, where she developed expertise in public finance law and municipal bond transactions. Early in her career, she became involved in professional bar associations and civic advocacy efforts connected to Chicago politics and community institutions.

== Legal career and public service ==
Lyle began her professional career in private legal practice, including work in municipal finance. In 1991, she served as bond counsel financing for the Harold Washington Library Center while with Smith & Lyfe, a project that helped fund the construction of the Chicago Public Library's main downtown branch. During her work in municipal finance, she became the first African American woman listed in the municipal bond buyers' directory (“The Red Book”), a professional directory widely used within the municipal bond industry.

Her involvement in the legal profession and civic advocacy expanded through bar association work and leadership roles. Through these roles, Lyle became recognized within the Illinois legal community for her work in bar leadership, professional governance, and legal reform initiatives. Her early service included the following.

Year	Organizations	Positions
1982	Cook County Bar Association	Member; Election Committee; Young Lawyers Section, 1986; President, 1990
1983	Lawyers Committee for the Election of Harold Washington	Co-chair
1984	Coalition to Save South Shore Country Club	Secretary/general counsel
1985	National Bar Association	Member; Former Region VII director; Women Lawyers Division; Board of directors
1984	Coalition to Save South Shore Country Club	Secretary/Ggneral counsel
1991–1998	Supreme Court of Illinois Committee on Character and Fitness	Member
1992	Governor James R. Thompson’s Task Force on Election Reforms	Member
1995–1996	Chief Judge Comerford's Committee on Electronic Dissemination of Court Records	Member

== Public service ==
Lyle was president of the Cook County Bar Association, board member of the National Bar Association, member of the Supreme Court Committee on Character and Fitness, and co-chair of the Lawyer’s Committee for Harold Washington. She also served on Governor Blagojevich’s transition team. She is currently a member of Park Manor Neighbors, Chatham Avalon Park Community Council, NAACP, and Rainbow/PUSH. She is currently the vice chair of the Cook County Democratic Party and chairman of the Black Elected Officials of Illinois.

== Aldermanic career ==
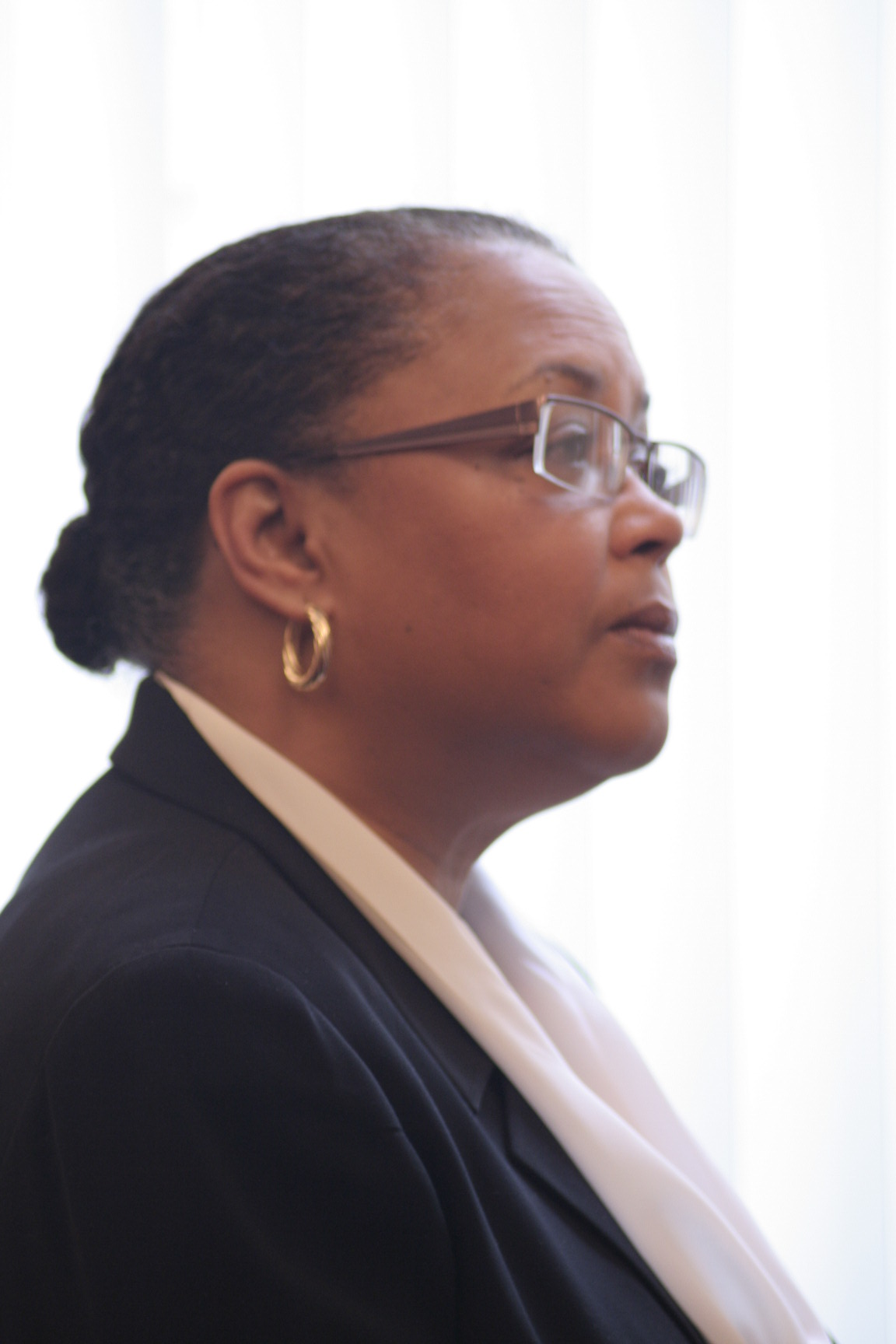
Lyle attending a City Council meeting on January 13, 2011

Lyle was appointed alderman by Chicago Mayor Richard M. Daley on February 8, 1998 to fill the unexpired term of John O. Steele. She was reelected for a full term in 1999, 2003, and 2007. She was also elected as the ward's Democratic committeeman in 2006. As an alderman, Lyle served on five committees: Budget; Finance; Parks and Recreation; License and Consumer Protection; Traffic and Public Safety; and Rules and Ethics.

In 2011, Lyle lost re-election to the city council, bring narrowly defeated Roderick Sawyer in a runoff.

== Judgeship ==
After her defeat, she served as a legal advisor to the Council's Black Caucus regarding the redistricting process for Chicago's 50 wards. Later that year, the Illinois Supreme Court appointed Lyle to a vacancy on the Circuit Court of Cook County created by retirement of Judge Michael Stuttley.

In 2014, Lyle unsuccessfully ran for a state appellate court judgeship. She lost the Democratic primary election.

== Personal life ==
Lyle continues to reside in Park Manor.
