= David L. Hartigan =

American politician

David Hartigan

Member of the Chicago City Council from the 49th ward
- In office April 20, 1955 – April 28, 1959
- Preceded by: Brian J. Ducey
- Succeeded by: Paul T. Wigoda

City Treasurer of Chicago
- In office December 6, 1954 – April 20, 1955
- Preceded by: William G. Milota
- Succeeded by: Morris B. Sachs

Personal details
- Born: David L. Hartigan; 1906 Chicago, Illinois, U.S.
- Died: April 28, 1959 (aged 52–53) Chicago, Illinois, U.S.
- Party: Democratic
- Spouse: Coletta Hogan
- Children: 5, including Neil
- Education: Northwestern University (JD)
- Occupation: Attorney

David L. Hartigan (1906–1959) was an American politician and attorney who was the alderman for Chicago's 49th Ward from 1955 to 1959. He previously served as the City Treasurer of Chicago from 1954 until 1955. He was a member of the Democratic Party.

== Early life and education ==
The youngest of 14 children, Hartigan was born into an Irish Catholic family on Chicago's South Side. His father, an immigrant from Ireland, was disabled in an industrial accident when Hartigan was young. As a result, Hartigan worked multiple jobs to support his parents and siblings. He went on to graduate from St. Ignatius College Prep and Northwestern University Law School.

== Career ==
In the 1930s, Hartigan worked for the Cook County Board of Tax Appeals. Afterwards, he joined the office of the Chicago City Treasurer in 1943, where he worked as an attorney and the deputy treasurer. During World War II, he temporarily served as the de facto city treasurer. He was officially appointed treasurer in 1954 by Mayor Martin H. Kennelly, an office which had become vacant after its previous occupant, William Milota, was elected as bailiff of the Municipal Court.

Instead of seeking a full term as city treasurer, Hartigan successfully ran for the Chicago City Council in 1955. He represented the 49th ward, which covered Rogers Park on the city's far north side. During his tenure, Hartigan sat on the Committee on Forestry and Recreation, becoming an advocate for the creation of additional park space in the city. He was reelected in 1959, but died from diabetes only shortly after being sworn in for this second term.

== Personal life ==
Hartigan was married to Coletta Hogan and had five children. One of his daughters, Eileen, died when she was eleven in an accidental drowning. He was the patriarch of a prominent Chicago political family: his son Neil had a multi-decade political career, serving as Lieutenant Governor of Illinois and, later, as Attorney General of Illinois. His granddaughter, Laura, worked as the chief fundraiser for Bill Clinton and the Democratic Party during the 1990s, serving as National Finance Director of Clinton's 1996 reelection campaign.

Hartigan's brother, Matthew, also served in elected office as a longtime Municipal Court judge, notably presiding over the Ruth Ann Steinhagen trial and unsuccessfully running against a Chicago Outfit aligned opponent in the hotly contested 1932 Cook County State's Attorney Democratic primary.

== Legacy ==
Hartigan (David) Beach in Roger's Park is named in honor of David Hartigan. The park was officially renamed in 1965 by the Chicago Park District, following a request of the city council in 1960.

Additionally, the David L. Hartigan Law Scholarship Fund at Loyola University Chicago was established in his honor by his son Neil. The scholarship supports law students who are "in their final year of study and demonstrate high academic achievement and an interest in public service law".

== Electoral history ==
1955 Chicago 49th Ward aldermanic election
Candidate	General election		Runoff election	
Candidate	Votes	%	Votes	%
David L. Hartigan	8,880	43.90	13,123	58.70
George A. Lane	4,314	21.30	9,242	41.30
Esther Saperstein	3,053	15.10		
J. LeRoy Mandable	2,776	13.70		
Sheldon L. Glieberman	1,208	6.00		
Total	20,231	100	22,365	100

1959 Chicago 49th Ward aldermanic election
Candidate	Votes	%
David L. Hartigan	8,533	69.60
Albert A. Brown	1,480	12.00
Irving Birnbaum	717	5.80
Edward L. Halpern	678	5.50
Jack Saks	567	4.60
Charles Veil	295	2.40
Others	10	0.00
Total	12,280	99.90%
