= Kurt Summers =

Kurt Summers Jr.
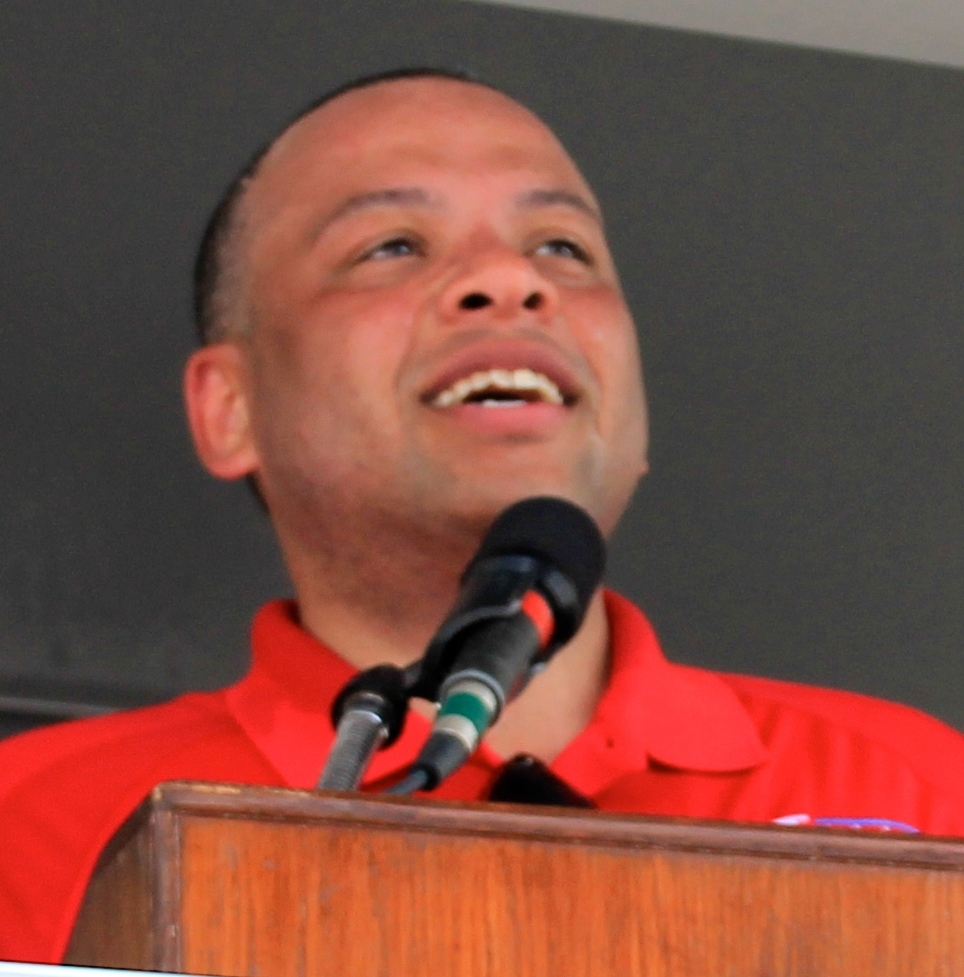
- Summers in 2015

City Treasurer of Chicago
- In office December 1, 2014 – May 20, 2019
- Preceded by: Stephanie Neely
- Succeeded by: Melissa Conyears-Ervin

Personal details
- Party: Democratic
- Education: Washington University in St. Louis; Harvard University

Kurt Summers Jr. is the former treasurer of the City of Chicago, Illinois. Summers was appointed by Mayor Rahm Emanuel on October 22, 2014, and took the oath of office on December 1, 2014. Summers was elected to his first full-term in office during Chicago's citywide election on February 24, 2015. He was preceded in office by Stephanie Neely.

== Early life and education ==
Summers graduated from Whitney Young Magnet High School in Chicago. He received a Bachelor of Science in Business Administration with Management Distinction High Honors in Finance and International Business, with a minor in East Asian Studies, from Washington University in St. Louis. He also holds a Master of Business Administration from Harvard Business School.

== Career ==
Summers began his career at the consulting firm McKinsey & Company. He was later appointed chief of staff to Cook County board president Toni Preckwinkle and as the appointed trustee for the county's $9 billion pension fund. In that capacity, Summers led changes to provide performance management in every department, which Preckwinkle claimed in 2014 had saved the city $400 million annually. In his role as chief of staff for President Preckwinkle, Summers also steered the closure of a $487 million budget deficit while keeping the administration's promise to roll back the county sales tax, saving taxpayers more than $400 million a year. Additionally, Summers aided in reforming the county's procurement rules and helped pave the way for a more sustainable health and hospital system.

In 2008, Summers was appointed as chief of staff for "Chicago 2016", the city's bid for the 2016 Summer Olympics.

He was a senior vice president at Grosvenor Capital Management, and a member of the Office of the chairman. In that role, he led the Emerging and Diverse Manager business, which invested over $2 billion with minority- and women-owned firms.

When he was City Treasurer, Summers managed the city's $7 billion dollar investment portfolio and is responsible for maintaining records and accounts of the city's finances while ensuring transparency and accountability for all transactions. Summers sat on five local pension boards with nearly $25 billion under management.

Summers's first act in office was the proposal of a 90-day-plan called "Invest in Our Chicago", which aimed to increase investment in the city. Summers also launched a listening tour, visiting Chicago's 77 communities in 77 days.

== Personal life ==
Summers currently resides in Hyde Park.
