= Anna M. Valencia =

City Clerk of Chicago

Anna Valencia
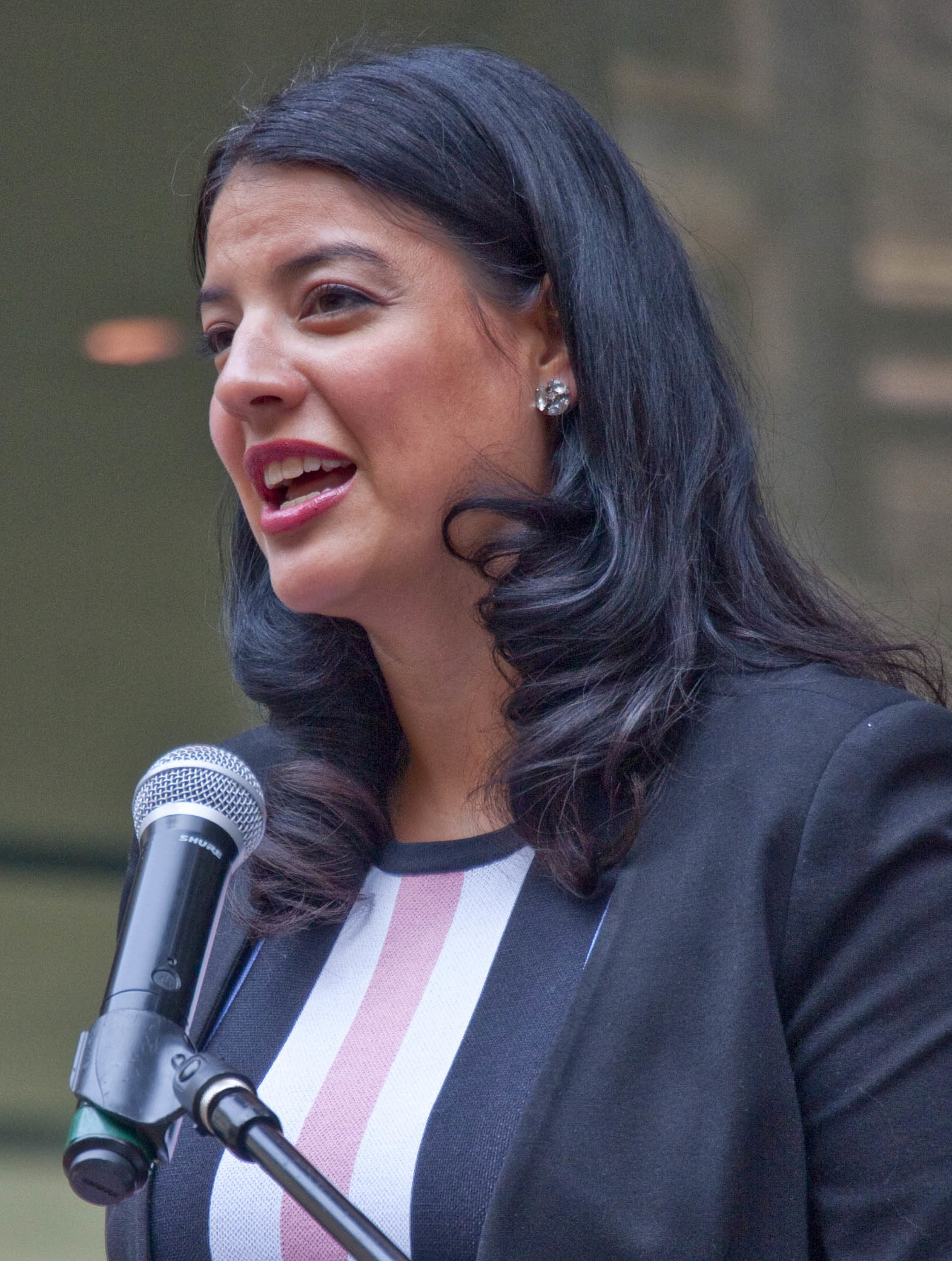
- Valencia in 2019

City Clerk of Chicago
- Incumbent
- Assumed office January 25, 2017
- Preceded by: Susana Mendoza

Personal details
- Born: January 16, 1985 (age 41) Granite City, Illinois, U.S.
- Party: Democratic
- Spouse: Reyahd Kazmi (m. 2013)
- Children: 1
- Education: University of Illinois Urbana-Champaign (BA)

Andrea Marie Valencia (born January 16, 1985) is an American politician who has been serving as the City Clerk of Chicago since January 2017. She was elected to a full term as City Clerk in 2019 and re-elected in 2023. She ran in the Democratic primary for Illinois Secretary of State in 2022, but placed second with 35% of the vote.

== Early life and education ==
Andrea Marie Valencia was raised in Granite City, Illinois, the daughter of Joe and Debbie Valencia. She is of Mexican descent.

Valencia received a Bachelor of Arts degree with a major in international studies from the University of Illinois Urbana-Champaign in 2007.

== Career ==
=== Early political career ===
Valencia was a staff member for Mike Quigley's congressional election campaign in 2009 and for Michigan Representative Gary Peters's congressional election campaign in 2010. Valencia was a member of a Legislative Counsel and Government Affairs team for Chicago Mayor Rahm Emanuel in 2011 and later served as its director from April 2016 until January 2017. She was the campaign manager for Senator Dick Durbin in 2014. In 2015, she was a Senior Advisor for Chicago Mayor Rahm Emanuel’s re-election campaign.

=== Chicago city clerk ===
She was appointed as City Clerk of the City of Chicago in December 2016, and was sworn into office on January 25, 2017.

She ran to continue her tenure as City Clerk in the 2019 election. After two challengers were removed from the ballot due to insufficient nominating petition signatures, she was unopposed and won election to a full term.

In the fall of 2016, $1 million was set aside in the City Clerk's budget for Chicago's Municipal ID program which will allow all residents the ability to apply for a government-issued ID. Since taking office, Valencia has announced that the Municipal ID card will be a three-in-one card so that it can also be used as transit and library cards. In December 2017, Clerk Valencia announced the pilot program and that the card would be called the "CityKey" with the first 100,000 IDs being free.

In September 2024, Valencia signed an open letter opposing Chicago mayor Brandon Johnson's efforts to oust Public Schools CEO Pedro Martinez and calling for Martinez to be retained as schools CEO.

=== 2022 Secretary of State campaign ===
In June 2021, Valencia announced her candidacy for Illinois Secretary of State in the 2022 election to succeed longtime, outgoing incumbent Jesse White. Valencia was endorsed by White, Governor JB Pritzker, and U.S. Senators Dick Durbin and Tammy Duckworth. On June 28, 2022, Valencia lost the Democratic primary to former state Treasurer Alexi Giannoulias.

== Personal life ==
Valencia is married and lives in Chicago. On April 15, 2020, she gave birth to a daughter, Reyana Joy Valencia Kazmi.
