= Stephanie Neely =

American politician

Chicago City Treasurer
- In office December 4, 2006 – December 1, 2014
- Preceded by: Judith Rice
- Succeeded by: Kurt Summers

Personal details
- Born: Chicago, Illinois
- Party: Democratic
- Education: Smith College (BA); University of Chicago (MBA)
- Profession: Investment manager

Stephanie D. Neely is an American finance professional and politician. She served as the City Treasurer of Chicago from December 2006 to December 2014. As of 2025, she is a member of the Illinois Sports Facilities Authority.

== Early life and career ==
Stephanie Neely is a native Chicagoan. Neely's father owned and operated a successful chain of gas stations located on the southside of Chicago. Neely attended Smith College and graduated with a bachelor's in economics in 1985. She later earned a M.B.A. from University of Chicago. Prior to serving as City Treasurer, Neely served as Vice President at Northern Trust Global Investments. Neely accumulated more than 20 years of private-sector financial experience before being appointed City Treasurer. In 2004, Mayor Daley chose Stephanie Neely to serve on the Illinois Sports Facilities Authority.

== Treasurer ==
On November 8, 2006, Mayor Richard M. Daley appointed Neely the Chicago City Treasurer to take office December 4, 2006. A week later, she was confirmed by the Chicago City Council on November 15, 2006. Neely succeeded Judith Rice, who stepped down from the position effective December 1, 2006, to rejoin Daley's administration as a deputy mayor. Pursuant to her role as City Treasurer, Neely maintained a $7 billion portfolio and tracked the balances on all City accounts. The City pension fund has posted double-digit returns on pension fund investments during Neely's tenure. In addition to her duties as Treasurer, Neely serves as trustee on the City's five public pension boards. Programs operated by the Treasurer's Office during Neely's tenure included Small Business Development Loans, Financial Literacy programs in Chicago Public Schools, and free seminars on using social media to build small business.

Neely was reelected to a second term in February 2011. In 2013, while Treasurer, Neely was considered a finalist to be Pat Quinn's running mate in the 2014 Illinois gubernatorial election after then-incumbent Lieutenant Governor Sheila Simon opted to run for Illinois Comptroller. Quinn ultimately chose Paul Vallas.

== Present career (2015-2025) ==
In 2015, she became vice president of treasury for Allstate Insurance Company, where she oversees corporate finance and commercial banking.
