= Roderick Sawyer =

American alderman (born 1963)

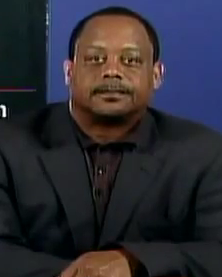
- Sawyer in 2014

Member of the Chicago City Council from the 6th ward
- In office May 16, 2011 – May 15, 2023
- Preceded by: Freddrenna Lyle
- Succeeded by: William Hall

Personal details
- Born: Roderick Terrance Sawyer; April 12, 1963 (age 63) Chicago, Illinois, U.S.
- Party: Democratic
- Spouse: Cheryll Aikens (m. 1993)
- Children: 2
- Relatives: Eugene Sawyer (father)
- Education: DePaul University (BS); Illinois Institute of Technology (JD)

Roderick Terrance Sawyer (born April 12, 1963) is an American politician and the former alderman of the 6th ward located in Chicago, Illinois, United States. During part of his tenure on the council, Sawyer was chairman of the Health and Human Relations Committee. Sawyer was a member of the Progressive Reform Caucus, and was the chairman of the African American Caucus.

Sawyer forwent reelection to the city council in 2023 to make an unsuccessful run for mayor of Chicago in the 2023 Chicago mayoral election, receiving 0.43% of the vote

== Background ==
Sawyer was born in Chicago in 1963, and is one of three children of Eugene and Eleanor Sawyer (née Taylor). He grew up in the 6th ward on the South Side of the city. His father served as mayor of Chicago, being appointed to the office after the sudden death of Harold Washington and serving from December 1987 until April 1989. His was the second African-American to hold the office (the first being Washington).

Sawyer attended high school at St. Ignatius College Prep, graduating in 1981. He went on to earn a Bachelor of Science in Finance from DePaul University, and a Juris Doctor from the Chicago Kent College of Law. Sawyer has worked as a lawyer, realtor, and stock broker. At one point, he was a member of a Local School Council.

== Aldermanic career ==
Sawyer was first elected in 2011 after narrowly defeating incumbent Freddrenna Lyle, and served three terms, being re-elected in 2015 and 2019. During part of his tenure on the council, Sawyer was chairman of the Health and Human Relations Committee. Sawyer was a member of the Progressive Reform Caucus, and was the chairman of the African American Caucus. While an alderman, he continued to work as a lawyer.

Sawyer's first ran for elective office was his campaign against city council incumbent Freddrenna Lyle in Chicago's aldermanic ward 6 in 2011. He unseated Lyle, who was one of four council incumbents unseated in the April 2011 runoff elections. Sawyer faced two opponents in his 2015 campaign for re-electio: Richard Wooten and Brian Garner. Wooten had been the third-place finisher of the 2011 race. Sawyer received 10,659 votes in the February 2015 general election. With 56.2% of the vote, he won the election outright without the need for a runoff. In 2019, Sawyer won re-election in a runoff. For the coinciding 2019 Chicago mayoral election, Sawyer endorsed Toni Preckwinkle, giving her his endorsement in the first round of the election.

In 2013, Sawyer and nine other council members founded the council's Progressive Reform Caucus. From 2015 through 2019, he was chair of the Aldermanic Black Caucus. While leader, Sawyer was a leading voice in demanding Police Superintendent Garry McCarthy's resignation following the release of footage of the murder of Laquan McDonald. Despite Sawyer having backed her election opponent Toni Preckwinkle, in 2019 newly-inaugurated mayor Lori Lightfoot appointed Sawyer to serve as the chair of the council's Committee on Health and Human Relations.

In 2020 (amid the George Floyd protests) Sawyer supported a proposed ordinance to establish a commission on giving reparations to black Chicago residents. In June 2020, Sawyer proposed an ordinance which would end the Chicago Public Schools' contract to station Chicago Police Department officers at schools. In 2022, he supported the proposed GoodKids MadCity’s Peacebook Ordinance to create an Office of Neighborhood Safety tasked with long-term solutions to combat gun violence. He also supported the creation of local police district councils.

Sawyer is a member of the Democratic Party, and previously served as the 6th ward's a Democratic committeeperson. He was elected to that position in March 2012, in his second candidacy for the position (having previously run unsuccessfully in 1996). He was re-elected to additional four-year stints in the position in 2016 and 2020.

== 2023 Chicago mayoral candidacy ==
In June 2022, Sawyer announced his candidacy for mayor in the 2023 election, challenging incumbent Mayor Lori Lightfoot. Before running, Sawyer had been critical of incumbent mayor Lori Lightfoot on several issues. These include her late September 2022 removal of a $42.7 million property tax increase that would have taken effect prior to the 2023 election. The tax increase would have gone through on an automatic escalator basis had Lightfoot not revoked it. Sawyer said, "If you thought it was responsible to have a modest tax increase, you should stand by that. And if you feel it's not, you should stand by that. If you're not gonna do that, you're just blowing with the wind." When he announced his run for mayor, Sawyer said that crime was the first issue on his mind, and that if elected, he would fire Chicago Police Supt. David Brown.

In the initial round of the election, Sawyer was defeated, placing last of nine candidates with less than 2,500 votes (0.43% of the election's overall vote). A week after the first round, Sawyer endorsed Paul Vallas in the runoff election.

== Personal ==
Sawyer is married to Cheryll Aikens Sawyer. They have two children, Sydni Celeste Sawyer and Roderick T. Sawyer Jr.

Sawyer is the son of former Chicago mayor Eugene Sawyer.

== Electoral history ==
=== City Council ===
2011 Chicago 6th ward aldermanic election
Candidate	General election		Runoff election	
Candidate	Votes	%	Votes	%
Roderick T. Sawyer	3,758	24.98	5,109	50.51
Freddrenna M. Lyle	6,696	44.51	5,005	49.49
Richard A. Wooten	2,985	19.84		
Cassandra Goodrum-Burton	950	6.31		
Sekum Walker	343	2.28		
Brian E. Sleet	313	2.08		
Total	15,045	100.00	10,114	100.00

2015 Chicago 6th ward aldermanic election
Candidate	Votes	%
Roderick T. Sawyer (incumbent)	5,990	56.20
Richard A. Wooten	2,800	25.27
Brain T. Garner	1,869	17.53
Total votes	10,659	100.00

2019 Chicago 6th ward aldermanic election
Candidate	General election		Runoff election	
Candidate	Votes	%	Votes	%
Roderick T. Sawyer (incumbent)	5,053	49.94	5,966	53.67
Deborah A. Foster-Bonner	3,159	31.22	5,151	46.33
Richard A. Wooten	1,900	18.78		
Write-ins	7	0.07		
Total	10,119	100.00	11,117	100.00

=== Mayoral ===
2023 Chicago mayoral election
Candidate	General election		Runoff election	
Candidate	Votes	%	Votes	%
Brandon Johnson	122,093	21.63	319,481	52.16
Paul Vallas	185,743	32.90	293,033	47.84
Lori Lightfoot (incumbent)	94,890	16.81		
Chuy García	77,222	13.68		
Willie Wilson	51,567	9.13		
Ja'Mal Green	12,257	2.17		
Kam Buckner	11,092	1.96		
Sophia King	7,191	1.27		
Roderick Sawyer	2,440	0.43		
Write-ins	29	0.01		
Total	564,524	100.00	612,514	100.00
