= 2011 Chicago aldermanic election =

The 2011 Chicago aldermanic election took place on February 22, 2011, to elect the 50 members of the Chicago City Council. The elections were non-partisan, and in races without any candidate receiving an absolute majority of votes runoffs were held on April 5.
