= Melissa Conyears-Ervin =

American politician (born 1975)

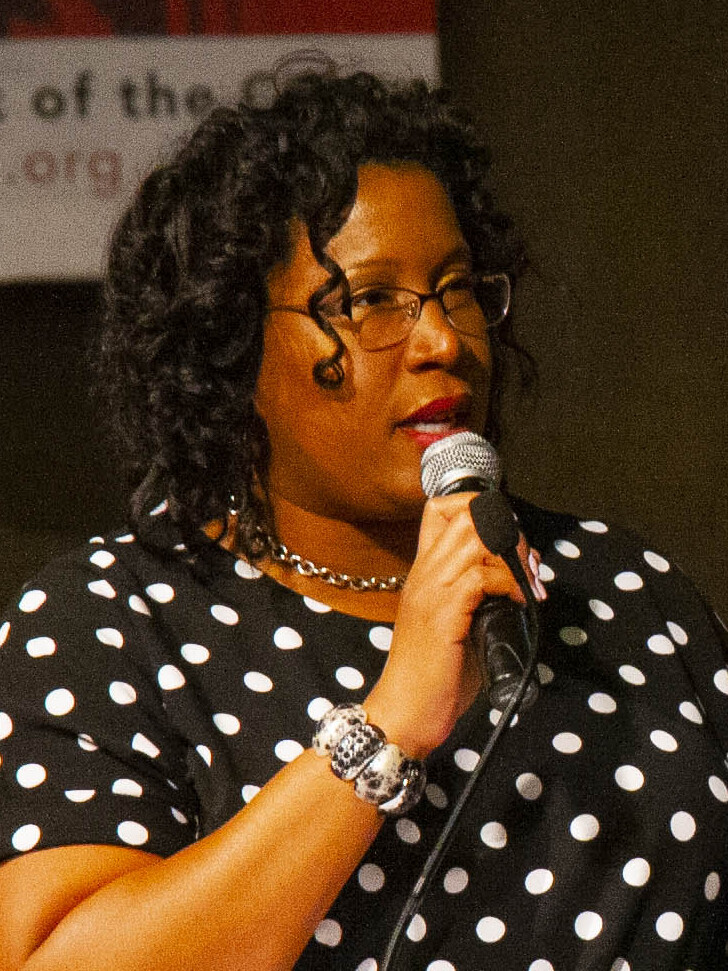
- Conyears-Ervin in 2019

City Treasurer of Chicago
- Incumbent
- Assumed office May 20, 2019
- Preceded by: Kurt Summers

Member of the Illinois House of Representatives from the 10th district
- In office January 11, 2017 – May 20, 2019
- Preceded by: Pamela Reaves-Harris
- Succeeded by: Jawaharial Williams

Personal details
- Born: August 23, 1975 (age 51) Chicago, Illinois, U.S.
- Party: Democratic
- Spouse: Jason Ervin
- Education: Eastern Illinois University (BS); Roosevelt University (MBA)

Melissa Conyears-Ervin (née Conyers; born August 23, 1975) is an American politician and the current Chicago City Treasurer. She was previously a Democratic member of the Illinois House of Representatives, representing the 10th District since 2017. The 10th district includes all or parts of West Garfield Park, East Garfield Park, United Center, Ukrainian Village, River West, Goose Island, Wicker Park and Lincoln Park in Chicago.

== Biography ==
Conyears-Ervin earned a Master of Business Administration from Roosevelt University. Prior to her political career, she worked in the insurance industry at both Allstate and CS Insurance Strategies.

=== 2026 U.S. House Campaign ===
In 2026 Democratic primary for Illinois's 7th congressional district, Conyears-Ervin ran to succeed retiring incumbent Representative Danny Davis. The United Democracy Project, the super PAC affiliated with the American Israel Public Affairs Committee (AIPAC), spent approximately $5 million supporting her candidacy, including a $2.8 million advertising campaign. The outside campaign spending became a point of contention during the primary. In February 2026, WBEZ conducted a survey of Chicago-area Democratic primary candidates asking about their positions on Israel, and said that Conyears-Ervin only gave a straightforward answer to one of their four questions, "saying she would not oppose sending U.S. military aid to Israel today". In a message to WBEZ, Conyears-Ervin also responded to accusations that AIPAC's support would influence her voting in Congress by saying “The idea that a Black woman’s vote is for sale is insulting and racist.” Conyears-Ervin was defeated in the March 2026 primary by State Representative La Shawn Ford.

== Legal issues ==
=== Whistleblower Lawsuit and Abuse of Power ===
The controversies originated from a four-page letter submitted to the city's Law Department by former Chief of Staff Tiffany Harper and Chief Legal Counsel Jennifer Wilkerson, who were terminated in late 2020. The former employees accused Conyears-Ervin of an abuse of power, alleging she required staff to perform personal tasks including planning birthday parties and grocery shopping. The letter further alleged that she hired an assistant treasurer to serve primarily as her personal bodyguard and leveraged her position to force BMO Harris Bank to provide a mortgage for her husband, Chicago Alderman Jason Ervin. To resolve the dispute before a formal lawsuit was filed, the City of Chicago entered into a $100,000 taxpayer-funded settlement with the two former senior staffers in December 2021. Conyears-Ervin denied the allegations, characterizing the claims as politically motivated.

=== Board of Ethics Investigation and Fine ===
Following a multi-year investigation by the Chicago Office of Inspector General into these allegations, the Chicago Board of Ethics found probable cause in November 2023 that Conyears-Ervin had violated the city's Governmental Ethics Ordinance. In April 2024, the Board officially determined that she had committed 12 distinct ethics violations. The findings stated that Conyears-Ervin utilized city employees, email systems, and digital platforms to organize and promote private prayer services, and had improperly terminated the senior staff members who objected to the practices.

In October 2025, Conyears-Ervin entered into a formal settlement agreement with the Board of Ethics and the city's Corporation Counsel to resolve the administrative charges. Under the terms of the agreement, she agreed to personally pay a $30,000 fine.

== Electoral history ==
=== Illinois State House ===
2016 Democratic Primary Illinois House of Representatives District 10
Party	Candidate	Votes	%
Democratic	Melissa Conyears	19,769	100.0%
Total votes		19,769	

2016 General election Illinois House of Representatives District 10
Party	Candidate	Votes	%
Democratic	Melissa Conyears	35,858	83.8
Republican	Mark Spongardi	6,911	16.2
Total votes		42,769	

2018 Democratic Primary Illinois House of Representatives District 10
Party	Candidate	Votes	%
Democratic	Melissa Conyears	12,396	100.0%
Total votes		12,396	

2018 General election Illinois House of Representatives District 10
Party	Candidate	Votes	%
Democratic	Melissa Conyears	31,649	100.0%
Total votes		31,649	

=== Chicago City Treasurer ===
2019 Chicago City Treasurer election
Candidate	First round		Runoff	
Candidate	Vote	%	Vote	%
Melissa Conyears-Ervin	225,385	44.26%	296,293	59.38%
Ameya Pawar	211,759	41.59%	202,714	40.62%
Peter Gariepy	72,068	14.15%	—N/a	—N/a
Write-in	4	0.00%	—N/a	—N/a
