= José Torres (educator) =

American educator and superintendent (1960–2025)

Interim CEO of Chicago Public Schools
- In office July 1, 2021 – September 29, 2021
- Mayor: Lori Lightfoot
- Preceded by: Janice K. Jackson; LaTanya McDade (acting)
- Succeeded by: Pedro Martinez

Superintendent of Elgin Area School District U46
- In office 2008–2014
- Preceded by: Connie Neale
- Succeeded by: Kenneth Arndt

Superintendent of San Ysidro Elementary School District
- In office 2001–2002

Personal details
- Born: March 29, 1960 La Playita, Santurce, Puerto Rico
- Died: May 2, 2025 (aged 65) San Juan, Puerto Rico
- Spouse: Isabel
- Education: University of Maryland, College Park (M.Ed., Ed.D.)
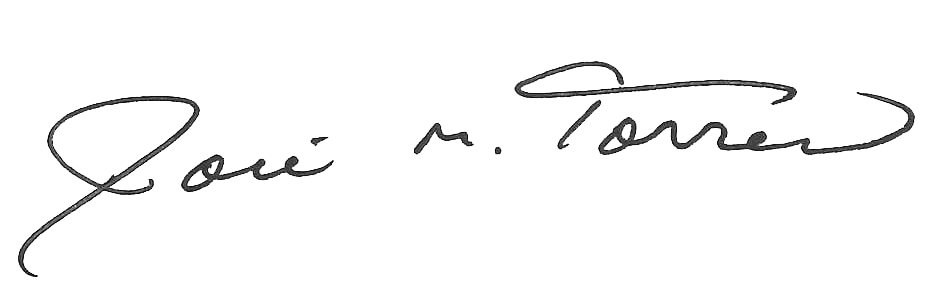
- Signature

José M. Torres (March 29, 1960 – May 2, 2025) was an American educator who served as the interim CEO of Chicago Public Schools (its superintendent position), superintendent of the Elgin Area School District U46, and superintendent of the San Ysidro Elementary School District. He also served as president of the Illinois Mathematics and Science Academy.

== Early life and education ==
Torres was born on March 29, 1960 in La Playita, Santurce, Puerto Rico.

Torres earned a master's degree in education as well as a doctorate in education policy, planning and administration from the University of Maryland at College Park.

== Career ==
Torres was a fellow at the Harvard Graduate School of Education.

=== Early career ===
Torres started his career by working as a middle school teacher and a human relations specialist for Maryland's Montgomery County Public Schools. He spent only a year in this position, teaching language classes, before moving into administrative roles. He held top administrative roles in Baltimore City Public Schools and the National Association of State Boards of Education.

Torres was an associated superintendent of the San Jose Unified School District in 2000 and 2001. He served as superintendent of the San Ysidro Elementary School District in 2001 and 2002. The school board fired him after only six months, citing his "problematic" leadership style as their reason.

Torres worked as assistant superintendent for student services in Maryland's Anne Arundel County Public Schools from 2003 through 2006.

Torres would be made a regional superintendent for Chicago Public Schools, putting him in charge of 25 schools on the city's South Side. He held this role from 2006 through 2008.

In 2005, Torres was a fellow with the Eli Broad Urban Superintendents Academy.

=== Superintendent of Elgin Area School District U46 ===
Torres spent six years as the superintendent of Elgin Area School District U46 in Elgin, Illinois, the state's second-largest school district. He served in this position from 2008 through 2014.

He was credited with implementing a dual language in the school district, in which roughly one-third of students were English language learners (unable to effectively be taught in English, or communicate fluently in English). During his tenure, Torres was also credited with roughly quadrupling the number of people of color holding appointed principal positions. Many of those he appointed were bilingual.

Torres received mixed reception from the community for his decision to implement a grading system that made it so that students could not receive zero-percent grades for work.

=== President of the Illinois Mathematics and Science Academy ===
Torres spent more than six years as president of the Illinois Mathematics and Science Academy in Aurora, retiring at the end of the 2021 school year. He held this role from 2014 through April 2021. During his tenure, the school had to endure losing access to a large portion of its funding during Illinois Budget Impasse, while the school was in the process of expanding.

=== Interim CEO of Chicago Public Schools ===
Two days after retiring, Torres was offered an opportunity to serve as the interim CEO of Chicago Public Schools. He accepted, and it was announced July 12, 2021 that Mayor of Chicago Lori Lightfoot had (in consultation with Miguel del Valle, the president of the Chicago Board of Education) chosen him to, pending the approval of the Chicago Board of Education, be the school district's interim CEO once Janice K. Jackson retired from the position. It was stated that he was not a contender to fill the role permanently.

Torres assumed office on July 1, 2021.

Torres had made it clear upon his appointment that reopening the schools for in-person instruction was a top priority of his. Some parents and educators expressed concern with how close to the planned reopening of schools he waited before unveiling Chicago Public Schools' planned COVID-19 safety protocols, however, Torres stated that they had held off on releasing their plans so as to not move "too far ahead" of their negotiations with the Chicago Teachers Union regarding safety precautions. In late August, Torres expressed his belief that Chicago Public Schools was "very close" to having an agreement with the Chicago Teachers Union on this matter.

Torres expressed that he was dedicated to improving what he regarded to be a "broken" relationship between Chicago Public Schools and the Chicago Teachers Union.

On September 15, 2021, Mayor Lightfoot announced that Pedro Martinez would be succeeding Torres, being appointed the permanent CEO. Martinez took office September 29, ending Torres's tenure as acting superintendent.

== Personal life and death ==
Torres' wife, Isabel Torres, is a teacher and instructional coach.

Torres died on May 2, 2025, at the age of 65. He was survived by his wife and three children.
