= Holberg =

Holberg may refer to:

- Holberg, British Columbia, a community in British Columbia
- Holberg (crater), a crater on Mercury
- Holberg Suite, a suite of five movements written by Edvard Grieg
- The Holberg Prize, established by the government of Norway
- The Holberg Medal, an award to a Danish author of fiction or writer on science

== People with the surname ==
- Brittany Holberg (born 1973), woman currently on death row in the U.S. state of Texas
- Christen Nielsen Holberg (1625–1686), Norwegian Army officer, father of Ludvig
- Joe Holberg (born 1987), Entrepreneur, author, and Chicago politician
- Ludvig Holberg (1684–1754), Norwegian-born Danish writer
- Mary Liz Holberg (born 1959), Minnesota politician
- Waldemar Holberg (1883–1927), Danish boxer
