= 2027 Chicago mayoral election =

Mayoral election in Illinois, US

- February 23, 2027
Incumbent Mayor
Brandon Johnson

The 2027 Chicago mayoral election will be held on February 23, 2027, to elect the mayor of Chicago. If no candidate receives a majority of votes, a runoff election will be held on April 6, 2027. Incumbent mayor Brandon Johnson is running for re-election against a field of thirteen challengers that includes state officials, county officials, businessmen, and a member of the U.S. House of Representatives.

Johnson has faced low approval ratings throughout his term as mayor, with his administration facing significant pushback from the city council and his failure to pass the "Bring Chicago Home" ordinance was seen as a setback for his tax agenda. His approval rating were in the mid-20s to low-30s throughout late 2025 and early 2026, failing to reach the 50% benchmark often necessary for re-election. In an article by The New York Times in July 2026, it was noted that Johnson faced a difficult path to re-election due to eroding support, the city’s financial issues, growing disapproval ratings and lackluster fundraising to his re-election bid.

The election is officially non-partisan, with its winner being elected to a four-year term. It is part of the 2027 Chicago elections, which include concurrent elections for City Council, City Clerk, and City Treasurer.

== Campaign ==
Incumbent first term mayor Brandon Johnson was elected with 52% of the vote in the runoff of the 2023 election. His approval ratings in the latter portion of his term have hovered at about 31%. His administration has faced significant pushback from the city council and his failure to pass the "Bring Chicago Home" ordinance was seen as a setback for his tax agenda. His approval rating were in the mid-20s to low-30s throughout late 2025 and early 2026, failing to reach the 50% benchmark often necessary for re-election. In a 2025 article by The Wall Street Journal, Johnson was called "America's Worst Mayor". In an interview in late July 2026, Johnson said he was in no rush to announce a re-election campaign while also defending his record and agenda. In an article by The New York Times the following month, it was noted that Johnson faced a difficult path to re-election due to eroding support, the city’s financial issues, growing disapproval ratings and lackluster fundraising to a potential re-election bid.

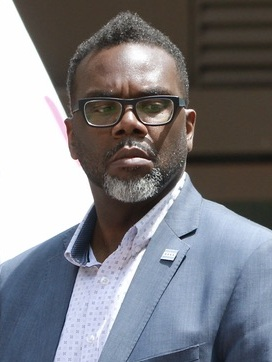
Incumbent Mayor Brandon Johnson has faced low approval ratings throughout his term and has been seen as vulnerable in a re-election campaign

On October 6, 2025, Joe Holberg, an entrepreneur who founded and sold a money management firm, became the first candidate to formally enter the race. On November 17, Cook County Treasurer Maria Pappas announced her intent to run while not formally launching a campaign. She also simultaneously ran for the 2026 County Treasurer election unopposed, stating that race is her first priority and that she is in the mayoral race "unofficially" until the Treasurer election concludes. Pappas has routinely challenged Johnson's more progressive taxation proposals. In September, Pappas also commissioned the first poll of the election, a head-to-head poll between her and Johnson with a sample size of 800 that showed Pappas having a 56%-23% lead with 21% being undecided.

On January 6, 2026, U.S. representative Mike Quigley announced his intent to run. He said he would also simultaneously running for re-election to his congressional seat in 2026 and make a formal announcement after the March primary. In his announcement Quigley stated that "Chicago is in crisis" and that it cannot tax its way out of financial trouble centering his campaign around a pro-business outlook. In May 2026, businessman and three-time mayoral candidate Willie Wilson established an exploratory committee for a potential fourth mayoral bid.

On June 3, outgoing Illinois Comptroller and 2019 mayoral candidate Susana Mendoza announced her candidacy for mayor under the slogan “progress that people can actually feel” promising to reduce rent while also increasing welfare benefits. Mendoza’s campaign was noted for her tough on crime stance and for running “to the right” of Johnson’s agenda. On June 16, Cook County Board of Review member and former alderman George Cardenas announced his bid. On June 25, former operating chair of the Chicago Housing Authority Matt Brewer announced his candidacy, a month after he was ousted from the role by Johnson following disagreements about the board's choice for the new CEO for the CHA. Brewer has campaigned on a pro-business and affordability-focused platform, calling for increased housing development, business growth and a public safety strategy focused on prevention, intervention and enforcement. On June 27, Quigley formally announced his campaign.

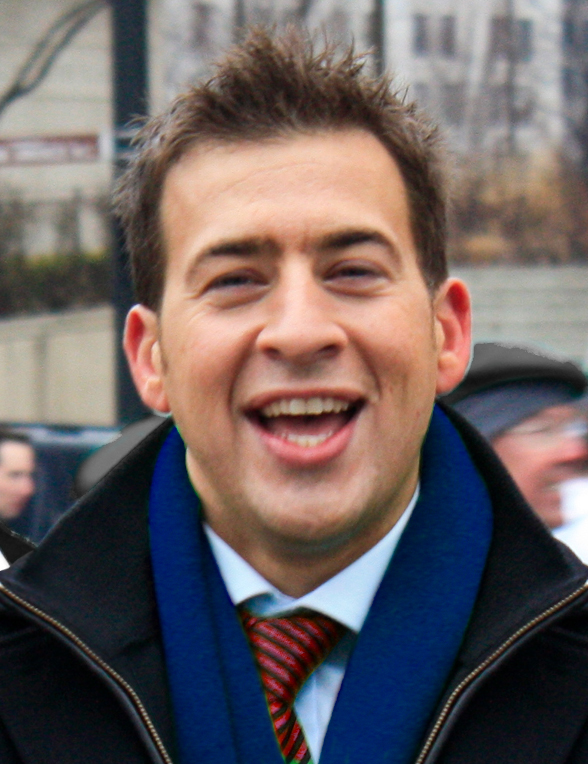
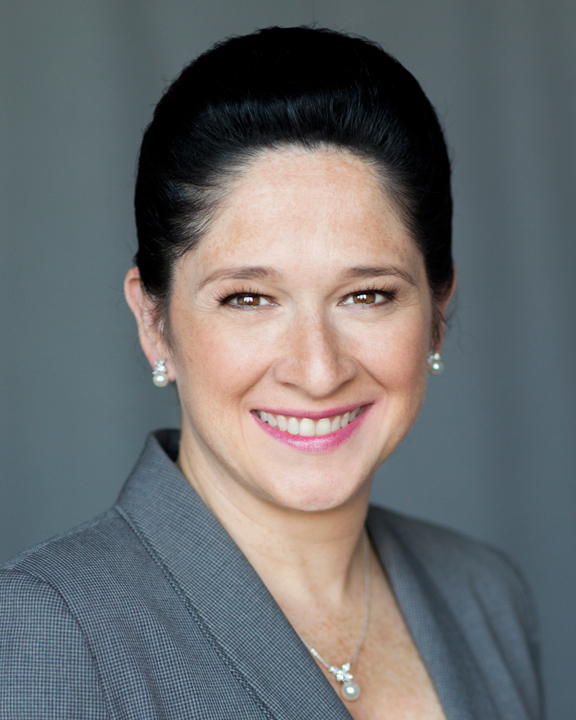
Early polling data have shown state officials Alexi Giannoulias and Susana Mendoza as the leading contenders against Johnson

By June 30, Illinois Secretary of State Alexi Giannoulias had approximately $21.85 million in campaign cash on hand, substantially more than the other mayoral contenders, dwarfing the $631,309 cash on hand by Johnson, $376,676 by Quigley, and $278,000 by Pappas. In a poll held in July 2026 only 13.6% of Chicago residents wanted mayor Johnson to run again, while 58% said they were not excited for a potential Johnson campaign. In the same poll 53% of residents were excited for a Giannoulias mayoral bid, and 47% were excited for Mendoza's bid. On July 14, 2023 mayoral runner-up Paul Vallas ruled out running again while acknowledging that Giannoulias had the support of several unions. Two days later, Chicago Flips Red co-founder Danielle Carter-Walters announced her candidacy as the Republican-leaning candidate of the election. A week later, lobbyist John Kelly announced his candidacy highlighting his experience working with city officials while representing the White Sox.

On August 2, Giannoulias announced his candidacy for mayor claiming Mayor Johnson "has not met the moment" and vowing to hire 1,000-1,500 additional police officers by 2030. Giannoulias also called for universal pre-K, raising the minimum wage, expanding affordable housing and reforming property taxes. Three days later on August 5, businessman Willie Wilson declared his candidacy. On August 10, Liam Stanton suspended his campaign and subsequently endorsed Giannoulias. By the end of the month, an M3 Strategies poll among public workers found Johnson, Giannoulias and Mendoza as the top three leaders of the election.

On September 13, Johnson formally announced his re-election campaign at the DuSable Black History Museum. By the time of Johnson's announcement, he only had $650,000 in his campaign fund, compared Giannoulias who had amassed $22 million for his campaign fund. In his campaign announcement, Johnson painted himself as the only progressive candidate in the field, while WBEZ had already noted Giannoulias as the front-runner in the race. After his re-election announcement, The Chicago Sun-Times noted obstacles in Johnson's re-election ranging from lackluster campaign fundraising, weaker union coalitions, hesitant black voters and stronger opponents specifically in Giannoulias and Quigley, however also mentioned Johnson had the advantage of the incumbency and touting his progressive agenda such as affordability.

On September 22, candidate and attorney William J. Quinlan filed a lawsuit in Cook County Circuit Court against the candidacies of Giannoulias and Quigley, as well as Maria Pappas, who has yet to declare her candidacy. The suit is due to Giannoulis, Quigley and Pappas running for the mayorship while also running for re-election for their respective offices. While George Cardenas is also running for re-election for the Cook County Board of Review, he is not listed in the lawsuit. This lawsuit was dismissed by Cook County Circuit Court Judge Eve Reilly on October 14, who said it was filed prematurely. Quinlan stated he will be appealing the ruling.

Both Mike Quigley and Maria Pappas would win re-election in the 2026 midterms, with Pappas running unopposed, and Quigley won comfortably with 77.2%. Pappas would offically announce her candidacy on November 2. On October 26 on the deadline to file to run for mayor in the election, the following individuals submitted their petitions to appear on the ballot: Susana Mendoza, Lisa Nee, George Cardenas, Maria Pappas, William Quinlan, Joe Holberg, Danielle Carter-Walters, Zoe Ma, Alexi Giannoulias, John Kelly, Matt Brewer, Mike Quigley, Willie Wilson and Brandon Johnson.

Following the November 2, 2026, deadline for filing objections, 12 of the 16 mayoral candidates faced challenges to their candidacies. Incumbent Mayor Brandon Johnson faced two objections to his nominating petitions, including one brought on behalf of Willie Wilson's campaign alleging irregularities involving signatures and petition circulators. Johnson's campaign expressed confidence that he would remain on the ballot. Objections were also filed against Susana Mendoza and John Kelly. Kelly's candidacy faced a residency challenge after questions arose over his suburban properties. The Chicago Sun-Times reported that Kelly had constructed a $4.4 million home in Homer Glen. NBC Chicago had previously reported that a December 2025 court filing signed by Kelly identified him and his wife as residents of Orland Park. Kelly said the statement was an error and maintained that his Gold Coast condominium had been his legal residence since October 2024.

== Candidates ==
=== Declared ===
Candidate	Experience	Announced	Ref
Matt Brewer	Operating chair of Chicago Housing Authority (2024–2026); Chicago Housing Authority commissioner (2013–present); Co-owner of The Wieners Circle	June 25, 2026; Website	
George Cardenas	Member of the Cook County Board of Review from the 1st district (2022–present); Alderman from the 12th ward (2003–2022)	June 16, 2026; Website	
Danielle Carter-Walters	Co-founder of Chicago Flips Red; Fitness Trainer	July 16, 2026; Website	
Alexi Giannoulias	Illinois Secretary of State (2023–present); Illinois Treasurer (2007–2011)	August 2, 2026; Website	
Joe Holberg	Founder and CEO of Holberg Financial (2015–2023)	October 6, 2025; Website	
Brandon Johnson	Incumbent Mayor (2023–present); Cook County commissioner (2018–2023)	September 13, 2026; Website	
John Kelly	CEO of All-Circo Consulting Firm (2007–present); Co-founder of Sentinel Security	July 28, 2026; Website	
Susana Mendoza	Illinois Comptroller (2016–present); Chicago City Clerk (2011–2016); 2019 mayoral candidate	June 3, 2026; Website	
Maria Pappas	County Treasurer (1998–present)	November 2, 2026	
Mike Quigley	U.S. representative from Illinois's 5th congressional district (2009–present); Cook County commissioner (1998–2009)	June 27, 2026; Website	
Willie Wilson	Founder and CEO of Omar Medical Supplies (1997–present); 2015, 2019 and 2023 mayoral candidate	August 5, 2026; Website	

==== Minor candidates ====
- Zoe Ma, community advocate, real estate developer and chair of the Cook County Green Party
- Lisa Nee, cardiologist
- William J. Quinlan, attorney

=== Withdrawn ===
- Liam Stanton, businessman (endorsed Giannoulias)

=== Declined ===
- Kam Buckner, state representative from the 26th district (2019–present) and candidate for mayor in 2023
- Bill Conway, Chicago City Council alderman (2023–present) and candidate for Cook County state's attorney in 2020 (running for re-election)
- Rahm Emanuel, former mayor (2011–2019)
- Chuy Garcia, U.S. representative from Illinois's 4th congressional district (2019–present) and candidate for mayor in 2015 and 2023
- Janice Jackson, CEO of Chicago Public Schools (2017–2021)
- Raymond Lopez, Chicago alderman from the 15th ward (2015–present) and candidate for mayor in 2023 (endorsed Mendoza)
- Silvana Tabares, Chicago alderman from the 23rd ward (2018–present) (endorsed Mendoza)
- Paul Vallas, former CEO of Chicago Public Schools (1995–2001), candidate for mayor in 2019 and 2023, Democratic nominee for lieutenant governor in 2014, and candidate for governor in 2002
- Andre Vasquez, Chicago alderman from the 40th ward (2019–present) (running for re-election)

== Endorsements ==
Alexi Giannoulias

Local officials

- Michelle A. Harris, alderman from the 8th ward (2006–present)
- Brian Hopkins, alderman from the 2nd ward (2015–present)
- Emma Mitts, alderman from the 37th ward (2000–present)

Individuals

- Liam Stanton, businessman and former mayoral candidate

Labor unions

- Teamsters Joint Council 25
- SEIU Locals 1 and 73
- Chicago Laborers District Council
- International Union of Operating Engineers Local 150
- Mid-America Carpenters Regional Council
Brandon Johnson

Individuals

- Stacy Davis Gates, president of the Chicago Teachers Union (2022–present)

Labor unions

- Chicago Teachers Union
Susana Mendoza

Local officials

- Raymond Lopez, alderman from the 15th ward (2015–present) and 2023 mayoral candidate
- Silvana Tabares, alderman from the 23rd ward (2018–present) and former state representative (2013–2018)
Mike Quigley

Local officials

- Bennett Lawson, alderman from the 44th ward (2023–present)
Willie Wilson

Local officials

- Richard Boykin, member of the Cook County Board of Commissioners (2014–2018) and former candidate for IL-07 in 2026

== Opinion polling ==
Poll source	Date(s) administered	Sample size	Margin of error	Alexi Giannoulias	Brandon Johnson	Susana Mendoza	Willie Wilson	Mike Quigley	Maria Pappas	Others	Undecided						
Poll source	Date(s) administered	Sample size	Margin of error	University of Chicago; Mansueto Institute	September 13–23, 2026	935 (LV)	± 4.11%	24.9%	13.6%	Others	Undecided	9.5%	6.0%	3.6%	3.3%	5.2%	33.9%

Hypothetical polling

Brandon Johnson vs. Maria Pappas

Poll source	Date(s) administered	Sample size (Note: Key: A – all adults RV – registered voters LV – likely voters V – unclear)	Margin of error	Brandon Johnson	Maria Pappas	Undecided
Victory Research (R) (Note: Poll sponsored by Pappas)	Sep 27–29, 2025	800 (LV)	± 3.5%	23%	56%	21%

Poll source	Date(s) administered	Sample size	Margin of error	Anthony Beale	Kam Buckner	Bill Conway	Alexi Giannoulias	Ja'Mal Green	Luis Gutiérrez	Brandon Johnson	Susana Mendoza	Paul Vallas	Gilbert Villegas	Willie Wilson	Other/ undecided
M3 Strategies	Feb 21–22, 2025	696 (LV)	± 3.7%	4%	6%	6%	21%	3%	5%	8%	12%	27%	2%	6%	–

== Notes ==
Partisan clients
