= Janice K. Jackson =

American educator, education administrator and former schools superintendent

Janice Jackson

7th CEO of Chicago Public Schools
- In office December 8, 2017 – June 30, 2021
- Mayor: Rahm Emanuel; Lori Lightfoot
- Preceded by: Forrest Claypool
- Succeeded by: LaTanya McDade (acting); José Torres (interim); Pedro Martinez

Personal details
- Born: May 22, 1977 (age 48) Chicago, Illinois, U.S.
- Spouse: Torrence Price (m. 2017)
- Education: Chicago State University (BA, MA); University of Illinois, Chicago (MEd, EdD)
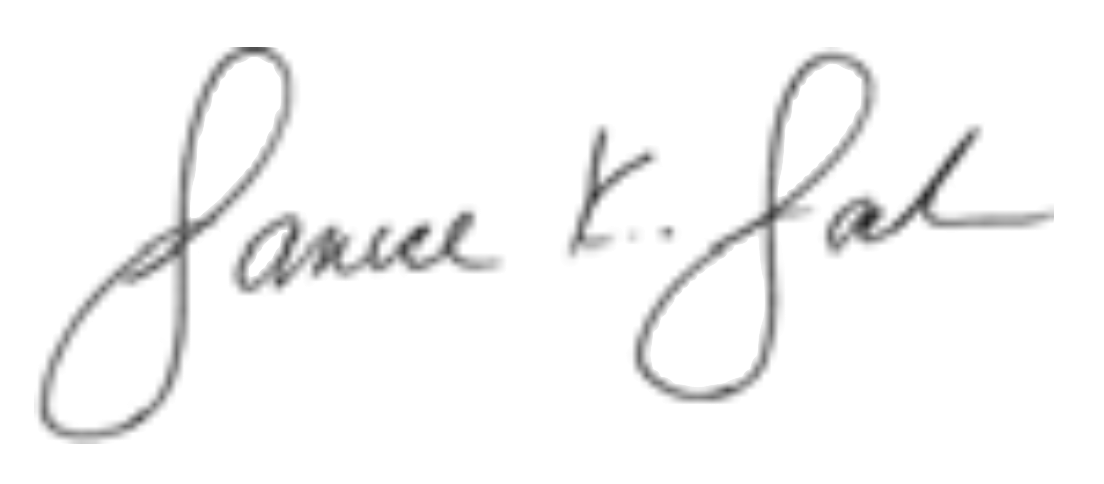
- Signature

Janice K. Jackson (born May 22, 1977) is an American educator, educational administrator and former schools superintendent. Jackson was the CEO of the Chicago Public Schools, the school district's superintendent position, from December 8, 2017, until June 30, 2021. Prior to her term as superintendent, Jackson was the chief education officer of the district.

== Childhood and education ==
Jackson was born on Chicago's South Side at Englewood Hospital. Jackson was the third-born of five children, and grew up in a working class household. Her father worked as a taxi driver. At one time, she, her parents, and her four siblings all lived in a two-bedroom apartment in the Auburn Gresham neighborhood. Jackson attended Cook Elementary School in the Auburn Gresham neighborhood. Jackson attended Hyde Park Career Academy, graduating in 1995. Jackson attended college at Chicago State University. She graduated in December 1999, having earned a bachelor's degree in history and secondary education.

== Early career and continued education ==
Jackson's education career began as a social studies teacher at South Shore Community Academy High School. Before receiving a teaching job at South Shore Community Academy High School (part of the Chicago Public Schools), Jackson worked as a cashier at an Express store. While working as a teacher at South Shore Community High School, Jackson continued to study at Chicago State University, getting a master's degree in history. Jackson was involved in the designing of a new Chicago Public Schools institution, Al Raby High School. In 2003, she helped to obtain a $500,000 grant from the Bill & Melinda Gates Foundation to underwrite its establishment. The school opened in 2004, when Jackson was the age of 27. The school, located in a previously closed Chicago Public School building located near the Garfield Park Conservatory in the East Garfield Park neighborhood, was centered on providing intensive support for a small student body of under 400, emphasizing the study of technology, science, and the environment. Jackson would become the school's principal. She would later recount that she had initially planned simply to help to design the school, and had no original intent of being its principal. The high school had one of the city's lowest dropout rates.

While Al Raby High School's principal, Jackson began attending University of Illinois at Chicago to earn a second master's degree in education, this time in leadership and administration. She continued University of Illinois at Chicago, studying in its Urban Education Leadership doctorate program. She has considered Steve Tozer, who headed the program, to be her mentor. She completed her doctorate in 2010. While she was studying for her doctorate, she and her partner Torrence Price, who she had met in 2005, had a daughter.

Jackson was selected by CEO of Chicago Public Schools (superintendent) Arne Duncan to again create a new school for the district, George Westinghouse College Prep. She became the school's principal. In 2014, Jackson moved to working in the administrative departments of Chicago Public Schools, first working as one of the school district's thirteen community-network chief. This charged her with the oversight of 26 schools with 14,000 students.

== Chief education officer of Chicago Public Schools ==
Jackson became the chief education officer of Chicago Public Schools in 2015. Jackson and CEO of Chicago Public Schools Forrest Claypool did not see eye-to-eye.

== CEO of Chicago Public Schools ==
On December 8, 2017, Jackson took office as the interim CEO of Chicago Public Schools, after Forest Claypool resigned. She was soon after made permanent CEO by the Chicago Board of Education (the city's school board). Jackson was the first head of the Chicago Public Schools in two decades to have had direct experience as an educator.

Jackson inherited a number of existing struggles in the school district. The school district was seeing a decline in enrollment. There was overcrowding in certain schools, and underpopulation in others. The Illinois State Board of Education had placed a monitor on Chicago Public School's special education program after discovering that they had held up and denied the provision of some services to students. Jackson took office after a number of scandals had marred the Chicago Public Schools, including scandals which led to the resignations of her the two previous CEO's, Barbara Byrd-Bennett and Forrest Claypool. Additionally, shortly before she took office, several school closings had been announced.

Jackson established the Great Expectations mentoring program, which seeks to encourage black and hispanic men to pursue careers in leadership at Chicago Public Schools, where they are underrepresented in administrative positions. In 2018, Jackson created an Office of Equity, making Chicago the largest city whose school district had an equity office. In early 2018, Education Week recognized Jackson as one of their "Leaders to Learn From".

On June 1, 2018, the Chicago Tribune published an investigative report which detailed that Chicago Public Schools had, for over a decade, been mishandling sexual abuse cases. In reaction to these revelations, Jackson published a four-page action plan that was distributed to Chicago Public School employees and earmarked $500,000 for a comprehensive review to be headed by Maggie Hickey (a former United States attorney and former Illinois executive inspector general) and the law firm Schiff Hardin. She also moved to conduct fingerprinting and background checking of all employees entering the schools for the coming school year. She changed policy, moving to forbid employees from accessing school buildings when an accusation made by a student against them is still being investigated. She also enhanced the definitions of inappropriate conduct in the school system's policies, and created a new office (the Office of Student Protections and Title IX) to handle cases of student-on-student sexual harassment and sexual abuse. Despite these actions, she still received criticism accusing her of being ineffective in her response to the revelations. She was also criticized for failing to attend meetings of the Illinois State Board of Education and the Chicago City Council on the matter, to which she had been invited.

Jackson became a topic of political discussion during the 2019 Chicago mayoral election. Incumbent mayor Rahm Emanuel had withdrawn from the race, and many speculated that the next mayor would replace Jackson. During a debate between candidates Toni Preckwinkle and Lori Lightfoot during the mayoral runoff, both candidates were asked whether Jackson should remain in her position. Preckwinkle gave her support to Jackson, while Lightfoot was more critical of Jackson, criticizing the sexual abuse revelations as, "the epic failure of leadership by Rahm Emanuel and Janice Jackson". However, Lightfoot did not commit to firing Jackson if elected, and conceded, "I'm willing to hear her out, but she is going to have to demonstrate to me that she understands she made a mistake and rectify that with the parents and the teachers and the kids". Jackson offered to meet with each of the candidates. Four days prior to the election, which was, by then, seen as a very likely victory for Lightfoot, she met with Lightfoot at the Boyce Building.

After Lori Lightfoot took office in May 2019, she announced that she would retain Jackson in her position for at least an interim period. On June 3, 2019, she announced that she would be permanently retaining Jackson as CEO. In October 2019, there was a strike by the Chicago Teachers Union. Jackson has criticized the Chicago Teachers Union for being overly-political. A major matter in the last two years of her tenure was the impact of the COVID-19 pandemic on education

In May 2021, Jackson announced she would be stepping-down as CEO on June 30, 2021. This ended her 22-year career in Chicago Public Schools. After announcing her planned departure, Jackson's leadership in the role of CEO was praised by Mayor Lightfoot and president of the Chicago Board of Education Miguel del Valle.

== Subsequent career ==
In September 2021, Jackson announced that she would be the CEO of HOPE Chicago, a scholarship program for Chicago students. Jackson declined to run 2023 Chicago mayoral election, claiming to have no interest in seeking the office. There was later some level of speculation about a possible 2027 mayoral run by Jackson, but she again denied interest in running.

In 2024, Jackson signed an open letter opposing Mayor Brandon Johnson's ouster of her successor, Pedro Martinez.

In July 2025, Jackson began working as the executive director of the Aspen Institute Education & Policy Program. In August 2025, Jackson began working as an advisor to education arm of The Vistria Group, a private equity firm.

== Personal life ==
Jackson married Torrence Price in 2017.
