= Pedro Martinez (school administrator) =

Mexican-American school administrator

- Portrait, circa 2025

Massachusetts Commissioner of Elementary and Secondary Education
- Incumbent
- Assumed office July 1, 2025
- Governor: Maura Healey
- Secretary of Education: Patrick Tutwiler
- Preceded by: Jeff Riley; Russel Johnston (acting)

8th CEO of Chicago Public Schools
- In office September 29, 2021 – June 18, 2025
- Mayor: Lori Lightfoot; Brandon Johnson
- Preceded by: Janice K. Jackson; LaTanya McDade (acting); José Torres (interim)
- Succeeded by: Bogdana Chkoumbova (acting); Macquline King (interim)

Superintendent of San Antonio Independent School District
- In office June 2015 – September 28, 2021
- Preceded by: Sylvester Perez
- Succeeded by: Jaime Aquino; Robert Jaklich (interim)

Superintendent of Washoe County School District
- In office June 2012 – November 2014
- Preceded by: Heath Morrison
- Succeeded by: Traci Davis acting

Personal details
- Born: 1969 or 1970 (age 56–57) Mexico
- Spouse: Benice Alejo
- Children: 2
- Education: University of Illinois, Urbana-Champaign (BA); DePaul University (MBA)
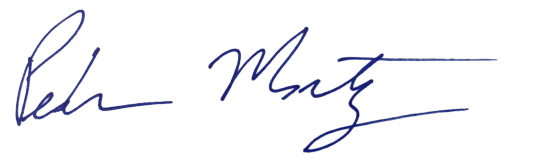
- Signature

Pedro Martinez (born 1969/1970) is a Mexican-American school administrator serving as the Commissioner of Elementary and Secondary Education in Massachusetts. He previously served as the CEO of Chicago Public Schools (the superintendent position of Chicago Public Schools) from 2021 to 2025. Before working in Chicago, he had also served as superintendent of the San Antonio Independent School District and superintendent of the Washoe County School District.

== Early life and education ==
Martinez was born in Mexico, and emigrated from there to the United States at the age of six. The eldest of twelve children in his immediate family after moving to the United States he grew up in Chicago.

Martinez attended high school at Chicago's Benito Juarez Community Academy. He graduated from the University of Illinois at Urbana-Champaign in 1992 with a bachelor's degree in accounting, and graduated from DePaul University in 2006 with a Masters in Business Administration. He later received a fellowship from the Public Education Leadership Project at Harvard University, and graduated from the Broad Superintendents Academy.

== Early career ==
After his graduation from the University of Illinois, Martinez first worked as an auditor, including for Catholic Charities.

In 2003, Martinez began to work as the budget director for Chicago Public Schools, serving under Arne Duncan, then the district's CEO. In 2008, he was made chief financial officer, and in 2009 he was made regional superintendent for the West Side of Chicago. Two months after being made regional superintendent, he left to work in Nevada.

Martinez worked as a deputy superintendent for the Washoe County School District. He was credited with helping to increase high school graduation rates there.

In April 2011, Martinez was hired as the deputy superintendent of instruction by the Clark County School District, succeeding the retiring Linda Kohut-Rost.

== Superintendent of Washoe County School District ==
In June 2012, Martinez was hired by the Washoe County School District, succeeding the departing Heath Morrison. Washoe County is the second-largest school district in Nevada. He was fired on July 22, 2014 after being accused of deceiving the district about his credentials as a certified public accountant, as he was not a licensed one. His firing had been done by the school board in violation of open meeting laws, and wound up costing the taxpayers a half-million dollars in legal settlement fees to Martinez. He was reinstated after his firing had been found to have been illegal. Martinez formally left the post of superintendent in November 2014, and was succeeded by Traci Davis. (Note: In November 2014, Davis succeeded Martinez as Washoe County School District superintendent, serving on an acting basis. After a contentious process, she was appointed in July 2015 to serve as superintendent on a permanent basis.)

== Superintendent of San Antonio Independent School District ==
Martinez became the superintendent of the San Antonio Independent School District in June 2015. During his tenure, the district became the fastest-improving district in the state of Texas, and drew national attention to Martinez and his work. Its state ratings went from an "F" to a "B" during his tenure.

Martinez utilized census data to help calculate the extent of "need" at each of the district's schools. He also placed low-rated schools into the hands of private organizations, such as charter school operators, in order to improve their performances. Such a practice has received criticism from many public education advocates. He would later state that Texas laws placed him in a situation where he had few options but to privatize and hand schools over to charter operators, arguing that the alternative would have been being forced to close those schools. Upon his departure from the district, Alejandra Lopez, the president of the teachers union San Antonio Alliance of Teachers and Support Personnel, claimed she felt Martinez had failed to hear or respect stakeholders' opinions when making decisions regarding these schools, claiming, “Pedro Martinez’s tenure here was characterized by a pro-charter agenda that is a hallmark of the Broad Academy that he attended, and very top-down decision-making.”

During the COVID-19 pandemic, Martinez was credited with pioneering ways for large city school districts to keep their schools open, while keeping students and faculty safe. He partnered with a local nonprofit, Community Labs, to provide free COVID-19 testing at all school campuses, coordinated with vaccine clinics. Texas governor Greg Abbott issued a ban on mask mandates and vaccine mandates. However, Martinez had the school district adopt a mask mandate. He also issued a vaccine mandate requiring for all staff to be vaccinated, which Texas Attorney General Ken Paxton sued the district over.

Martinez left the job in 2021 to accept a new one as head of schools in Chicago. The San Antonio Independent School District trustees accepted his resignation on September 20, 2021, voting to release Martinez from his contract with the district effective September 28. They also voted to appoint Robert Jaklich to serve as his interim successor beginning the following day. Before his departure, president of the school board Christina Martinez credited him with helping to improve its state academic rating, increasing its graduation rates, and expanding dual language programs. Others who praised him included former San Antonio mayor Henry Cisneros and the San Antonio Express-News editorial board.

== CEO of Chicago Public Schools ==
On September 15, 2021, Chicago mayor Lori Lightfoot announced that she would nominate Martinez for appointment as the CEO (superintendent) of Chicago Public Schools. Martinez declared that he expected to take office in the final week of September. On September 22, the Chicago Board of Education unanimously voted to approve his appointment as CEO, to take office on September 29. As scheduled, Martinez took office on September 29, 2021. He is the first Hispanic individual to serve as CEO of the district on a permanent basis. The district is the third-largest school district in the United States.

In July 2024, Mayor Brandon Johnson (Lightfoot's successor) began suggesting that the school district should take on a new loan in order to cover expenses required to meet the Chicago Teachers Union's contract renegotiation demands related to the funding of pensions and contracts. However, numerous higher-ups within the school district as well as the school board took issue, expressing concern over the prospect of taking on additional debt obligation considering its existing debts. Martinez regarded the plan to be "exhorbitant" and financially reckless. Amid a resultant standstill, the teachers union publicly lambasted Martinez, blaming him and pejoratively labeling him a "Lightfoot holdover". Mayor Johnson came into conflict with Martinez, and privately requested his resignation (something he would attempt to publicly deny having done). On September 24, the Chicago Tribune published an op-ed by Martinez in which he outlined his reasons for refusing Johnson's request for him to resign. With all of this occurring before a period of change for the board (with the 2024 board election set to reshape its composition from an entirely-appointed board to a hybrid board), the incumbent board members all declined to dismiss Martinez. Ultimately, this conflict led to the entirety of the board (including board president Jianan Shi) to tender their own resignations in early October. 41 out of the 50 members of the Chicago City Council (including some of Johnson's key council allies) signed an open letter criticizing Johnson's move to quickly reshape the board only weeks before the school board election. In the days that followed, Johnson appointed new members and a new board president. In the months that have followed, Johnson's desire to oust Martinez continued. On December 20, 2024, a new board of Johnson appointees voted unanimously to terminate Martinez from his position. Since it is a "without cause" dismissal, the terms of Martinez's contract allow him to remain as CEO for six months (until June 2025) and collect a severance payment in excess of $130,000.

During his ouster, an open letter supporting Martinez and opposing Johnson's efforts to oust him was signed by two of Martinez's predecessors: Arne Duncan and Janice K. Jackson. It was also signed by Jesse Ruiz, who had previously served as interim superintendent. Others who signed the letter included Chicago Alderperson Pat Dowell and Chicago City Clerk Anna Valencia

Martinez sued the Board of Education for barring him from participating in negotiations related to the teachers union contract. In a December 2024 ruling granting a temporary restraining order, a judge of the Cook County Circuit Court ruled that the Board of Education could not prohibit him from participating in the negotiations, as this amounted to "obstructing" Martinez from "performance of his job duties." The judge further ruled that school board members themselves could not attend negotiations without receiving approval from Martinez.

In February 2025, Martinez applied for the superintendency of the school district of Clark County, Nevada; and was in consideration for the position. Martinez was one of six initial finalists interviewed by the Clark County School Board in its search for a new superintendent. However, he was eliminated from consideration when the Clark County School Board further narrowed its search to three finalists.

== Massachusetts Commissioner of Elementary and Secondary Education ==
On July 1, 2025, Martinez took office as the commissioner of the Massachusetts Department of Elementary and Secondary Education. He was appointed with 9 votes in favor and 2 abstentions in a vote by the board. 42 different people had applied for the position. He described his priorities in the new position as improving teacher recruitment and retention, improving bilingual education, and strengthening literacy for Massachusetts students. Teacher's unions in Massachusetts expressed some concerns, however, in part because of his past conflicts with teacher's unions during his time at Chicago Public Schools.

== Personal life ==
Martinez is married to Benice Alejo. He has two children.

In 2020, an honoree of the Great Immigrants Award named by Carnegie Corporation of New York
