= Clinée Hedspeth =

Former government worker

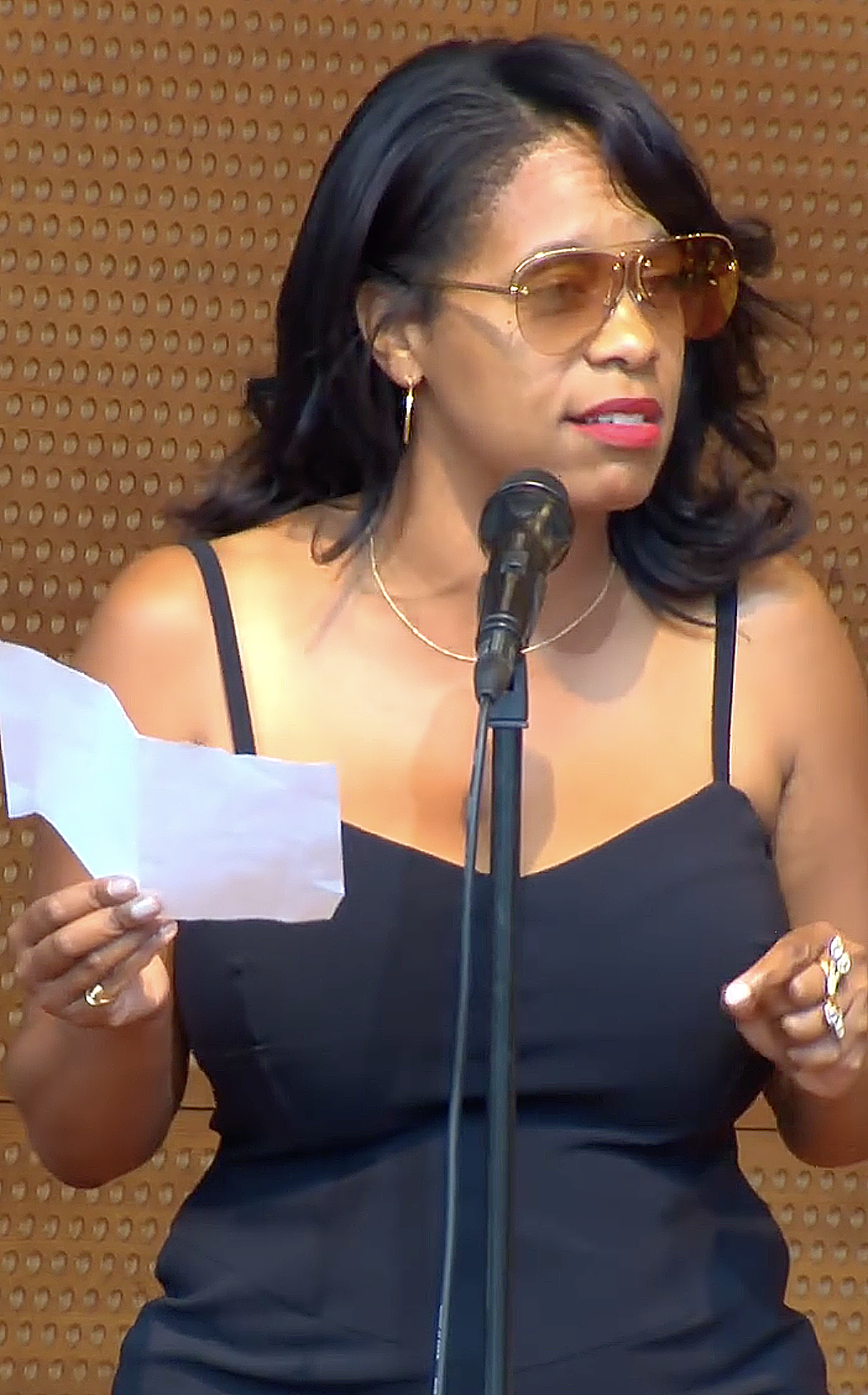
- Hedspeth in 2024

Personal details
- Born: Seattle, Washington, U.S.
- Occupation: Former government worker

Clinée Hedspeth is an American former government worker for the city of Chicago, publicly recognized for her short and controversial tenure as the commissioner of the Department of Cultural Affairs and Special Events (DCASE). Appointed by her college friend and then Chicago mayor Brandon Johnson, Hedspeth served in her role from March 2024 until her resignation in September of 2025 – being placed on the “ineligible for rehire” list by the mayor’s office.

== Public controversies ==
Reportedly, Hedspeth's first months on duty were marked with formal complaints and staff turnover. City record investigations and anonymous employee statements to the press fueled a season-long news cycle alleging the department commissioner expected high-ranking staffers to carry her belongings, walk her dog and accompany her at public events in ways they described as resembling a personal entourage. One of several detailed reports concerning Hedspeth’s behavior described multiple incidents. The report alleged that Hedspeth cursed at an employee in front of visitors after the employee took longer than expected to provide business cards. The complainant also stated that Hedspeth screamed at children making noise during a subsequent event, calling it “one of the worst things” they had ever seen. Additional allegations included threats toward staff, with one employee told they were “on thin ice” and to “watch your back,” alongside a pattern of restricting senior staffers access to events and tickets normally within their responsibilities.

Reportedly, multiple deputies and executive-level staffers resigned within the DCASE presenting and marketing divisions upon a mandate from Hedspeth that she be made the focal point of the department's PR efforts. DCASE's staffing issues first gained public attention with the firing of Chicago's Film Office director Jonah Zeigler by Hedspeth – a decision she took following a record-setting year for the city in film/TV production revenue and the acquisition of an inaugural satellite event in Chicago for the Sundance Film Festival, all achieved under Zeigler's leadership.

Reported controversies published by local media regarding Hedspeth's internal directives and staff interactions were compounded by a public outcry against the department presenting an exhibit accused of being antisemitic within their own office building at the Chicago Cultural Center. While Hedspeth refused to remove the artworks in question at the time, upon a formal complaint written to the mayor and a majority vote by city council, the exhibition was sunsetted two months before Hedspeth's resignation.

Hedspeth's behavior as DCASE commissioner – a role that traditionally was either presented positively or non-regarded by local press – found unusual public attention after a meeting of the city's Cultural Advisory Council (CAC) in February of 2025. A quarterly session open to the public, the event was widely attended by local cultural leaders and patrons in response to recent publications made about delayed grant payments unfulfilled by DCASE under Hedspeth's direction. After recorded public statements and council member requests for explanation, Hedspeth attended the meeting via teleconference, streaming from another room at the same building in which the meeting was held. Hedspeth noted a "hard stop" after three minutes of statements and took no questions before signing off. Regional reactions made light of the display online, as Hedspeth physically attended the following CAC meeting in June of 2025 although barring her own staffers from attending the public meeting and leaving before taking any questions.

== Harassment Allegations and Record Obstruction ==
The February 2025 CAC meeting that was electronically attended by Hedspeth took place just several days after a Chicago Sun-Times piece written by Elsa Hiltner recorded her and other reporters' experiences in attempting to find DCASE's information request log, protected to be publicly available under the Freedom of Information Act (United States).

"Every city department has a FOIA Request Log on the city’s website, where anyone can view public information about which official documents journalists, lawyers, or Chicagoans (like me) are requesting through FOIA. DCASE’s log is currently available only by filing a FOIA request, a hurdle that requires legal knowledge, days of waiting and navigating the department’s inconsistent application of FOIA’s exemptions. This means the log was hidden when Axios reporter Monica Eng submitted a request in December for “Any and all email or text correspondence from April 2024 to present between Lisa Lorick [DCASE’s Assistant Commissioner] and other DCASE staffers with the words ‘abuse’ ‘abused’ ‘Verbal abuse’ ‘toxic work environment’ ‘threatened’ ‘screamed at’ ‘performance improvement plan’ or ‘cursed at.’” I was only able to learn this information by filing a FOIA request for the log itself."

The department's FOIA log was made public again several days following this article.

Months-long investigations from regional and national press revealed several instances of reported bullying, harassment and sexual misconduct allegations against Hedspeth. The claims include Hedspeth asking a staffer whether they would have an affair with a married person if they gave them a financial allowance, telling a worker to "go back to India" and requesting an employee "put on a thick accent so it's hard to understand you" at a city council meeting, among others. At the time of her resignation, more than half of DCASE personnel including seven top deputies had left the department according to city records.

== Petition/Resignation ==
In April 2025, a second formal statement was made to local government against Hedspeth, this time in the form of a petition directed to mayor Brandon Johnson requesting transparency in regards to DCASE's delays in grant payments, staff turnover and apparent lack of communication with the city's cultural advisory committee. The public petition was organized by an Instagram account handled as @artistsforchicago and was signed by several hundred Chicago-based artists across various disciplines, local wards and stages in career.

Hedspeth resigned from her commissioner role at DCASE in September of 2025, 18 months from her initial appointment. Her resignation came reportedly before she could be terminated by the mayor's office and, in a statement to press from the mayor, was placed on the "ineligible for rehire" list for city employment. Chicago's cultural and tourism budget was reduced shortly after. The former Chicago employee told press in a statement that she's considering suing the city due to her treatment from Johnson's staff while employed.

== Personal ==
A self-described "professional culturalist", Hedspeth attended Dominican University in River Forest, Illinois. Hedspeth said she planned to return to the private sector and lead a foundation.
