= Brandon Johnson =

American politician and educator (born 1976)

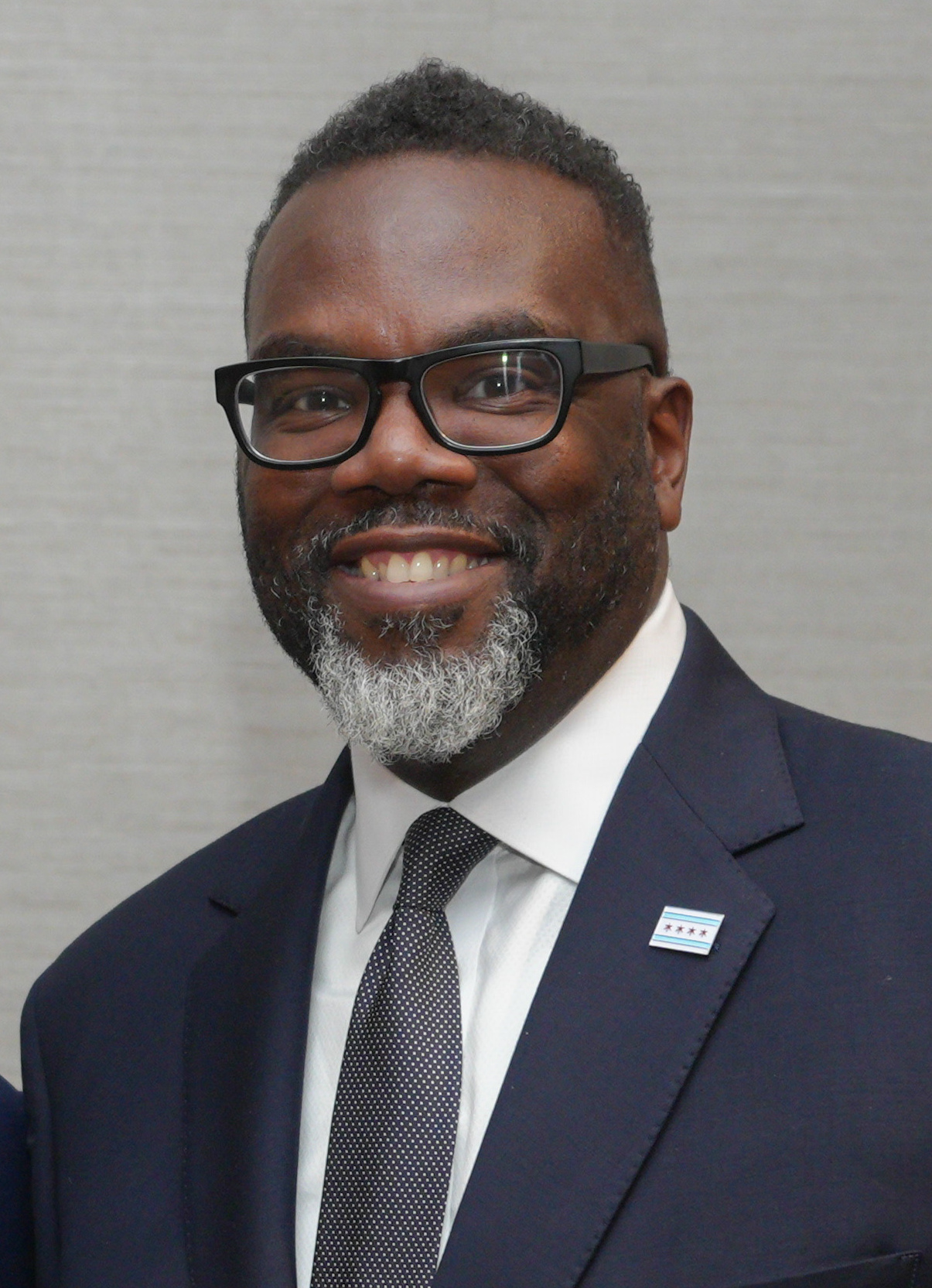
- Johnson in 2024

57th Mayor of Chicago
- Incumbent
- Assumed office May 15, 2023
- Deputy: Walter Burnett Jr. (2023–2025)
- Preceded by: Lori Lightfoot

Member of the Cook County Board of Commissioners from the 1st district
- In office December 3, 2018 – May 15, 2023
- Preceded by: Richard Boykin
- Succeeded by: Tara Stamps

Personal details
- Born: March 27, 1976 (age 50) Elgin, Illinois, U.S.
- Party: Democratic
- Spouse: Stacie Rencher (m. 1998)
- Children: 3
- Education: Aurora University (BA, MA)

Brandon Johnson (born March 27, 1976) is an American politician and former educator who since 2023 has served as the 57th mayor of Chicago. A member of the Democratic Party, Johnson previously served on the Cook County Board of Commissioners from 2018 to 2023, representing the 1st district.

Born and raised in Elgin, Illinois, Johnson started his career as a social studies teacher in the Chicago Public Schools system. He also was an active member of the Chicago Teachers Union, helping organize their 2012 strike. In his first race for public office, Johnson was elected to the Cook County Board of Commissioners in 2018, defeating the incumbent. Johnson represented parts of Chicago's West Side and some of the city's western suburbs. He won reelection in 2022.

Johnson ran successfully for mayor of Chicago in 2023. In the first round of the election, he and Paul Vallas advanced to a runoff, unseating incumbent mayor Lori Lightfoot. Johnson subsequently defeated Vallas in the runoff election.

Throughout his political career, Johnson has been described as a political progressive. As mayor, Johnson has focused on combating homelessness and enacting police and education reform, however he has faced low approval numbers throughout his term. He is running for re-election in 2027.

== Early life and education ==
Johnson was born in Elgin, Illinois. He was one of ten children born to Andrew and Wilma Jean Johnson. Johnson grew up in Elgin. His father was a pastor and his parents were occasional foster parents. Johnson's father, Andrew Johnson, also worked at the Elgin Mental Health Center. Johnson attended Elgin High School where he played baseball and was an all-conference defensive lineman in football.

When Johnson was nineteen years old, his mother died of congestive heart failure. Johnson met his wife, Stacie Rencher, at a religious convention. They married when Johnson was 22 years old.

Johnson earned a bachelor's degree in youth development in 2004 and a master's degree in teaching in 2007, both from Aurora University in Aurora, Illinois.

== Early career ==
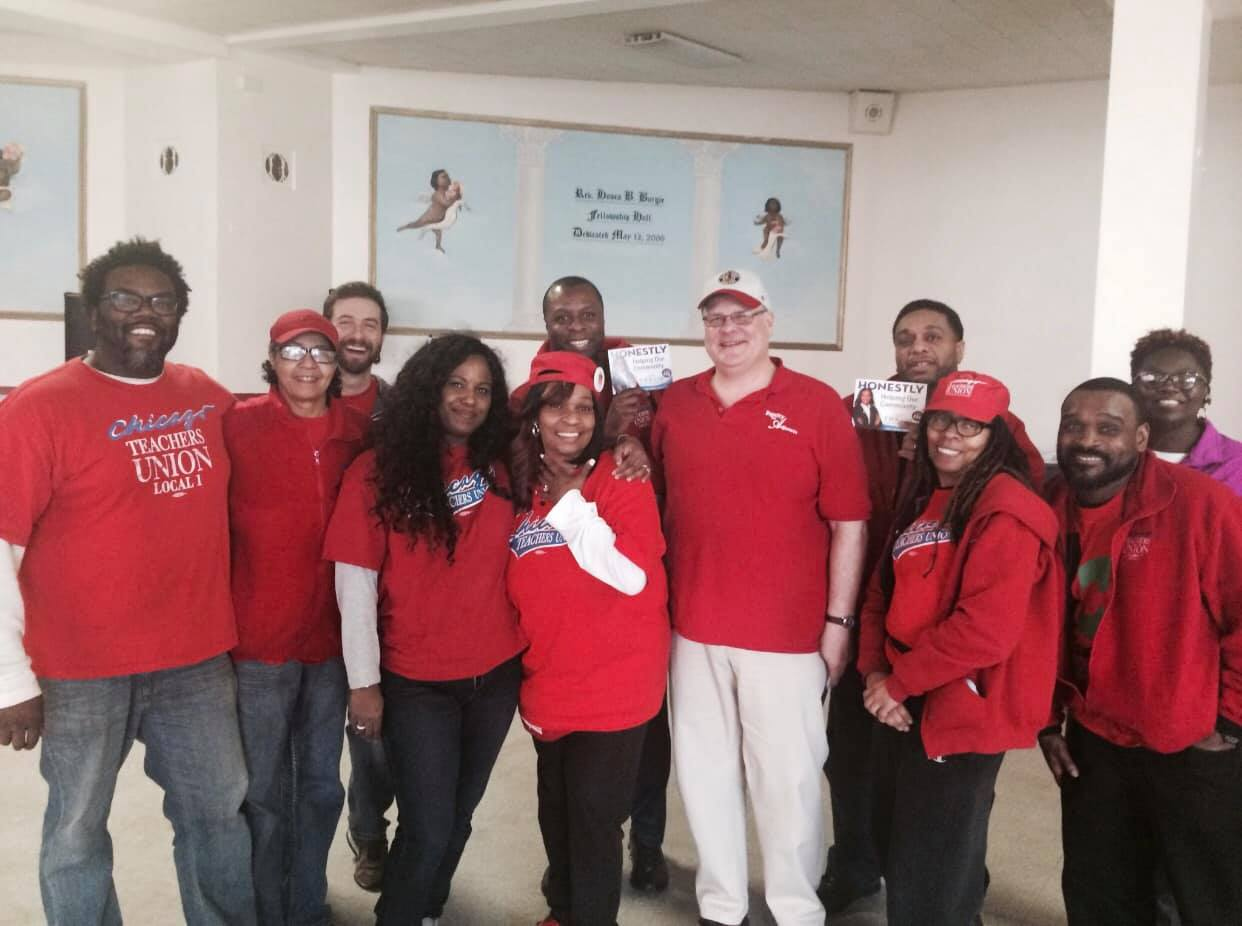
Johnson (furthest left) during the 2019 Chicago Public Schools strike

Johnson worked as a social studies teacher at Jenner Academy Elementary from 2007 to 2010, a public school near the Cabrini-Green housing development on Chicago's Near North Side. Johnson then taught at George Westinghouse College Prep high school in the East Garfield Park neighborhood for less than one year, before becoming a full-time organizer. Both are part of the Chicago Public Schools system.

Johnson became an organizer with the Chicago Teachers Union in 2011, and helped organize the 2012 Chicago teachers strike. He also helped lead field campaigns during the 2015 Chicago mayoral and aldermanic elections.

Johnson and his family live in the Austin neighborhood on the West Side of Chicago.

== Cook County commissioner (2018–2023) ==
Johnson ran against incumbent Richard Boykin in the 2018 election for the Cook County Board of Commissioner's 1st district. He was endorsed by a number of labor organizations and progressive advocacy groups, including the Chicago Teachers Union, Grassroots Illinois Action, The People's Lobby, Our Revolution, and SEIU Locals 1 and 73. He was also endorsed by Cook County Board of Commissioners President Toni Preckwinkle. He won the Democratic Party primary election on March 20, 2018, defeating Boykin by 0.8 percentage points (437 votes), and ran unopposed in the general election on November 6, 2018. Johnson was sworn in as a Cook County commissioner on December 3, 2018.

Johnson was the chief sponsor of the Just Housing Ordinance, which amended the county's housing ordinance by prohibiting potential landlords or property owners from asking about or considering prospective tenants' or homebuyers' criminal history. The ordinance was passed in April 2019.

In October 2019, Johnson spoke at a solidarity rally supporting striking teachers and support staff during the 2019 Chicago Public Schools Strike, and wrote supportive letters to the editor in the Chicago Tribune and Chicago Sun-Times. Johnson worked as a paid organizer for CTU, focusing on legislative affairs. Politico's Illinois Playbook reported after the strike that Johnson was rumored as a potential mayoral candidate in the 2023 election; Johnson responded by calling the rumors "laughable" and criticizing the publication for making a connection between the strike and his electoral career. In November 2019, Johnson wrote an essay in a CTU publication drawing a distinction between the union's organizing model and "top-down school governance."

Johnson endorsed Toni Preckwinkle ahead of the first round of the 2019 Chicago mayoral election. He also endorsed Melissa Conyears-Ervin in the 2019 Chicago city treasurer election. In August 2019, Johnson endorsed the candidacy of Elizabeth Warren in the 2020 Democratic Party presidential primaries.

In the summer of 2020, amid the George Floyd protests, Johnson authored the "Justice for Black Lives" resolution that was adopted in July 2020. The resolution called for reallocating funding "from policing and incarceration" to "public services not administered by law enforcement that promote community health and safety equitably." In an interview that year, Johnson praised the political catchphrase "defund the police" as a "real political goal". He would later walk back his embrace of the phrase "defund the police", especially making an effort to disassociate himself from it during his 2023 mayoral campaign.

Johnson was reelected in 2022.

During Johnson's tenure on the Board of Commissioners, Board President Toni Preckwinkle exerted strong influence on the policy pursued by the body. Johnson had generally been allied with Preckwinkle.

== 2023 mayoral campaign ==
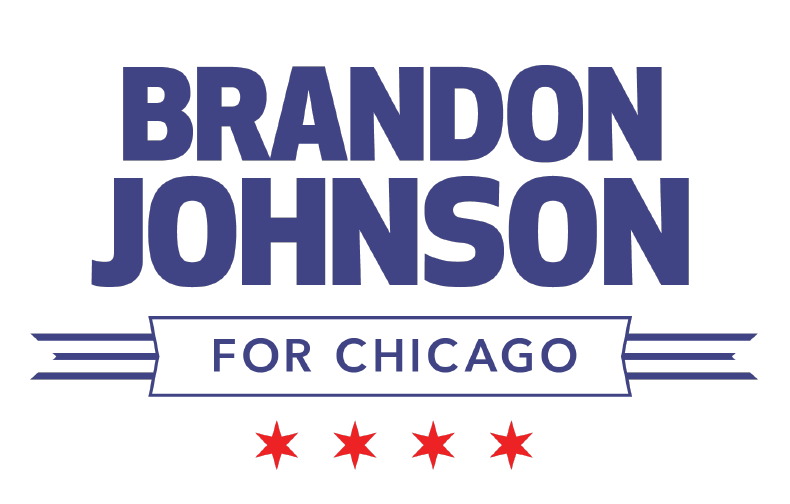
Johnson's mayoral campaign logo

Johnson was elected the mayor of Chicago in the city's 2023 mayoral election. He became the third black person to be elected mayor of Chicago and the first mayor to hail from the city's West Side since the 1930s. Johnson was sworn in as Chicago's 57th mayor on May 15, 2023.

=== First round ===
On September 13, 2022, Johnson launched an exploratory committee to consider running for in the 2023 mayoral election. In the weeks that followed, he received endorsements from United Working Families, the Chicago Teachers Union, and progressive independent political organizations in the 30th, 33rd, 35th, and 39th wards. On October 23, the American Federation of Teachers pledged to donate $1 million to Johnson's campaign should he enter the race. On October 27, Johnson formally announced his candidacy at Seward Park.

Johnson's campaign was supported by what Heather Cherone of WTTW News described as a "coalition of progressive groups". Johnson was the beneficiary of Chuy García's decision to wait until after the 2022 United States House of Representatives election to announce his mayoral candidacy, as a number of groups that had supported García 2015 mayoral campaign, such as the Chicago Teachers Union and the United Working Families, grew impatient of waiting for a decision by García on whether he would run and instead pledged their support to Johnson.

Johnson was described as a "progressive" and a favored "candidate of the left." His campaign emphasized funding and resources for public schools, a public safety platform that includes efficiency audits and non-police responses to mental health emergencies, support for a real estate transfer tax to fund homelessness response and prevention, and a budget that proposes raising $1 billion in new revenues, including through new or increased taxes on airlines, financial transactions, high-value real estate transfers, and hotels. Amid polling showing crime and police relations as the leading issue, Johnson was the only primary candidate who did not express support for hiring more police officers, suggesting instead an increase in the detective force from existing ranks, citywide youth hiring, reopening mental health centers, and investment in violence prevention as means to address 'root causes of crime', in line with voter preferences for increased job training and economic opportunity over force expansion.

In the first round of the election on February 28, Johnson placed second with about 22% of the vote. He advanced to the runoff election on April 4, where he faced Paul Vallas, who placed first in the initial round with over 33% of the vote.

=== Runoff ===
After they were eliminated in the election's first round as mayoral candidates, U.S. Congressman Chuy García and Illinois State Representative Kam Buckner endorsed Johnson in the runoff. Among the most prominent figures to endorse Johnson in the general election were activist and two-time presidential candidate Jesse Jackson, Cook County Board of Commissioners President Toni Preckwinkle (the runner-up of the previous mayoral election in 2019), Illinois Attorney General Kwame Raoul, former U.S. Senator Carol Moseley Braun (a 2004 presidential candidate 2011 mayoral candidate), U.S. Congressman from South Carolina Jim Clyburn, as well as U.S. Senators and former presidential candidates Elizabeth Warren (of Massachusetts) and Bernie Sanders (of Vermont).

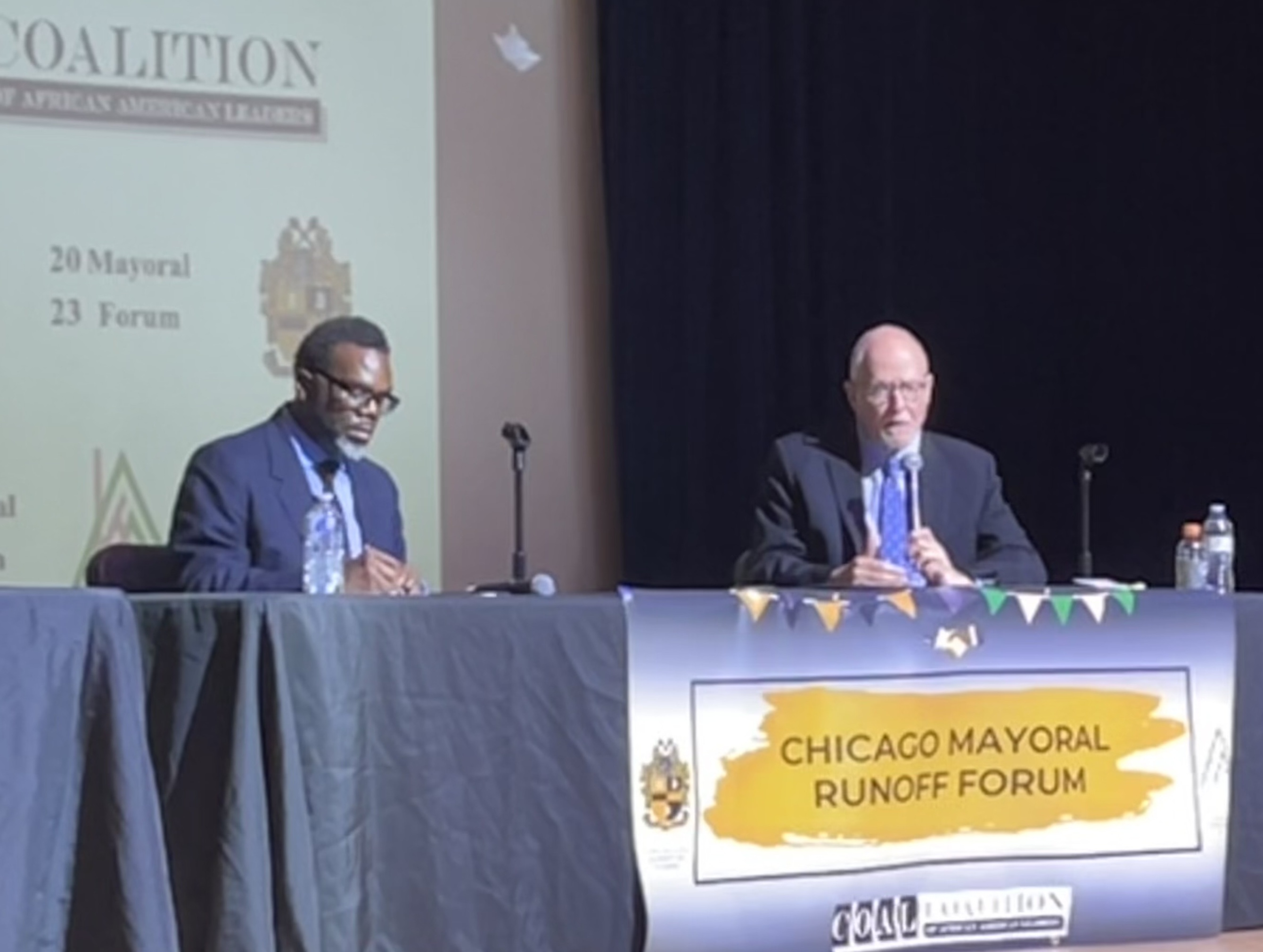
Johnson alongside Paul Vallas at a runoff mayoral forum at Kenwood Academy, March 2023

Johnson criticized Vallas for ties to Republican Party organizations and figures, as well as his ties to conservative causes. In the first runoff debate, Johnson remarked, "Chicago cannot afford Republicans like Paul Vallas". In response, Vallas proclaimed himself a "lifelong Democrat", citing his candidacy in the primary of the 2002 Illinois gubernatorial election and his unsuccessful campaign as the Democratic Party's nominee for lieutenant governor in the 2014 Illinois gubernatorial election. Johnson also attacked Vallas as having hurt Chicago Public Schools' finances during his tenure as CEO of Chicago Public Schools. Vallas accused Johnson of lacking "substance", accusing him of lacking a significant political record. Vallas campaigned on lowering crime while characterizing Johnson as wanting to "defund the police".

On April 4, Johnson defeated Vallas to win the runoff election. His victory was described as an upset victory by several media outlets.

Johnson was significantly out-fundraised by Vallas, and outspent by a ratio of nearly 2-to-1. Some journalists have attributed grassroots organizing in support of Johnson's candidacy as having been the difference-maker in his victory.

== Mayor of Chicago (2023–present) ==
=== Transition and inauguration ===
Many who led Johnson's transition team, including its chair, had ties to trade unions.

On April 6, 2023, Mayor-elect Johnson met with Mayor Lightfoot at her Chicago City Hall office in order to discuss the mayoral transition. The following day, Mayor-elect Johnson met in person with Illinois governor J. B. Pritzker. He met in person with Illinois attorney general Kwame Raoul on April 14, 2023.

On April 11, 2023, Chicago was announced to have won the right to host the 2024 Democratic National Convention. Johnson had supported the city's bid. After defeating Lightfoot in the first round, both Johnson and Vallas vowed to support the convention bid that Lightfoot had been championing as mayor. It was reported that when President Joe Biden made a congratulatory phone call to Johnson after he was projected the election's victory, Johnson took the opportunity to pitch him on Chicago's bid to host the convention. After the mayoral election, in the final day before the Democratic National Committee was to select a host city for the convention, Johnson and Governor Pritzker had worked with each other to advance the case for Chicago to host.

Approximately a week after his election, Johnson joined a picket line alongside striking faculty members at Chicago State University.

In April 2023, after several large groups of teens and young adults engaged in shootings and vandalism across multiple locations in the city, Mayor-Elect Johnson issued a statement, writing, "in no way do I condone the destructive activity we saw in the Loop and lakefront this weekend. It is unacceptable and has no place in our city. However, it is not constructive to demonize youth who have otherwise been starved of opportunities in their own communities."

On April 18, Johnson began a trip to the state capital of Springfield, Illinois, holding meetings there with state lawmakers. The following day, he addressed the Illinois General Assembly.

Johnson made staff decisions during the transition period, such as selecting his mayoral chief of staff. It was announced that Interim Chief of Police Eric Carter would step down from that position on the day that Johnson is inaugurated.

Johnson was inaugurated at noon on May 15, 2023, at the Credit Union 1 Arena. Hours later he signed four executive orders relating to public safety, migrants and youth employment.

=== "One Fair Wage" ===
In October 2023, the City Council passed the "One Fair Wage" ordinance with the support of Johnson. The ordinance establishes a timeline for the eventual elimination of the subminimum wage for tipped workers by July 1, 2028.

=== Housing and "Bring Chicago Home" ===
As Mayor, Johnson has sought to remove red tape to streamline housing and commercial development in the city.

During the 2023 mayoral campaign, Johnson campaigned on passing the "Bring Chicago Home" ordinance, a plan to increase the city's real estate transfer tax (RETT) on property sales over $1 million to fund affordable housing and homelessness support services. In November 2023, City Council voted to put a referendum to change the tax on the primary election ballot in March 2024. The referendum failed, with 53.2% of voters opposing the measure.

In 2024, Johnson pushed for a 615-unit apartment building (of which 124 units were affordable housing) on the lot of a former industrial site at 1840 North Marcey Street. The alderman in the district, Scott Waguespack, sought to use his aldermanic privilege to block the housing development, but Johnson pushed to streamline the project and not allow Waguespack to delay or block it.

In February 2025, Johnson introduced the Green Social Housing ordinance. The ordinance creates a city-run nonprofit run by the Department of Housing that finances private construction of mixed-income housing through low interest loans. Each new construction will have at least 30 percent affordable housing. After construction, the city retains a majority ownership stake and rent payments go into the funding of new developments. The buildings must also meet green sustainability standards designed to decrease carbon emissions, save on energy bills, and improve indoor air quality. In May, City Council approved the ordinance.

=== Chicago Public Schools ===
In July 2023, Johnson appointed new members to the Chicago Board of Education, including appointing Jianan Shi as board president.

In 2024, the city of Chicago was engaged in contract negotiations with the Chicago Teachers Union (Johnson's former employer). In July 2024, Johnson began suggesting that the school district should take on a new loan in order to cover expenses required to meet the teachers union's demands related to the funding of pensions and contracts. However, higher-ups within the school district, as well as the school board, took issue, expressing concern over the prospect of taking on additional debt obligation considering its existing debts.

Amid a standstill, the teachers union publicly lambasted Chicago Public Schools CEO Pedro Martinez, blaming him and pejoratively labeling him a "Lightfoot holdover". Johnson also privately requested Martinez's resignation (though he publicly denied having done so). On September 24, the Chicago Tribune published an op-ed by Martinez, in which he outlined his reasons for refusing Johnson's request for him to resign.

With all of this occurring before a period of change for the board (with the 2024 board election set to reshape its composition from an entirely-appointed board to a hybrid board), the incumbent board members all declined to dismiss Martinez. Ultimately, this conflict led the board (including board president Jianan Shi) to tender their own resignations in early October. 41 out of the 50 members of the Chicago City Council (including some of Johnson's key council allies) signed an open letter criticizing Johnson's move to quickly reshape the board only weeks before the school board election. Days later, Johnson named new appointees to six of the seven seats Seven new appointed members and president were sworn in together on October 28.

In his shakeup of the board, Johnson appointed Rev. Mitchell Ikenna Johnson as the new board president. After he was appointed, controversy arose over numerous social media posts he had previously made. Soon after he was appointed, attention was brought to a social media post he had made heralding the October 7 attacks as "resistance against oppression"; forty members of the city council and governor JB Pritzker expressed concern, with the governor accusing Mayor Johnson and his administration of failing to properly vet him. Rev. Johnson later offered an apology for the offending post. The mayor initially defended his school board president, remarking:

He recognizes the harm those statements have caused, and has expressed his apology and will continue to seek atonement to have the full confidence in every community in the city of Chicago.

Additional controversial social media posts came to light on October 31, including a misogynistic meme and a post asserting a 9/11 conspiracy theory. Governor Pritzker issued a public statement calling for Rev. Johnson's resignation. Journalists also uncovered many anti-Israel and pro-Palestinian posts on his social media accounts that used hostile and offensive rhetoric towards Jewish people. Later that day, Rev. Johnson tendered his resignation as school board president, with the mayor releasing a statement that the board president's resignation had come at the mayor's request due to his past online statements which were "not only hurtful but deeply disturbing." On December 11, Mayor Johnson appointed Sean Harden as board president. On December 20, Johnson's new appointees to the school board unanimously voted to terminate Martinez from his position as CEO.

=== Blocked economic efforts ===
In mid November 2024 Johnson proposed a $300 million property tax increase to balance the city's budget that was unanimously rejected by the city council, 50–0. Johnson later stated that the proposed increase wasn't serious but just to get people's attention. In March of that year voters also rejected an increase to the real-estate transfer tax on properties valued at more than $1 million and his plan to use a loan to fund contract demands from the Chicago Teachers Union led to mass resignations of the Chicago school board. The conservative The Wall Street Journal editorial board denounced Johnson's economic reforms as putting Chicago "on a progressive kamikaze course."

=== Influence of senior advisor Jason Lee ===
In 2024–2025, the Chicago Sun-Times reported that Johnson's senior advisor Jason Lee held considerable influence over Johnson's policymaking; the Sun-Times referred to Lee as Chicago's "shadow mayor." Lee is the son of late Texas congresswoman Sheila Jackson-Lee, and he maintains an official residence in Houston despite living in Chicago, voting as a Texas resident in 2024. In October 2025, Johnson would decline to fire Lee, despite being recommended by the city Inspector General Deborah Witzburg to do so. In January 2026, Johnson would again defend Lee, despite Lee's controversial decision to work out-of-state on Texas-based Congresswoman Jasmine Crockett's U.S. Senate campaign, even describing Lee's role with the campaign as vital to his own Chicago agenda.

=== Other matters ===
In late November 2023, Johnson acknowledged that the City of Chicago, with the backing of Illinois governor JB Pritzker, was set to construct a tent city hosting mostly Venezuelan migrants on the Southwest Side. Along with the encampments, Johnson teamed up with churches in 17 of Chicago's parishes to house roughly 350 migrants.

In January 2024, Johnson cast a tiebreaking vote in support of a resolution calling for a permanent ceasefire in the Gaza war.

In February 2024, Johnson, as Mayor of Chicago, announced lawsuits against major oil and gas companies including BP, Chevron, ConocoPhillips, ExxonMobil, Phillips 66, Shell, and the American Petroleum Institute, accusing them of deceiving the public about the climate change impacts of their products, as the city of Chicago seeks accountability for climate change-related damages it has suffered.

In March 2024, Johnson appointed college friend Clinée Hedspeth to lead the city's art and cultural department, a decision marked with controversy over a short period of time that included bullying, anti-Semitic and sexual harassment allegations among others. Hedspeth resigned less than 18 months since her appointment and was placed on the "ineligible for rehire" list for city employment.

In October 2024, an Orthodox Jewish man was shot as he walked to his synagogue in the historically Jewish West Rogers Park neighborhood of Chicago. Local Jewish activists and community groups condemned Johnson for neglecting to acknowledge the shooting victim's Jewish identity in his initial statement. U.S. Representative Ritchie Torres of New York City criticized Johnson, implying that the mayor should resign if unwilling to take action against blatant antisemitism in the city. In November, the Chicago Police Department announced the alleged shooter would face hate crime and terrorism charges.

=== Approval ratings ===
On June 16, 2025, a poll was published that showed 26% approved of his job, 38% disapproved, and 36% expressed "mixed views", for a net approval of −12. This represented an improvement in net approval rating of 44 points from the October 2024 poll. An October 2025 poll by a Democratic polling firm put his approval at 31%, with 61% disapproving.

During the early months of 2026 and at the start of the 2027 mayoral election cycle, Johnson continued to face low approval ratings, with a Suffolk-Tribune poll indicating that while 30% of residents find the city an excellent place to live, a significant portion held unfavorable views of his leadership. His approval rating were in the mid-20s to low-30s throughout late 2025 and early 2026, failing to reach the 50% benchmark often necessary for re-election. His low approval ratings were noted by The New York Times and The Wall Street Journal with the latter's conservative editorial board calling Johnson "America's Worst Mayor".

=== 2027 mayoral campaign ===
As of August 2026, Johnson had not announced his re-election campaign. In April 2026, it was reported that Johnson had only raised $813,000 for his re-election bid while Illinois Secretary of State Alexi Giannoulias had raised $18.3 million through his political action committee. A poll conducted in July 2026, found that only 14% of Chicagoans wanted Johnson to run for re-election. It was noted by local media and commentators about Johnson’s lack of a re-election campaign announcement while other prominent Democratic figures such as U.S. Representative Mike Quigley, Cook County Treasurer Maria Pappas, Illinois Comptroller Susana Mendoza and Alexi Giannoulias had already announced their candidacies challenging Johnson.

In an interview in late July 2026, Johnson said he was in no rush to announce a re-election campaign while also defending his record and agenda. In an article by The New York Times the following month, it was noted that Johnson faced a difficult path to re-election due to eroding support, the city’s financial issues, growing disapproval ratings and lackluster fundraising to a potential re-election bid. On September 13, Johnson formally announced his re-election campaign.

== Personal life ==
Johnson lives in the Austin neighborhood on the West Side of Chicago with his wife, Stacie, and their three children.

In March 2023, it was revealed that Johnson owed the city of Chicago $3,357.04 in unpaid water and sewer charges and additional $1,144.58 in unpaid traffic tickets from 2014 and 2015. However, Johnson's debts were confirmed to be paid in full by March 31, 2023.

== Electoral history ==
=== Cook County Board of Commissioners ===
==== 2018 ====
Cook County Board of Commissioners 1st district Democratic primary
Party	Candidate	Votes	%
Democratic	Brandon Johnson	24,863	50.44
Democratic	Richard Boykin (incumbent)	24,426	49.56
Total votes		49,289	100.00

Cook County Board of Commissioners 1st district election
Party	Candidate	Votes	%
Democratic	Brandon Johnson	88,590	100.00
Total votes		88,590	100.00

==== 2022 ====
2022 Cook County Board of Commissioners 1st district Democratic primary
Party	Candidate	Votes	%
Democratic	Brandon Johnson (incumbent)	30,702	100.00
Total votes		30,702	100.00

2022 Cook County Board of Commissioners 1st district election
Party	Candidate	Votes	%
Democratic	Brandon Johnson (incumbent)	71,077	92.87
Libertarian	James Humay	5,457	7.13
Total votes		76,534	100.00

=== Mayor of Chicago ===
2023 Chicago mayoral election
Candidate	General election		Runoff election	
Candidate	Votes	%	Votes	%
Brandon Johnson	122,093	21.63	319,481	52.16
Paul Vallas	185,743	32.90	293,033	47.84
Lori Lightfoot (incumbent)	94,890	16.81		
Chuy García	77,222	13.68		
Willie Wilson	51,567	9.13		
Ja'Mal Green	12,257	2.17		
Kam Buckner	11,092	1.96		
Sophia King	7,191	1.27		
Roderick Sawyer	2,440	0.43		
Write-ins	29	0.00		
Total	564,524	100.00	612,514	100.00

Political offices
Preceded by Lori Lightfoot	Mayor of Chicago; 2023–present	Incumbent
