= Bring Chicago Home =

2024 Chicago tax referendum for homelessness prevention services

Ballot Question 1
- March 19, 2024
- "Amending the Real Estate Transfer Tax"
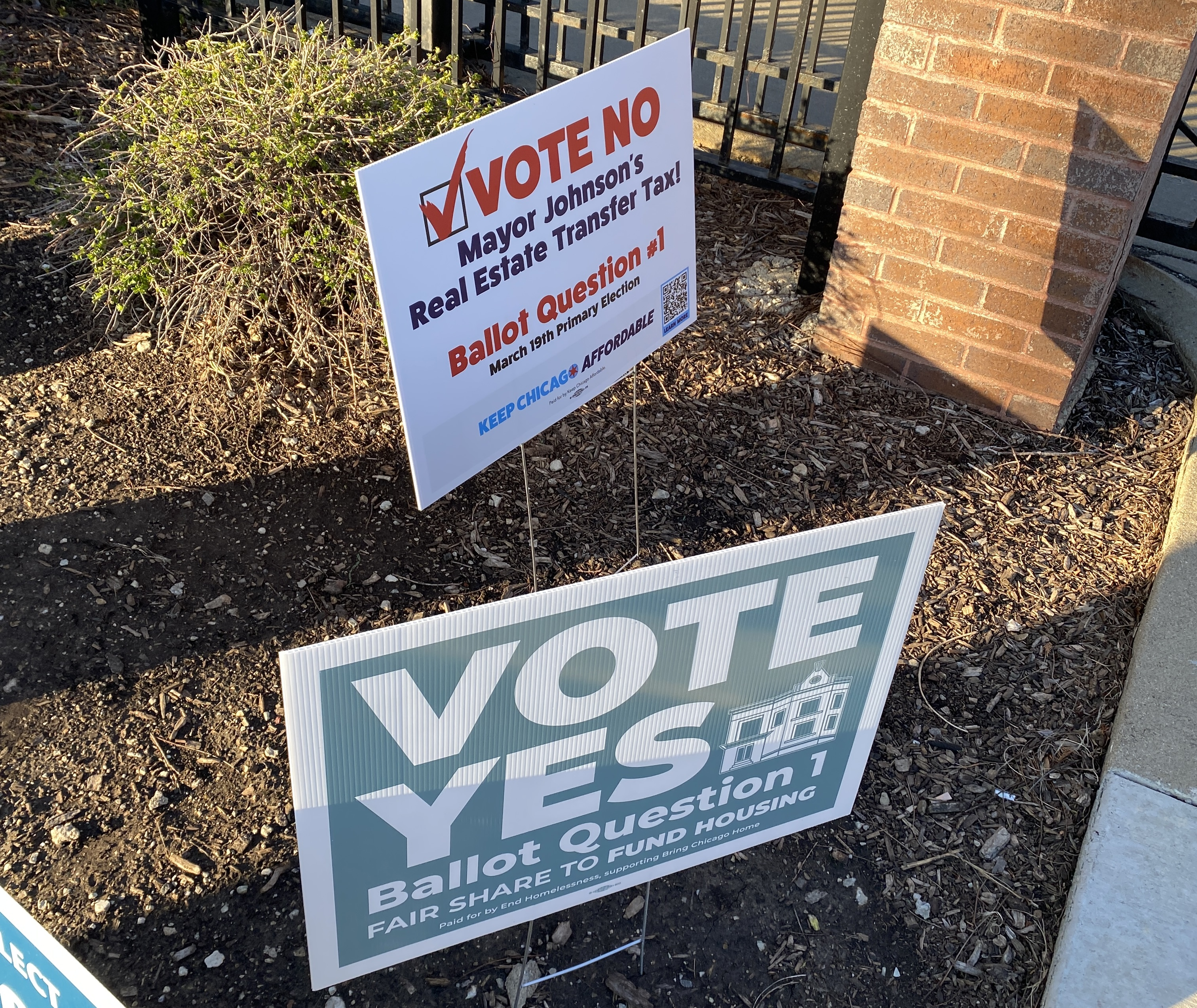
- Polling place campaign signs in support and opposition of Bring Chicago Home

Results
Choice	Votes	%
Yes	169,492	47.83%
No	184,890	52.17%
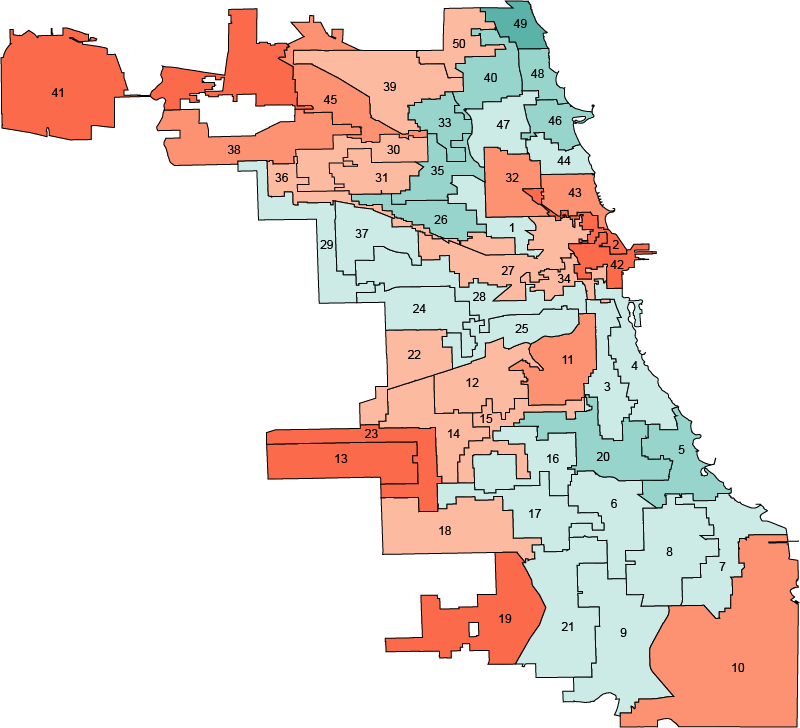
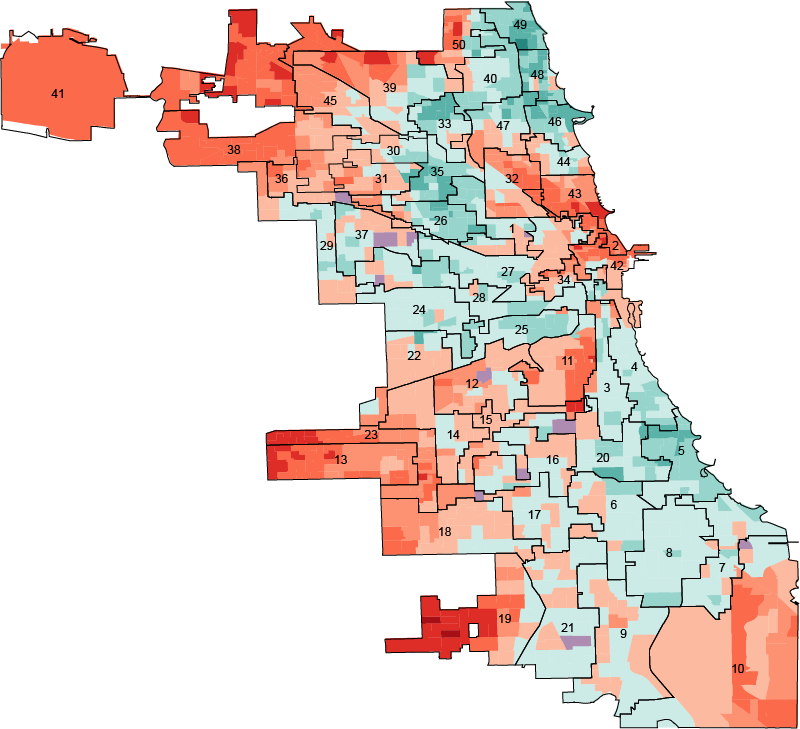
- Yes 50.00-59.99% Yes 60.00-69.99% Yes 70.00-79.99% Yes 80.00-89.99% Yes 90.00-99.99% No 50.00-59.99% No 60.00-69.99% No 70.00-79.99% No 80.00-89.99% No 90.00-99.99% Tie

Bring Chicago Home, officially known as Ballot Question 1, is a tax referendum that was defeated during the 2024 primary election in Chicago. Labeled as a "mansion tax" by both supporters and opponents, the measure, if passed, would have amended the Chicago real estate transfer tax, changing it from a flat tax to a progressive tax, lowering the tax for property sales under a $1 million and raising the tax on the value of property sales over $1 million and $1.5 million respectively. The revenue generated would have established a fund with the purpose of addressing homelessness by providing permanent affordable housing and support services designed to help unhoused individuals find and maintain stable housing. The election was held on March 19, 2024, and the referendum was not approved, with 52.17% voting "No."

== Text ==
To the Voters of the City Of Chicago:

Amending the Real Estate Transfer Tax

"Shall the City of Chicago impose: 1) a real estate transfer tax decrease of 20% to establish a new transfer tax rate of $3 for every $500 of the transfer price, or fraction thereof, for that part of the transfer price under $1,000,000 to be paid by the buyer of the real estate transferred unless the buyer is exempt from the tax solely by operation of state law, in which case the tax is to be paid by the seller; AND (2) a real estate transfer tax increase of 166.67% to establish a new transfer tax rate of $10 for every $500 of the transfer price or fraction thereof, for that part of the transfer price between $1,000,000 and $1,500,000 (inclusive) to be paid by the buyer of the real estate transferred unless the buyer is exempt from the tax solely by operation of state law, in which case the tax is to be paid by the seller; AND (3) a real estate transfer tax increase of 300% to establish a new transfer tax rate of $15 for every $500 of the transfer price, or fraction thereof, for that part of the transfer price exceeding $1,500,000 to be paid by the buyer of the real estate transferred unless the buyer is exempt from the tax solely by operation of state law, in which case the tax is to be paid by the seller? The current rate of the real estate transfer tax is $3.75 per $500 of the entire transfer price, or fraction thereof, and the revenue is used for general corporate purposes. The revenue from the increase (the difference between revenue generated under the increased rate and the current rate) is to be used for the purpose of addressing homelessness, including providing permanent affordable housing and the services necessary to obtain and maintain permanent housing in the City of Chicago."

With vote options of "Yes" or "No".

== Background ==
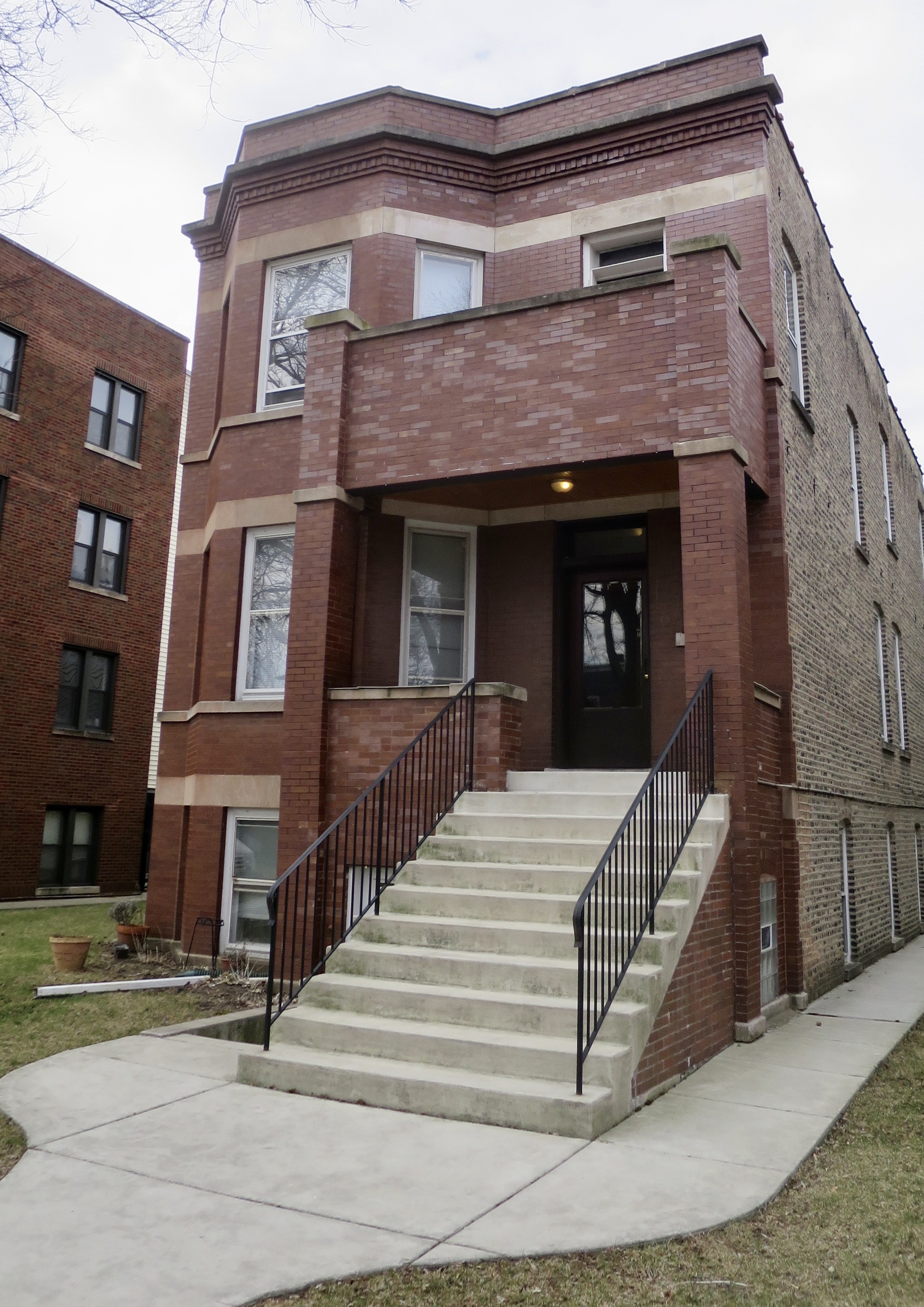
A two-flat apartment building, common in Chicago.

Illinois state law allows for Chicago's real estate transfer tax to be modified through either a referendum question brought directly to voters or through an amendment to the law by the Illinois General Assembly.

In October 2018, the Bring Chicago Home campaign was announced, led by the Chicago Coalition for the Homeless (CCH) and sponsored by Alderman Walter Burnett. The campaign advocated for a 160 percent increase to Chicago's real estate transfer tax on property sales over $1 million for the purpose of combating homelessness through affordable housing and support services to be included via referendum in the 2019 Chicago elections. CCH estimated the original proposal would generate $150 million annually. Mayor Rahm Emanuel announced his opposition to the plan, stating that Chicago homeowners are "not an ATM machine." Emanuel remained opposed to Bring Chicago Home, stalling the referendum from being included in either the 2019 City Council Election or 2020 general election.

During the 2019 Chicago mayoral runoff election both candidates, Toni Preckwinkle and Lori Lightfoot, endorsed Bring Chicago Home. Shortly into Lightfoot's mayoralty, she signaled she would ask the Illinois General Assembly to change the real estate transfer tax, instead of bringing the referendum to voters. Senate President John Cullerton and House Majority Leader Greg Harris both expressed doubts it could be passed.

In June 2022, Crain's Chicago Business reported real estate groups such as the Chicago Association of Realtors and the Building Owners & Managers Association in Chicago had remained silent on the campaign but would mobilize opposition when the City Council picked it back up. In November 2022, there was a renewed push from Alderpersons Maria Hadden and Matt Martin to place Bring Chicago Home on the ballot in the 2023 Chicago election. The plan was stopped when Lightfoot and her council allies protested the vote, preventing a quorum.

The 2023 Chicago mayoral election marked a turning point in the Bring Chicago Home campaign when Cook County Commissioner Brandon Johnson won in the runoff against former Chicago Public Schools CEO Paul Vallas. The Bring Chicago Home ordinance was a central pillar of Johnson's campaign platform.

In August 2023, a compromise on the proposal, negotiated by Mayor Johnson's floor leader and Zoning Committee Chair, Alderman Carlos Ramirez-Rosa, modified the original proposal to triple the transfer tax on properties sold for over $1 million, and changed it to a self-described “three-tiered progressive structure.” The updated proposal cut the tax of sales under $1 million from 0.75% to 0.60%, increased the tax on the value between $1 million and $1.5 million to 2%, and the value greater than $1.5 million to 3%. The changes in the proposal were made to minimize opposition from those concerned that smaller apartment buildings would bear the brunt of the tax increase. Representatives from the Building Owners and Managers Association, the Neighborhood Building Owners Alliance, and other real estate groups expressed opposition to the plan naming that it would lead to landlords increasing rents and further damage the return to in-person work following the COVID-19 pandemic in Chicago. The updated proposal was estimated to generate $100 million in revenue annually.

Bring Chicago Home City Council vote on 11–7–23, by ward. Yea Nay Not Voting

In November 2023, a vote to include the Bring Chicago Home referendum in the March 19, 2024 primary election passed in the Chicago City Council by a 32–17 vote.

If Bring Chicago Home were to pass, it would have been first time that Chicago voters had approved a binding referendum since 1885.

== Campaign ==
The campaign for Bring Chicago Home was characterized by grassroots organizers, homeless prevention advocates, and unhoused people themselves in support of the measure and real estate organizations and commercial property owners in opposition of the proposal.

=== Support ===
Supporters primarily campaigned through a city-wide canvassing campaign and digital advertisements. Proponents argued that Chicago lacked a dedicated funding stream for homelessness prevention services and that the change of the real estate transfer tax would generate upwards of $100 million in tax revenue. Supporters viewed addressing homelessness in Chicago as urgent, citing over 68,000 homeless residents in the city, with more than 20,000 students in Chicago Public Schools facing housing instability.

Due to the progressive tax structure of the proposed change, 93% of all property sales would fall below the $1 million threshold and see a tax cut, placing the tax burden on commercial properties and large apartment buildings.

A political action committee called "End Homelessness, supporting Bring Chicago Home" received over $1.9 million of contributions, from organizations including the Chicago Teachers Union,the Michael Reese Health Trust, and SEIU Healthcare Illinois Indiana in support of the campaign.

=== Opposition ===
Opponents utilized mailers and other forms of advertisements to oppose the proposition. Opponents argued that the volatility of revenue from the real estate transfer tax would make the measure ineffective at addressing homelessness prevention. Additionally, Bring Chicago Home was criticized for vague ballot language and unclear plans from the Johnson administration on how the generated funds would be spent. Real estate developers viewed increasing the tax as a risk to housing supply by deterring new construction. Landlords argued the tax change would lead to higher rents.

Real estate organizations contributed to political action committees "Chicago Forward" and "Keep Chicago Affordable", raising more than $1.5 million to oppose the referendum.

==== Legal challenge ====
In January 2024, a lawsuit was filed by real estate groups in the Cook County Circuit Court alleging that the ballot language establishing a progressive tax structure violated the Illinois Constitution and state law. In February, Circuit Court Judge Kathleen Burke ruled Bring Chicago Home invalid, this occurred during the early voting period, leading the question to remain on the ballot but votes not being counted. The City appealed to the Illinois Appellate Court where Judge Raymond Mitchell reversed the lower court judgment. The real estate groups appealed the judgment to the Illinois Supreme Court, which rejected the effort, allowing the referendum to remain on the ballot and votes to be counted.

== Results ==
The referendum failed with final results of the election on March 19, 2024, showing 52.17% voting "No." Conservative wards on the Northwest and Southwest side of city voted strongly against the measure, while lakefront liberals voted in favor of it.

Analysis from WBEZ reported that most home-owner heavy precincts voted against the measure, while renter heavy precincts were split, 45% voting against and 55% voting in favor. Additionally, results showed a decline in support for the measure in precincts that voted in favor of Johnson in the April 2023 mayoral runoff election. Only 23% of registered voters participated in the referendum, with the strongest turnout in precincts that opposed the question.

== Reactions ==
Supporters of Bring Chicago Home viewed the rejection of the measure as a result of misinformation from the real estate lobby, Alderwoman Maria Hadden stating in an interview with ABC7 Chicago, "I think that the millions and millions of dollars that real estate lobby opponents put into this brought a lot of misinformation really struck at people financial concerns." Opponents cited voters having a lack of faith in the administration to handle the responsibly, Alderman Brendan Reilly also stating to ABC7 Chicago, "voters aren't really ready to trust to this administration with more money until they see some kind of progress on the pressing issues that we're all confronting every day here."

Confusion over the legal challenge was also cited by supporters as a reason for the referendum failing as was the positioning of the referendum on the ballot. The referendum was located on the back of the ballot. The description of the referendum took up half the page, and was purposely confusing.

Real estate groups reported satisfaction with the result of the election and expressed a desire to develop solutions for the city's housing crisis that does not involve taxation.

The Bring Chicago Coalition and Mayor Johnson stated they were "nowhere near the end of the journey" and reported to continue the campaign for homelessness prevention resources in Chicago. In February 2025, Johnson suggested that he intends to bring the question back to Chicago voters in the future.
