= LaTanya McDade =

PWCS Superintendent in Northern Virginia

Dr. LaTanya McDade

Superintendent of Prince William County Public Schools
- Incumbent
- Assumed office July 2021
- Appointed by: Prince William County School Board
- Deputy: Dr. Carol E. Flenard
- Preceded by: Dr. Steve Walts

Acting CEO of Chicago Public Schools
- In office June 30, 2021 – July 1, 2021
- Mayor: Lori Lightfoot
- Preceded by: Janice K. Jackson
- Succeeded by: José Torres (interim); Pedro Martinez

Personal details
- Education: Chicago State University (BA), Loyola University Chicago (MEd), Lewis University (EdD)
- Awards: Virginia Region IV Superintendent of the Year (2024)
- Website: Superintendent of Schools, Prince William County Public Schools

LaTanya D. McDade (born 1973) is the first African American and first woman to serve as superintendent of Prince William County Public Schools in Virginia. McDade has had a long career in education at Chicago Public Schools in Chicago, Illinois, formerly a teacher, principal, and the Chief Education Officer.

== Early life and education ==
McDade attended Chicago State University and earned her Bachelor of Arts in Education in 1998. In 2001, McDade completed her Master of Education in Educational Leadership and Administration, General, from Loyola University Chicago. In 2021, LaTanya McDade earned her Doctor of Education in Educational Administration and Supervision from Lewis University in Romeoville, IL.

== Career ==
=== Chicago Public Schools ===
Starting in 1998, McDade served as a middle-school teacher for the Chicago Public Schools. McDade went on to get promoted to Assistant Principal of the Keller Regional Gifted Center in July 2002 and eventually, Principal, in July 2006.

In May 2012, McDade would take on the role of Chief of Schools, working in the central office of Chicago Public Schools. In this position, she facilitated a 9.7% networkwide increase in reading and 5.2% in mathematics. In August 2016, McDade was promoted to Chief Office of Teaching and Learning, now titled, Chief Education Officer. Here, she oversaw over 240,000 students across 638 schools, fostering high-quality education with the use of statewide testing, while also assisting the management of a $3.4 billion budget.

In her role as Chief Education Officer, McDade oversaw the transition from in-person learning to virtual learning during the COVID-19 pandemic.

On July 1, 2021, Dr. LaTanya McDade was appointed by Prince William County Public Schools in Northern Virginia to serve as Superintendent starting in the school year of 2021-22.

=== Prince William County Public Schools ===
Since joining PWCS, McDade has improved the on-time graduation rate. For the school year of 2023-24, 94.3% of students graduated on time, a 2.6% increase over the previous year. McDade has also reduced “chronic absenteeism by 5.4%.”

In 2024, McDade’s contract was extended until June 30, 2028. Her salary was increased to $387,994, 6% more than 2023.

=== Research and initiatives ===
During her tenure as chief education officer of Chicago Public Schools, McDade supported many research programs devoted to improving education nationwide. The research highlighted that young women’s grades were higher compared to their male classmates in the ninth-grade level (pp. 2–4). McDade also supported research around attendance levels as young as kindergarten, and the strong impacts that absenteeism can have on young children.

=== Other positions held ===
McDade volunteers at several different organizations nationwide. She is a member at Alpha Kappa Alpha sorority. McDade served on the board for Chicago State University in 2019 after being appointed by Illinois governor J. B. Pritzker.

McDade sits on the board of directors for 1EdTech Consortium, a nonprofit dedicated to increasing the use of trusted technology in the role of education. McDade also sits on the board of directors for Heart of America since June 2023, a nonprofit that improves equity in classrooms nationwide.

== Awards and recognition ==
In January 2024, McDade was named Region IV Superintendent of the Year after a unanimous nomination by her Region IV colleagues. McDade has also been given several honors, including being named in Northern Virginia Magazine’s 50 Most Influential People of 2024.

She was also given the 2022 Citizen of the Year Award for the Pi Lambda Lambda chapter of Omega Psi Phi fraternity. Additionally, McDade was recognized by the Washingtonian as being one of the 150 most powerful women in 2021 and the ‘Chicago Defender’ Women of Excellence award in 2019 during her time at Chicago Public Schools.
