= Joe Holberg =

American businessman

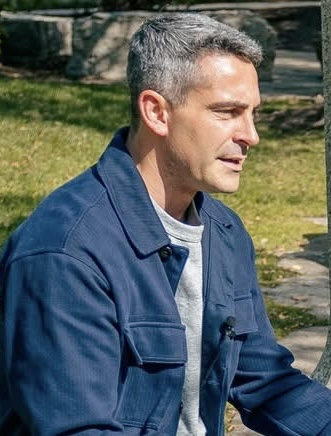
- Holberg in 2025

Personal details
- Party: Democratic
- Education: University of Michigan (BS)
- Website: Campaign website

Joe Holberg is an American businessman and politician who founded, and sold, a money management firm Holberg Financial (later renamed Spring), and is running for Mayor of Chicago in the 2027 election.

== Early life ==
Holberg attended the University of Michigan and due to financial difficulties had to choose between paying rent or paying for tuition, opting to pay his tuition and be homeless, living in a car on foodstamps. After graduating he worked as a teacher in Chicago's West Side. He also worked for AmeriCorps.

== Business career ==
Holberg opened a money management firm, Holberg Financial, in 2015 to help prevent people from having a similar experience to his in college. The firm created software to serve as an online work benefit program to bridge the gap between employers and employees when it comes to providing adequate financial guidance. In 2017 Holberg published a book Rogue Finances which hoped to educate millennials on financial responsibility. In 2018 Holberg would give a TEDx talk at his alma mater on financial responsibility.

In 2018 Holberg Financial received $1 million in seed capital from Chicago-based angel investors and venture capitalists. In 2021 Holberg would rename the company "Spring" with the firm being bought out by Mariner Wealth Advisors in January 2023 with Holberg becoming Mariner's managing director of its new financial wellness department which would be built with Spring as its core.

== Political career ==
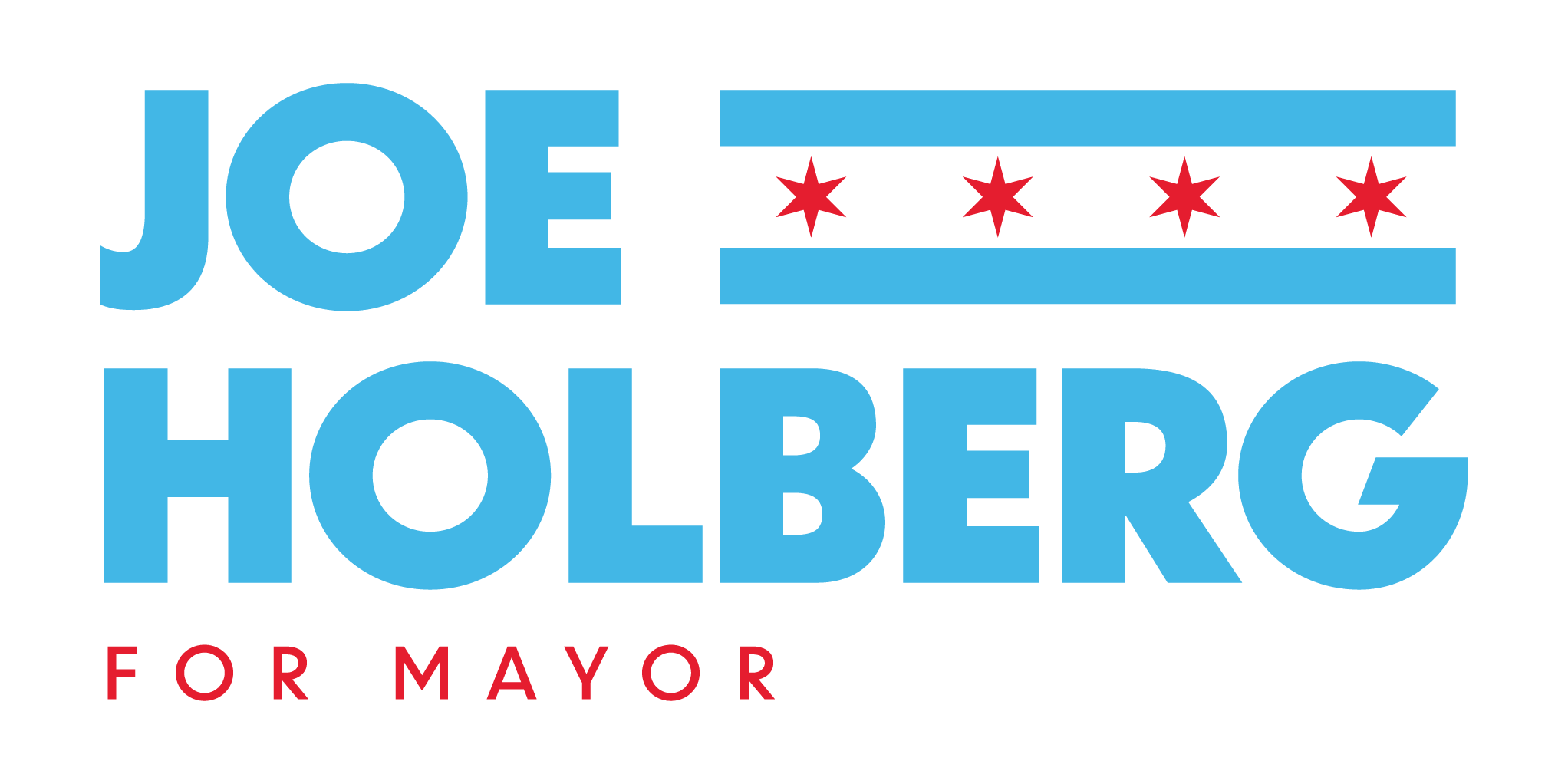
Holberg's 2027 mayoral campaign logo.

Holberg announced that he would be running for Mayor of Chicago in the 2027 election. He was the first candidate to formally announced his bid and centered his campaign on reducing the cost of living by balancing the city's finances. He has also highlighted being a political outsider stating it prevents him from being bound by Chicago's political elites. Holberg lent his own campaign $400,000 shortly after Christmas 2025, on top of another $100,000 in contributions before then, making him one of the best financed candidates in the running. In July of 2026 Holberg published the first campaign book in Chicago history, The Holberg Plan: A Mayoral Candidate's Vision for Chicago outlines his campaign priorities, plan, and vision for Chicago.

== Published works ==
- Rogue Finances ISBN 1619846047
- A Brief Discourse on Financial Justice ISBN 1985127091
- The Holberg Plan: A Mayoral Candidate's Vision for Chicago ISBN 9798997289607
