= San Ysidro School District =

School district in California, United States

Address
- 4350 Otay Mesa Road San Ysidro, California; United States

District information
- Grades: K–8
- Established: 1887
- Schools: 5 elementary, 2 middle, 1 preschool
- NCES District ID: 0635220

Students and staff
- Students: 4,419 (2020–2021)
- Teachers: 184.5 (FTE)
- Staff: 259.72 (FTE)
- Student–teacher ratio: 23.95:1

Other information
- Website: www.sysdschools.org

San Ysidro School District (SYSD) is a public school district based in San Diego County, California, United States. It includes five elementary schools, one middle school, and several preschools in the San Ysidro community of San Diego, as well as two elementary schools elsewhere in San Diego.

== History ==
In the 2012–2013 school year, there was conflict between the San Ysidro Teachers association and the school board. Teachers accused the school board of favoritism toward the assistant superintendent, Jason Romero, because his mother sat on the school board. The connection became controversial when she voted to give her son a $10,000 raise. Teachers also opposed a proposal to give the school board the final say over teacher grievances, which amounted to a review of actions by Romero. As of February 2013, no contract had been agreed to, and teachers were picketing outside some schools.

An investigation took place over a $2,500 cash payment in 2010 to school superintendent Manuel Paul from a contractor with business pending before the district. Paul said the money was intended for the election campaigns of school board members. He and 14 other people were indicted January 15, 2013 on corruption charges. On April 4, the school board voted 3–2 to accept his resignation.

== Schools ==
=== Elementary ===
- La Mirada School
- Ocean View School
- Smythe School
- Sunset School
- Willow School
- Beyer School " Permanently Closed due to local corruption"

=== Middle ===
- San Ysidro Middle School
- Vista Del Mar Middle School
