= Homelessness services =

Specialized programs assisting homeless people

Homelessness services are specialized programs assisting homeless people. While homelessness services may be government-run or government funded, non-profit organizations often play an important role in service delivery. Services supporting homeless people may assist them to achieve positive change in their life and reduce the use of both homelessness services and of other welfare services. While these services are specifically geared toward homeless people, researchers note that the drivers and the responses to homelessness stretch beyond the scope of such services.

Some countries have a scarcity of rigorous research on the outcomes of specialized homelessness services. Others have adopted statistical collection programs to conduct research on outcomes and service delivery.

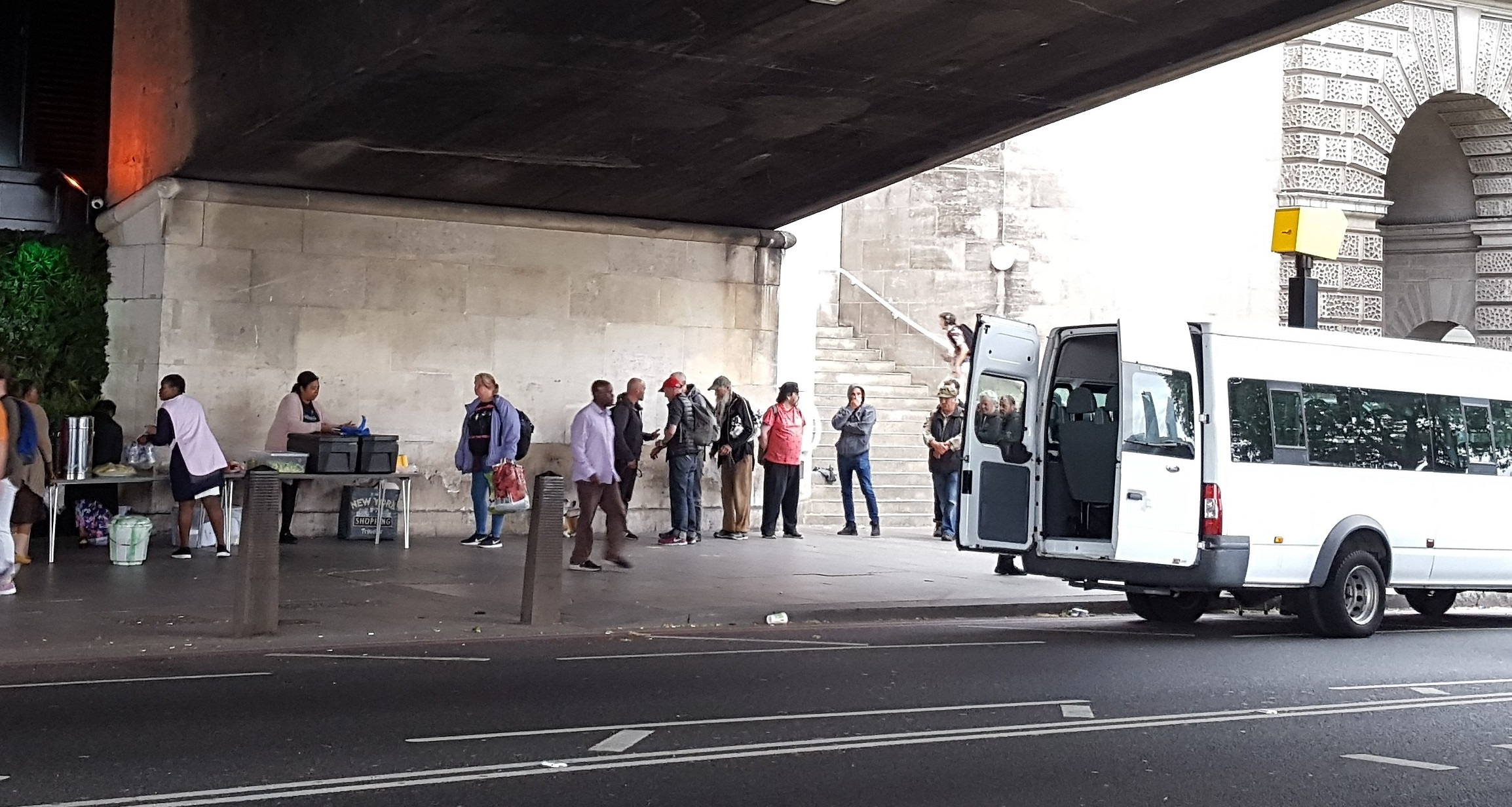
Soup Run provided by a charity

In some countries, the majority of homelessness services are members of a peak body organization. Homelessness peak bodies typically have a reference group made up of member services and meet at least once a year in annual or bi-annual conferences. In other countries, an inter-agency council may represent various state-run services.

Researchers found that local government can play a positive role in expanding the range of services and assisting with or helping to secure funding for services.

== Government contracting ==
A study in England found that competition for contracts had both beneficial as well as problematic implications for homelessness services. Competition also raises tensions among cooperating services. An Australian study found that while social workers employed in homelessness services constructed their professional identities by drawing on debates in social work literature and tensions in practice, their identity is overshadowed by organizational contexts, influencing work practice in homelessness services.

== Service dynamics ==
Individuals experiencing homelessness will often prefer a specialist homelessness team and be reluctant to engage with mainstream services, or be unwilling to be referred on to another service.

A case management approach to service delivery in homelessness services have been found to be important components of service integration. And clients from more integrated services were more likely to report positive outcomes than were clients of less integrated services. Clients from more integrated services were also more likely to report that various service providers worked together to coordinate their care. The study found that 40 per cent of Australian specialist homelessness services provide mental health services and 35 per cent also provide drug and alcohol support.
