= Green vehicle =

Environmentally friendly vehicles

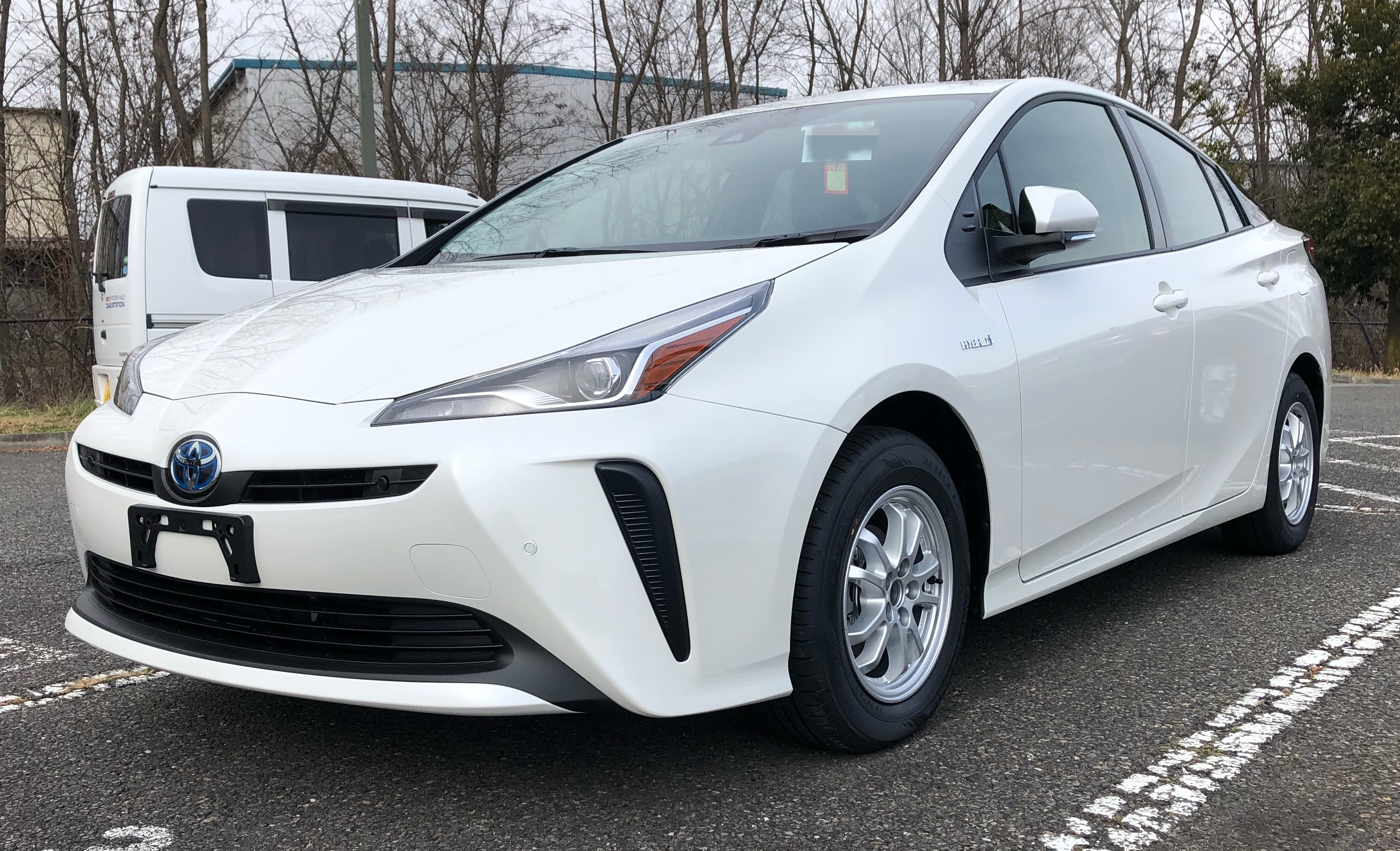
The Toyota Prius is the world's top selling hybrid electric vehicle, with global sales of 3.7 million units through April 2016. Some owners use its identity to make an environmental statement.

A green vehicle, clean vehicle, eco-friendly vehicle or environmentally friendly vehicle is a road motor vehicle that produces less harmful impacts to the environment than comparable conventional internal combustion engine vehicles running on gasoline or diesel, or one that uses certain alternative fuels. Presently, in some countries the term is used for any vehicle complying or surpassing the more stringent European emission standards (such as Euro6), or California's zero-emissions vehicle standards (such as ZEV, ULEV, SULEV, PZEV), or the low-carbon fuel standards enacted in several countries.

Green vehicles can be powered by alternative fuels and advanced vehicle technologies and include hybrid electric vehicles, plug-in hybrid electric vehicles, battery electric vehicles, compressed-air vehicles, hydrogen and fuel-cell vehicles, neat ethanol vehicles, flexible-fuel vehicles, natural gas vehicles, clean diesel vehicles, and some sources also include vehicles using blends of biodiesel and ethanol fuel or gasohol. In 2021, with an EPA-rated fuel economy of 142 miles per gallon gasoline equivalent (mpg-e) (1.7 L/100 km), the 2021 Tesla Model 3 Standard Range Plus RWD became the most efficient EPA-certified vehicle considering all fuels and all years, surpassing the 2020 Tesla Model 3 Standard Range Plus and 2019 Hyundai Ioniq Electric.

Several authors also include conventional motor vehicles with high fuel economy, as they consider that increasing fuel economy is the most cost-effective way to improve energy efficiency and reduce carbon emissions in the transport sector in the short run. As part of their contribution to sustainable transport, these vehicles reduce air pollution and greenhouse gas emissions, and contribute to energy independence by reducing oil imports.

An environmental analysis extends beyond just the operating efficiency and emissions. A life-cycle assessment involves production and post-use considerations. A cradle-to-cradle design is more important than a focus on a single factor such as energy efficiency.

== Energy efficiency ==
Cars with similar production of energy costs can be obtained, during the life of the car (operational phase), large reductions in energy costs through several measures:

- The most significant is by using alternative propulsion:
  - An efficient engine that reduces the vehicle's consumption of petroleum (i.e. petroleum electric hybrid vehicle), or that uses renewable energy sources throughout its working life.
  - Using biofuels instead of petroleum fuels.
- Proper maintenance of a vehicle such as engine tune-ups, oil changes, and maintaining proper tire pressure can also help.
- Removing unnecessary items from a vehicle reduces weight and improves fuel economy as well.

Comparison of several types of green car basic characteristics (Values are overall for vehicles in current production and may differ between types)
Type of vehicle/ powertrain	Fuel economy (mpg equivalent)	Range	Production cost for given range	Reduction in CO_{2} compared to conventional	Payback period
Conventional ICE	10–48	Long (400–600 mi)	Low	0%	-
Biodiesel	18–71	Long (360–540 mi)	Low	varies depending on biodiesel source	-
All-electric	54–142	Shorter (114–259 mi); Luxury models Medium (419–516 mi)	High Very high	varies depending on energy source	-
Hydrogen fuel cell	80		Astronomical		
Hybrid electric	30–60	380 mi	Medium		5 years

== Types ==
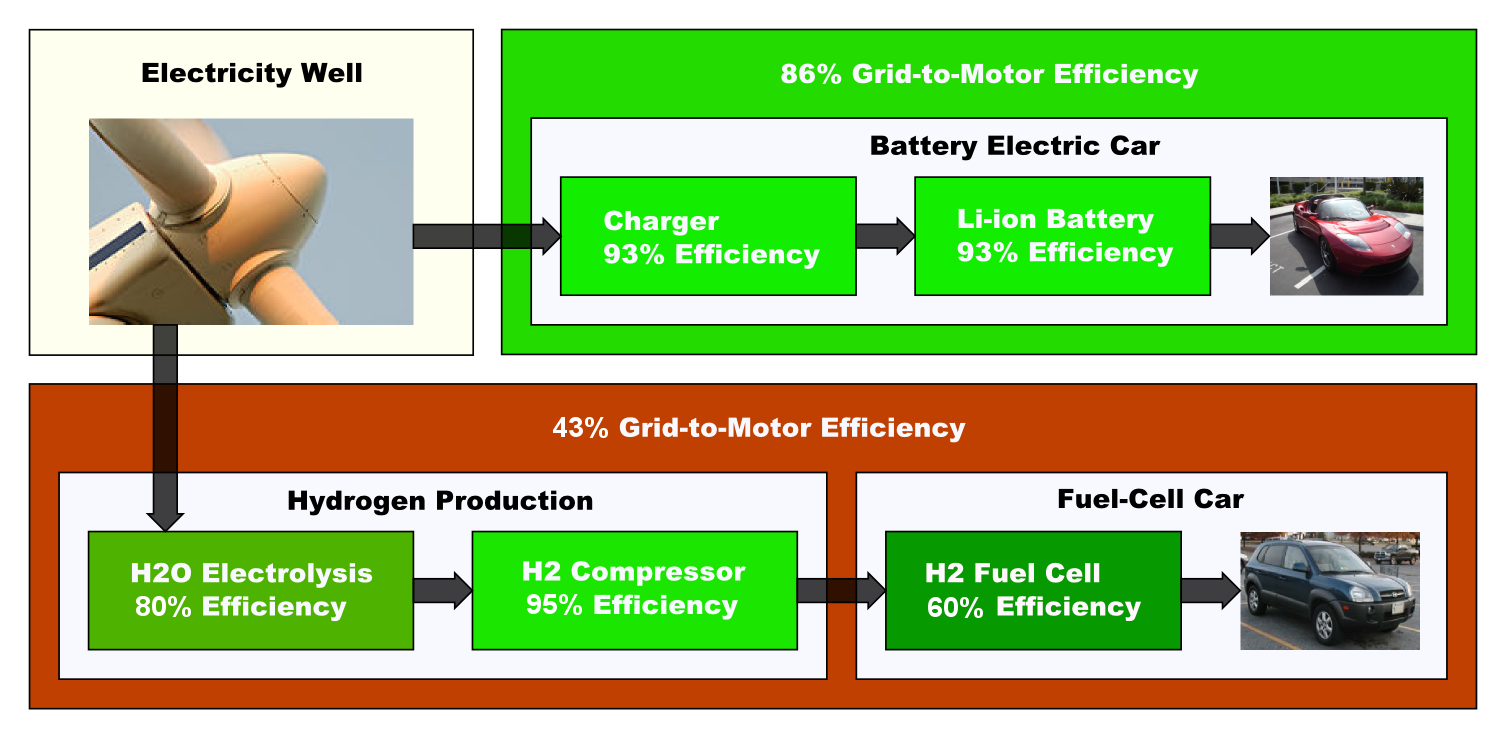
Comparison of energy efficiency between battery and hydrogen fuel-cell cars

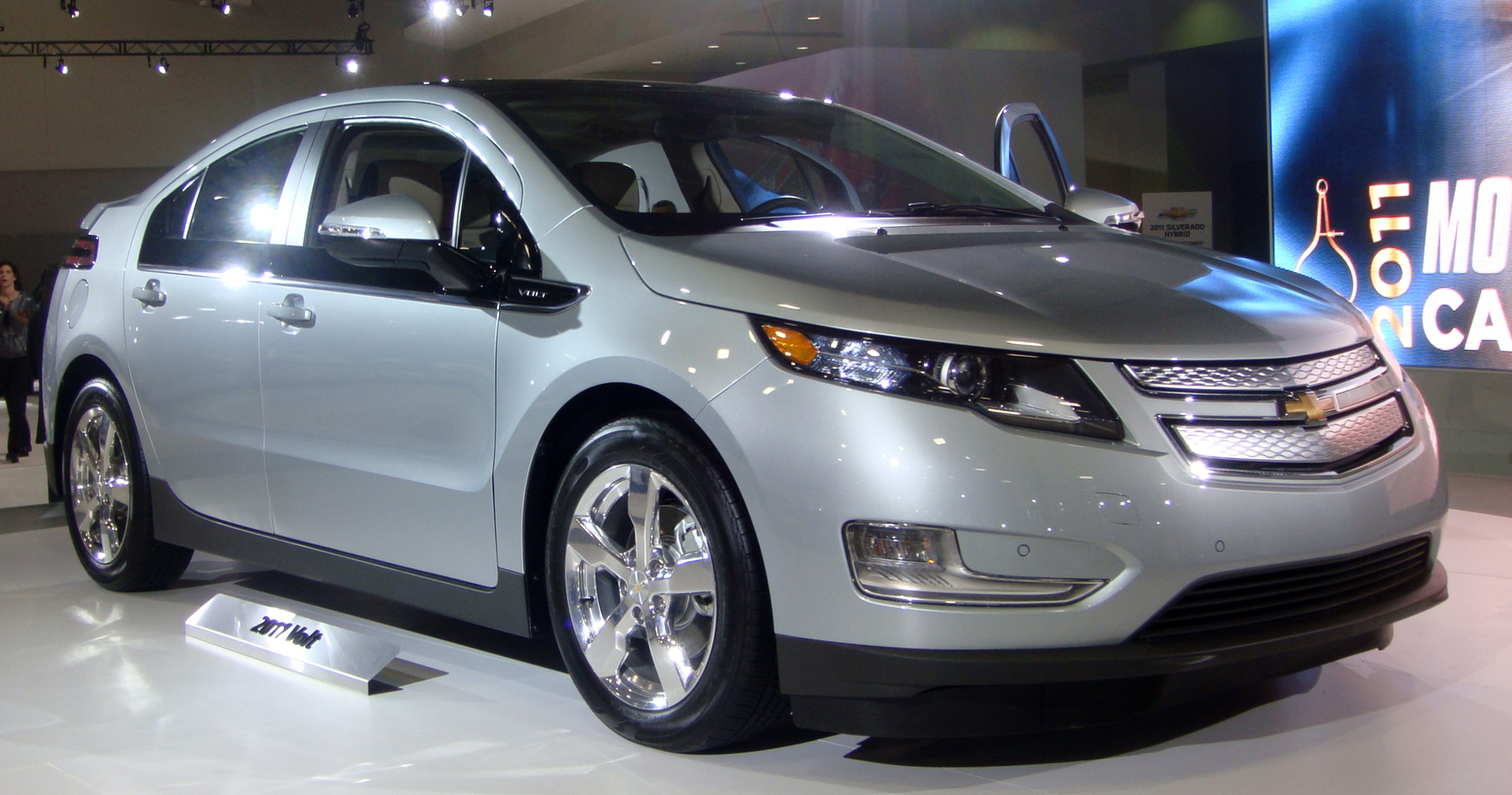

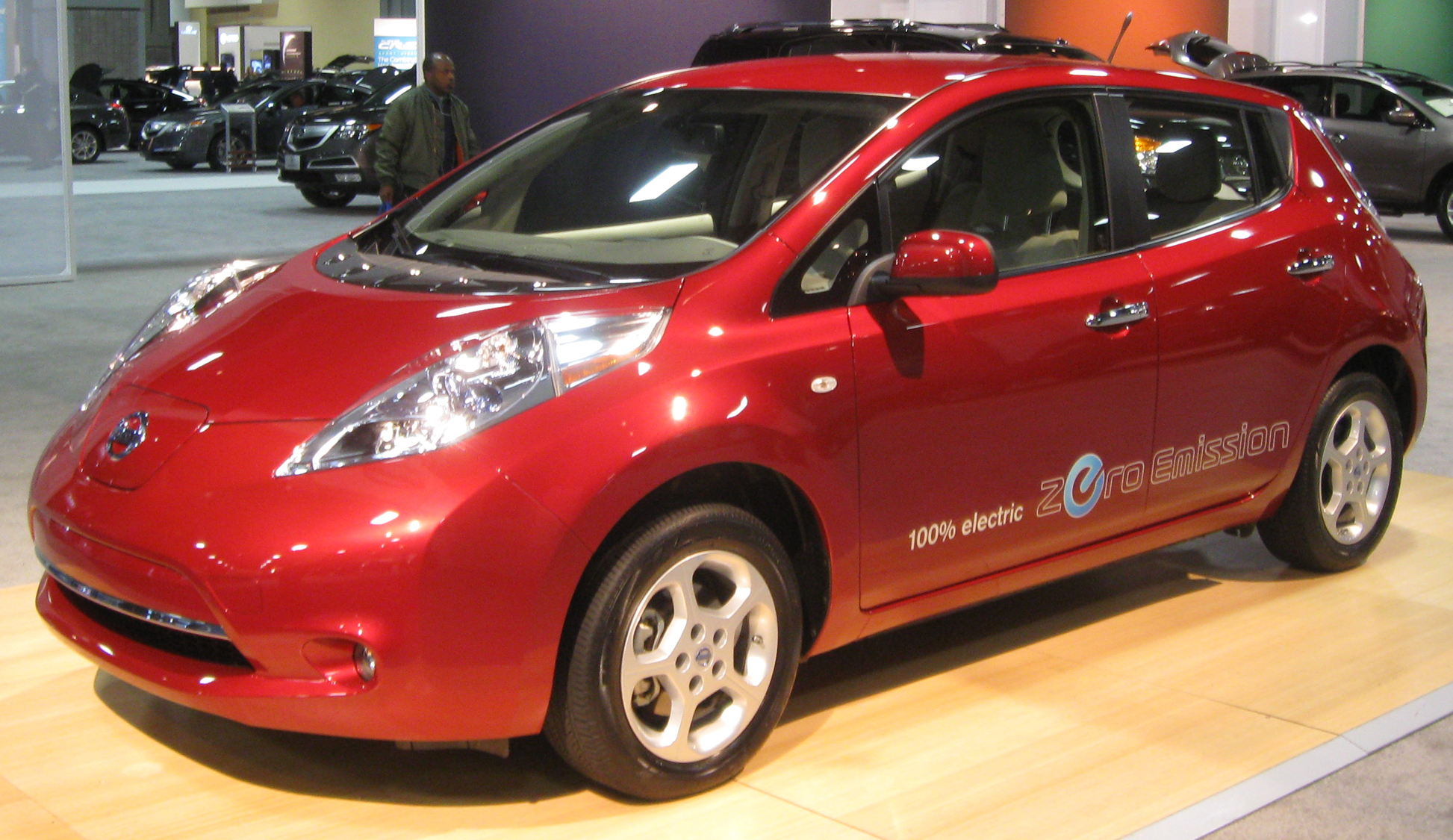
Sales of both the Chevrolet Volt plug-in hybrid (top) and the Nissan Leaf all-electric car (bottom) began in December 2010.

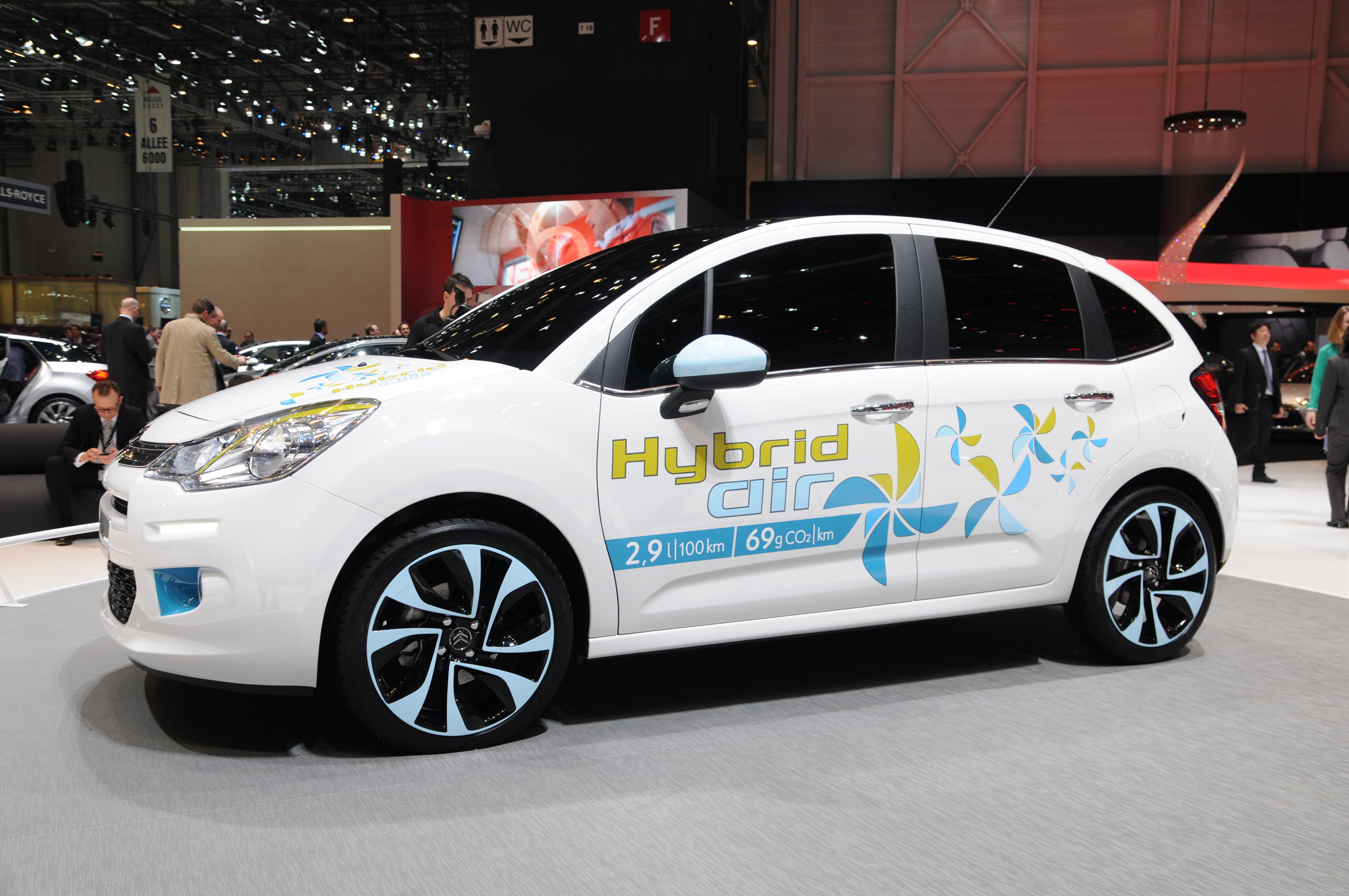
PSA Peugeot Citroën Hybrid Air concept exhibited at the 2013 Geneva Motor Show

Green vehicles include vehicles types that function fully or partly on alternative energy sources other than fossil fuel or less carbon-intensive than gasoline or diesel.

Another option is the use of alternative fuel composition in conventional fossil fuel-based vehicles, making them function partially on renewable energy sources. Other approaches include personal rapid transit, a public transportation concept that offers automated, on-demand, and non-stop transportation on a network of specially built guideways.

=== Electric and fuel cell-powered ===
Examples of vehicles with reduced petroleum consumption include electric cars, plug-in hybrids and fuel cell-powered hydrogen cars are provided to the right.

Electric cars are typically more efficient than fuel cell-powered vehicles on a Tank-to-wheel basis. They have better fuel economy than conventional internal combustion engine vehicles but are hampered by range or maximum distance attainable before discharging the battery. The electric car batteries are their main cost. They provide a 0% to 99.9% reduction in CO_{2} emissions compared to an ICE (gasoline, diesel) vehicle, depending on the source of electricity.

=== Hybrid electric vehicles ===
Hybrid cars may be partly fossil fuel (or biofuel) powered and partly electric or hydrogen-powered. Most combine an internal combustion engine with an electric engine, though other variations too exist. The internal combustion engine is often either a gasoline or Diesel engine (in rare cases a Stirling engine may even be used). They are more expensive to purchase but cost redemption is achieved in a period of about 5 years due to better fuel economy.

=== Compressed air cars, Stirling vehicles, and others ===
Compressed air cars, Stirling powered vehicles, and liquid nitrogen vehicles are less polluting than electrical vehicles, since the vehicle and its components are environment friendly.

Solar car races are held on a regular basis in order to promote green vehicles and other "green technology". These sleek driver-only vehicles can travel long distances at highway speeds using only the electricity generated from the sun.

=== Improving conventional cars ===
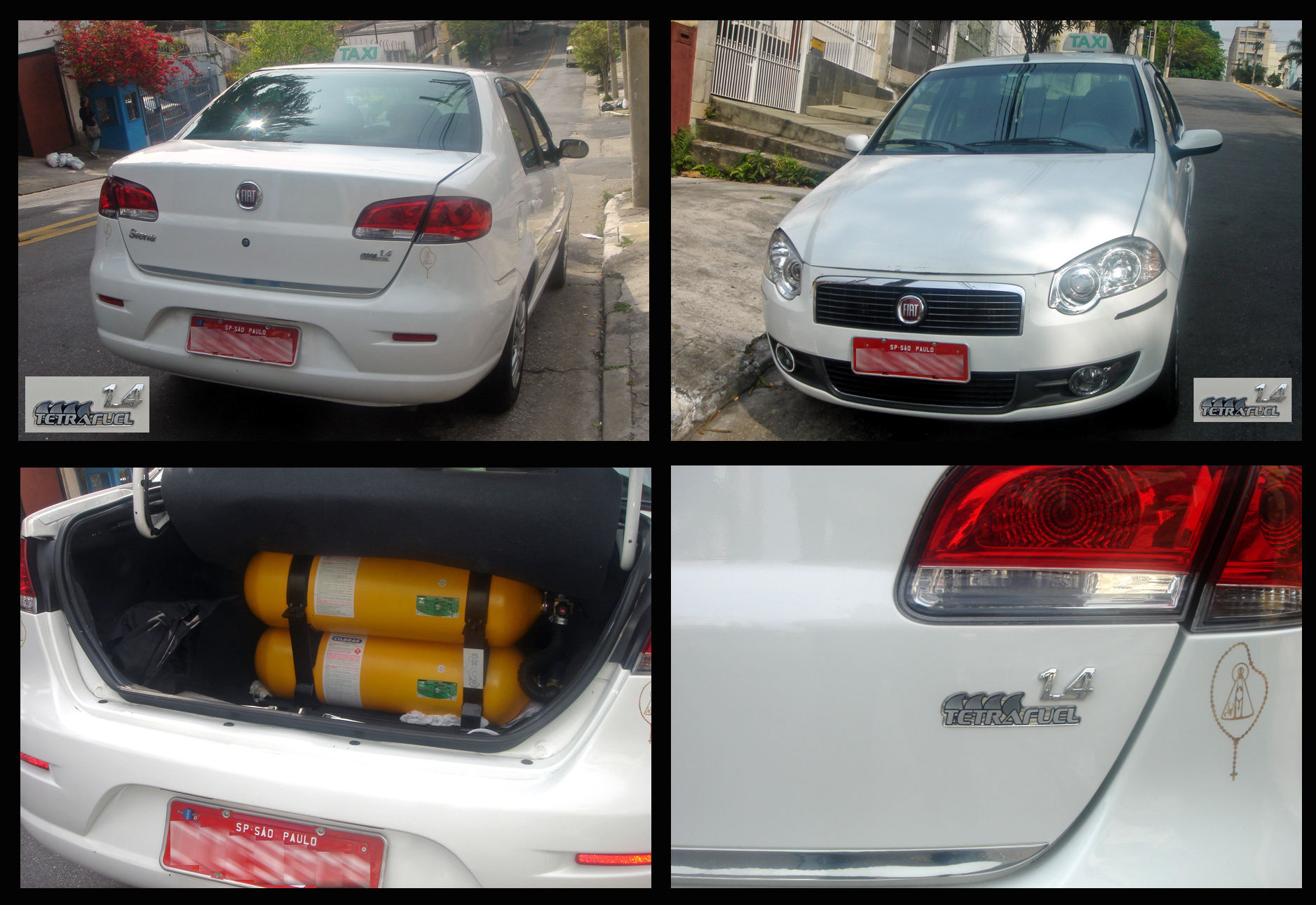
The Fiat Siena Tetrafuel 1.4 is a multifuel car designed to run as a flex-fuel on gasoline, or E20–E25 blend, or neat ethanol (E100); or to run as a bi-fuel with natural gas (CNG).

A conventional vehicle can become a greener vehicle by mixing in renewable fuels or using less carbon intensive fossil fuel. Typical gasoline-powered cars can tolerate up to 10% ethanol. Brazil manufactured cars that run on neat ethanol, though there were discontinued. Another available option is a flexible-fuel vehicle which allows any blend of gasoline and ethanol, up to 85% in North America and Europe, and up to 100% in Brazil. Another existing option is to convert a conventional gasoline-powered to allow the alternative use of CNG. Pakistan, Argentina, Brazil, Iran, India, Italy, and China have the largest fleets of natural gas vehicles in the world.

Diesel-powered vehicles can often transition completely to biodiesel, though the fuel is a very strong solvent, which can occasionally damage rubber seals in vehicles built before 1994. More commonly, however, biodiesel causes problems simply because it removes all of the built-up residue in an engine, clogging filters, unless care is taken when switching from dirty fossil-fuel derived diesel to bio-diesel. It is very effective at 'de-coking' the diesel engines combustion chambers and keeping them clean. Biodiesel is the lowest emission fuel available for diesel engines. Diesel engines are the most efficient car internal combustion engines. Biodiesel is the only fuel allowed in some North American national parks because spillages will completely bio-degrade within 21 days. Biodiesel and vegetable oil fuelled, diesel engined vehicles have been declared amongst the greenest in the US Tour de Sol competition.

This presents problems, as biofuels can use food resources in order to provide mechanical energy for vehicles. Many experts point to this as a reason for growing food prices, particularly US Bio-ethanol fuel production which has affected maize prices. In order to have a low environmental impact, biofuels should be made only from waste products, or from new sources like algae.

=== Electric Motor and Pedal Powered Vehicles ===
Multiple companies are offering and developing two, three, and four wheel vehicles combining the characteristics of a bicycle with electric motors. US Federal, State and Local laws do not clearly nor consistently classify these vehicles as bicycles, electric bicycles, motorcycles, electric motorcycles, mopeds, Neighborhood Electric Vehicle, motorised quadricycle or as a car. Some laws have limits on top speeds, power of the motors, range, etc., while others do not.

=== Other ===
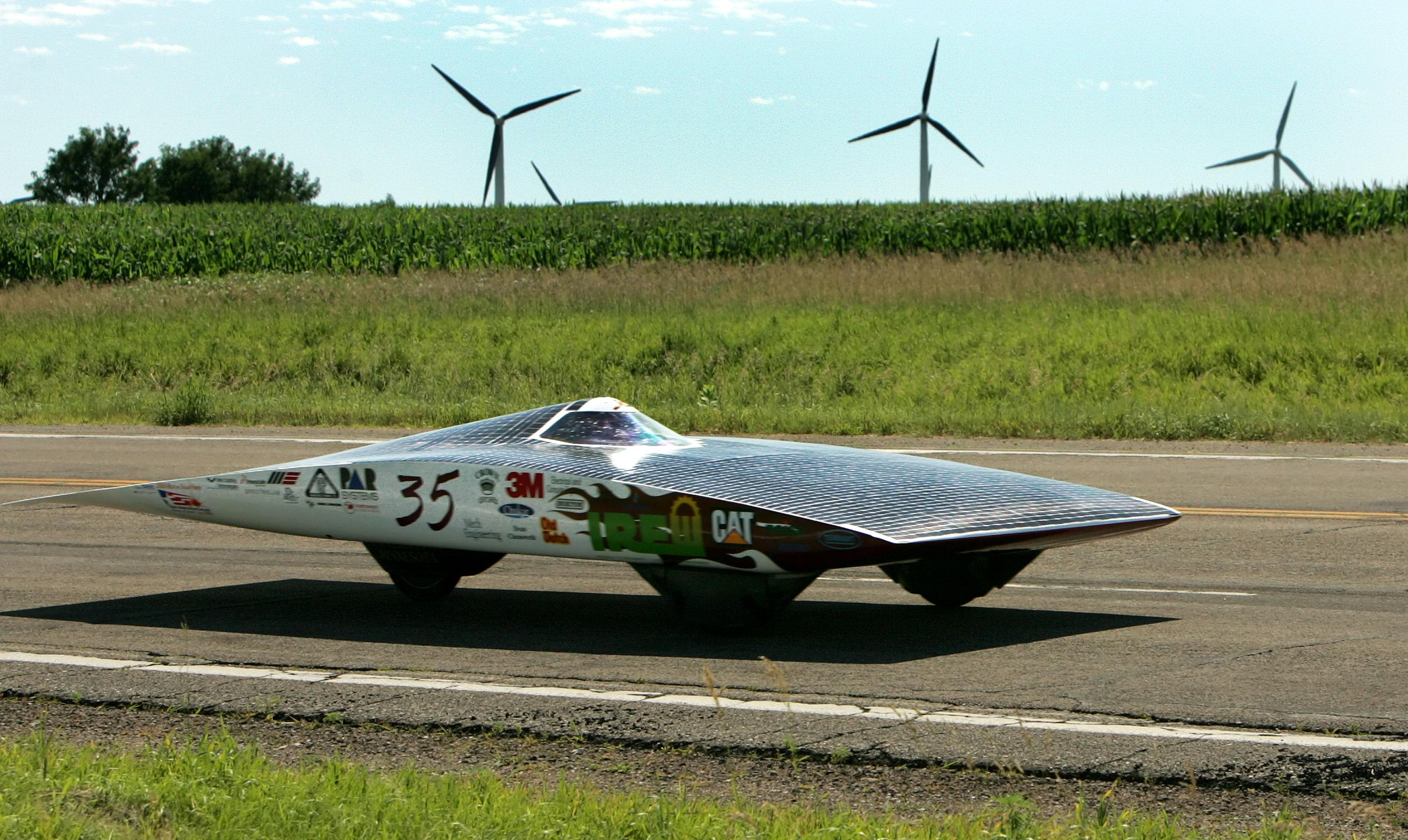
Solar vehicle

- Public transportation vehicles are not usually included in the green vehicle category, but Personal rapid transit (PRT) vehicles probably should be. All vehicles that are powered from the track have the advantage of potentially being able to use any source of electric energy, including sustainable ones, rather than requiring liquid fuels. They can also switch regenerative braking energy between vehicles and the electric grid rather than requiring energy storage on the vehicles. Also, they can potentially use the entire track area for solar collectors, not just the vehicle surface. The potential PRT energy efficiency is much higher than that which traditional automobiles can attain.
- Solar vehicles are electric vehicles powered by solar energy obtained from solar panels on the surface (generally, the roof) of the vehicle. Photovoltaic (PV) cells convert the Sun's energy directly into electrical energy. Solar vehicles are not practical day-to-day transportation devices at present, but are primarily demonstration vehicles and engineering exercises, often sponsored by government agencies. However, some cities have begun offering solar-powered buses, including the Tindo in Adelaide, Australia.
- Wind-powered electric vehicles primarily use wind-turbines installed at a strategic point of the vehicle, which are then converted into electric energy which causes the vehicle to propel.

== Animal powered vehicles ==
Horse and carriage are just one type of animal propelled vehicle. Once a common form of transportation, they became far less common as cities grew and automobiles took their place. In dense cities, the waste produced by large numbers of transportation animals was a significant health problem. Oftentimes the food is produced for them using diesel powered tractors, and thus, there is some environmental impact as a result of their use.

== Human powered vehicles ==
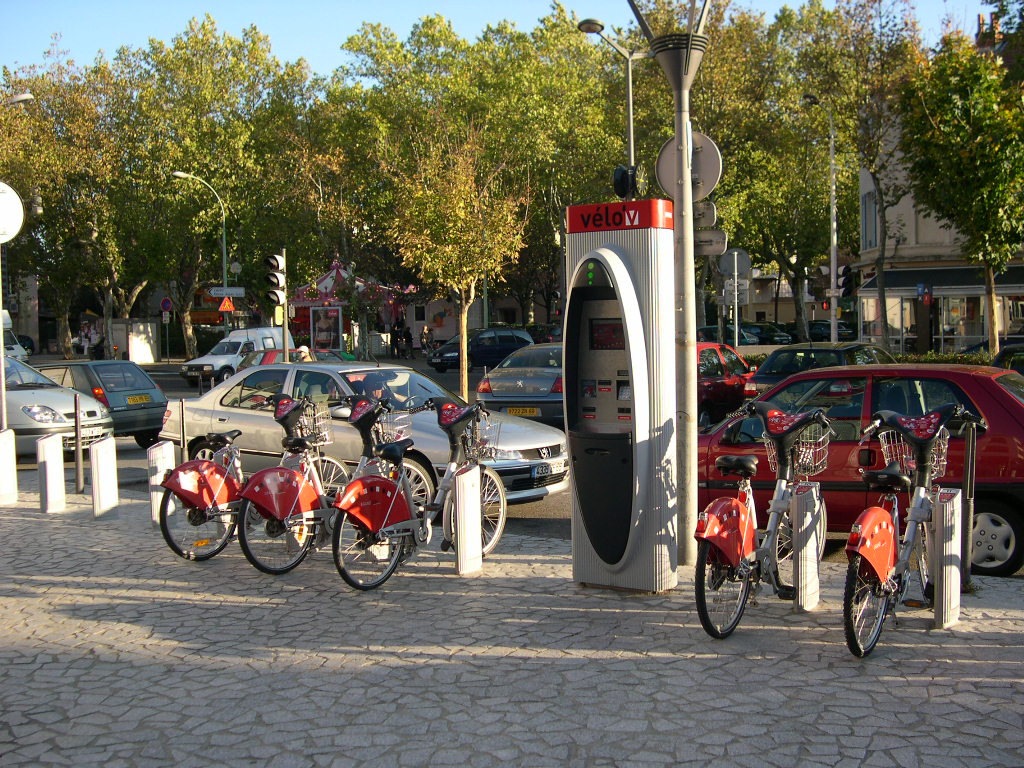
Vélo'v bicycle sharing system in Lyon, France

Human-powered transport includes walking, bicycles, velomobiles, row boats, and more environmentally friendly ways of getting around. In addition to the health benefits of the exercise provided, they are far more environmentally friendly than most other options. The only downside is the speed limitations, and how far one can travel before getting exhausted.

== Benefits of green vehicle use ==
=== Environmental ===
Vehicle emissions contribute to the increasing concentration of gases linked to climate change. In order of significance, the principal greenhouse gases associated with road transport are carbon dioxide (CO_{2}), methane (CH_{4}) and nitrous oxide (N_{2}O). Road transport is the third largest source of greenhouse gases emitted in the UK, and accounts for about 27% of total emissions, and 33% in the United States. Of the total greenhouse gas emissions from transport, over 85% are due to CO_{2} emissions from road vehicles. The transport sector is the fastest growing source of greenhouse gases.

=== Health ===
Vehicle pollutants have been linked to human ill health including the incidence of respiratory and cardiopulmonary disease and lung cancer. A 1998 report estimated that up to 24,000 people die prematurely each year in the UK as a direct result of air pollution. According to the World Health Organization, up to 13,000 deaths per year among children (aged 0–4 years) across Europe are directly attributable to outdoor pollution. The organization estimates that if pollution levels were returned to within EU limits, more than 5,000 of these lives could be saved each year.

=== Monetary ===
Hybrid taxi fleet operators in New York have also reported that reduced fuel consumption saves them thousands of dollars per year.

=== Criticism ===
A study by CNW Marketing Research suggested that the extra energy cost of manufacture, shipping, disposal, and the short lives of some of these types of vehicle (particularly gas-electric hybrid vehicles) outweighs any energy savings made by their using less petroleum during their useful lifespan. This type of argument is the long smokestack argument. Critics of the report note that the study prorated all of Toyota's hybrid research-and-development costs across the relatively small number of Priuses on the road, rather than using the incremental cost of building a vehicle; used109,000 miles (175,000 km) for the length of life of a Prius (Toyota offers a 150,000-mile (240,000 km) warranty on the Prius' hybrid components, including the battery), and calculated that a majority of a car's cradle-to-grave energy gets expended during the vehicle's production, not while it is driven. Norwegian Consumer Ombudsman official Bente Øverli stated that "cars cannot do anything good for the environment except less damage than others." Based on this opinion, Norwegian law severely restricts the use of "greenwashing" to market automobiles, strongly prohibiting advertising a vehicle as being environmentally friendly, with large fines issued to violators.

Some studies try to compare environmental impact of electric and petrol vehicles over complete life cycle, including production, operation, and dismantling. In general, results differ vastly dependent on the region considered, due to difference in energy sources to produce electricity that fuels electric vehicles. When considering only CO_{2} emissions, it is noted that production of electric cars generate about twice as much emissions as that of internal combustion cars. However, emissions of CO_{2} during operation are much larger (on average) than during production. For electric cars, emissions caused during operation depend on energy sources used to produce electricity and thus vary a lot geographically. Studies suggest that when taking into account both production and operation, electric cars would cause more emissions in economies where production of electricity is not clean, e.g., it is mostly coal based. For this reason, some studies found that driving electric cars is less environmentally damaging in western US states than in eastern ones, where less electricity is produced using cleaner sources. Similarly, in countries like India, Australia or China, where large portion of electricity is produced by using coal, driving electric vehicles would cause larger environmental damage than driving petrol vehicles. When justifying use of electric cars over petrol cars, these kinds of studies do not provide sufficiently clear results. Environmental impact is calculated based on fuel mix used to produce electricity that powers electric cars. However, when a gas vehicle is replaced by an equivalent electric vehicle, additional power must be installed in electrical grid. This additional capacity would normally not be based on the same ratios of energy sources ("clean" versus fossil fuels) than the current capacity. Only when additional electricity production capacity installed to switch from petrol to electric vehicles would predominantly consist of clean sources, switch to electric vehicles could reduce environmental damage. Another common problem in methodology used in comparative studies is that it only focuses on specific kinds of environmental impact. While some studies focus only on emission of gas pollutants over life cycle or only on greenhouse gas emissions such as CO2, comparison should also account for other environmental impacts such as pollutants released otherwise during production and operation or ingredients that can not be effectively recycled. Examples include use of lighter high performing metals, lithium batteries and more rare metals in electric cars, which all have high environmental impact.

A study that also looked at factors other than energy consumption and carbon emissions has suggested that there is no such thing as an environmentally friendly car.

The use of vehicles with increased fuel efficiency is usually considered positive in the short term but criticism of any hydrocarbon-based personal transport remains. The Jevons paradox suggests that energy efficiency programs are often counter-productive, even increasing energy consumption in the long run. Many environmental researchers believe that sustainable transport may require a move away from hydrocarbon fuels and from our present automobile and highway paradigm.

== National and international promotion ==
=== European Union ===
The European Union is promoting the marketing of greener cars via a combination of binding and non-binding measures. As of September 2025, 19 of the 27 member states of the European Union provide tax incentives for electrically chargeable vehicles and some alternative fuel vehicles, which includes all EU countries except Germany, Denmark, Italy, Finland, Slovakia, Bulgaria, Latvia and Romania. The incentives consist of tax reductions and exemptions, as well as of bonus payments for buyers of electric cars, plug-in hybrids, hybrid electric vehicles and natural gas vehicles.

=== United States ===
The United States Environmental Protection Agency (EPA) is promoting the marketing of greener cars via the SmartWay program. The SmartWay and SmartWay Elite designation mean that a vehicle is a better environmental performer relative to other vehicles. This US EPA designation is arrived at by taking into account a vehicle's Air Pollution Score and Greenhouse Gas Score. Higher Air Pollution Scores indicate vehicles that emit lower amounts of pollutants that cause smog relative to other vehicles. Higher Greenhouse Gas Scores indicate vehicles that emit lower amounts of carbon dioxide and have improved fuel economy relative to other vehicles.

To earn the SmartWay designation, a vehicle must earn at least a 6 on the Air Pollution Score and at least a 6 on the Greenhouse Gas Score, but have a combined score of at least 13. SmartWay Elite is given to those vehicles that score 9 or better on both the Greenhouse Gas and Air Pollution Scores.

== Green car rankings ==
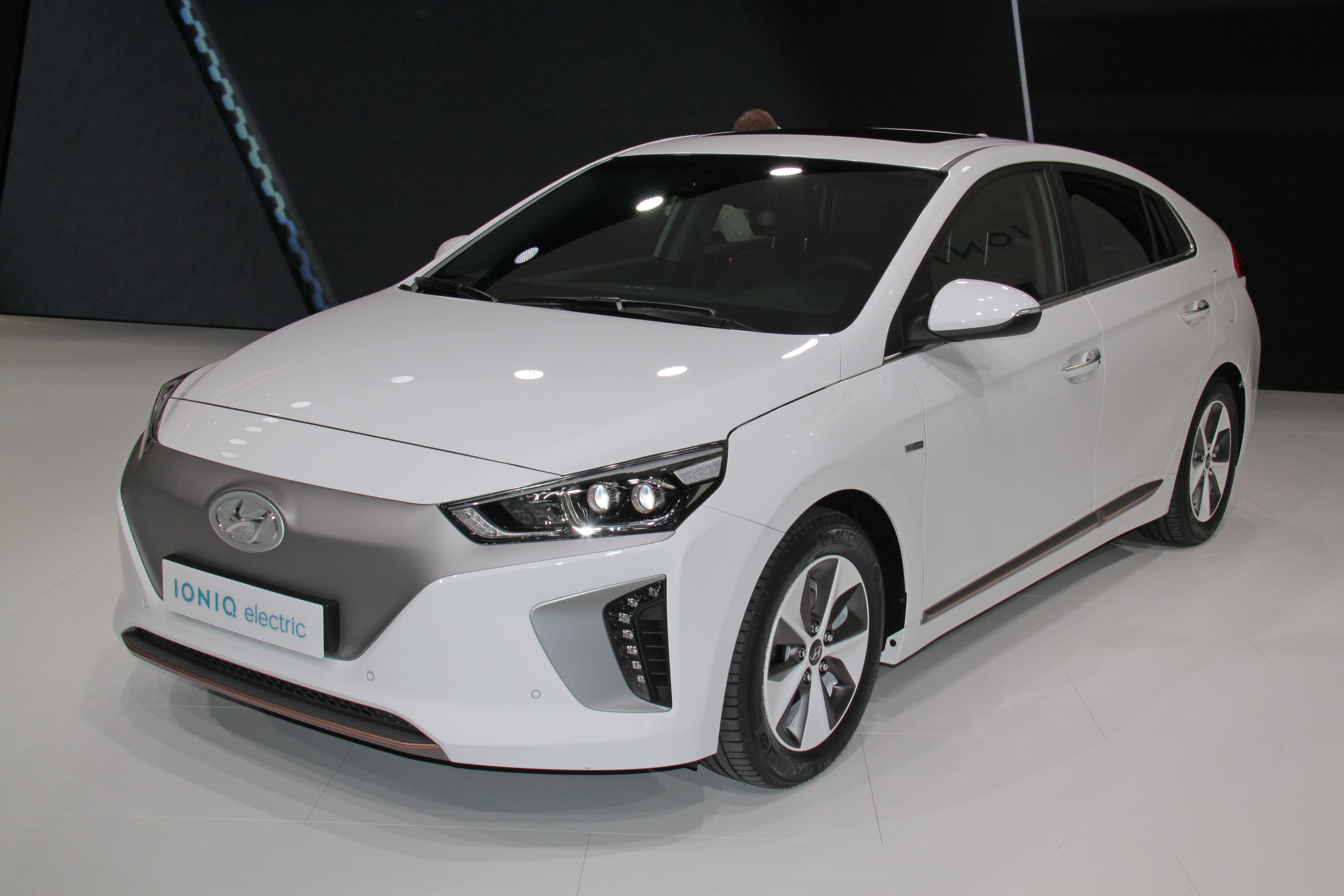
Hyundai Ioniq Electric

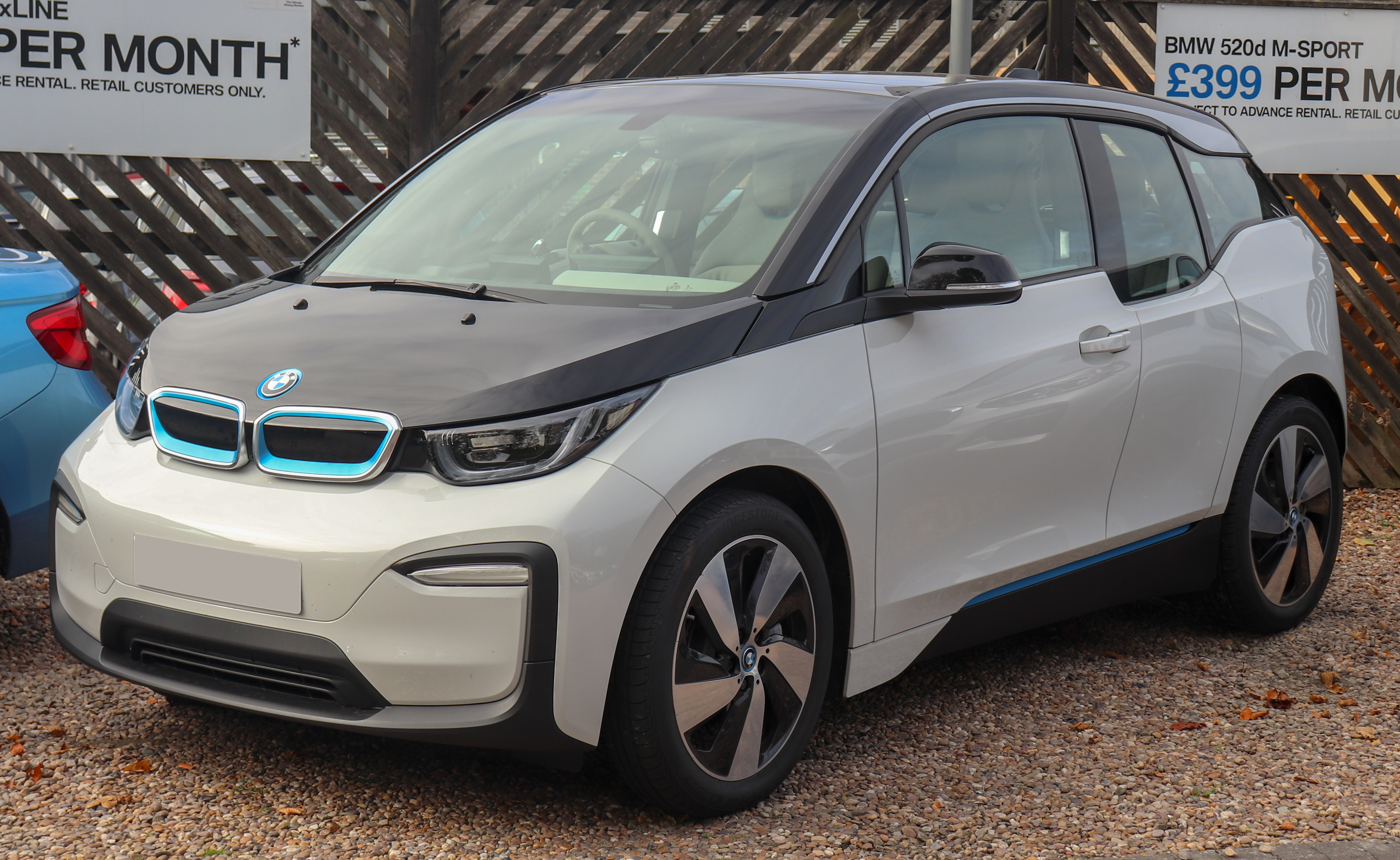
BMW i3 electric car

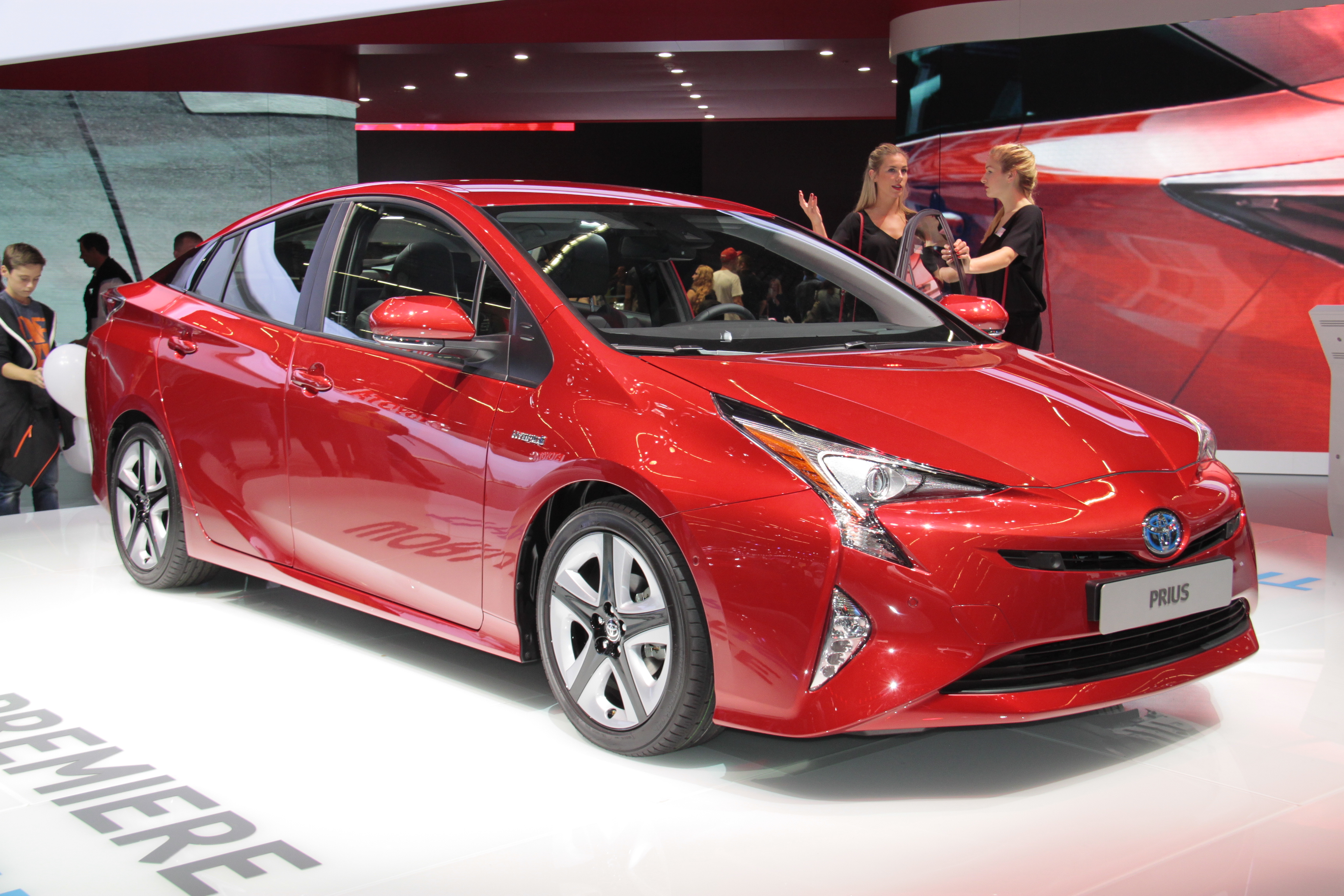
Toyota Prius Eco (4th gen)

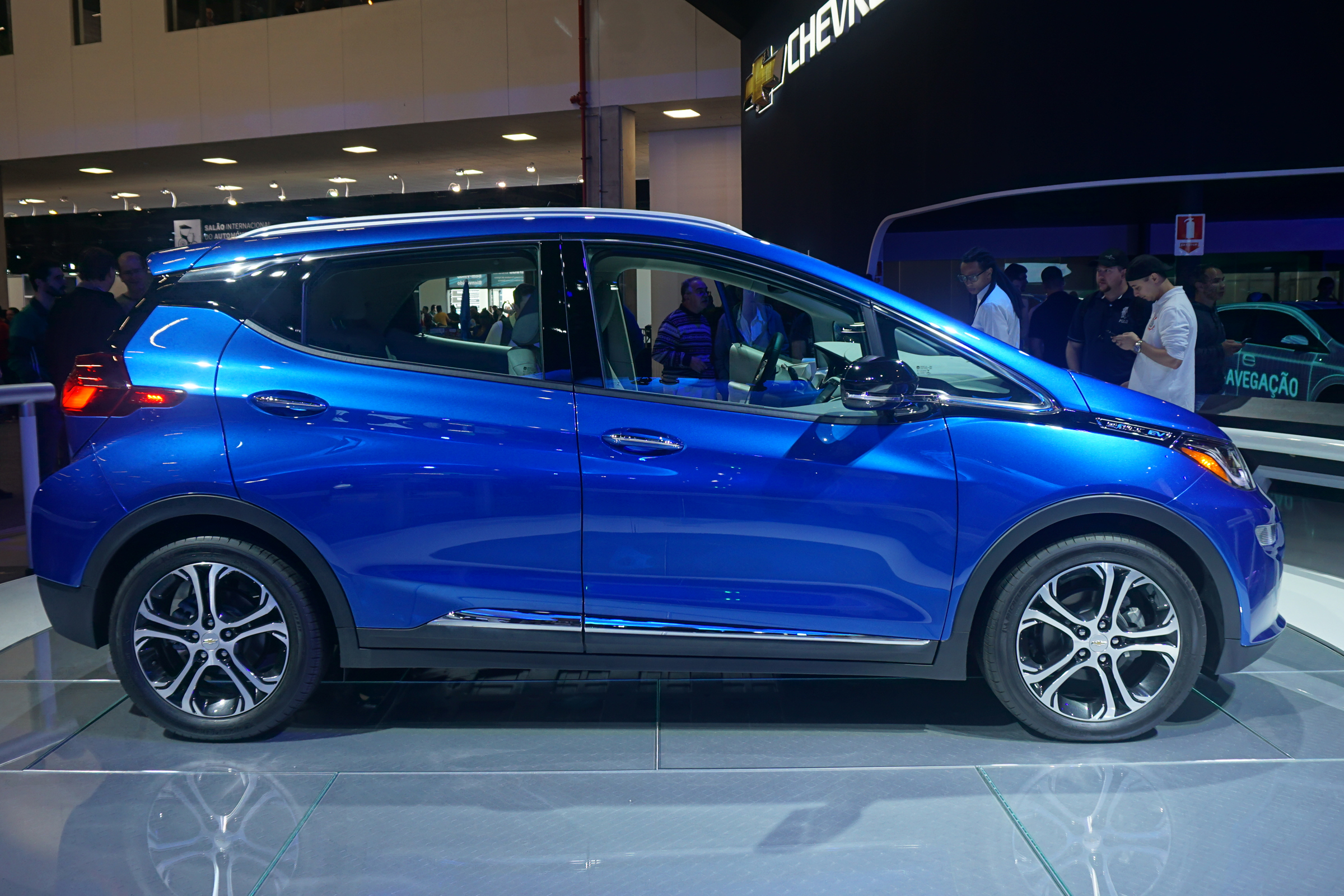
Chevrolet Bolt EV

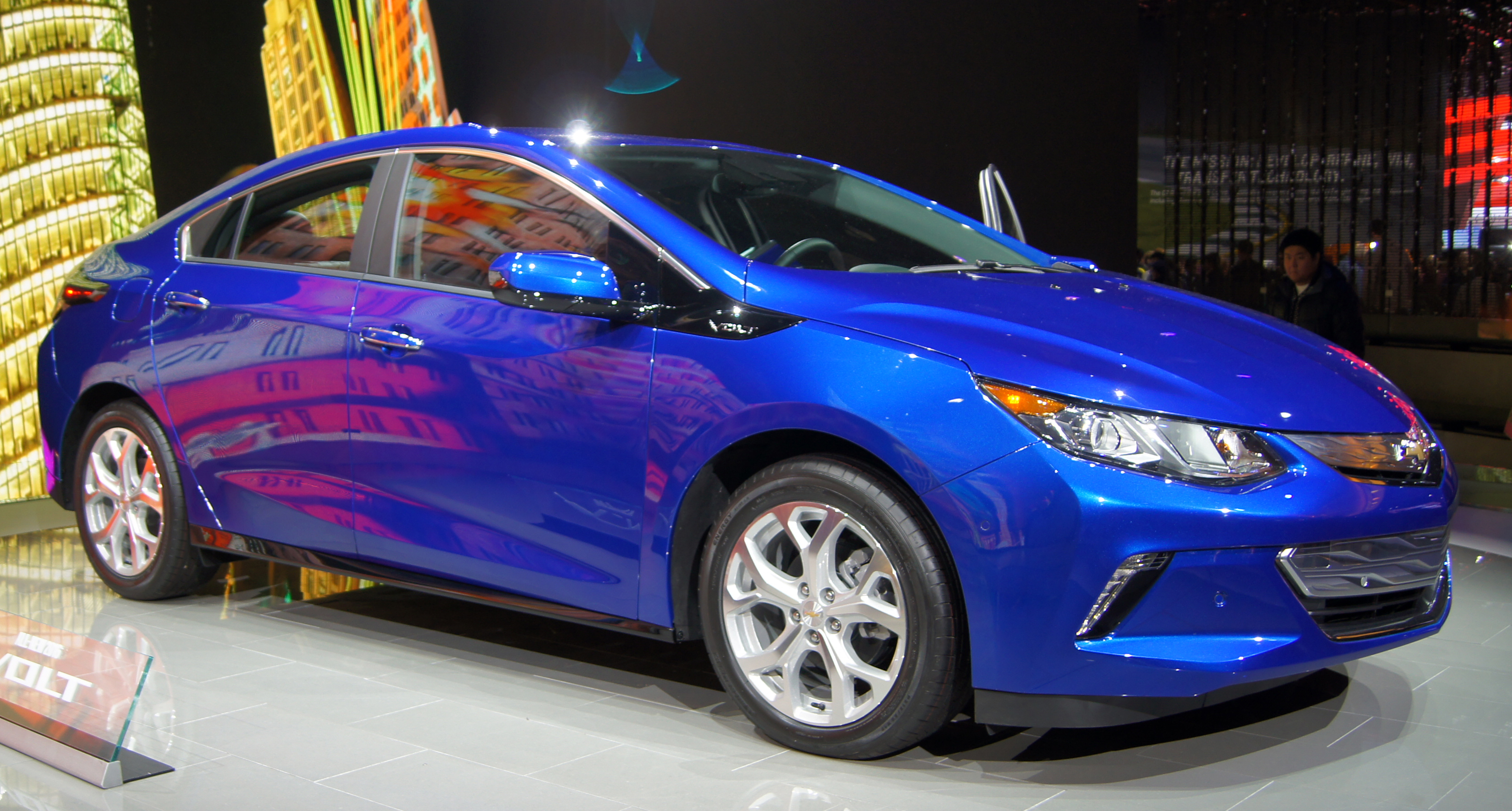
Chevrolet Volt (2nd gen.) plug-in hybrid

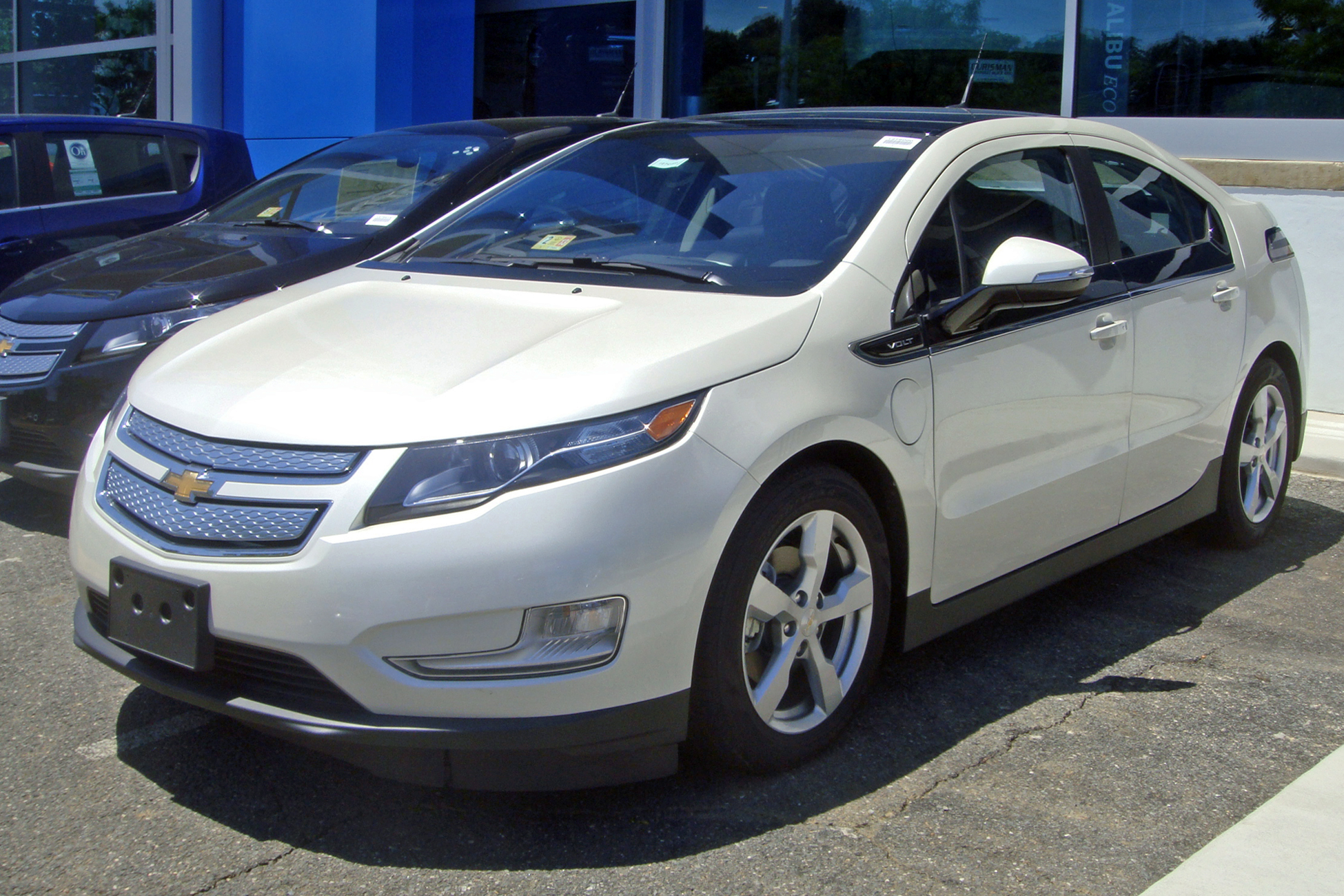
Chevrolet Volt (1st gen) plug-in hybrid

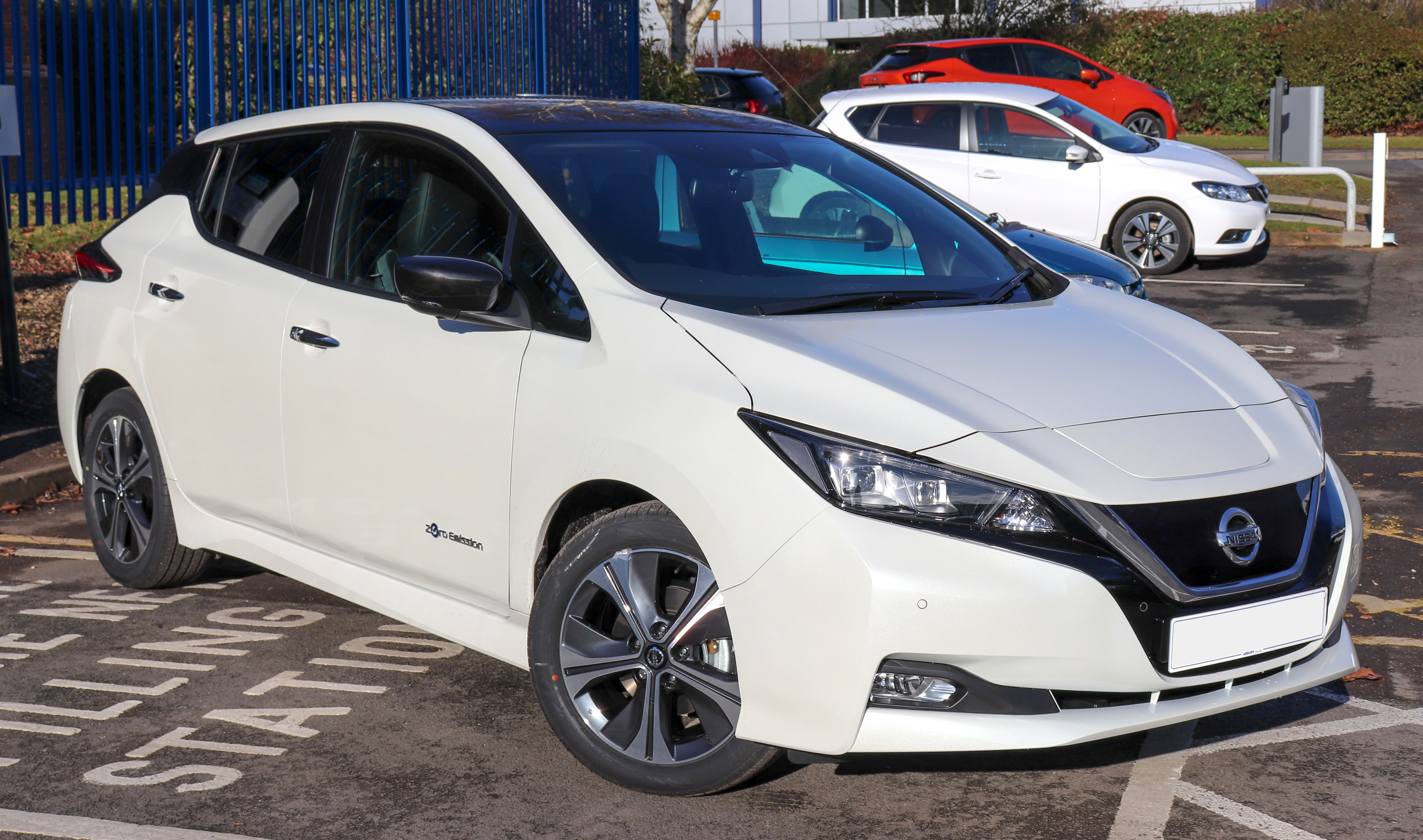
Nissan Leaf electric car

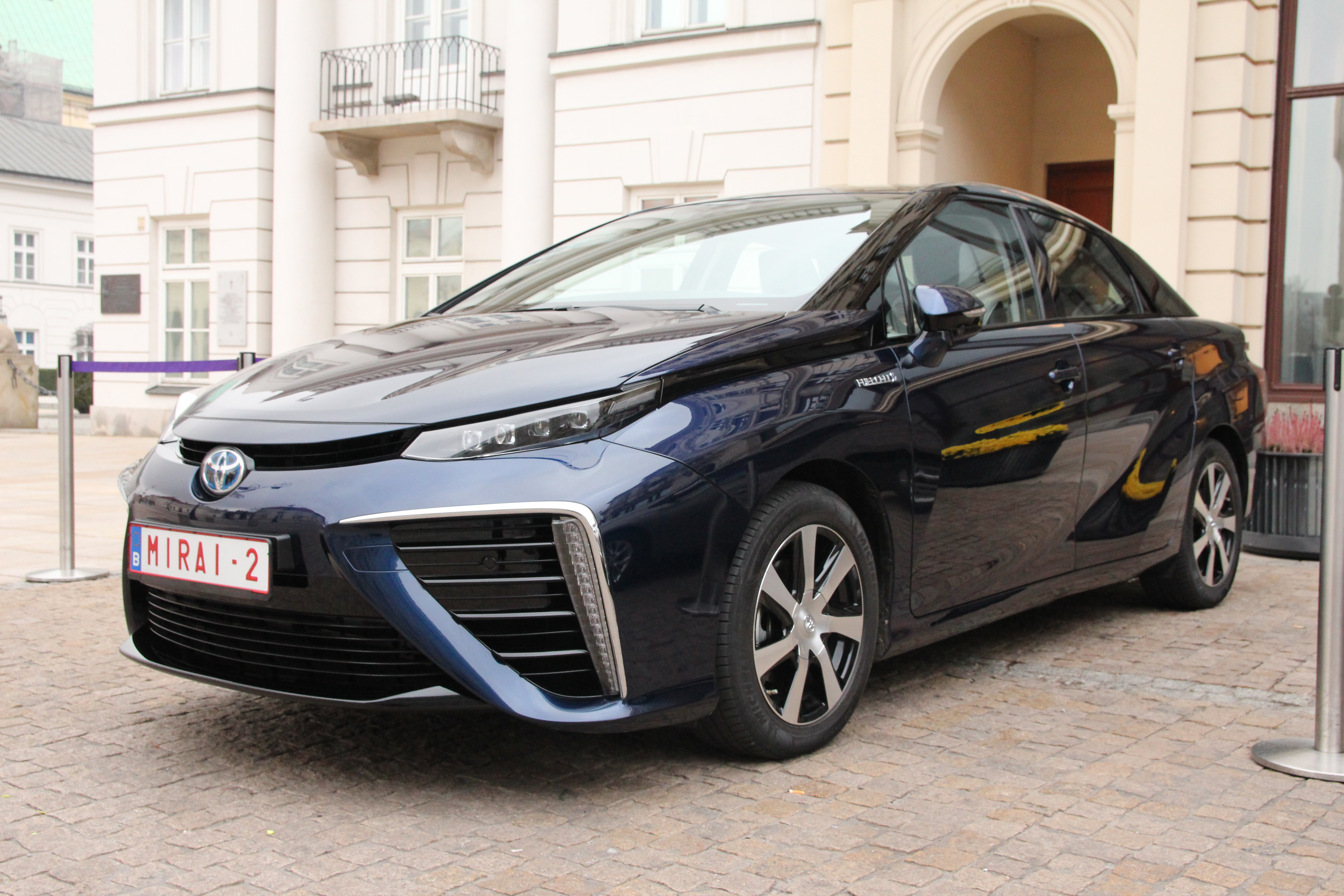
Toyota Mirai hydrogen fuel cell car

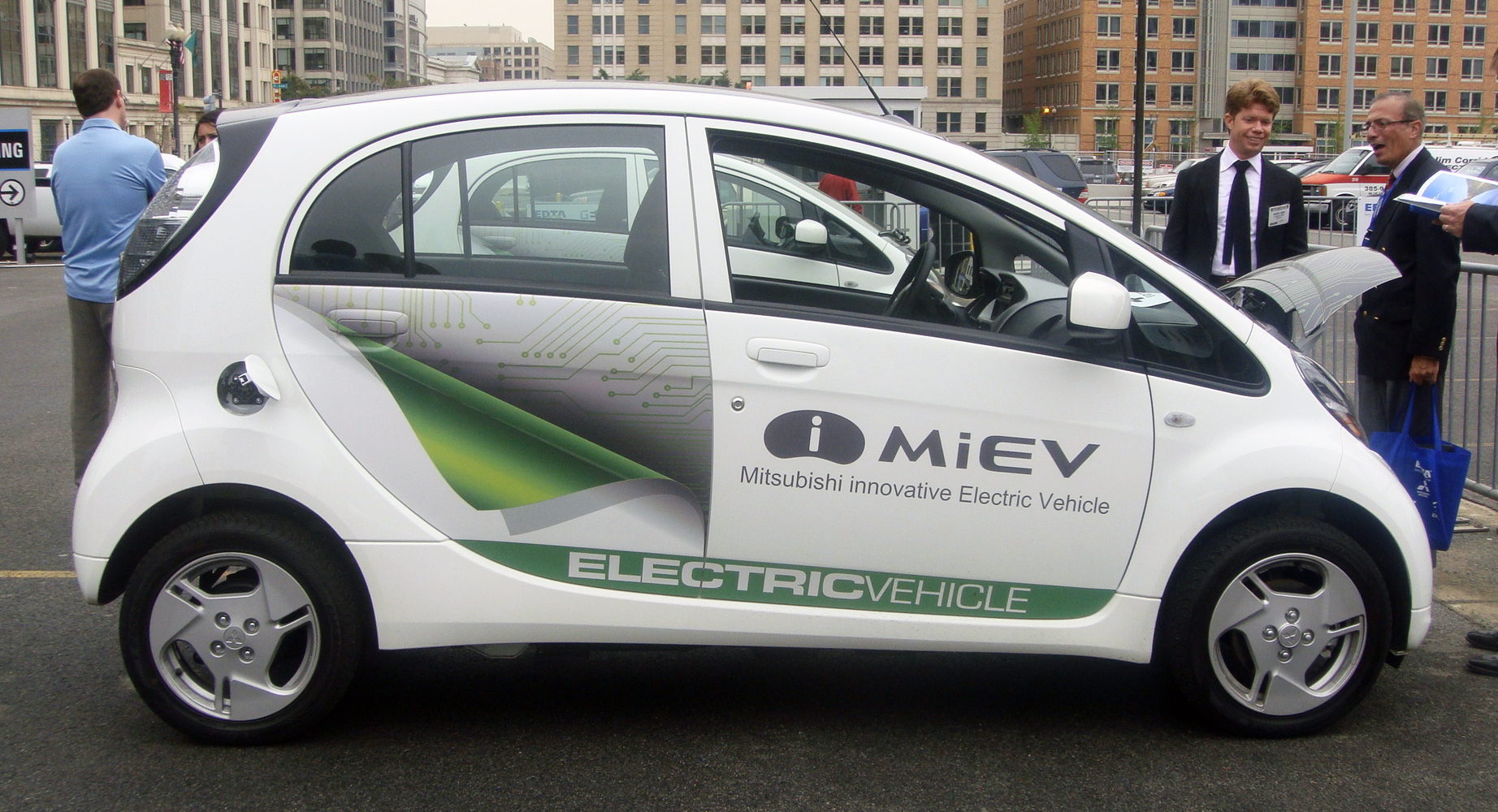
Mitsubishi i-MiEV electric car

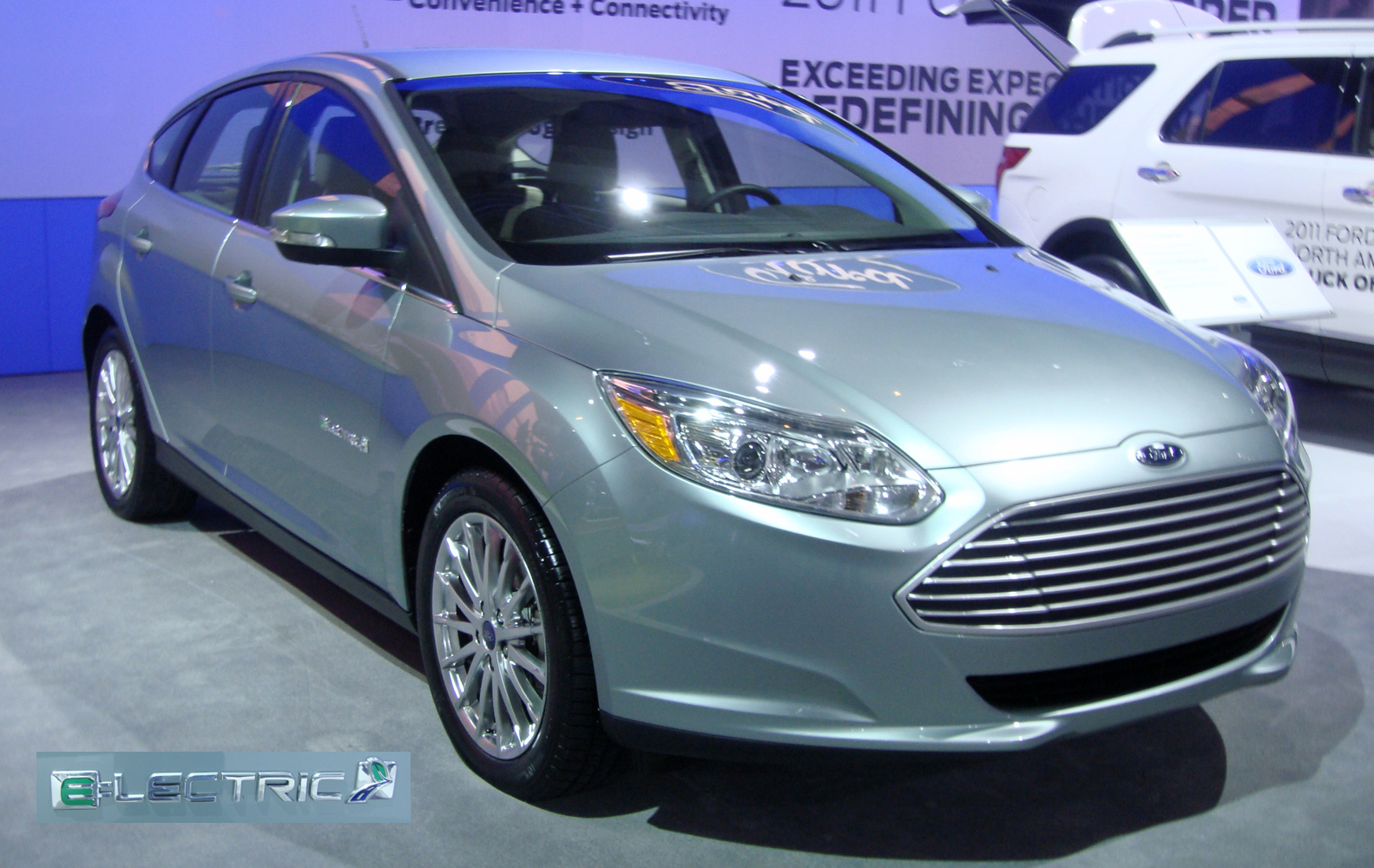
Ford Focus Electric

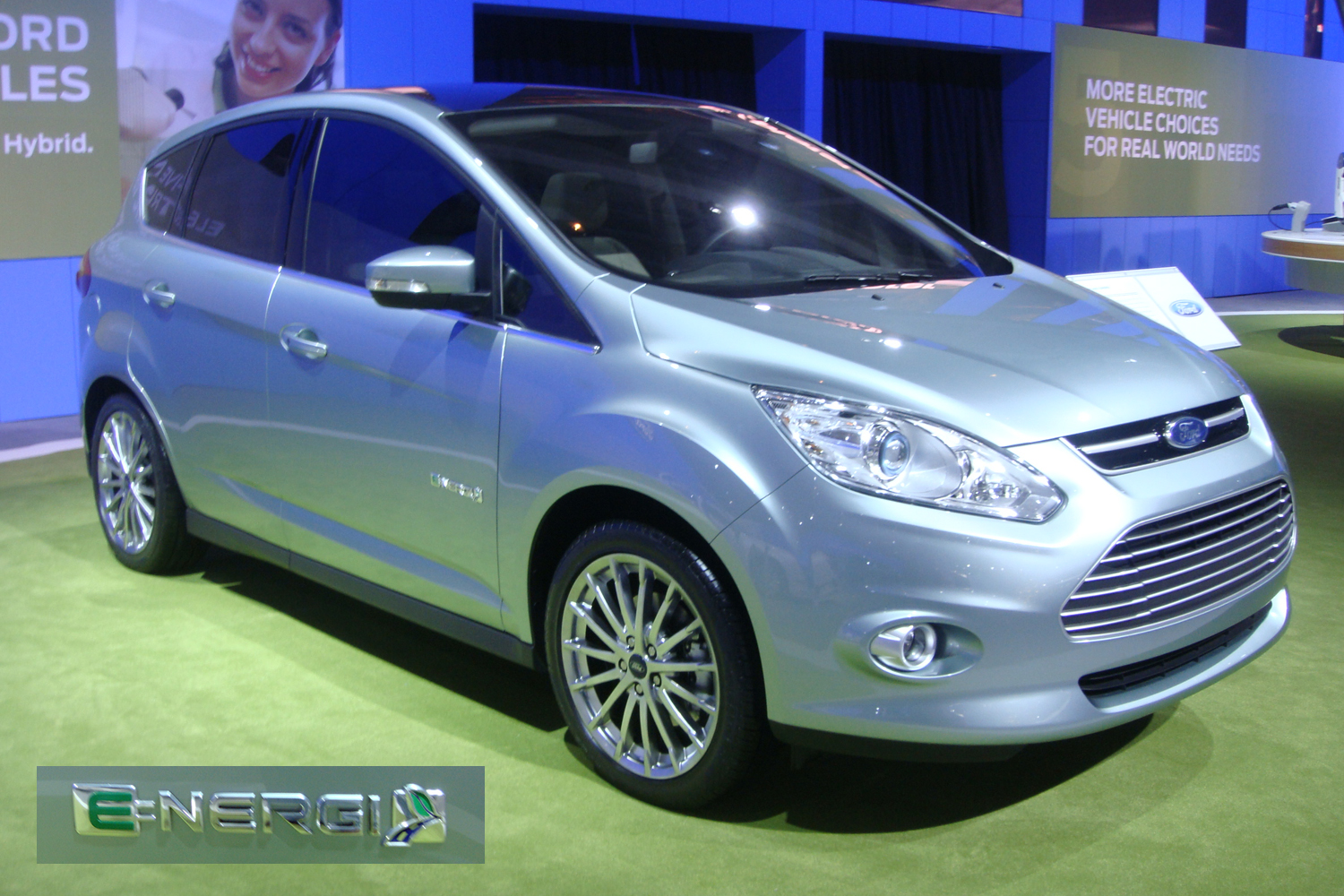
Ford C-Max Energi plug-in hybrid

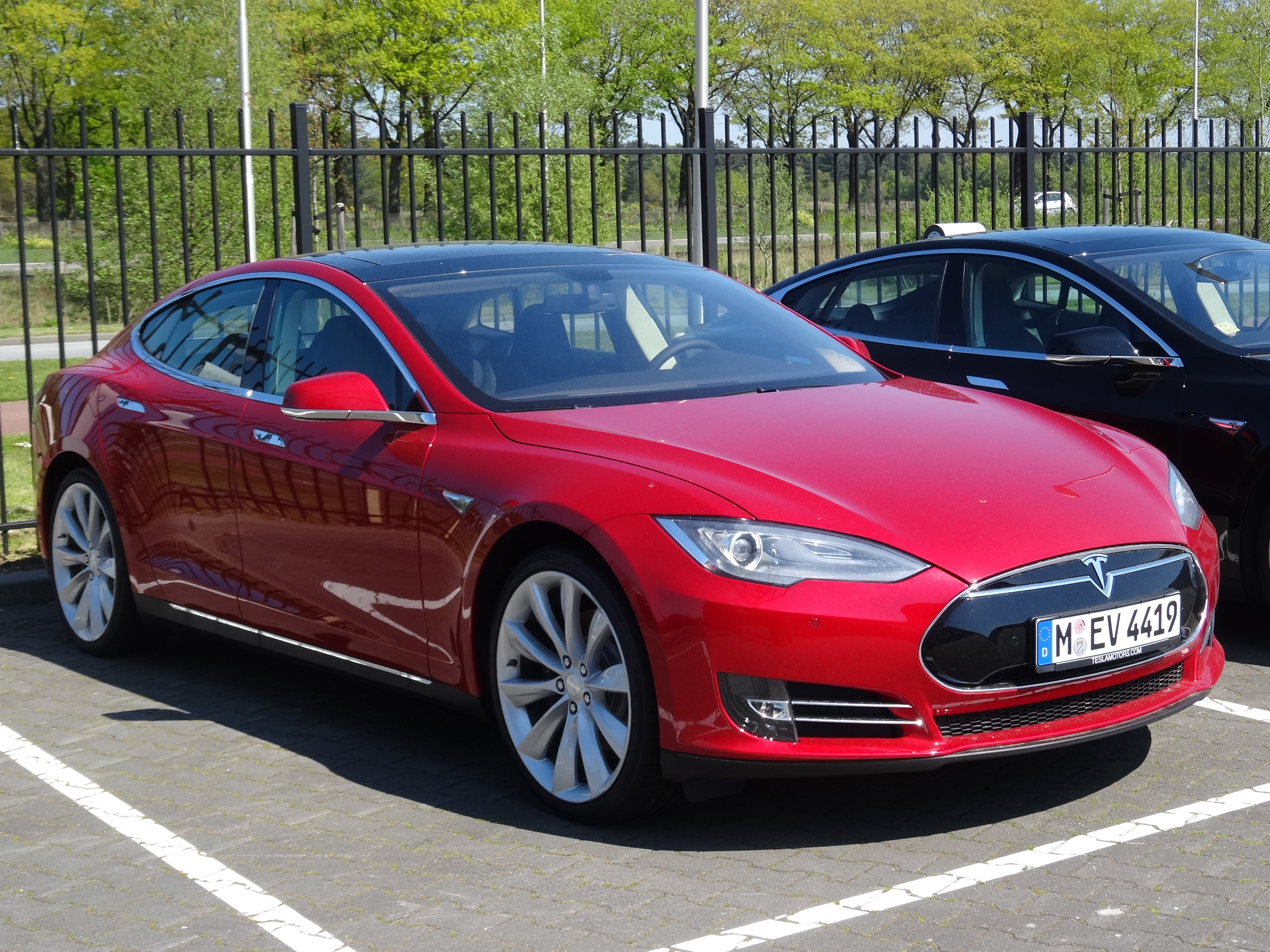
Tesla Model S electric car

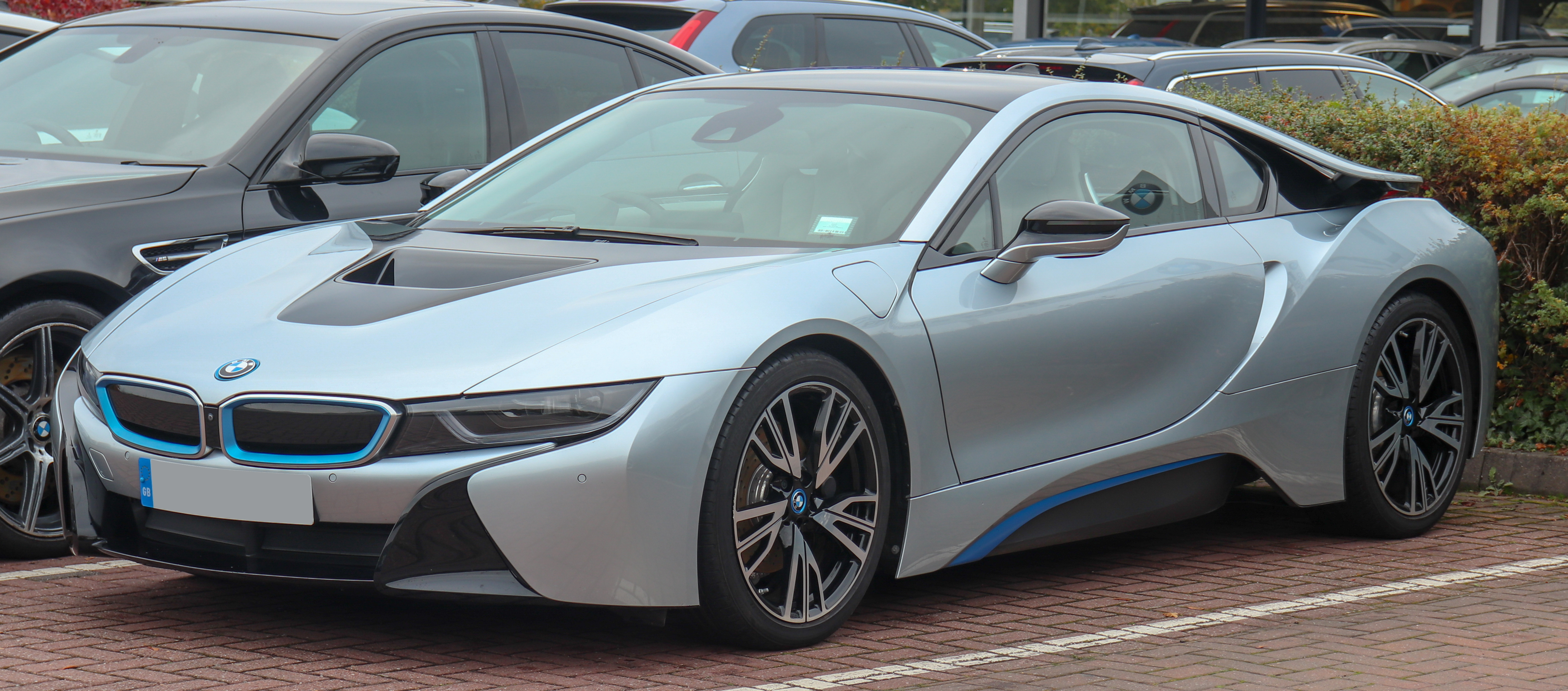
BMW i8 plug-in hybrid

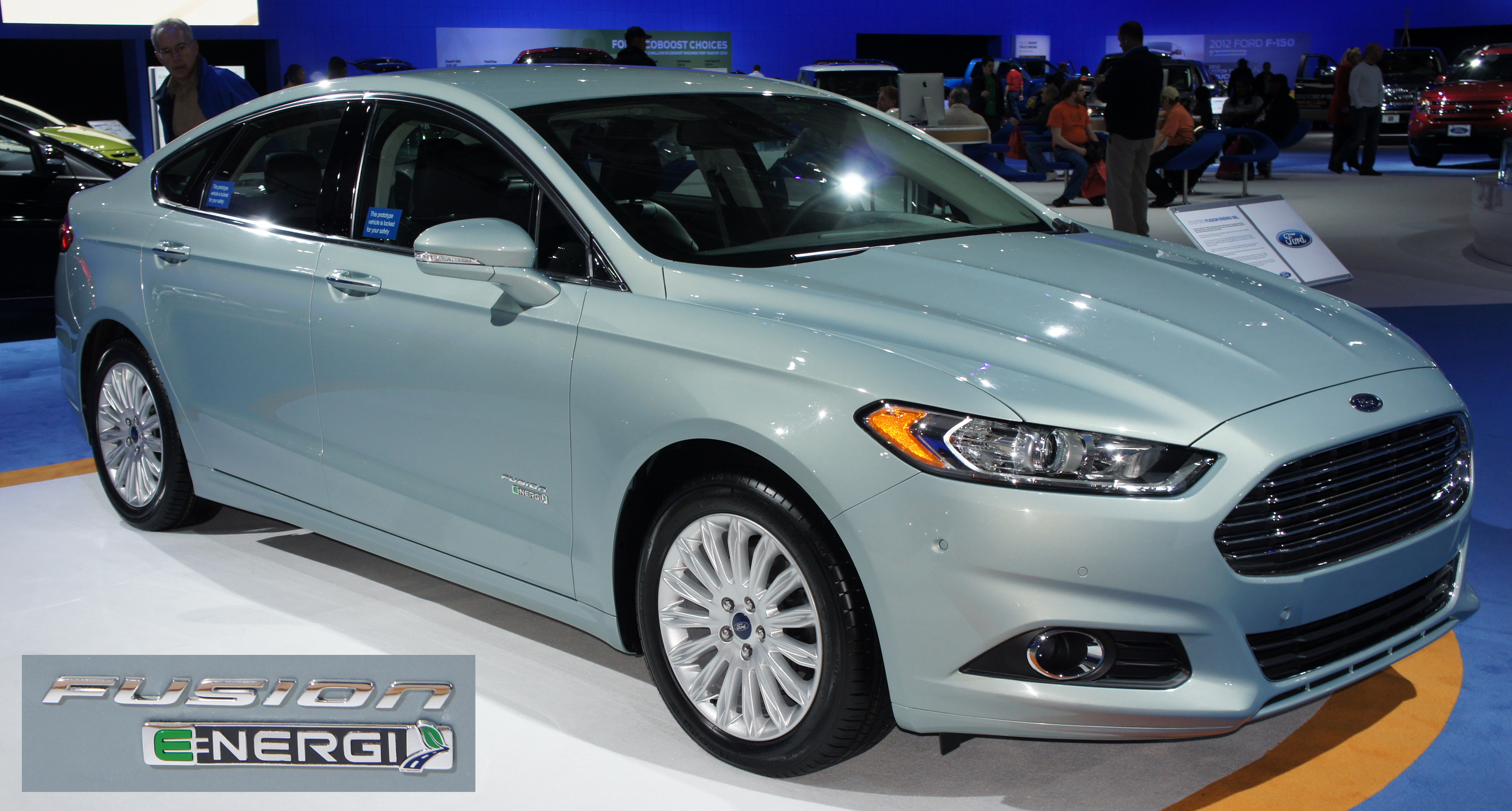
Ford Fusion Energi plug-in hybrid

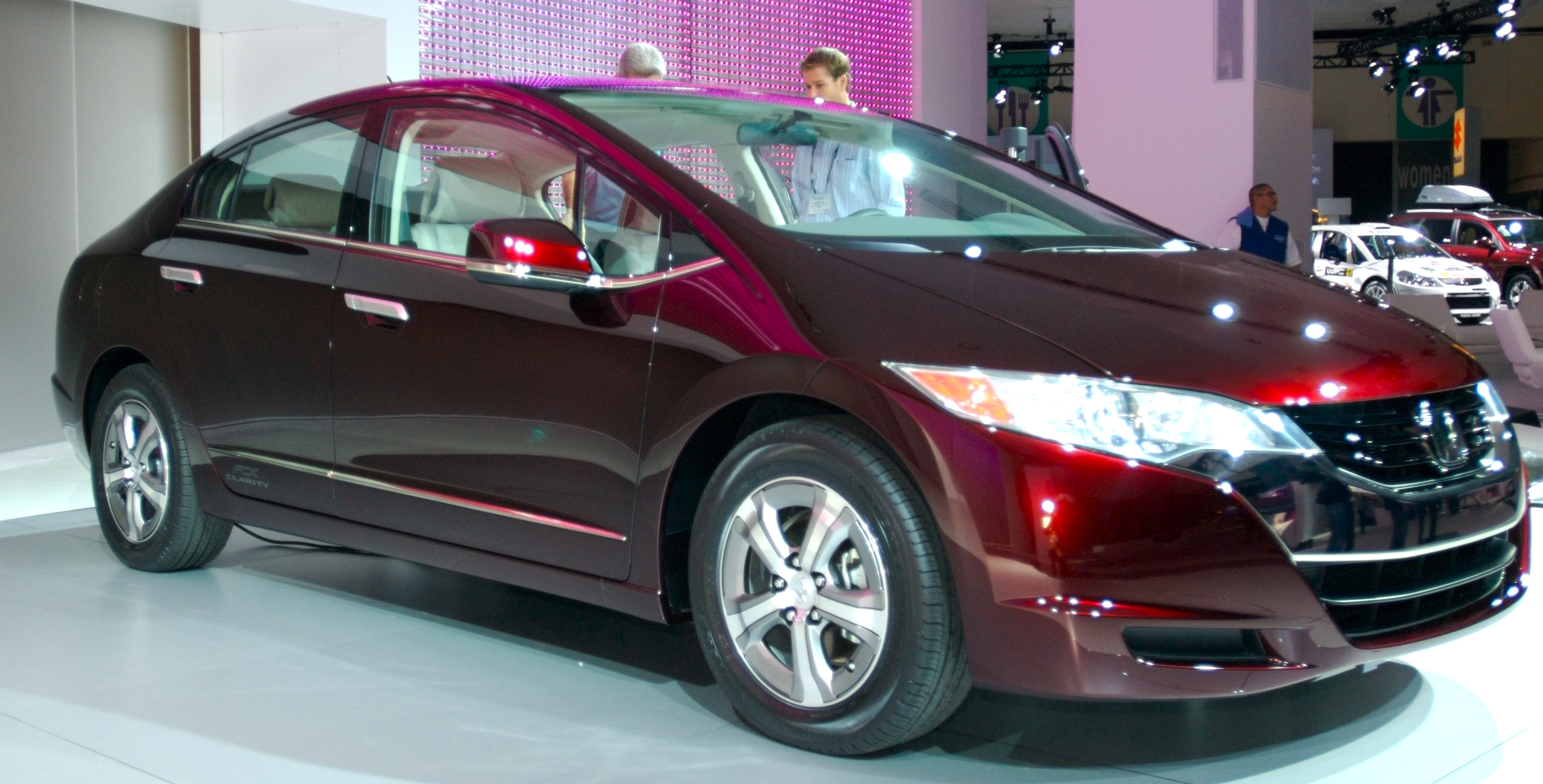
Honda FCX Clarity hydrogen fuel cell car

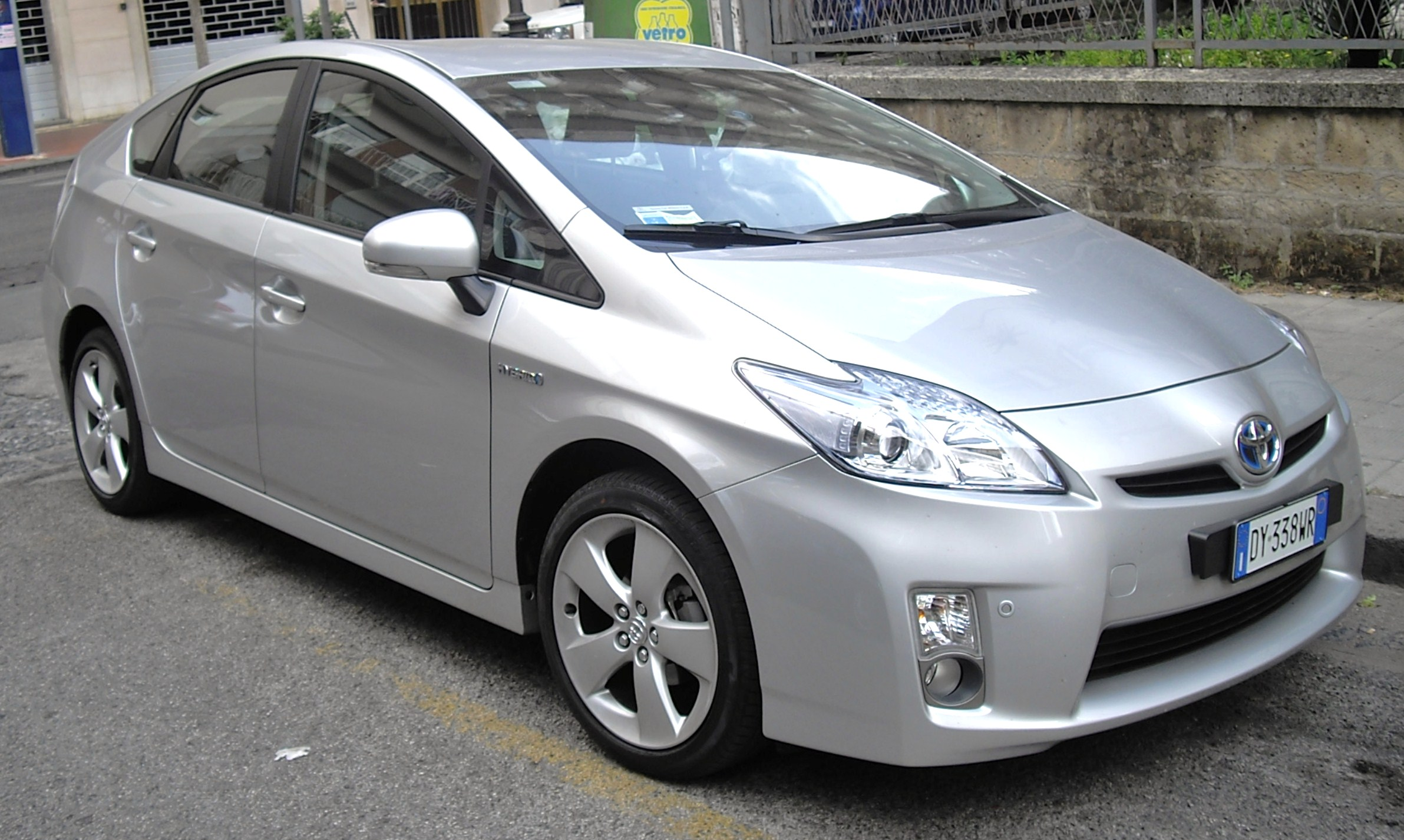
Toyota Prius (3rd gen)

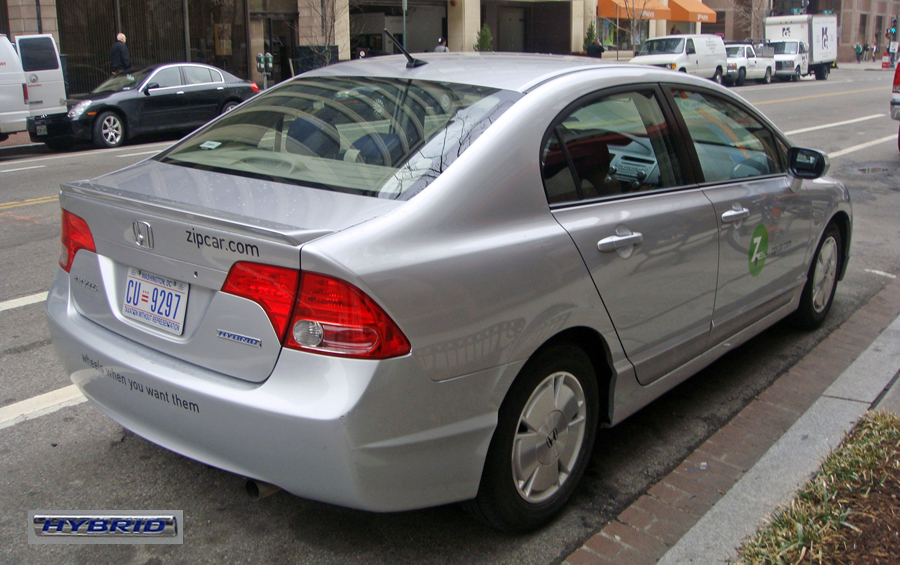
Honda Civic Hybrid (2nd gen)

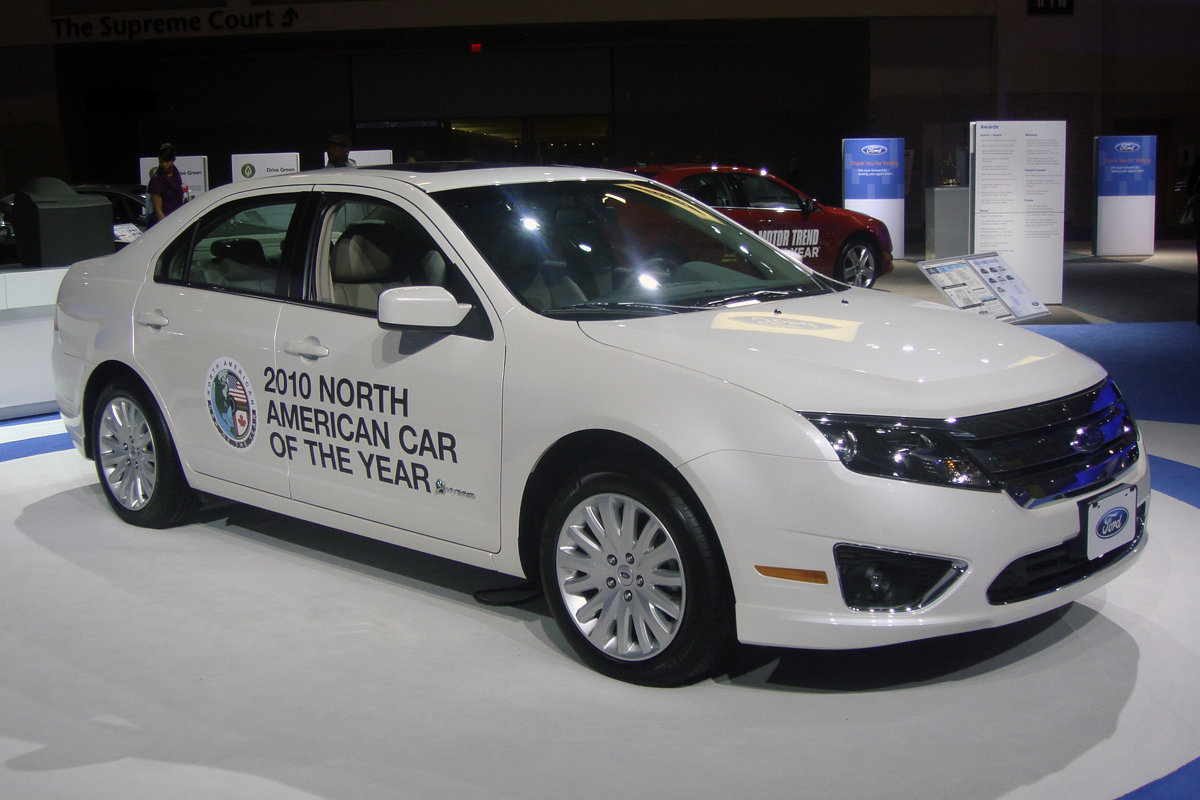
Ford Fusion Hybrid (1st gen)

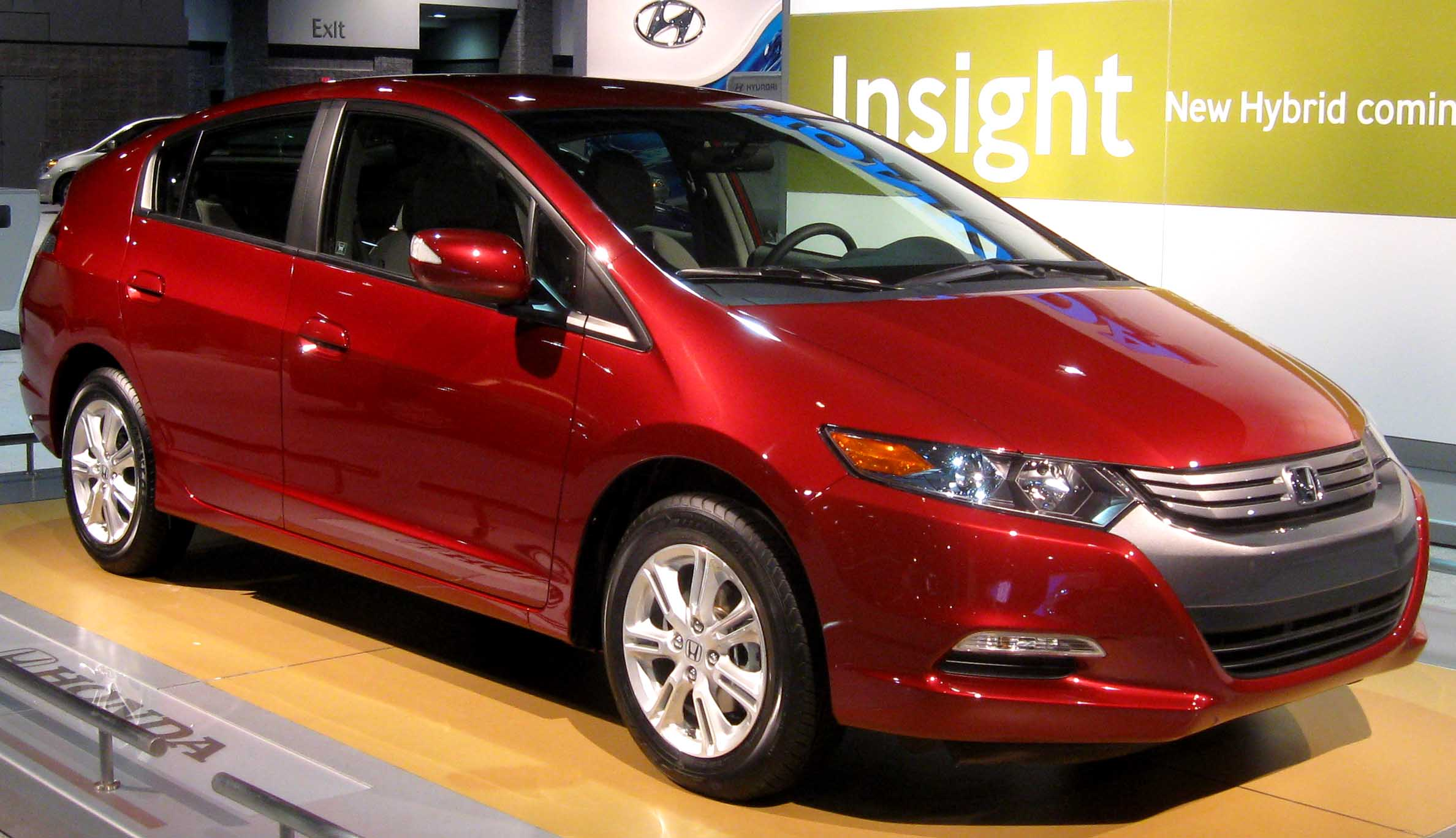
Honda Insight (2nd gen)

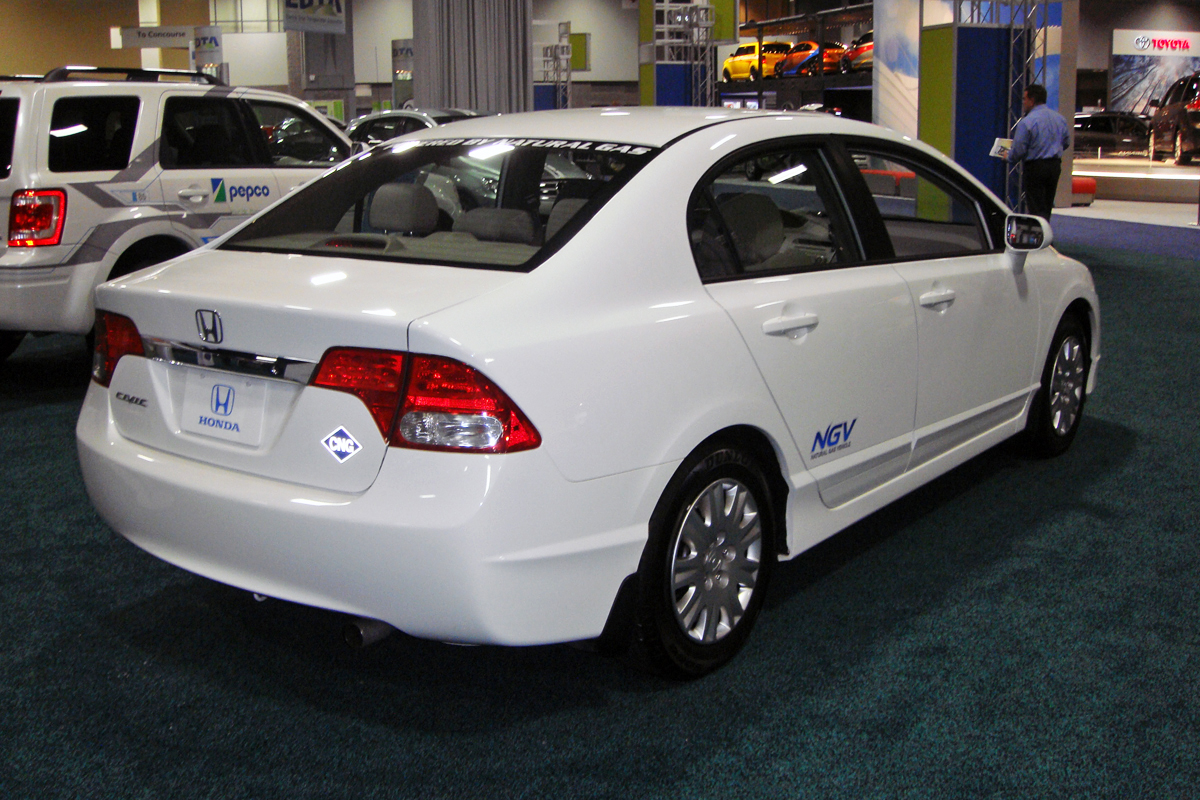
Honda Civic GX

Several automobile magazines, motor vehicle specialized publications and environmental groups publish annual rankings or listings of the best green cars of a given year. The following table presents a selection of the annual top pickings.

Selected annual rankings of green cars
Vehicle	Year model	Type of vehicle/fuel	EPA Combined mileage (mpg)	EPA City mileage (mpg)	EPA Highway mileage (mpg)
Most efficient EPA-certified vehicles based on combined MPG rating
2021 Tesla Model 3 Standard Range Plus RWD— All years, all fuels	2021	Electric car	142 mpg-e	150 mpg-e	133 mpg-e
2022 Tesla Model 3 RWD— Current Year, all fuels	2022	Electric car	132 mpg-e	138 mpg-e	126 mpg-e
2022 Hyundai Ioniq Blue — Current year, gasoline fuel	2022	Hybrid electric	59 mpg	58 mpg	60 mpg
2022 Hyundai Ioniq Blue — All years, gasoline fuel	2022	Hybrid electric	59 mpg	58 mpg	60 mpg
Green Car Journal — Green Car of the Year
Toyota Camry (XV80) — 2025 Award	2025	Hybrid electric	51 mpg	53 mpg	50 mpg
Toyota Prius Prime — 2024 Award	2024	Plug-in hybrid	127 mpg-e	—N/a	—N/a
Toyota Crown — 2023 Award	2023	Hybrid electric	41 mpg	42 mpg	41 mpg
Audi Q4 e-tron — 2022 Award	2022	Electric car	93 mpg-e	97 mpg-e	87 mpg-e
Chevrolet Bolt EV — 2017 Award	2017	Electric car	119 mpg-e	128 mpg-e	110 mpg-e
Chevrolet Volt (second generation) — 2016 Award	2016	Plug-in hybrid	Gas equivalent All-electric mode	Gasoline only mode	All-electric range
Chevrolet Volt (second generation) — 2016 Award	2016	Plug-in hybrid	106 mpg-e	42 mpg	53 mi
BMW i3 — 2015 Award	2014	Electric car	124 mpg-e	137 mpg-e	111 mpg-e
Honda Accord ninth generation line-up — 2014 Award	2014	Gasoline hybrid and plug-in variants	min 29 mpg, hybrid 47 mpg, plug-in 115 mpg-e		
Ford Fusion 2nd gen line-up — 2013 Award	2013	Gasoline, EcoBoost, hybrid and plug-in variants	min 34 mpg, hybrid 47 mpg, plug-in 100 mpg-e		
Honda Civic GX — 2012 Award	2012	Natural gas	28	24	36
Chevrolet Volt — 2011 Award	2011	Plug-in hybrid	Gas equivalent All-electric mode	Gasoline only mode	All-electric range
Chevrolet Volt — 2011 Award	2011	Plug-in hybrid	93 mpg-e	37 mpg	35 mi
Green Car Journal — Green Car Vision Award
Ford C-Max Energi — 2012 Award	2013	Plug-in hybrid	Gas equivalent All-electric mode	Gasoline only mode	All-electric range
Ford C-Max Energi — 2012 Award	2013	Plug-in hybrid	100 mpg-e	43 mpg	20 mi
Ford Focus Electric — 2011 Award	2012	Electric car	Gasoline equivalent fuel economy		All-electric range
Ford Focus Electric — 2011 Award	2012	Electric car	105 mpg-e		100 mi
Nissan Leaf — 2010 Award	2011	Electric car	Gasoline equivalent fuel economy		All-electric range
Nissan Leaf — 2010 Award	2011	Electric car	99 mpg-e		73 mi
Chevrolet Volt — 2009 Award	2011	Plug-in hybrid	Gas equivalent All-electric mode	Gasoline only mode	All-electric range
Chevrolet Volt — 2009 Award	2011	Plug-in hybrid	93 mpg-e	37 mpg	35 mi
World Car of the Year — World Green Car / World Electric Vehicle
World Electric Vehicle (Category replaced World Green Car starting 2022)
Kia EV9 — 2024 Award	2024	Electric car	89 mpg-e	99 mpg-e	80 mpg-e
Hyundai Ioniq 6 — 2023 Award	2023	Electric car	140 mpg-e	153 mpg-e	127 mpg-e
Hyundai Ioniq 5 — 2022 Award	2022	Electric car	114 mpg-e	132 mpg-e	98 mpg-e
World Green Car (Category discontinued after 2019)
Jaguar I-Pace — 2019 Award	2019	Electric car	76 mpg-e	80 mpg-e	72 mpg-e
Nissan Leaf (2nd gen) — 2018 Award	2018	Electric car	112 mpg-e	125 mpg-e	100 mpg-e
Toyota Prius Prime — 2017 Award	2017	Plug-in hybrid	133 mpg-e	—N/a	—N/a
Toyota Mirai — 2016 Award	2016	Hydrogen fuel cell	66 mpg-e	66 mpg-e	66 mpg-e
BMW i8 — 2015 Award	2015	Plug-in hybrid	Gas equivalent All-electric mode	Gasoline only mode	All-electric range
BMW i8 — 2015 Award	2015	Plug-in hybrid	76 mpg-e	28 mpg	15 mi
BMW i3 — 2014 Award	2014	Electric car	Gasoline equivalent fuel economy		All-electric range
BMW i3 — 2014 Award	2014	Electric car	124 mpg-e		81 mi
Tesla Model S — 2013 Award	2013	Electric car (60/85 kWh battery)	Gasoline equivalent fuel economy		All-electric range
Tesla Model S — 2013 Award	2013	Electric car (60/85 kWh battery)	95/89 mpg-e		208/265 mi
Mercedes-Benz S 250 CDI BlueEFFICIENCY — 2012 Award	2012	Clean diesel	5.7 L/100 km (50 mpg_{‑imp}; 41 mpg_{‑US})		
Chevrolet Volt — 2011 Award	2011	Plug-in hybrid	Gas equivalent All-electric mode	Gasoline only mode	All-electric range
Chevrolet Volt — 2011 Award	2011	Plug-in hybrid	93 mpg-e	37 mpg	35 mi
Volkswagen BlueMotion — 2010 Award (Golf, Passat, Polo)	2010	Clean diesel	—N/a	—N/a	—N/a
Honda FCX Clarity — 2009 Award (miles per kilogram of hydrogen)	2009	Hydrogen fuel cell	59 mpg-e	58 mpg-e	60 mpg-e
Consumer Reports Top Picks: Green Car Category
Tesla Model S — Best overall model 2014	2014	Electric car (60/85 kWh battery)	Gasoline equivalent fuel economy		All-electric range
Tesla Model S — Best overall model 2014	2014	Electric car (60/85 kWh battery)	95/89 mpg-e		208/265 mi
Toyota Prius — Best green car 2014	2014	Hybrid electric	50	51	48
Toyota Prius — Best green car 2013	2013	Hybrid electric	50	51	48
Toyota Prius — Best green car 2012	2012	Hybrid electric	50	51	48
Toyota Prius — Best green car 2011	2011	Hybrid electric	50	51	48
Toyota Prius — Best green car 2010	2010	Hybrid electric	50	51	48
Toyota Prius — Best green car 2009	2009	Hybrid electric	46	48	45
Consumer Reports American Top Picks: Green Car Category
Ford Fusion Hybrid — Top Pick 2011	2011	Hybrid electric	39	41	36
Ford Fusion Hybrid — Top Pick 2010	2010	Hybrid electric	39	41	36
Ford Escape Hybrid — Top Pick 2009	2009	Hybrid electric	32	34	31
What Car? Green Awards
BMW 320d Efficient Dynamics — Overall Winner 2012	2012	Clean diesel	UK combined 56 mpg_{‑imp} (5.0 L/100 km; 47 mpg_{‑US})		
Vauxhall Ampera — Overall Winner 2011	2012	Plug-in hybrid	EC combined 235.4 mpg_{‑imp} (1.200 L/100 km; 196.0 mpg_{‑US})		
Toyota Auris Hybrid — Overall Winner 2010	2010	Hybrid electric	UK combined 74 mpg_{‑imp} (3.8 L/100 km; 62 mpg_{‑US})		
Volvo S40 1.6D DRIVe S — Overall Winner 2009	2009	Clean diesel	UK combined 60 mpg_{‑imp} (4.7 L/100 km; 50 mpg_{‑US})		
Ford Focus 1.6 TDCi Style — Overall Winner 2008	2008	Clean diesel	UK combined 52 mpg_{‑imp} (5.4 L/100 km; 43 mpg_{‑US})		
Mother Earth News Best Green Cars
Best Green Cars of 2011
Chevrolet Volt	2011	Plug-in hybrid	Gas equivalent All-electric mode	Gasoline only mode	All-electric range
Chevrolet Volt	2011	Plug-in hybrid	93 mpg-e	37 mpg	35 mi
Nissan Leaf	2011	Electric car	Gasoline equivalent fuel economy		All-electric range
Nissan Leaf	2011	Electric car	99 mpg-e		73 mi
Toyota Prius	2011	Hybrid electric	50	51	48
Ford Fiesta	2011	Gasoline	33	29	38
Honda CR-Z CVT	2011	Hybrid electric	37	35	39
VW Jetta TDI	2011	Clean diesel	34	30	42
Best Green Cars of 2010
Ford Fusion Hybrid	2010	Hybrid electric	39	41	36
Honda Civic Hybrid	2010	Hybrid electric	42	40	45
Honda Insight	2010	Hybrid electric	41	40	43
Toyota Prius	2010	Hybrid electric	50	51	48
VW Golf TDI	2010	Clean diesel	34	30	42
VW Jetta TDI	2010	Clean diesel	41	40	43
American Council for an Energy-Efficient Economy Greenest Vehicles of the Year
Greenest Vehicles of 2012 (Top 5)
Mitsubishi i-MiEV	2012	Electric car	112 mpg-e	3.8 mile/Kwh	2.9 mile/Kwh
Honda Civic GX	2012	Natural gas	-	27mpg-e	38 mpg-e
Nissan Leaf	2012	Electric car	99 mpg-e	3.1 mile/Kwh	2.7 mile/Kwh
Toyota Prius	2012	Hybrid electric	50	51	48
Honda Insight	2012	Hybrid electric	42	41	44
Greenest Vehicles of 2011 (Top 5)
Honda Civic GX	2011	Natural gas	28	24	36
Nissan Leaf	2011	Electric car	99 mpg-e	3.15 mile/Kwh	2.72 mile/Kwh
Smart fortwo (Cabriolet/Coupe)	2011	Gasoline	36	33	41
Toyota Prius	2011	Hybrid electric	50	51	48
Honda Civic Hybrid	2011	Hybrid electric	41	40	43
Greenest Vehicles of 2010 (Top 5)
Honda Civic GX	2010	Natural gas	28	24	36
Toyota Prius	2010	Hybrid electric	50	51	48
Honda Civic Hybrid	2010	Hybrid electric	42	40	45
Smart fortwo (Convertible/coupe)	2010	Gasoline	36	33	41
Honda Insight	2010	Hybrid electric	41	40	43
Kelley Blue Book Top 10 Green Cars
Top 10 Green Cars of 2014 (Top 5)
BMW i3	2014	Electric car	Gasoline equivalent fuel economy		All-electric range
BMW i3	2014	Electric car	124 mpg-e		81 mi
Nissan Leaf	2014	Electric car	Gasoline equivalent fuel economy		All-electric range
Nissan Leaf	2014	Electric car	99 mpg-e		73 mi
Toyota Prius	2014	Hybrid electric	50	51	48
Tesla Model S	2014	Electric car (60/85 kWh battery)	Gasoline equivalent fuel economy		All-electric range
Tesla Model S	2014	Electric car (60/85 kWh battery)	95/89 mpg-e		208/265 mi
Honda Accord Hybrid	2014	Hybrid electric	47	50	45
Top 10 Green Cars of 2011 (Top 3)
Nissan Leaf	2011	Electric car	Gasoline equivalent fuel economy		All-electric range
Nissan Leaf	2011	Electric car	99 mpg-e		73 mi
Chevrolet Volt	2011	Plug-in hybrid	Gasoline equivalent fuel economy		All-electric range
Chevrolet Volt	2011	Plug-in hybrid	93 mpg-e		35 mi
Toyota Prius	2011	Hybrid electric	50	51	48
Top 10 Green Cars of 2010 (Top 3)
Toyota Prius	2010	Hybrid electric	50	51	48
Honda Insight	2010	Hybrid electric	41	40	43
Ford Fusion Hybrid	2010	Hybrid electric	39	41	36

== Electric vehicle motor shows ==
Dedicated electric and green vehicle motor shows:

- Alternative Vehicle and Fuel Show (AVFS), Fair of Valladolid, Spain, in November.
- Green Fleet Expo, Royal Botanical Gardens (Ontario), in May.
- Green-Car-Guide Live!, Arena and Convention Centre in Liverpool, in June
- Electric & Hybrid Vehicle Technology Expo, (Sindelfingen, Germany, April / Novi, Detroit, Michigan, September).
- European Electric Motor Show, Helsinki Exhibition & Convention Centre, in November

== See also ==
- Alternative fuel vehicle – Vehicle not powered by petrol or diesel
- Alternatives to the automobile – Transport modes other than cars or trucks
- Better Place – American electric car battery charging company
- Emerging technologies – Technology still to be fully developed - e.g. new green vehicle methods
- Green transport hierarchy – Prioritising vulnerable sustainable road users
- Green tuning – Tuning of cars to reduce energy consumption
- Michelin Green X Challenge – Auto racing championship in the United States
- Government incentives for plug-in electric vehicles
- Hybrid taxi – Taxicab service provided with a hybrid electric cars
- Union of Concerned Scientists' Hybrid Scorecard – Ranking method for hybrid electric vehicles
- Low-carbon fuel standard – Rule to reduce carbon intensity of transportation fuels
- Miles per gallon gasoline equivalent – Measurement of fuel economy
- Mobile source air pollution – Air pollution emitted by motor vehicles, airplanes, locomotives, and other engines
  - Exhaust gas – Gases emitted as a result of fuel reactions in combustion engines
- Motorised quadricycle – EU vehicle category for four-wheeled microcars
- Plug-in electric vehicle – Type of vehicles
- Progressive Insurance Automotive X Prize
- Wind-assisted propulsion – System for generating thrust for watercraft
- Wind-powered vehicle – Vehicle propelled by wind
- Zero-emissions vehicle – Class of motor vehicle
