= Environmental impact-minimizing vehicle tuning =

Tuning of cars to reduce energy consumption

Environmental impact-minimizing vehicle tuning is the modification (or tuning) of cars to reduce energy consumption.

== General tuning ==
- Hybridization: change to a hybrid electric vehicle. One can use an aftermarket kit for the powertrain or use a hybrid adapter trailer.
- Modifying key engine-selection parameters in the Battery Management System of a hybrid vehicle. Vehicles as mild hybrids have a parameter for the threshold speed on which the vehicle is to switch from electric propulsion to the internal combustion engine. Introducing a higher speed as a parameter can reduce emissions and increase fuel efficiency (although it may increase strain on the battery).
- Pluginization of hybrid or electric vehicles. A plug-in hybrid electric vehicle (PHEV) is a hybrid which has additional battery capacity and the ability to be recharged from an external electrical outlet. A plug-in electric vehicle is basically the same, without an extra internal combustion engine. In addition, modifications are made to the vehicle's control software. The vehicle can be used for short trips of moderate speed without needing the internal combustion engine (ICE) component of the vehicle, thereby saving fuel costs. In this mode of operation the vehicle operates as a pure battery electric vehicle with a weight penalty (the ICE). The long range and additional power of the ICE power train is available when needed.
- Electric vehicle conversion. An electric vehicle conversion is the modification of a conventional internal combustion engine (ICE) driven vehicle to battery electric propulsion, creating a battery electric vehicle. In some cases the vehicle may be built by the converter, or assembled from a kit car. In some countries, the user can choose to buy a converted vehicle of any model in the automaker dealerships only paying the cost of the batteries and motor, with no installation costs (it is called preconversion or previous conversion).
- Modifying the engine to run an alternative fuel. These include natural gas conversion of gasoline-powered cars and Vegetable oil conversion of diesel cars. Cars with Diesel engines can be converted reasonably cheaply and easily to run on 100% vegetable oil. Vegetable oil is often cheaper and cleaner than petrodiesel, but local laws often levy harsh fines to users who fail to pay fuel taxes when acquiring their fuel outside regular distribution channels. Liquid nitrogen, Hydrogen fuel conversions and Ethanol conversions are other alternative fuel conversions that can be done with internal combustion engines. The first two will eliminate all vehicle emissions, while the third one will only slightly decrease emissions.
- Replacing the internal combustion engine of a hybrid vehicle with a hydrogen fuel cell to make the vehicle completely emissionless; even in recharging mode.
- Adding a hydrogen fuel cell to a battery electric vehicle to increase its driving range.
- Adding more electric batteries to a battery electric vehicle to increase driving range. Besides placing more batteries, this operation often requires additional modification of the Battery Management System.

== See also ==
- Green vehicle, environmentally friendly vehicle
- Vehicle glider, vehicle sold without a powertrain
