= Helsinki Motor Show =

Annual national car show in Finland

Coordinates: 60°12′11″N 24°56′09″E

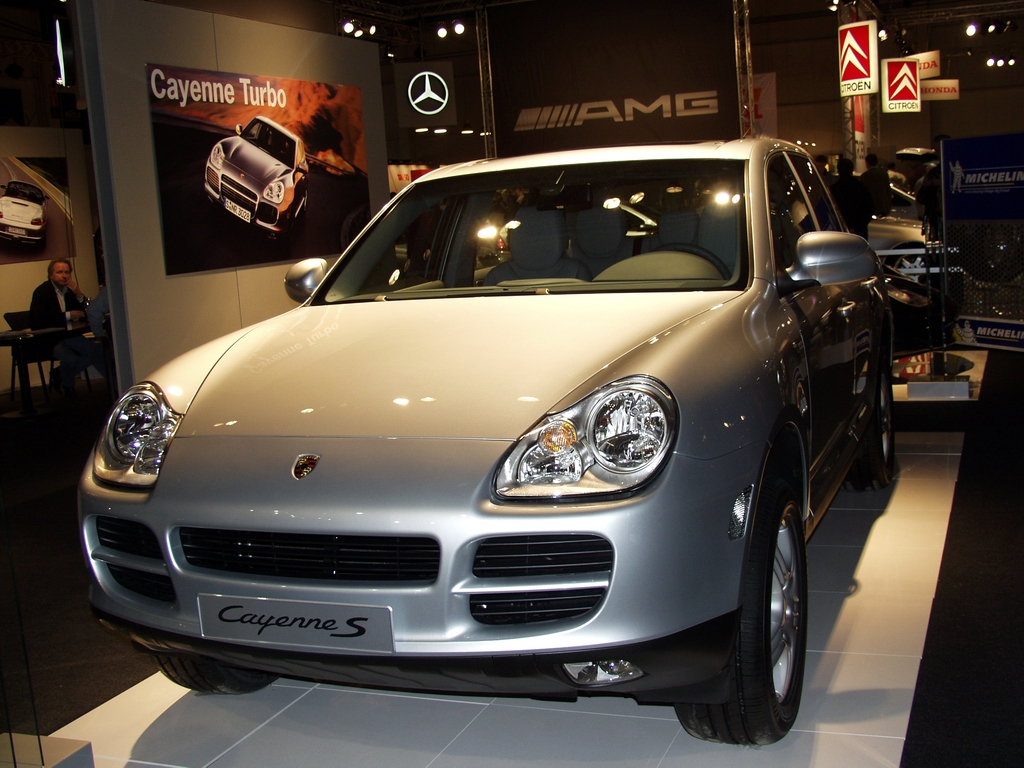
Porsche Cayenne at 2002 Helsinki Motor Show.

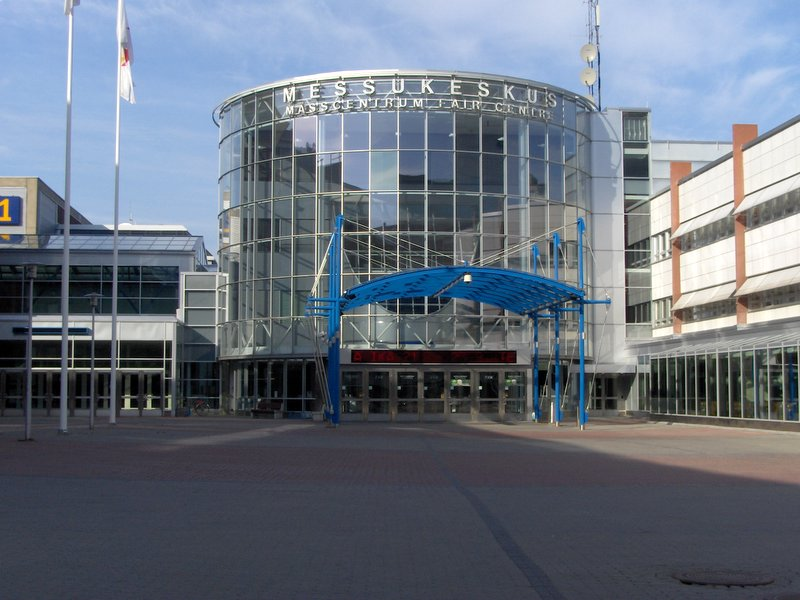
Helsinki Fair Centre, the location of the Helsinki Motor Show.

Helsinki Motor Show (HMS) is an annual national car show in Helsinki, Finland. It is organized around November to December and it has been held in the Helsinki Fair Center. It is the only annual motor show in the Nordic countries.

In the beginning, HMS was a show based on motor sports but gradually more and more upcoming cars have been shown there. Most of the Finnish car importers are present. The event is organized by Team Nykopp Ltd.

The show has attracted around 50,000 visitors each year. The HMS was organized for the 11th time in 2006 and it had 55,000 visitors. A visitor record was made in 2003 with 57,000 visitors.

The 2008-2011 shows have been cancelled due to economic downturn.

== HMS 2005 ==
In the year 2005, over 30 car models were introduced for the first time in Finland. These cars had their world premiers in other international car shows like the International Motor Show Germany in Frankfurt.

== HMS 2006 ==
Among the 20–30 car introductions made for the Finnish market was the Mercedes Benz C 63 AMG.

== Electric Motor Show ==
Electric Motor Show

The Electric Motor Show, which is held in November, is an exhibition of electric cars, motorcycles and scooters as well as of electrically powered mopeds and microcars. The Electric Motor Show is Europe’s first exhibition event that focuses solely on electrically powered vehicles.

=== EMS 2009 ===
The Electric Motor Show kicks off making its proud world debut will be the eCorolla built by the Finnish open source project called eCars-Now! using quality components and lithium batteries. The car is powered by an Azure Dynamics AC motor and controller . The lithium batteries are from Thunder Sky and the car uses a battery management system (BMS) by Lithium Balance. Being open source, the eCars-Now! website offers complete instructions on how to make your own eCorolla (or eJetta or what have you), as well as much other EV info, and encourages everyone to give it a go.
