= Anthony Beale =

American politician

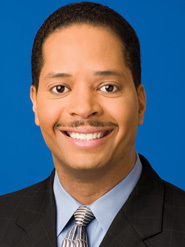
- Official portrait, 2012

Member of the Chicago City Council from the 9th ward
- Incumbent
- Assumed office May 3, 1999
- Preceded by: Melvin Powell Sr.

Personal details
- Born: October 22, 1967 (age 58) Chicago, Illinois, U.S.
- Party: Democratic
- Spouse: Dana Beale
- Children: 3
- Education: Blackburn College
- Website: Official website

Anthony A. Beale (born October 22, 1967) is an American politician and the alderman of the 9th ward of the City of Chicago, Illinois United States. Beale is noted as having been one of the youngest members to serve as elected official on the City of Chicago's City Council. Beale was first elected in 1999. In 2023 Beale was elected to his seventh term in office. In 2013, Beale was an unsuccessful candidate in the Democratic primary for the special election to replace Jesse Jackson Jr. as U.S. Congressman from Illinois' 2nd congressional district.

== Education ==
Beale attended Corliss High School, graduating in 1985. Beale later attended Blackburn College.

Beale worked as a computer data analyst. He was also a community activist under Jesse Jackson Jr. and James Meeks. Beale supported an effort in 1999 to adopt dry laws in some precincts of the 9th ward.

== Aldermanic career ==
Beale was elected alderman for the 9th ward in 1999. He has been reelected in 2003, 2007, 2011, 2015, 2019, and 2023.

In his 1999 victory, backed by Jesse Jackson Jr. and James Meeks, he defeated Herbert Shaw, the son of Robert Shaw, who had vacated the 9th ward seat himself months earlier after being elected to serve on the Cook County Board of Review. Beale's 1999 victory was considered an upset.

Beale was part of a backroom deal to bring additional Walmart locations to Chicago.

Beale proposed using taxpayer money to hire private security patrols for commercial districts.

Beale was previously Chairman of the Committee on Transportation & Infrastructure. As of 2011, he was a member of the following City Council Committees:

- Budget & Government Operations
- Rules and Ethics
- Workforce Development & Audit
- Education & Child Development
- Finance
- Public Safety

During his tenure as Alderman, Beale has focused on job creation and housing for seniors. Beale has helped bring in new businesses that have created over 4,000 new jobs in the Ward. Beale has also brought in more government subsidized senior housing than any previous alderman.

In 2008 Beale spent more of his aldermanic expense account than any other alderman on public relations, with more than $16,000 paid to The Publicity Works, a company owned by longtime Democratic political consultant Delmarie Cobb. Beale said the company handles media inquiries and puts together his ward newsletter, among other duties. In February 2012, the Chicago Dispatcher reported that Beale attended a fundraiser in his honor held by members of Chicago's taxicab industry just five days before legislation governing the industry was to be heard, which he and Mayor Rahm Emanuel introduced. The Chicago Dispatcher also reported that certain provisions of the legislation changed just prior to the hearing, which were favorable to taxicab operators who threw the fundraiser.

In the runoff of the 2019 Chicago mayoral election, Beale endorsed Lori Lightfoot.

In November 2019, Beale was one of eleven aldermen to vote against Mayor Lori Lightfoot's first budget.

After he tried to organize opposition to Lightfoot's choice for Finance Committee chairman, Scott Waguespack, he was stripped of his own committee chairmanship. Beale became a regular critic of Lightfoot, and particularly has opposed her attempts to scale back the practice of aldermanic prerogative.

== 9th ward Committeeperson ==
In 2000, Beale defeated Robert Shaw to become the 9th Ward's committeeman. Beale continues to serve as its committeeperson, having been reelected in 2004, 2008, 2012, 2016, and 2020.

== Public service ==
Beale has taken part in various civic organizations, including the Board for Redevelopment of the Roseland area; he served as President of the 100th Street of Prairie Block Club of Roseland; and as Acting Vice President of the United Block Club of Roseland. Additionally, he is an active member of the Rosemoor Community Association, the 5th District Advisory Committee, Rainbow/PUSH Coalition, the National Association for the Advancement of Colored People (NAACP), Chicago Alternative Policing Strategy (CAPS), Roseland Redevelopment Ad Hoc Committee and Salem Baptist Church. Beale was a candidate in the 2013 Democratic primary in Illinois' 2nd congressional district to replace resigning convicted U.S. Congressman Jesse Jackson, Jr. Beale finished third with 11% of the vote behind former Illinois House of Representatives member Robin Kelly (52%) and former U.S. Representative Debbie Halvorson (25%); in Beale's home 9th ward, Kelly (50%) bested Beale (34%).

== Personal life ==
Beale currently lives in the Roseland neighborhood with his wife, Dana, and their three children. Beale attends and serves as a member of Salem Baptist Church.

=== Whitney Young High School incident ===
On August 24, 2009, Beale became the second alderman to concede his daughter had gained admission to Whitney M. Young Magnet High School, an elite magnet school, after he contacted principal Joyce Kenner, with whom he had a "personal relationship."

== See also ==
- List of Chicago alderpersons since 1923
