= Taxis of the United States =

Taxicabs of the United States vary by jurisdiction. Companies may be independently owned small businesses with only one driver or have fleets of 100 or more vehicles. Drivers are rarely employees of the company, and usually lease the vehicle on a per-shift basis. They can also be owned by separately-incorporated small businesses that subscribe to a dispatch service. The owner/driver will pay a monthly fee to the company; purchase and maintain his own vehicle, and may in turn lease shifts to other drivers. Ridesharing companies are major competitors to taxi companies, providing vehicle for hires via mobile apps in many US cities.

== Statistics ==
As of 2024, the total number of taxi drivers, including shuttle drivers, and chauffeurs, in the United States was 393,400; the average annual salary was $36,660 or $17.62 per hour and the expected percent job increase over the next 10 years was 11%.

== Medallions ==
Some cities use "taxi medallions" as permits for taxicab drivers to pick up passengers. Because the medallion system is a government-created intentional constraint on the supply of taxicabs, and historically cities have increased the number of medallions much more slowly than the growth in demand for taxis, medallions have generally been considered a great investment; though recently the increased supply of cars for hire created by ridesharing companies has been eroding the value of medallions.

In New York City and other cities, a "medallion" is required in order to legally pick up passengers flagging on the street. In Saint Augustine Florida medallions sell for just $50.00 and the city requires yearly car inspections. Medallions, or CPNC (Certificate of Public Necessity and Convenience), may also be sold in Boston, or Chicago, but in San Francisco—one of the few other cities that has medallions—the sale of medallions became prohibited by Prop K in 1978. This proposition was adopted to stop speculators from driving the price of medallions up beyond the reach of the people who provide the service—the drivers. In 2010, the City of San Francisco attempted to allow the sale of medallions (for an estimated $250,000 each) in order to balance the City budget.

According to The Washington Post, medallions were "the best investment in America", but, due to increased competition from mobile app-based vehicle for hire companies, taxi medallions are now decreasing in price.

== Operations ==
Some taxicab companies are independently owned small businesses with only one taxicab and driver, but many cab companies have fleets of 100 or more taxicabs. Drivers are rarely employees of the company, and usually lease the taxicab on a per-shift basis. Lease drivers receive no benefits from the taxicab company, and often have to bribe dispatchers to get a shift. However, in some cases, cabs can also be owned by separately-incorporated small businesses that subscribe to a dispatch service, in which case the company logo on the door is that of the dispatch association. The owner/driver will pay a monthly fee to the taxicab company; purchase and maintain his own vehicle; and may in turn lease shifts to other drivers.

A suburban taxi company may operate under several different names serving several adjacent towns. They often provide different phone numbers for each fleet, but they usually all ring into a central dispatch office. They may have subsidiary taxi businesses holding licences in each town. Taxi companies also may run multiple businesses, such as non-taxi car services, delivery services, and school buses, for additional revenue, as the infrastructure required for maintaining, operating and dispatching the fleet can be shared.

== Safety ==
In 2008, taxi driving was considered one of the top 10 most dangerous jobs in the U.S., with a 2008 fatality rate of 19.3 per 100,000 workers. Beyond the inherent dangers of taxi driving, the perceptions and attitudes of taxi drivers towards their occupation can significantly impact driving safety.

== Snubbing ==
Snubbing is getting refused or passed up by a taxicab, which is against the rules in New York.

== New Orleans ==
In January 2007, a taxi driver, Monier Gindy, was murdered. A local teenager was convicted of the crime 10 months later.

Taxi rates in New Orleans increased by $1 in 2008.

In June 2015, the city council voted unanimously to increase taxi fares for the first time in six years.

== Boston ==
The City of Boston (Massachusetts)'s Police Department issues Hackney Carriage (Taxi) Licenses. The BPD Hackney Carriage Unit handles the regulation of the city's 1,825 medallion-taxis.

To become one of the city's roughly 7,000 licensed Boston Hackney Carriage Drivers one must report to the Hackney Carriage Unit at Police Headquarters, located next to the Ruggles T station on the Orange Line. The applicant must produce documentation of legally eligible to work in the United States and must have had a Massachusetts driver's license for a minimum of one year. In addition, Hackney Officers will run a Criminal Records and Massachusetts Registry of Motor Vehicles check on the applicant.

According to an April 2011 study by the Chicago Dispatcher, a Chicago taxi industry monthly newspaper, Boston has one of the highest standard cab fares in the country, charging an estimated $18.53 for a distance of five miles with five minutes wait time (compared to an estimated $14.57 in Philadelphia and $14.10 in New York City).

Due to the different rates set by each city's taxi regulators, renting a taxi for a 12-hour shift in Boston can also be more expensive than in New York City. Using figures from the New York Taxi & Limousine Commission and the Boston Police Department's Hackney Carriage Unit, actual rates for the Chicago newspaper's hypothetical five-mile trip with five minutes wait time in Boston is $18.60. In New York, the same trip can cost either $15, $15.50 or $16, depending on time of day, due to varying surcharges and the fifty-cents NY State Sales tax added to each fare.

In virtually all industries the law of supply and demand affects prices charged to consumers, whether for goods or services. In the case of taxi service, the lower the number of residents and tourists in a city, the higher taxi fare rates are likely to be because of lower usage. New York City, the largest city in the United States, can easily afford to have lower taxi fares. The city's more than 12 million residents and 8.25 million visitors have created a vibrant non-stop city in which taxicabs find it difficult to stay empty for very long. The greatest number of taxi trips typically run less than three miles, which is where cabdrivers make the most money, due to the $3.50 "flag drop" (initial dollar-amount when the meter is started) at some of the busiest hours of the day.

Due to a combination of its age, its early Puritan roots and a large college student demographic, Boston's mass transit closes up at 1:00am for four hours of maintenance and drinking establishments are shuttered by 2:00am.

== Chicago ==
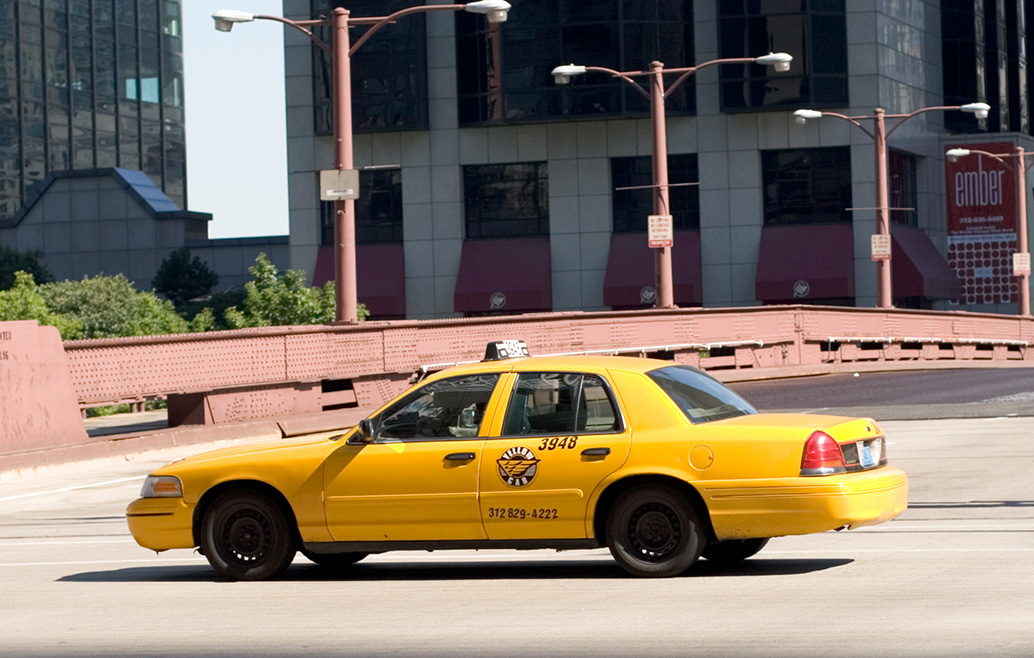
A Chicago, Illinois taxicab in July 2005.

Taxicabs in Chicago, Illinois, are operated by private companies and licensed by the city. There are about seven thousand licensed cabs operating within the city limits. Licenses are obtained through the purchase or lease of a taxi medallion which is then affixed to the top right hood of the car.

Each medallion carries a numeric code, which is also displayed prominently at several locations on (and in) the taxicab. The medallion must be purchased from the city or from another medallion owner. The supply of medallions is strictly controlled to prevent a surplus of cabs, which means that medallions trade at a high price. Unlike other cities, Chicago taxis can be of any color and drivers are not required to wear uniforms.

Flagging a taxi down is fairly easy throughout most city neighborhoods, but can often be more difficult in areas where there is low demand for cabs. Drivers are required to pick up the first or closest passenger they see, and may not refuse a fare anywhere within the city.

The passenger is required to pay the amount on the taximeter plus any additional tolls or fees. The initial entry, sometimes called a "meter drop" or "flag pull", is $3.25 regardless of distance traveled. Each additional fraction of a mile charge is $.20 for each additional 1/9 of a mile. Additionally, each 36 seconds of time elapsed, known as "wait time", is $.20. This charge is in place to ensure the driver still makes money if the cab is stuck in bad traffic. There is a flat fee of $1.00 for the first additional passenger and another $.50 for each additional passenger after that unless the passenger is under 12 or over 65 years of age.

An additional charge of $4.00 is added to the total fare on each trip from O'Hare or Midway airports under the State of Illinois Metropolitan Pier and Exposition Authority (MPEA) Airport Departure Ordinance. The tax should appear on the meter as an "extra" charge. There is a $0.50 additional charge for credit card use, and tipping is optional but encouraged at the rate of 10% of the total taximeter fare.

City of Chicago taxicabs must accept credit cards, unless the taxicab is independently owned and operated – that is, the cab does not belong to an affiliation. One can tell that a cab belongs to an affiliation from the logo on the outside door of the cab. Another way to tell if the taxicab that one is riding in is an independently owned taxicab – and therefore not subject to the requirement to accept credit cards – is whether the taxicab has a "partition" between the passenger compartment and the driver. Partitions are mandated for all taxicabs, except independently owned and operated taxicabs. The enforcement of, and compliance with, the partition rule has an inconsistent history in Chicago. A partition is no longer required, however, if a cab has a closed-circuit television.

Partition 'use requirements' have resulted in partition-impact injuries and deaths in collisions, just as in other cities like New York and Boston.

Below are some estimated cab fares from State and Madison, the downtown zero point.

- State and Madison to O'Hare Airport: $38 – $45.
- State and Madison to Midway Airport: $27 – $32.
- State and Madison to the United Center: $10– $12.

A study conducted in April 2011 by the Chicago Dispatcher revealed that Chicago has one of the lowest standard cab fare rates in country, despite higher gas prices in the city. Cabs in Chicago charge an estimated $12.72 for a distance of five miles and five minutes wait time, lower than an estimated $14.10 in New York and $18.48 in Los Angeles.

Rates from Chicago, excluding O'Hare and Midway Airports, are straight meter to the city limits plus meter and one-half from the city limits to the destination.

Straight meter fares apply to all trips departing from Midway or O'Hare airports to the following suburbs. (All other trips are metered at one and one half the rate from Chicago's city limits to the suburbs.)

Alsip	Bedford Park	Blue Island	Burnham	Calumet City	Calumet Park
Cicero	Des Plaines	Dolton	Elk Grove	Elmwood Park	Evanston
Evergreen Park	Forest View	Harwood Heights	Hines Hospital	Hometown	Lincolnwood
Merrionette Park	Niles	Norridge	Oak Lawn	Oak Park	Park Ridge
Riverdale	River Grove	Rosemont	Stickney	Summit	

== Dallas ==
The Dallas, Texas, metropolitan area taxi industry consists of approximately 1,500 taxicabs that are operated by eight taxi companies. They are Dallas Yellow Cab, Cowboy Cab, Golden Cab, Executive Cab, Starcab, Alamo Cab, Taxi Dallas, and Ambassador Cab. Of the eight, Dallas Yellow Cab is the largest with approximately 1,000 taxicabs. Dallas Yellow Cab taxis are easily identified by their uniform yellow color. The other taxi companies’ vehicles are painted a variety of colors including blue (Alamo Cab), black/silver (Executive Cab), grey/white (Cowboy Cab) and burgundy (Starcab).

Taxi transportation in Dallas is regulated by the City of Dallas Public Works and Transportation (PWT) office. PWT regulations govern a host of features of a taxicab as well as the permitting of drivers. Specifically, PWT rules determine the taxi meter rate, size of lettering on the vehicles, and color. PWT officers also conduct twice annual inspections on each taxi to ensure that it is proper working condition. Items inspected include: windshield wipers, horn, seat-belts, heat/AC, lights, brakes, fire extinguisher, tires, etc.

In 2000, the Dallas City Council passed an ordinance mandating that no vehicle can be operated as a taxicab within the city limits once it reaches five years from the date of manufacture. More recently, an effort spearheaded by Dallas Mayor Tom Leppert has begun to convert all taxicabs in Dallas to run on compressed natural gas (CNG). It has been alleged that the drive toward CNG taxis is consequence of a corrupt bargain among Dallas politicians and the large energy interests that dominate the business and civic circles of the city. To name one, Clean Energy, LP, the largest retail natural gas distributor in North Texas and majority-owned by T. Boone Pickens, is believed to be in line to reap a windfall if CNG taxis become mandatory.

In order to work as a taxi driver in the City of Dallas, a person must have no more than five moving violations and or accidents in the previous 36 months. Also they must be a citizen or otherwise authorized to work in the United States, have no felony convictions, and be 23 years of age or older. People meetings these requirements can receive a taxi driver's permit by doing the following: 1) choose a taxicab company to driving for, 2) obtain a taxicab driver application and contract from the cab company, and 3) visit the Transportation Regulation Division office for a background check and to take a taxi driver permitting course.

Taxi fares in Dallas compared to other large U.S. cities is very reasonable. The meter rate is $2.25 plus 20¢ every 1/9 mile. Additional passengers or pets (excluding service animals) are $2 extra, each. Also, fares to and from the two principal airports (DFW International Airport and Dallas Love Field) to Downtown Dallas and the Dallas Market Center area are set at a flat rate. Those rates are: $41 for DFW to or from Downtown Dallas, $18 to or from Dallas Love Field to Downtown, and $32 to or from DFW International to Dallas Market Center. Be advised: a fuel surcharge may also be added to fares if gas prices reach $2.50 per gallon or more for three consecutive weeks. In an April 2011 study conducted by the Chicago Dispatcher, Dallas taxis charge an estimated $12.75 for a distance of five miles with five minutes wait time. Tipping is not required, but is a good gesture if you receive good service from the driver.

== Honolulu ==
Taxicab services in Honolulu, Hawaii are regulated by the City and County of Honolulu. In order to be licensed, drivers must have a valid license, pass written and location tests, a background check from the Honolulu Police Department, a physical exam and a clean driving record. A white placard is then placed on the front passenger side with a photo and information, while a sticker identifying the number is placed at the rear bumper sticker. In 2012, more than 1,632 vehicles in Honolulu were registered to operate as taxicab providers.

The two largest taxi providers in Honolulu are TheCab (a wordplay on the local bus service, TheBus) and Charley's Taxi. Another operator, EcoCab, uses eco-friendly vehicles. There are also independent operators servicing the island, including those affiliated with TheCab or Charley's. The county's paratransit service, TheHandi-Van, has partnerships with the cab companies to provide services to customers in areas not accessible to buses or vans. Operators with a Department of Defense logo sticker on their front windshield are authorized to enter military facilities. Some travel agencies distribute decals to help tourists recognize drivers that are tourist-friendly and multilingual.

Fares are regulated by meters that are controlled by the City and County of Honolulu. As of 2017, start at a base rate of US$3.10 for the first 1/8 of a mile (200 m), then $0.45 for each additional 1/8 of a mile and $0.45 for every 45 seconds of wait-time.

== Las Vegas ==
Oversight of taxicabs in Las Vegas are provided by a state agency known as the Nevada Taxicab Authority which was founded on July 1, 1969. The Authority regulates 16 cab companies, over 3,000 taxicabs, over 10,000 taxicab drivers with a ridership of approximately 60,000,000 passengers per year. The Authority has approximately 29 sworn Police Officers called Compliance/Enforcement Investigators who provide 24-hour-a-day, 7 day a week policing service to the taxicab industry. Las Vegas is the only jurisdiction in the United States that employs its own police force specifically for taxicab enforcement issues. The Authority is self funded with $0.20 of every taxicab ride being paid to the Authority. The base fare in Las Vegas is $3.50.

== Los Angeles ==
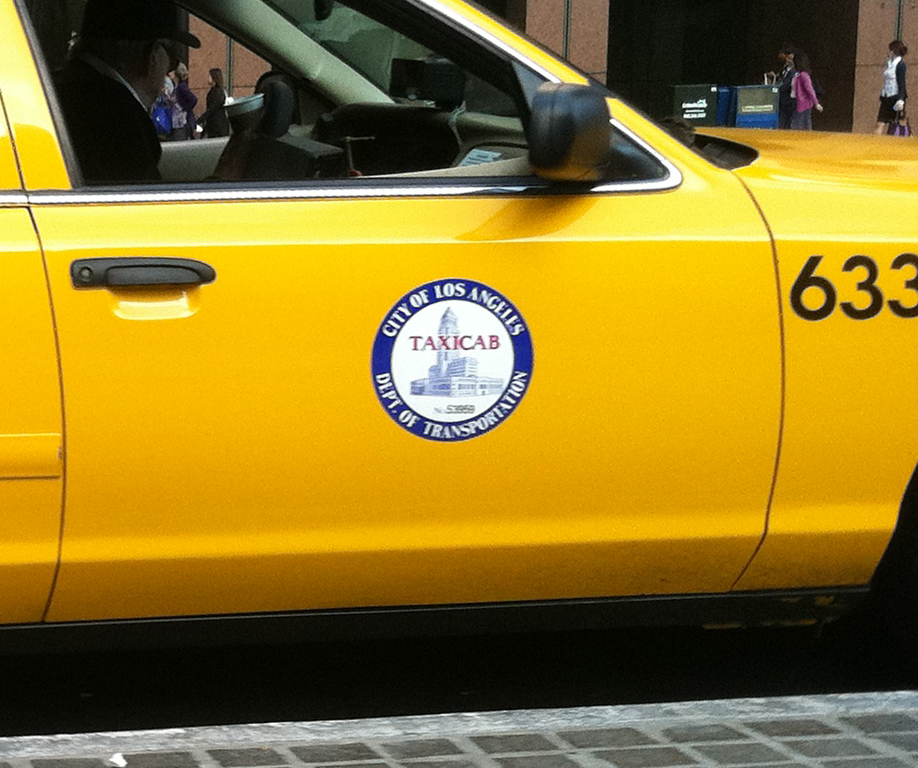
The official Los Angeles taxicab seal on a second generation Ford Crown Victoria taxicab in October 2011.

Taxicabs in Los Angeles, California are commissioned by the Board of Taxicab Commissioners, who in turn directly advise the Los Angeles Department of Transportation. The Committee holds regular meetings at the Los Angeles City Hall regarding general practices and regulations regarding registered taxis operating within city limits.

There are nine franchise taxi operators in the City of Los Angeles who operate more than 2300 taxis. As of 2011, the nine registered franchises are United Independent Taxi, Independent Taxi, United Taxi of San Fernando Valley, Yellow Cab, Checker Cab, United Checker Cab, Bell Cab, City Cab, and Beverly Hills Cab Company. While vehicle model, color, and decals may vary greatly, all officially licensed taxis must provide the official City of Los Angeles Taxicab Seal. Although taxi usage, like other forms of public transportation, had dropped while Los Angeles embraced the car culture throughout the mid-1900s, taxi usage, along with light rail and the already popular bus systems have seen a rise in popularity in recent times.

Current fares are $2.85 for a flag drop (first 1/9th mile), $.30 for each additional 1/9th mile ($2.70/mile), and $.30 for each 37 seconds of waiting and delay ($29.19/hour). A $46.50 flat fare is mandated for all trips from Los Angeles International Airport to downtown Los Angeles. In addition, a $4.00 surcharge and $15.00 minimum is required for all trips originating from LAX.

The Los Angeles Department of Transportation has repeatedly posted bulletins warning passengers not to hire "bandit taxis," or illegal taxi operations or even licensed drivers. Unregistered taxis are widely known to scam patrons and in some cases, can be dangerous. An incident in 1999 during which an unlicensed taxicab driven by an individual with a suspended license crashed into an oncoming train, killing all on board prompted the Department of Transportation and Los Angeles Police Department to crack down on these "bandit taxis."

== Miami ==
Taxicabs in Miami, Florida and Miami-Dade County are regulated by the Miami-Dade County Consumer Services Department, from which taxi drivers must obtain a chauffeurs' license. Taxicabs must feature a decal or license number on the vehicle itself, as well as display the driver's picture ID and registration number inside the cab. All licensed taxicabs use SunPass transponders for electronic toll collection, added to passenger fares. Most Miami taxis are painted yellow, although a few smaller companies use black vehicles instead, and short haul vehicles from the airport are blue.

Taxis are popular in Miami's urban neighborhoods such as Downtown Miami, Brickell and Miami Beach, the most popular routes being those from Downtown Miami to South Beach, Miami Design District or to Coconut Grove. Since many Downtown residents choose to not have cars, taxis are also popular for rides within Downtown neighborhoods, especially after midnight when the Metromover trains stop running. Taxis can be hailed on the street, or phoned or at taxicab stands.

Fares to and from Miami International Airport (MIA) and popular destinations are based on a zone system which covers Key Biscayne, Miami Beach and other communities east of the Intracoastal Waterway in Miami-Dade County, Coral Gables, and the Port of Miami, as well as short trips in the airport vicinity. For example, a trip from MIA to South Beach (approximately 11 miles) will cost passengers a flat fare of $32 (as of June 2009), inclusive of tolls and temporary fuel surcharges which rise and fall with fuel costs. An April 2011 study conducted by the Chicago Dispatcher showed that Miami taxis have moderately high fares, charging an estimated $16.10 for a distance of five miles and five minutes wait time (compared to an estimated $14.30 in Hillsborough County, FL and $18.20 in Palm Beach County, FL). Fares outside of these zones (including to Fort Lauderdale and Broward County) are metered; the first 1/6 of a mile costs $2.50, with each additional 1/6 of a mile costing $0.40 (not including any road tolls). An additional $2 surcharge (automatically included in zone fares) applies for trips to MIA or the seaport. As an example, a trip from MIA to Dolphin Mall, a distance of approximately 9.2 miles, would cost a passenger $27.25 (as of June 2009, including a $0.75 road toll and the $2 surcharge). A fuel surcharge may also be added to fares if gas prices reach $3.50 per gallon or more for three consecutive weeks. Tipping is not required, but is expected by most Miami taxicab drivers.

== New York City ==
=== Yellow cabs ===
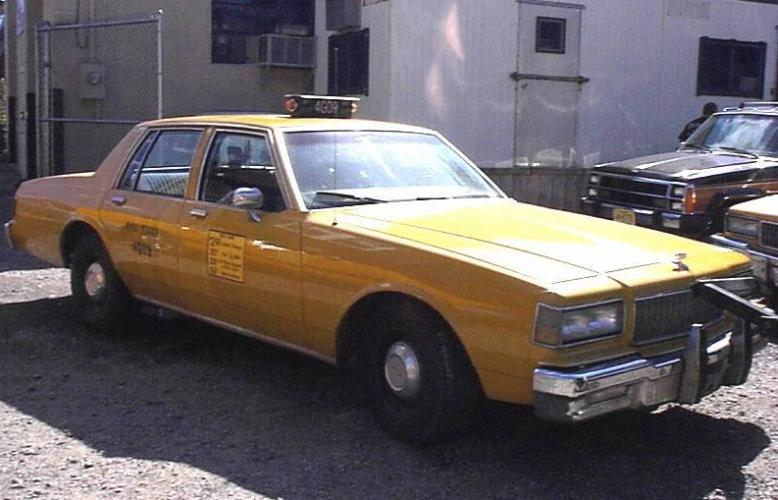
Chevrolet Caprice NYC Cab in the 1990s.

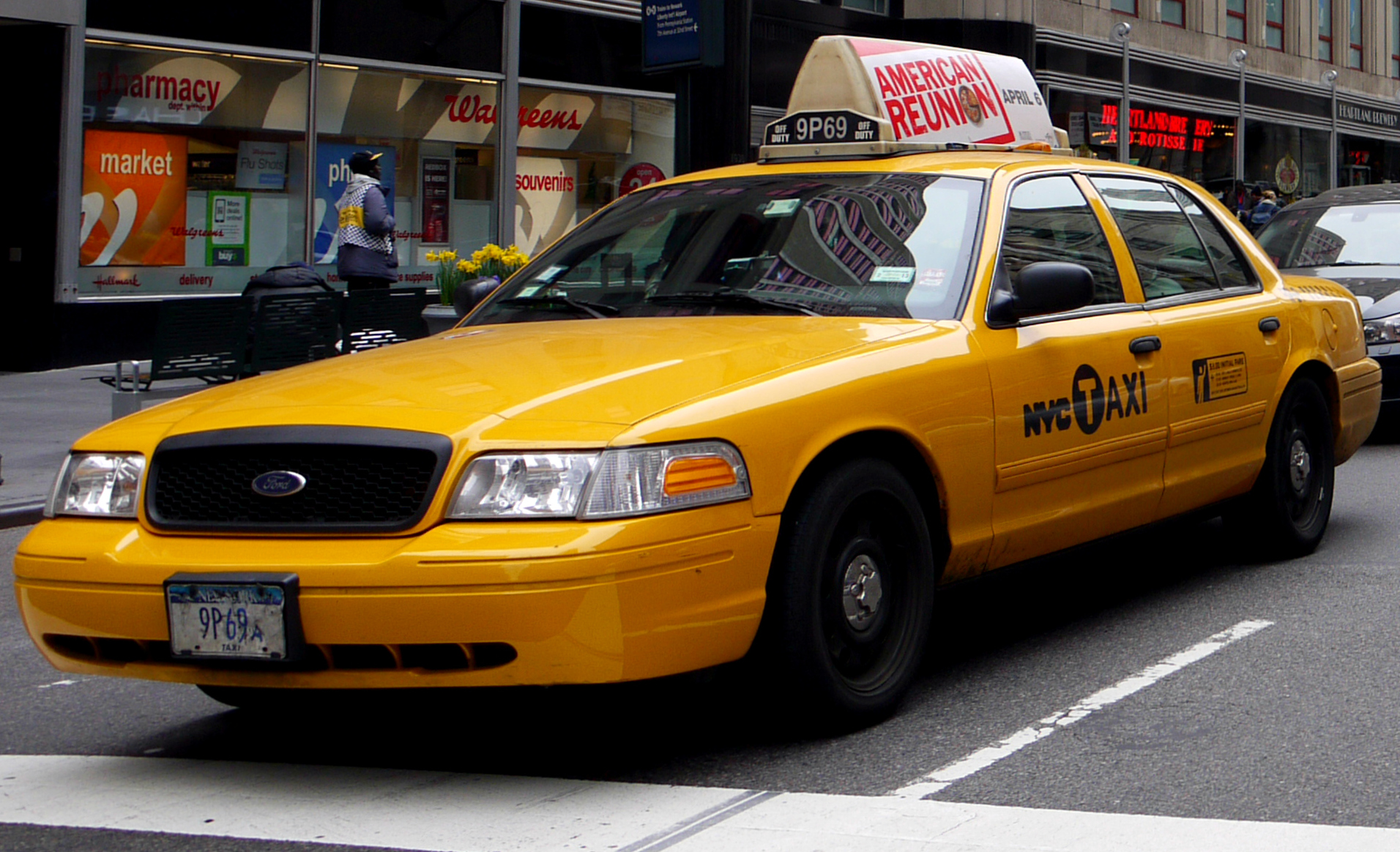
The Ford Crown Victoria became the most used yellow cab in New York City in the 1990s

New York City's taxicabs, with their distinctive yellow paint, are a widely recognized icon of the city. There are more than 13,000 taxis operating in the city, as well as more than 40,000 other for-hire vehicles. Taxicabs are operated by private companies and licensed by the Taxi and Limousine Commission (TLC), a New York City government agency.

Historically, only "medallion taxis," those painted in distinctive yellow paint and regulated by the TLC, are permitted to pick up passengers in response to a street hail. The TLC also regulates and licenses for-hire vehicles, known as "car service", which are prohibited from picking up street hails (although this is less often enforced in the boroughs outside Manhattan) and are supposed to pick up only customers who have called the car service's dispatcher and requested a car. In 2011, New York enacted a law allowing the city to issue "boro taxi" permits, which are cabs restricted to picking up passengers from streets in the outer boroughs and the northern part of Manhattan, though passengers' destinations may be anywhere in the city.

Medallion taxis are named for the official medallion issued by the TLC and attached to a taxi's hood. The medallion may be purchased from the City at infrequent auctions, or from another medallion owner. Because of their high prices, medallions (and most cabs) are owned by investment companies and are leased to drivers ("hacks"). An auction was held in 2006, where 308 new medallions were sold. In the 2006 auction, all medallions were designated as either hybrids (254) or handicap accessible (54) taxis.

Yellow cabs are often concentrated in the borough of Manhattan, but patrol throughout the five boroughs of New York City and may be hailed with a raised hand or by standing at a taxi stand. A cab's availability is indicated by the lights on the top of the car. When just the center light showing the medallion number is lit, the cab is empty and available. When the OFF DUTY inscriptions to either side of the medallion number are lit, the cab is off duty and not accepting passengers.

As of June 2006, fares begin at $2.50 ($3.00 after 8:00 p.m., and $3.50 during the peak weekday hours of 4:00–8:00 p.m.) and increase based on the distance traveled and time spent in slow traffic (40 cents for each one-fifth of a mile or 60 seconds of no motion or motion under 12 miles an hour). The passenger also has to pay the toll whenever a cab is driven through a toll booth. The taxi must have an E-ZPass tag, and passengers pay the discounted E-ZPass toll rates. According to an April 2011 study by the Chicago Dispatcher, New York City taxis have a relatively low standard fare, charging an estimated $14.10 for a distance of five miles and five minutes wait time (compared to an estimated $18.48 in West Hollywood, CA and $12.87 in Houston, TX). Taxi drivers are not permitted to use cell phones while transporting passengers, even if they use a hands-free headset.

241 million passengers rode in New York taxis in 1999. The average cab fare in 2000 was $6; over $1 billion in fares were paid that year in total.

New York City Mayor Bloomberg declared that the city would select its type of taxi for the next ten years. The Nissan NV200 won the competition for the Taxi of Tomorrow. From 2013 on, approximately 13,000 new taxis of this type will be delivered to New York City.

=== Car service ===
A car service, also known as a livery vehicle, is used to refer to a type of vehicle for hire transportation. It differs from yellow cab service in that the term "taxi" is used exclusively to refer to medallion taxis, which may be flagged down on the street on demand. By contrast, car service refers to services which are hired only by appointment over the telephone and dispatched by radio to the driver (taxicabs may also be hired in this way). Car service differs from the more upscale limousine services which are usually reserved for special occasions or business purposes.

Car services are especially popular in the parts of New York City, such as Staten Island and parts of Queens and Brooklyn, which do not have frequent circulating taxi service. Car service vehicles do not resemble taxicabs but normal sedans of various colors, usually marked by a company logo on the door. Car service also differs from taxicab service in that taxicab fares are determined by meters, whereas car service fares are determined by distance and are typically told to the driver over the intercom radio. In local terminology, one is said to "take a car service" when using such a vehicle.

=== Boro taxis ===
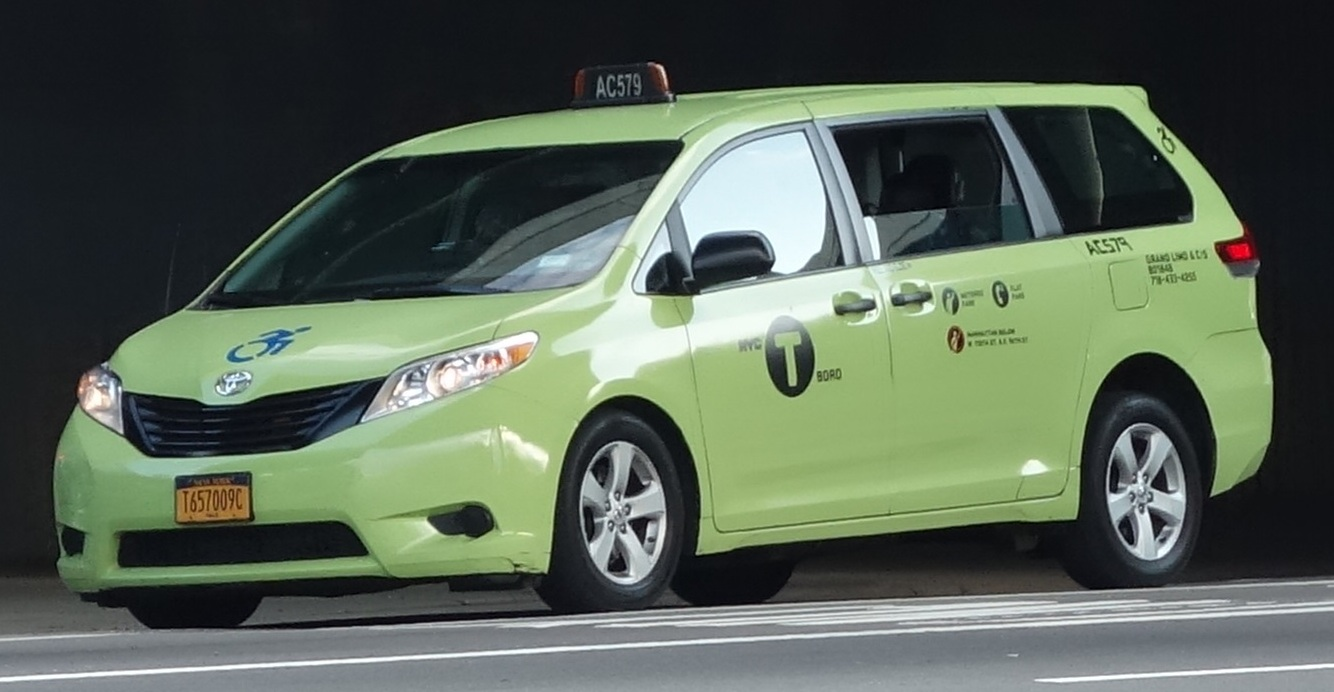
An apple green "Boro Taxi"

Boro taxis (or boro cabs) are a special type of livery vehicles that are allowed to pick up passengers from a street hail in the outer boroughs (the Bronx, Brooklyn, Queens, and Staten Island) and north of East 96th and West 110th streets of Manhattan except at the airports, but can drop them off anywhere. The boro taxis have standard markings and decals similar to the yellow cabs but they are in "apple green" color to distinguish them from the yellow cabs.

The vehicles are equipped with GPS, debit/credit card reader, a meter, a roof light and a camera or a partition in the same way as in the yellow cabs. The meter fares for street hailed trips are the same rate as in the yellow cabs. Boro taxis are still considered a car service, therefore customers can call their bases for pre-arranged trips in the same way that they normally do with other car services. The pre-arranged trips can pick up passengers in the outer boroughs including the airports and northern Manhattan, but are still prohibited from picking up any passengers below East 96th and West 110th streets.

== Pennsylvania ==
=== Amish country ===
Unlicensed taxicabs are found among the Amish of rural Pennsylvania. Old Order Amish do not drive, but will hire a van or taxicab for trips which they cannot use their traditional horse and buggy transportation. According to an April 2011 study conducted by the Chicago Dispatcher, Pennsylvania taxis have relatively low standard fares, charging an estimated $13.30 for a distance of five miles with five minutes wait time. Philadelphia's fares, however, are slightly higher, charging an estimated $14.57 with the same qualifications.

=== Pittsburgh ===
Yellow Cab of Pittsburgh is the main taxicab company in Pittsburgh, with over 300 vehicles in its fleet, all later model sedans and vans in good, PUC-inspected condition, as mandated by the Public Utility Commission of Pennsylvania. Most of the cabs are leased by drivers, but a very slight few are owner-operated. In addition to the typical Yellow Cab vehicles, there is a Green Cab (ecologically green), a few Pink Cabs (to promote breast cancer awareness), a Red Cab (to promote heart health) and a couple Blue Cabs (to promote prostate health). Cabs which bear the designation "METRO" on their tail ends denote probationary cab drivers, who are required to drive Metros until at least one month has passed since the end of their training; the actual amount of time before a new driver may drive a "Yellow" is determined on a case-by-case basis. The main distinction between a "Yellow" and a "Metro" is that Metro drivers are encouraged to learn to work the town, by not being permitted at the airport.

The Yellow Cab Company of Pittsburgh operates 24-hours a day, 7 days a week, 365 days a year. Cab stands exist on Downtown streets and at most major hotels, the casino and the airport. Cabs can be hailed in Downtown, Oakland, the South Side, the North Shore, and the Strip District, but fares outside these areas will likely require a call in to a dispatch operator, who will then attempt to dispatch a nearby cab. All cab drivers have been fingerprinted, screened for criminal records at the state and local level, and hold child abuse clearances in accordance with the state Act. Drivers receive approximately 40 hours of training prior to driving a cab, beginning with the "Metro" as noted above. Cab drivers in Pittsburgh mainly lease their cabs for either of two shifts: a 24-hour period during which they can work whenever they want, or, a 10-hour shift which is worked and then the taxicab is returned to the garage.

The rates for a Yellow Cab in Pittsburgh as of September, 2011 are an initial charge of $3.35 plus $0.25 per 1/7 of a mile, plus $0.25 for each minute of waiting time. In trips over 20 miles, the meter will automatically begin calculating the distance following the initial 20 miles at $0.50 per 1/7 mile. There is an additional $1.00 charge added to all fares for trips to or from the Pittsburgh International Airport, and for trips on Sundays or Holidays. Tipping is not required, but is expected by most Pittsburgh taxicab drivers.

In Pittsburgh, jitney refers to an illegal taxi operation. They are plentiful in low-income communities where regular taxi service is scarce. As enforcement is lax, jitney drivers have even created cooperatives to support each other and to establish jitney stands. They are known to gather at the parking lots of grocery stores in low-income communities. Some jitney drivers accept requests for service by phone from their regular customers.

The issue of whether to legalize jitneys has been considered several times by Pennsylvania's Public Utility Commission since at least 1975. The thinking behind the proposal is that jitneys often service areas regular Yellow Cab drivers will not go, thus picking up slack in transportation needs. Famed Pittsburgh playwright August Wilson wrote a play called Jitney, which was published in 1982.

== Sacramento ==
Sacramento, the capital of California, is estimated to have 500 taxis and a meter-based fare system. Most taxi companies charge a $4.00 flag drop, $3.00 for each additional mile, and $28.00 per hour waiting time. There are 9 taxi associations in Sacramento: Sta, Capital Cab Association, Yellow Cab, Sacramento Taxi Yellow Cab and Americab.

=== Davis ===
Davis is a city west of Sacramento, in California, is estimated to have 50 taxis and a meter-based fare system. Most taxi companies charge a $4.00 flag drop, $3.00 for each additional mile, and $28.00 per hour waiting time. There are 6 taxi services in Davis: dan's cab, friendly cab, village cab, college cab, a & b taxi, and Yellow Cab.

== Washington, D.C. ==
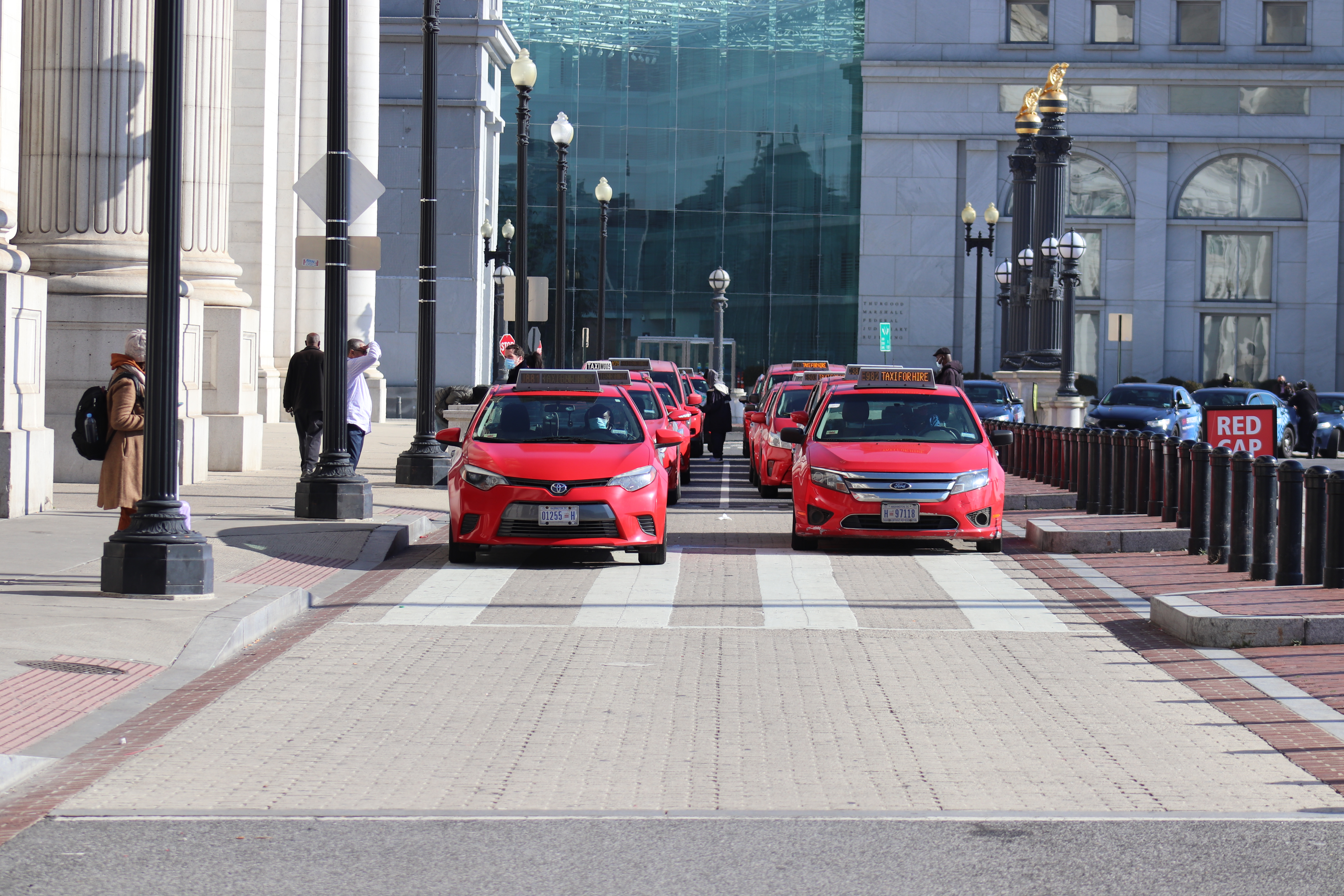
Taxis lining up outside of Union Station.

Taxicabs in Washington, D.C. are regulated by the Department of For-Hire Vehicles (DFHV). In 2008, D.C. taxicabs changed from a zone-based fare system to a conventional meter-based fare system.

In 2013, new regulations mandated a consistent paint scheme and dome lights to modernize the cabs.

Fares start at a base rate of $4.00 for the first 1/8 mile (0.20 km), then $2.56 for each additional mile. There is also a wait-time rate of $25 per hour and a $0.50 passenger surcharge. Other fees may apply, such as for phone dispatches, airports, tolls, interstate travel, and declared snow emergencies.

In Arlington County, part of Washington Metropolitan Area, EnviroCAB operates the first carbon negative, all-hybrid vehicle taxi fleet, which was established in 2008. Its founder and CEO, Hans Hess, was the 2008 winner of the "Visionary" category in the Greater Washington Green Business Awards hosted by the Washington Business Journal and the Greater Washington Board of Trade.

== Count of taxicabs by city ==
City	Taxi Certificates	Other
New York City, New York	13,587	and 40,000+ other for hire vehicles
Chicago, Illinois	6,650	
Washington, D.C.	6,300 (as of 2015)	
Los Angeles, California	2,300	
Houston, Texas	2,245	
San Francisco, California	1,825	71 of these are wheelchair accessible
Atlanta, Georgia	1,550	
Boston, Massachusetts	1,494	and 10,000+ other vehicles for hire
Detroit, Michigan	1,310	
Cambridge, Massachusetts	1,256	
Orlando, Florida	1,800	
Baltimore, Maryland	1,151	
St. Louis, Missouri	933	120 Premium Sedans
Seattle, Washington	842	16 of these are wheelchair accessible
Minneapolis, Minnesota	799	
Austin, Texas	669	
Columbus, Ohio	500	
Milwaukee, Wisconsin	321	
Memphis, Tennessee	317	
Dayton, Ohio	117	
Saginaw, Michigan	41	

== See also ==
- Taxicabs by country
