= Clean Air Cab =

Former carbon-neutral taxi provider in Arizona, USA

Clean Air Cab was an Arizona-based carbon-neutral taxi service provider, and the second taxi fleet in the U.S. to use only hybrid vehicles. Based in Mesa, Arizona, it served the Phoenix area with environmentally friendly transportation service by using clean automotive technology. Clean Air cab ceased operations November 2016.

== Description ==
The main goal of the operation was to be an environmentally aware business, and to take action to mitigate the damage done by pollution while providing a reliable and competitive transportation service. Launched in October 2009, it was the first subsidiary company of Beyond Green, L.L.C.

The taxi fleet once consisted of 29 Toyota Prius vehicles, whose hybrid design helped cut emissions by 66% compared to typical taxi fleets of Ford Crown Victorias. Only vehicles that qualified as Super Ultra Low Emission Vehicles, which are hybrid vehicles that work to minimize air pollution, were used. Using hybrid vehicles helped the state of Arizona do its part in reducing greenhouse gas emissions in compliance with the Western Climate Initiative, which is "a collaboration of independent jurisdictions who commit to work together to identify, evaluate, and implement policies to tackle climate change at a regional level."

The company purchased carbon offsets and supported reforestation by subsidizing the planting of 10 rain forest trees monthly for each cab in service. Their atmospheric carbon reduction partners were Trees for Tempe at the local level, and Trees for the Future and Carbonfund.org on a global level. Since October 19, 2009 over 15,000 trees had been planted.

== Charity involvement ==
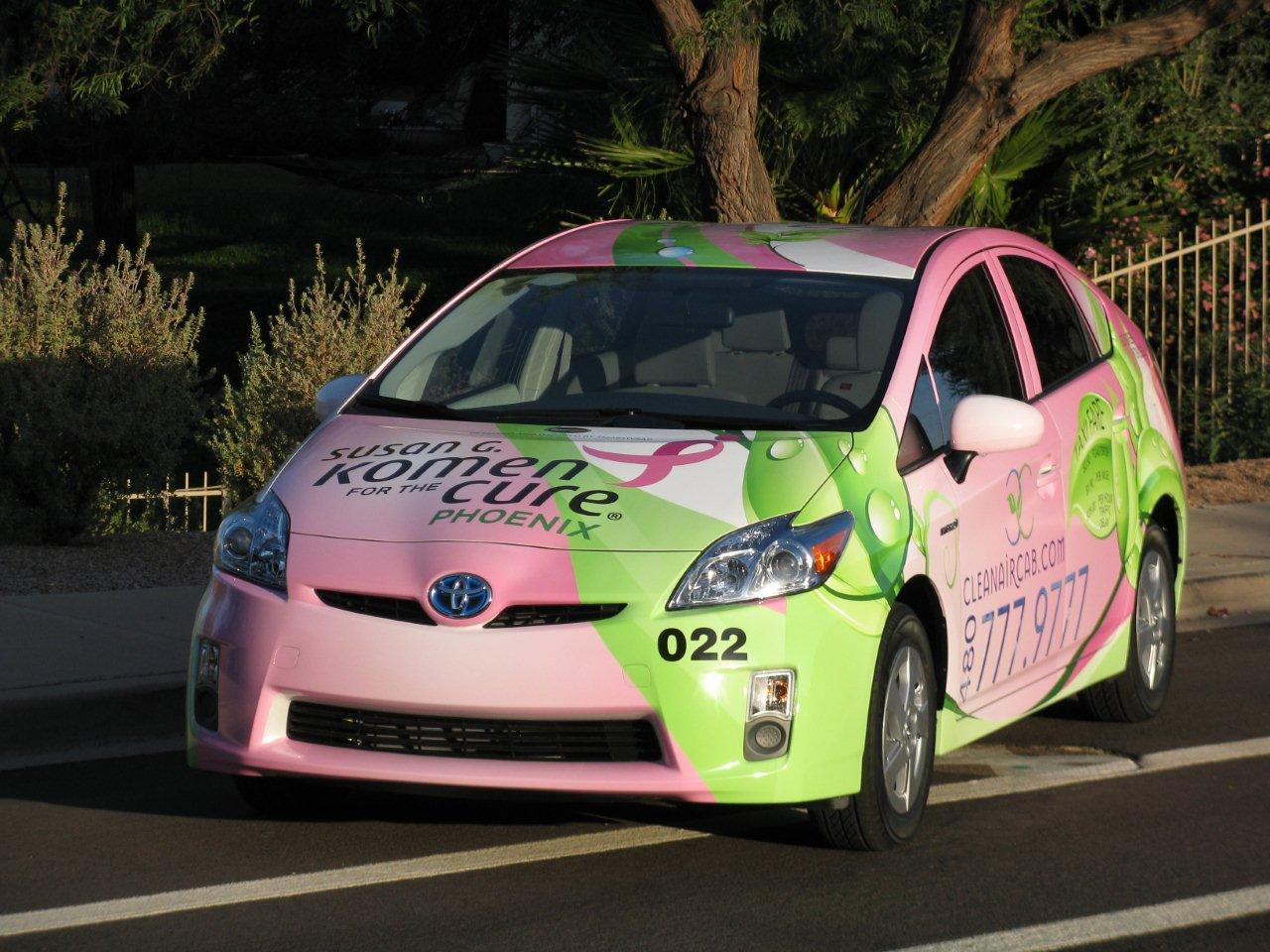
Portions of fares in the Susan G. Komen cab are donated to Susan G. Komen for the Cure.

Clean Air Cab had a "Pink Cab", where some of the fares are donated to Susan G. Komen for the Cure. Three more cabs were added in 2011, for the Phoenix Children's hospital, United Way, and Arizona State University. In December 2009, Clean Air Cab sponsored the Pro Players Classic charity golf tournament. Clean Air Cab actively participated in the Valley Metro's Adopt-A-Station program to maintain cleanliness at light rail stations, promoting the use of environmentally friendly transportation choices.

== Affiliations ==
Clean Air Cab was a member of both the Phoenix Green Chamber of Commerce and the Greater Phoenix Gay & Lesbian Chamber of Commerce. It was also a member of Valley Forward, a Phoenix-based non-profit organization focusing on environmental protection and sustainability. In February 2013 Clean air Cab joined One Community and signed the Unity Pledge decreeing equality for all individuals regardless of orientation in the work place.

== See also ==
- EnviroCAB
- Hybrid taxi
- Green vehicle
