= Hybrid taxi =

Taxicab service provided with a hybrid electric car

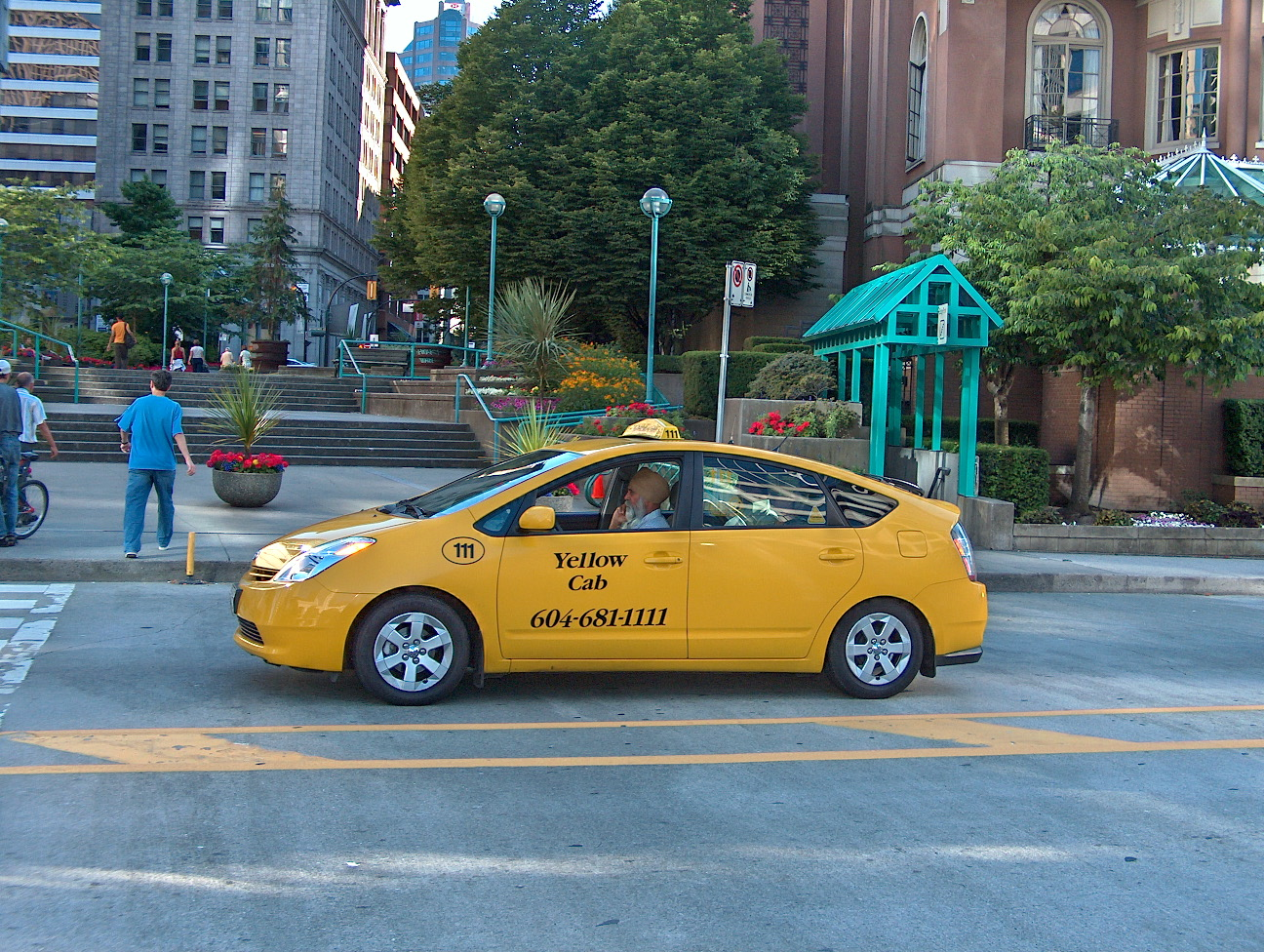
Toyota Prius taxi on a street in Vancouver, Canada.

Hybrid taxi or hybrid electric taxi is a taxicab service provided with a hybrid electric car (HEV), which combines a conventional internal combustion engine propulsion system with an electric propulsion system.

In 2000, North America's first hybrid taxi was put into service in Vancouver, British Columbia, operating a 2001 Toyota Prius which traveled over 332,000 km (206,000 mi) before being retired. In 2015, taxi driver in Austria claims to have covered 1,000,000 km (620,000 mi) in his Toyota Prius with the original battery pack.

Several major cities in the world are adding hybrid taxis to their taxicab fleets, led by San Francisco where hybrid represent almost 50% of its taxicab fleet by March 2010, and New York City where hybrids taxis represent 45% of the city's total fleet by September 2012. Unlike conventional gasoline cars, hybrids get better fuel economy, do well at slow speeds or idling, and have cleaner emissions.

== Hybrid taxis by city ==
=== Arlington, Virginia ===
The Arlington County Board authorized in September 2007 a new taxi company, EnviroCAB, to operate with an all-hybrid fleet of 50 vehicles. In addition, the Board authorized existing companies permission to add 35 hybrid taxis. The introduction of green taxis is part of a county campaign known as Fresh AIRE, or Arlington Initiative to Reduce Emissions. AIRE aims to cut production of greenhouse gases from county buildings and vehicles by 10% by 2012.

The hybrid taxis began operating in February 2008, allowing EnviroCAB to become the first all-hybrid taxicab fleet in the United States. EnviroCAB fleet consist of Toyota Priuses, Toyota Camry Hybrids, Toyota Highlander Hybrids, and Ford Escape Hybrids.

The company claims to be the first carbon-negative taxicab company in the world, as it will completely offset its own emissions by purchasing "clean-source" offset credits. Also, EnviroCAB expects to offset the emissions of 100 of the approximately 685 non-hybrid taxis operating in Arlington by March 2008.

=== Boston, Massachusetts ===
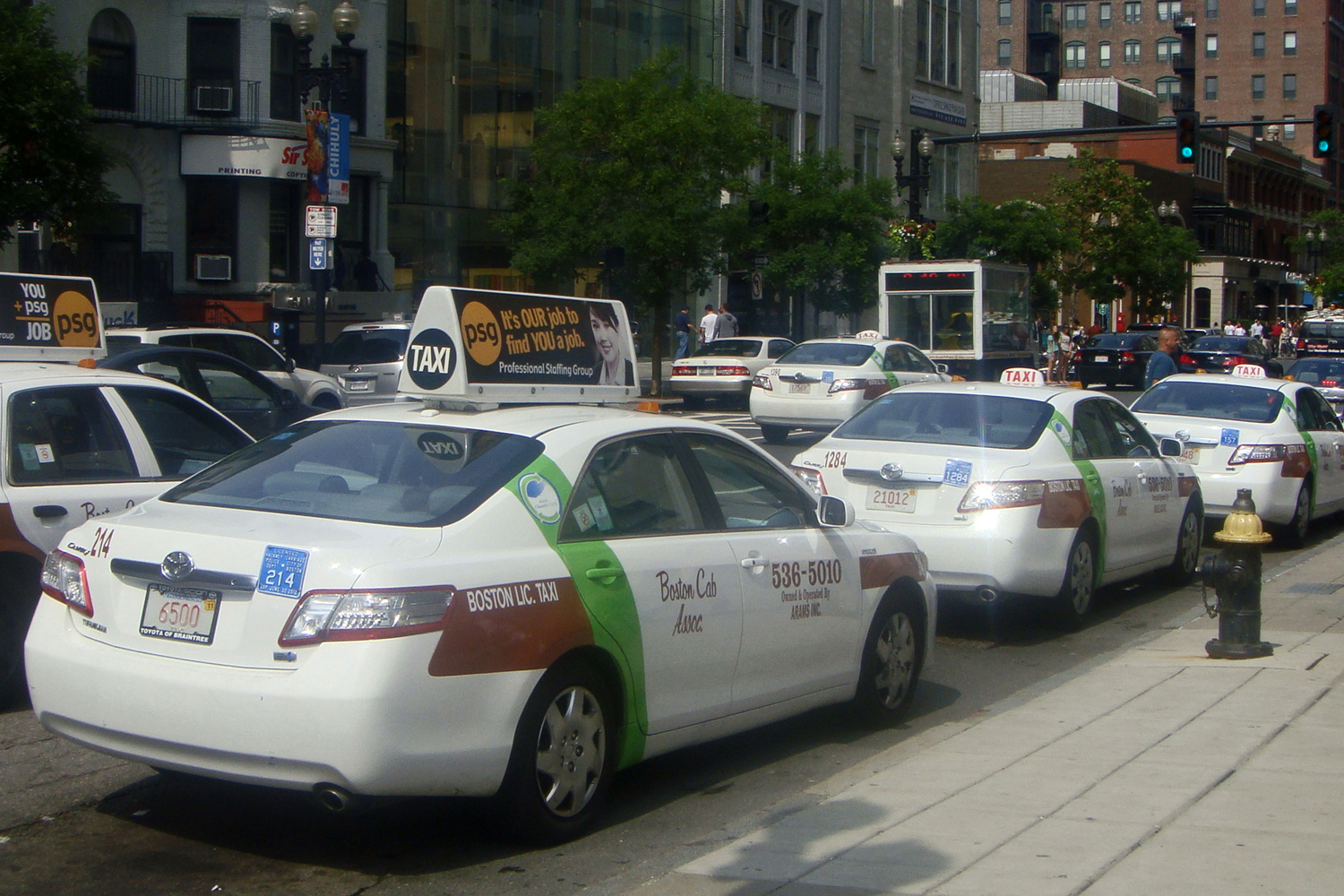
CleanAir Cabs in Boston. Program participants are identified by the green strip livery on the rear quarter

The city of Boston launched the CleanAir Cabs program in April 2007. The program promotes replacing older fuel-inefficient cabs with hybrid and alternative fuel vehicles as the existing fleet ages out. The main benefit of the CleanAir Cabs program for cab drivers is the operating savings, as hybrid taxi cabs can get up to three times as many miles per gallon of fuel as the old Crown Victoria cabs. In addition, hybrid taxi drivers get two "front of the line" passes per shift at Logan Airport, allowing them to make two extra trips daily. Hybrid taxi owners who lease vehicles to drivers are allowed to charge drivers US$15 more per shift to lease a taxi, enabling medallion owners to earn more than US$5,000 annually. By early 2009 this voluntary program had translated into about 50 hybrid operating on Boston's streets.

In August 2008 Boston mandated that all its 1,825 taxi fleet must be converted to hybrids by 2015. As of March 2009 about 10% of the taxicab fleet were already hybrids as owner voluntarily began introducing HEVs since 2002, mainly Toyota Camry Hybrids plus those introduced by the incentives of the CleanAir Cabs.

However, in March 2009 a group of taxi drivers and medallion owners sued in federal court the City of Boston to block the requirement and requested the city to delay the changeover for two or three years. They also complained that the new rule is unreasonable because it forbids taxi owners from buying used hybrids. In July 2009 a federal judge granted the request for a temporary injunction and ordered the city to stop enforcing the rule requiring medallion owners to buy new hybrid cars by 2015. Among others, the taxi owners argued that the requirements infringe on federal authority to set fuel-economy and emissions standards, an argument successfully used by New York cab owners to block a similar requirement. In April 2012, the City of Boston awarded the Boston Cab Association with the 2012 Green Business Award for its fleet conversion to hybrid vehicles. Boston Cab has more than 400 hybrid taxis out of its 500 vehicle fleet, and has plans to convert the entire fleet.

=== Cambridge, Massachusetts ===
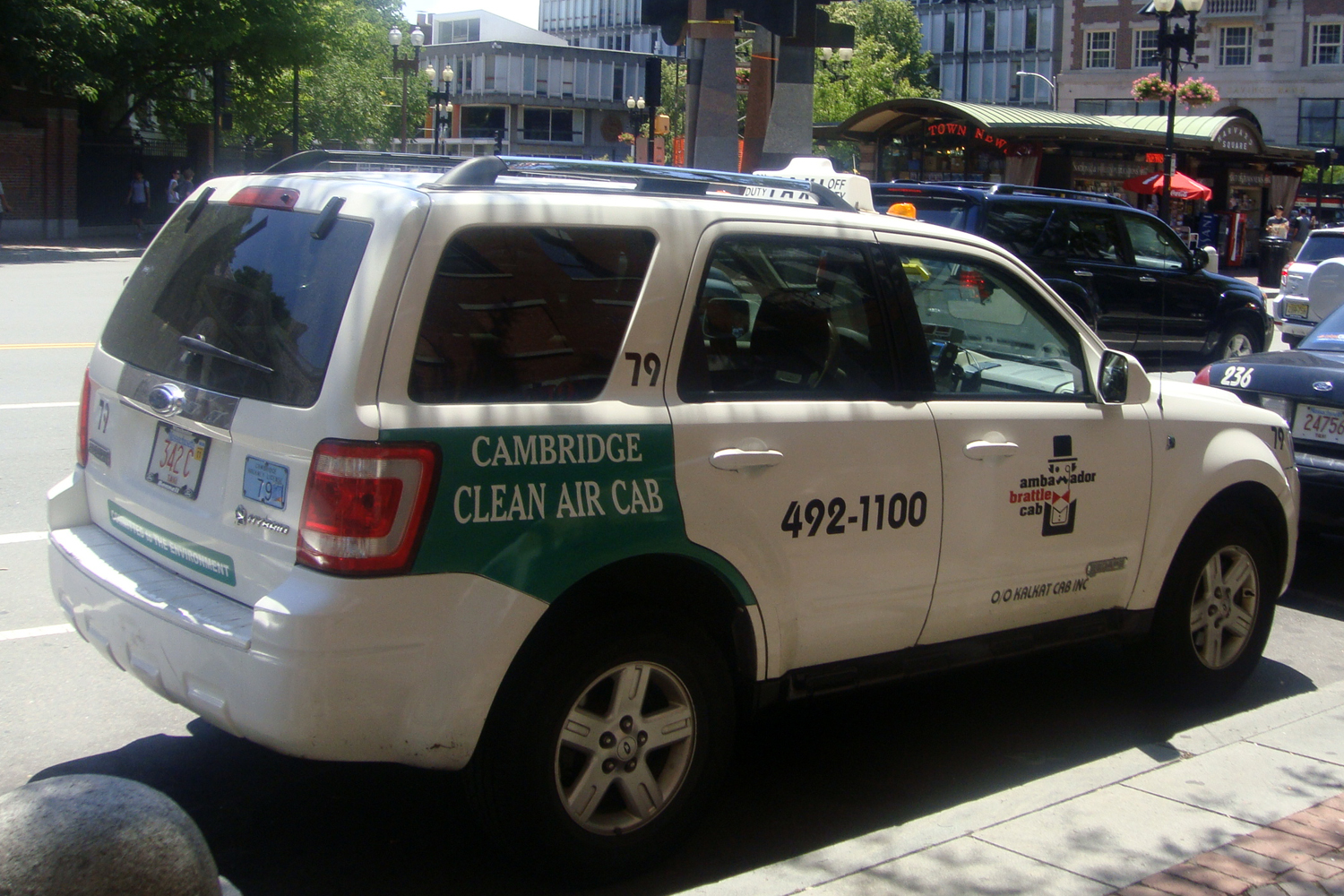
Cambridge's Clear Air Cab hybrid taxis display a green livery to identify the vehicles participating in the program.

In April 2008, the city of Cambridge, Massachusetts, in partnership with Whole Foods Market, began its Clear Air Cab program to promote the introduction of hybrid taxis with the objective to reduce the environmental impact of the city's taxicabs by encouraging a switch to hybrid vehicles.

Whole Foods made a US$30,000 gift to sponsor the purchase of first six new Toyota Camry Hybrid taxis. In exchange, the company obtained exclusive three-year rights to display advertisements on these taxis. The city of Cambridge provided an additional US$10,000 grant per vehicle, using funds from the auction of two taxi medallions. As of March 2009, the program resulted in 15 hybrid taxis operating in the city. Whole Foods is no longer providing grants but the city continues to do so. The taxis participating in the Clean Air Cab program display a distinctive green stripe

According to the Cambridge License Commission (CLC), and based on a study conducted by John Moore, along with Boston Cab and the Boston Public Health Commission, the average Cambridge cab driver travels about 100 miles (160 km) per shift. Assuming a gasoline price of US$3 per gallon ($0.79 per liter), the cab drivers would save an average of $18 to $21 per shift. During an average shift a Cambridge hybrid taxi will use between three and four gallons of gasoline as opposed to 10 gallons or more burnt by an outdated Crown Victoria taxicab.

=== Chicago, Illinois ===
Chicago has a fleet of 6,700 to 6,800 active taxicabs on any given day. In 2011, green taxis were added to the fleet as a result of the Department of Business Affairs and Consumer Protection's Green Taxi Program. As part of Mayor Rahm Emanuel action agenda “Sustainable Chicago 2015,” the city has the goal to achieve a taxi fleet which is 75% to 80% hybrid or compressed natural gas vehicles. As of December 2012, Chicago's fleet was 40% green, including hybrid and natural gas vehicles. As part of a 12-month pilot program to encourage alternative-fuel vehicle use, green taxis move to the front of the passenger line at Chicago's airports. A new rate structure was introduced in 2012 to encourage fleet owners to buy more fuel efficient taxis.

=== Hamburg, Germany ===
In November 2008 Hamburg became the first city in Germany to deploy a fleet of 130 environmentally friendly taxis that run on a hybrid electric or natural gas motor. Under the program, taxicabs that meet the low-emissions standards are allowed to be branded with an "Eco Taxis" logo.

=== London, United Kingdom ===
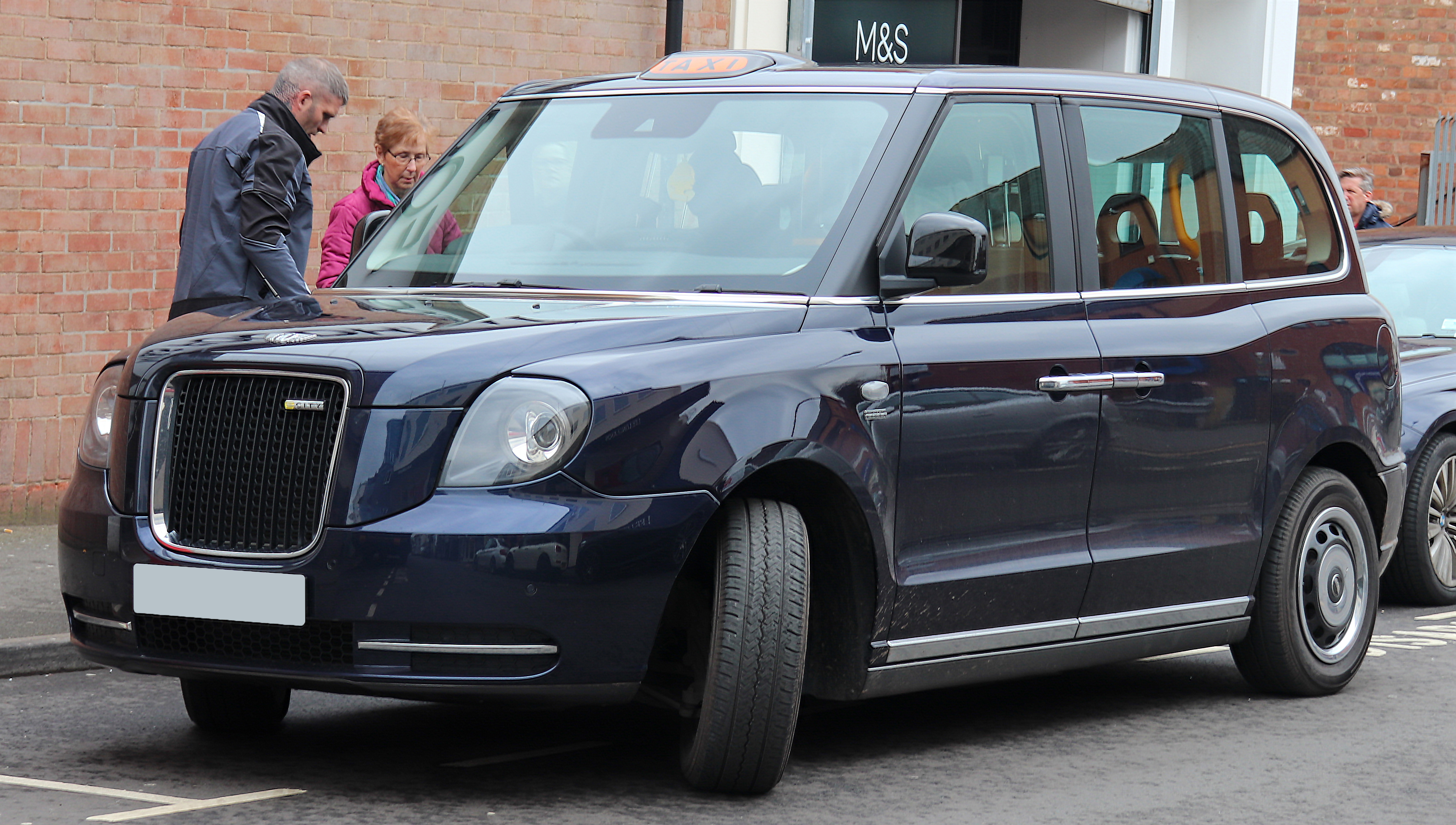
A LEVC TX in London

The first hybrid taxicab in London entered operations in 2004. It was a diesel-electric hybrid black cab. The hybrid taxicab was developed by engine designer Azure Dynamics and London Taxis International with support from the Energy Saving Trust and the Department for Transport.

The LEVC TX black taxi manufactured by the London EV Company commenced service on the streets of London in 2018. It is a plug-in hybrid range-extender electric vehicle designed to comply with new regulations, which ban new diesel engined taxis and require a zero-emissions capability.

=== New York City, New York ===
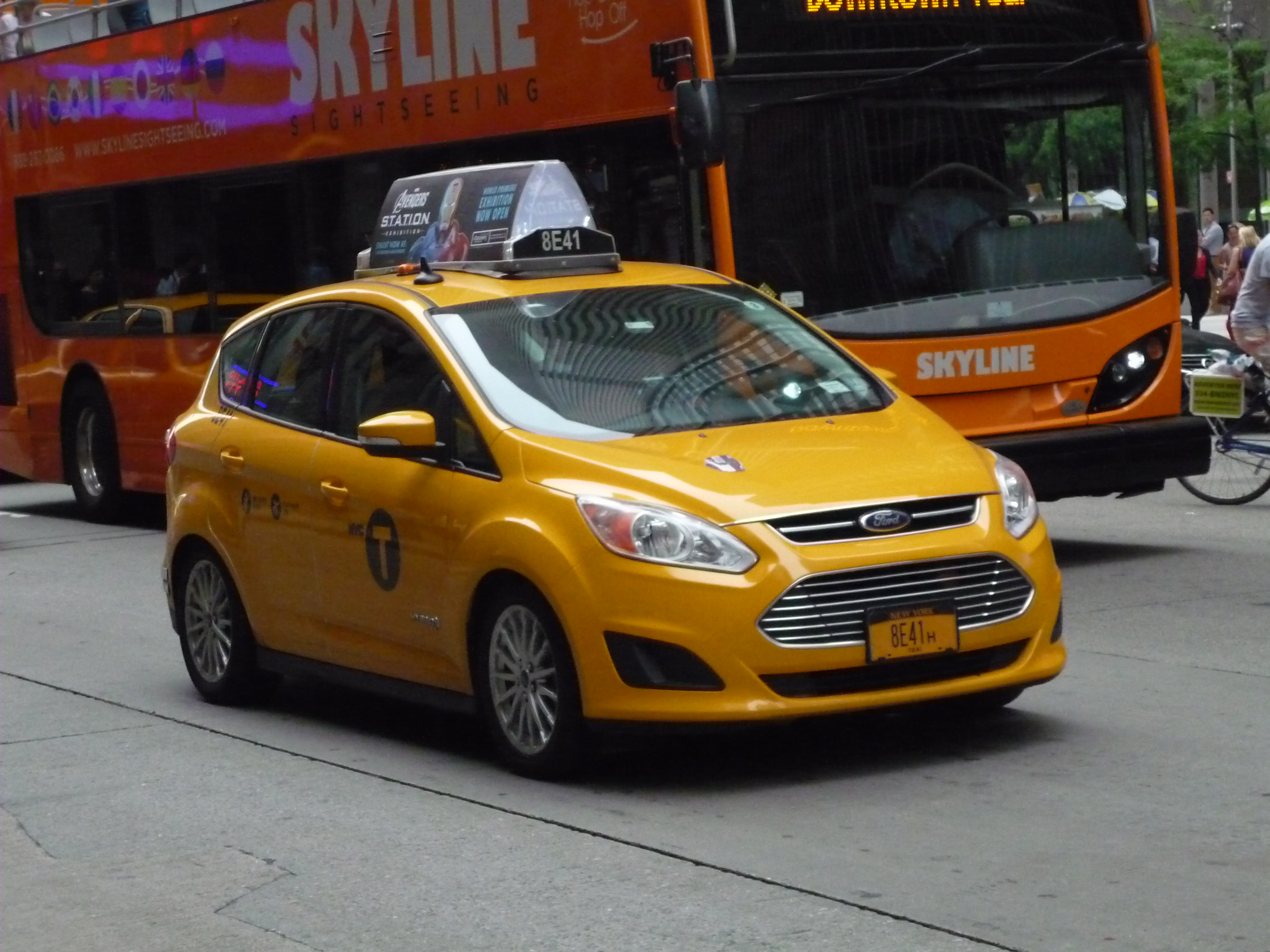
Ford C-Max Hybrid taxi in New York

The City Council passed a bill in 2003 requiring the New York City Taxi and Limousine Commission to set aside a proportion of new taxi medallions to be granted to vehicles that use cleaner fuels. The Commission cleared the first six hybrid models to be used as taxicabs by mid-2005 as there were concerns about which hybrids on the market had enough leg room. The models authorized were the Ford Escape Hybrid, Toyota Highlander Hybrid, Lexus RX 400h, Toyota Prius, Honda Accord Hybrid, and Honda Civic Hybrid. The first 27 hybrid taxis entered service in November 2005.

As integral part of the 2007 PlaNYC, Mayor Bloomberg set the goal of reducing greenhouse gas emissions by 30 percent by 2030. For this purpose, its component GreeNYC plan established that all new taxi vehicles entering the fleet beginning in October 2008 should have a fuel economy of 25 miles per U.S. gallon (9.4 L/100 km; 30 mpg_{‑imp}), rising to 30 miles per U.S. gallon (7.8 L/100 km; 36 mpg_{‑imp}) for cars entering the fleet in October 2009. Since hybrid cars were at that time the only vehicles that could meet those fuel standards, it was expected that most of New York's 13,000 taxis would be hybrids by 2012.

As of mid-2009 New York City had reached 2,019 hybrid taxis and 12 clean diesel vehicles, representing 15% of New York's 13,237 taxis in service, the most in any city in North America, and by this time owners began retiring its original hybrid fleet after 300,000 and 350,000 miles (480,000 and 560,000 km) per vehicle. The Taxi and Limousine Commission's list of 12 vehicle models that can be used as yellow taxis includes nine models are hybrids. As of July 2011, New York City had 4,980 hybrid taxis, representing almost 38% of the city's overall fleet, and about 6,000 by September 2012, representing 45% of the taxis in service.

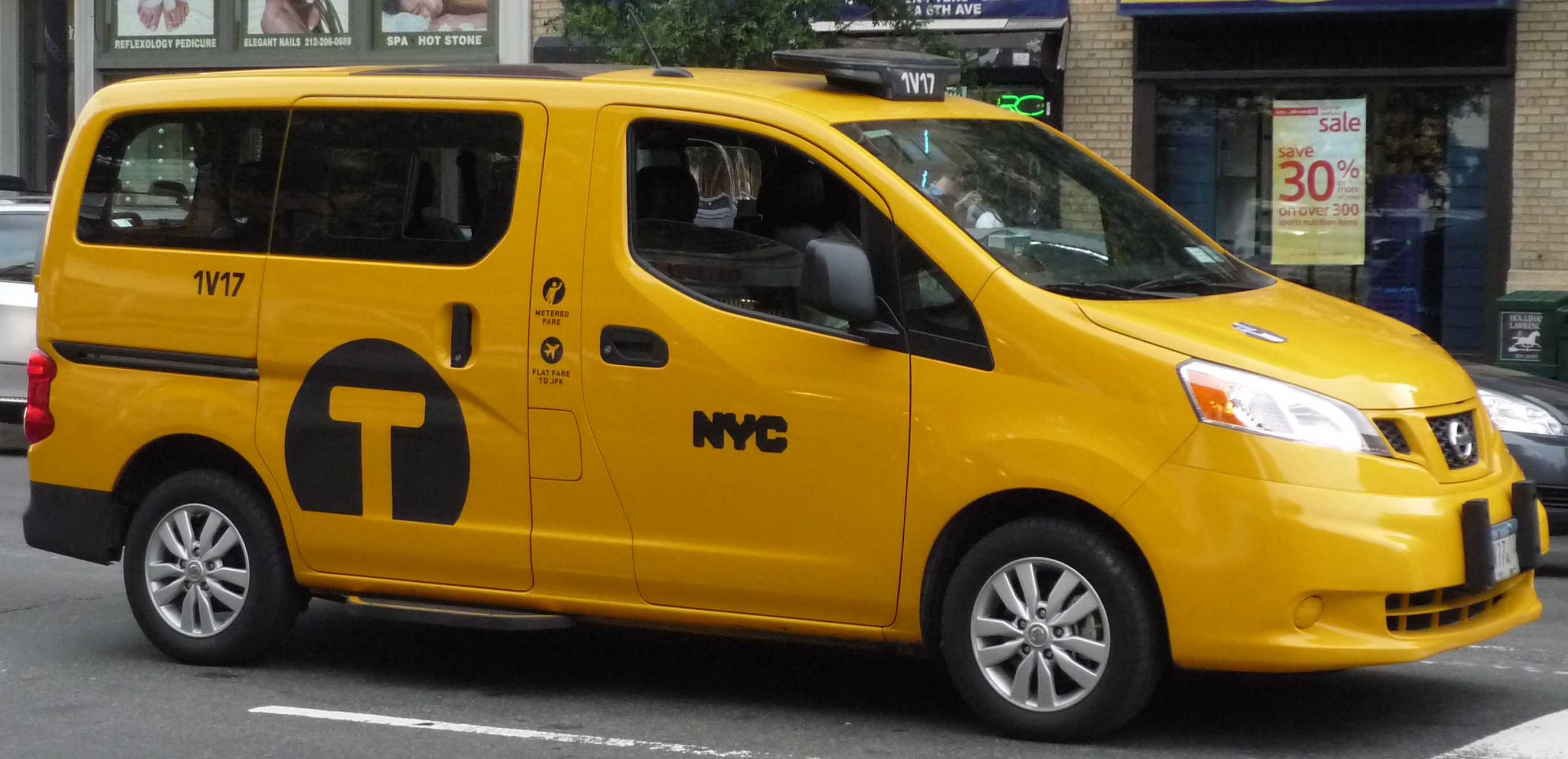
A Nissan NV200 New York taxi

The deployment of the city's Taxi of Tomorrow, scheduled to begin in 2013, would result in almost all the existing fleet to be replaced within 3 years with the non hybrid Nissan NV200 passenger van. In early 2013 the Greater New York Taxi Association filed suit against the city arguing that the Taxi of Tomorrow plan violates a section of the city's administrative code because the Nissan NV200 is not a hybrid. In June 2013, the Taxi and Limousine Commission approved an adjusted set of rules in an effort to introduce the Taxi of Tomorrow as scheduled by October 2013. According to the adjusted rules, only hybrids with a large interior, at least 130 cu ft (3,700 L), will be permitted. Two other hybrids comply with the rule are the Lexus RX 450h (US$46,310) and the Toyota Highlander Hybrid (US$41,410).

=== Paris, France ===
The taxi company Verture began operations in Paris in September 2007 with a hybrid only fleet made of Toyota Prius. The company Taxis G7 introduced in October 2007 its first hybrid taxis in Paris, and by early 2012 G7 had 500 hybrid taxis in operation in the city. Taxis Bleus introduced 30 hybrid taxis in September 2008.

=== Phoenix, Arizona ===
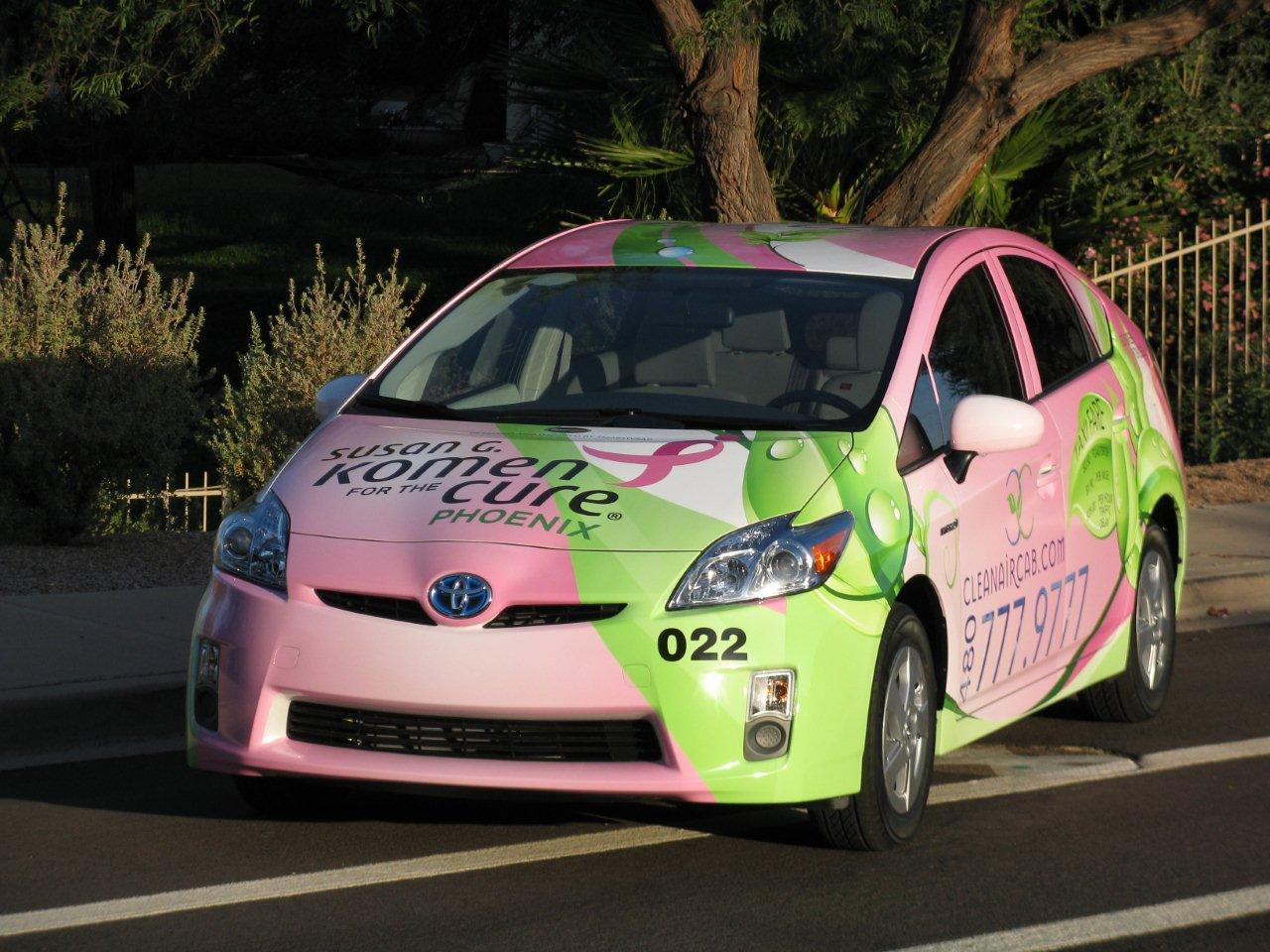
Phoenix's Susan G. Komen Clean Air Cab

In October 2009, a fleet of 26 Toyota Prius began operating in Phoenix, Arizona, becoming the country's second all-hybrid taxicab fleet after Arlington, Virginia. The new company, Clean Air Cab, plans to expand its fleet to more than 200 hybrids. Clean Air Cab claims to be a carbon-neutral taxi service. In addition to lowering emissions with its hybrid fleet, the company purchases carbon offsets and supports global reforestation by subsidizing the planting of 10 Brazilian rainforest trees monthly for each cab in service.

=== San Antonio, Texas ===
Through an ordinance, the city of San Antonio, Texas introduced a voluntary program in 2007 that allows taxi owners to swap the permit of one non-hybrid car for two permits valid only for hybrid electric vehicles. To prevent one fleet from obtaining all the permits, the largest company is allowed to replace only 1% of its fleet each year (six vehicles), while smaller companies can replace up to two vehicles. The statewide Texas Green & Go Clean Taxi Partnership was built based on the San Antonio program's success. As of July 2010, more than 100 of the city's 843 taxis were hybrids.

=== San Francisco, California ===
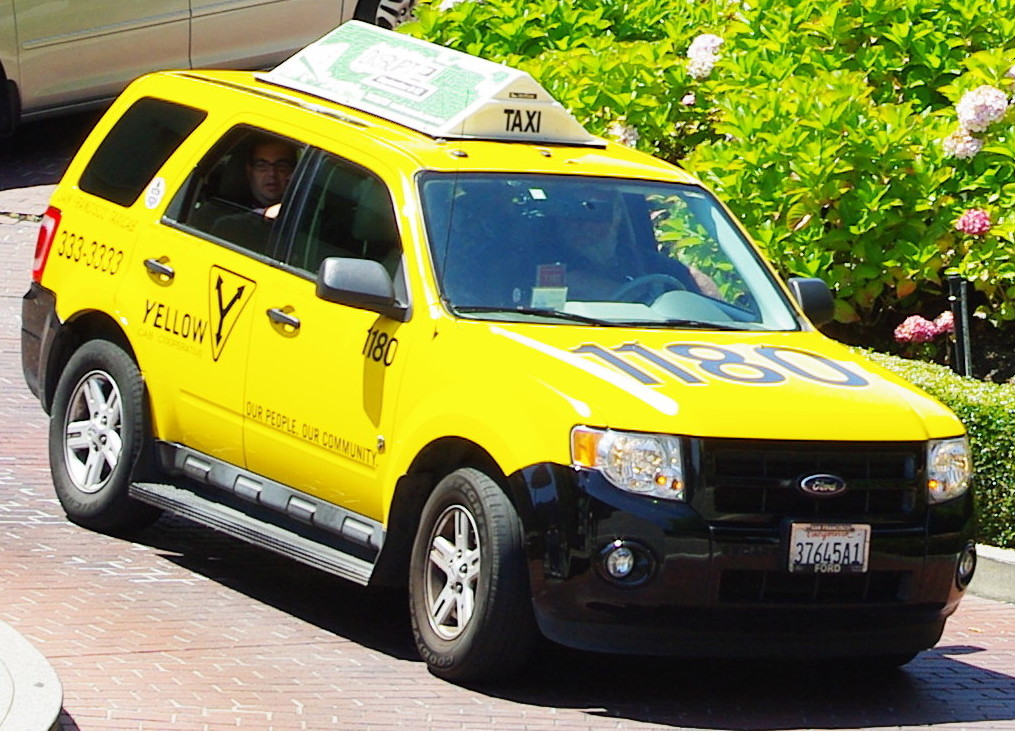
San Francisco Ford Escape Hybrid

San Francisco became in 2005 one of the first cities to introduce hybrids for taxi service, with a fleet of 15 Ford Escape Hybrids, and by 2009 the original Escape Hybrids were retired after 300,000 miles (480,000 km) per vehicle. In 2007 the city approved the Clean Air Taxi Grant Program in order to encourage cab companies to purchase alternative fuel vehicles, by providing incentives of US$2,000 per new alternative fuel vehicle on a first-come, first-served basis.

Out of a total of 1,378 taxis eligible for the incentive (96 wheelchair accessible taxi-vans are excluded) 788 are alternative fuel vehicles, representing 57% of the San Francisco's taxicab fleet by March 2010. Gasoline-electric hybrids accounted for 657 green taxis and compressed natural gas vehicles for the remaining 131.

=== Tehran, Iran ===
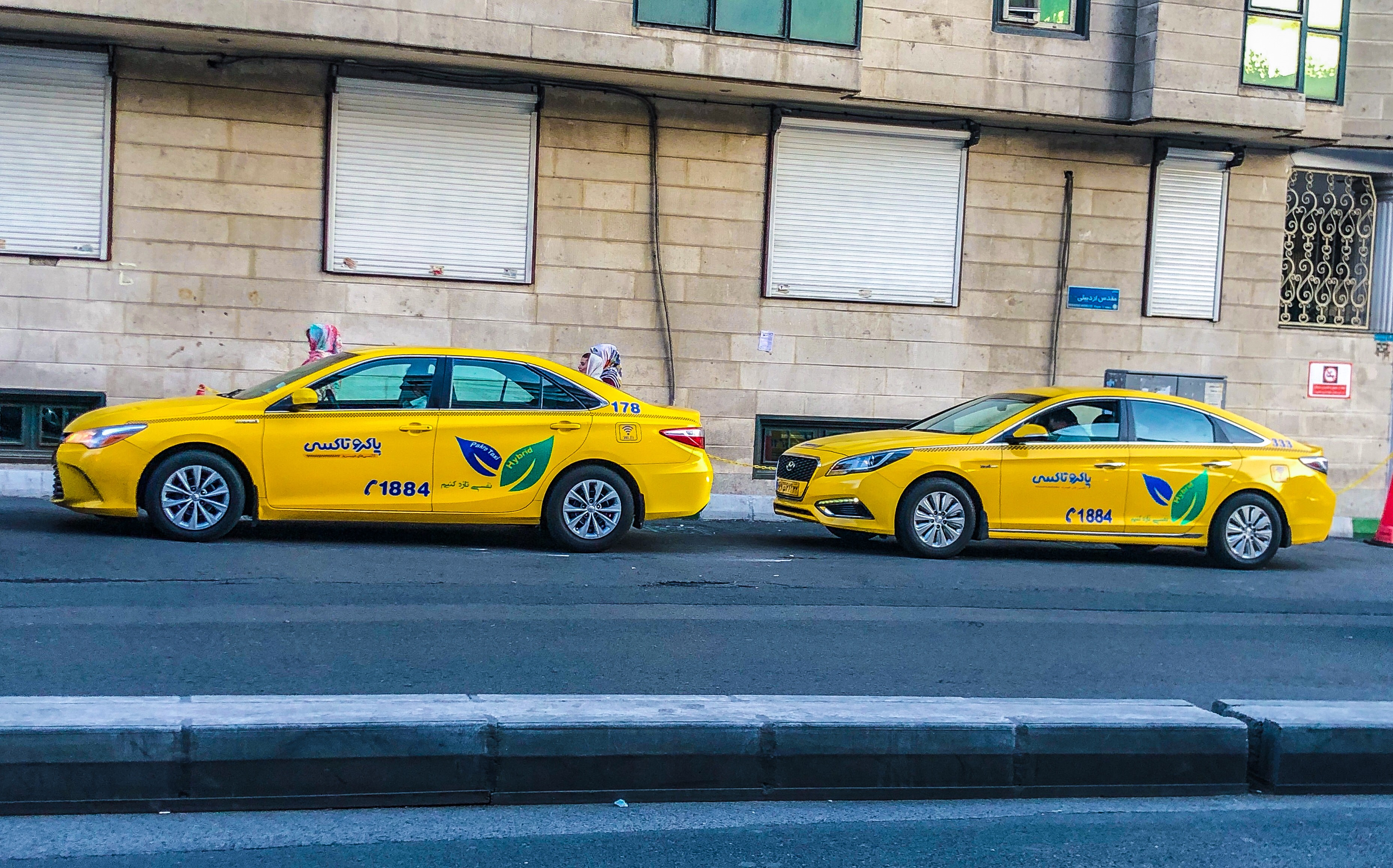
IranPakroTaxi

From 2016 through the Pakro Company the first Iran's Hybrid Taxicabs were added to the countries taxi system, they started first to work in the Capital Tehran and after they spread to other big cities like Tabriz and Mashhad . The person who choose to drive with a Hybrid Taxi in Iran is not only doing something good for the environment, but also something good for itself because in the quiet Car until Destination they offer free Wi-Fi for the passengers.

The three most common Hybrid Taxicabs in Iran are Toyota Camry, Toyota Prius and Hyundai Sonata.

=== Tokyo, Japan ===
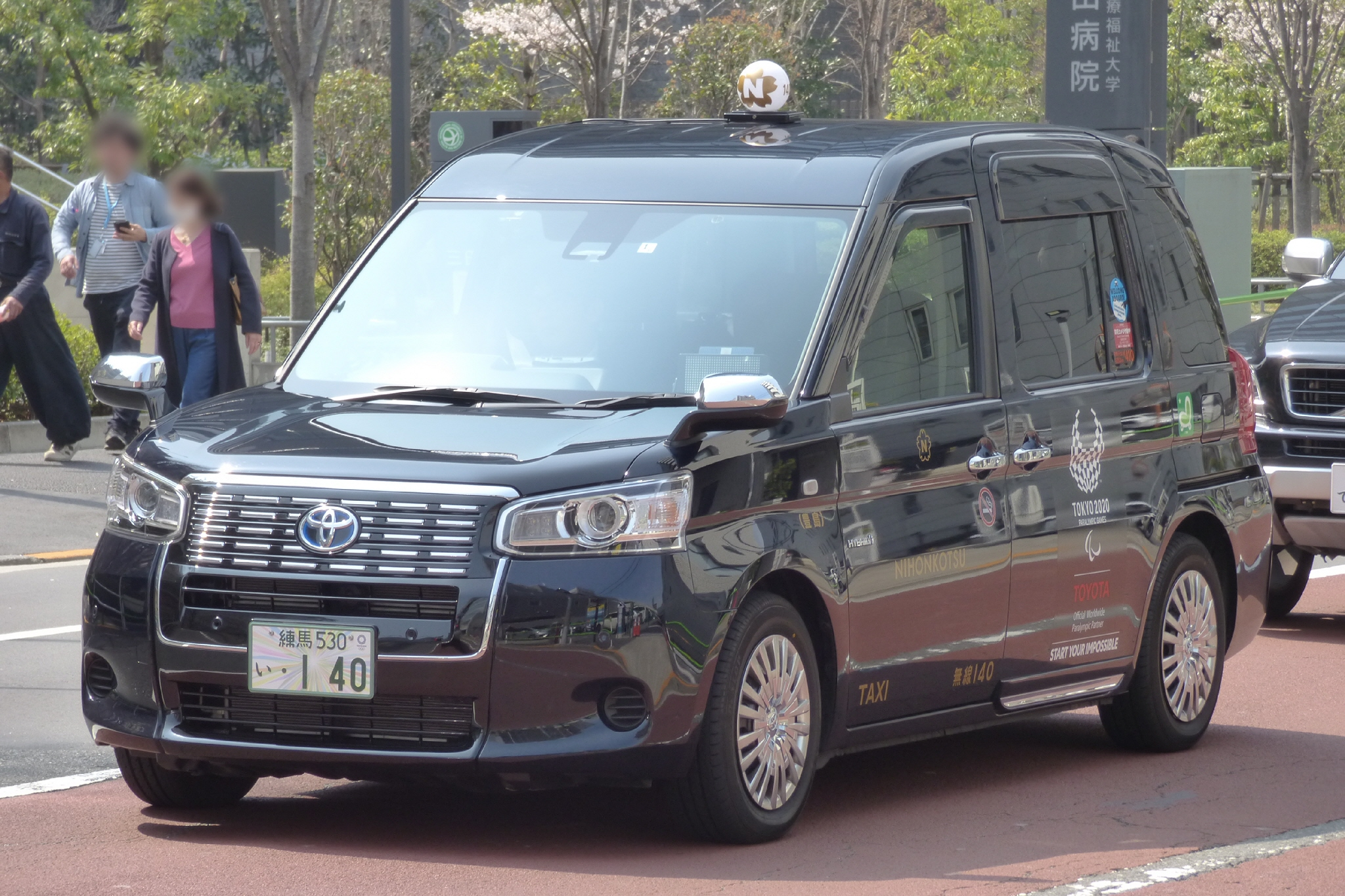
A Nihon Kotsu JPN Taxi in Tokyo

The Toyota JPN Taxi is a hybrid electric taxicab marketed by Toyota since 2017 mainly for the Japanese and Hong Kong market. As of May 2018, the JPN Taxi accounted for around 10% of Tokyo taxis, while the traditional Toyota Comfort model accounted for around 70%. By mid-2020, Toyota expects the JPN Taxi to account for about one-third of the Tokyo fleet.

The powertrain is based on the hybrid system "THS II" and newly adopted "LPG hybrid system" compatible with LPG fuel. The engine uses 1.5L 1NZ-FXP, and an electric water pump that does not require auxiliary belt maintenance.

The battery is nickel hydride. In order to achieve a flat floor, the battery is thin in design and placed under the floor, and the vehicles exterior dimensions are in compliance with the Japanese Government's dimension regulations that allow tax savings for commercial use.

The vehicle features an electrical sliding door and it is possible to get on and off in a wheelchair. The rear seats also fold up, and a ramp folds out, to accommodate wheelchair passengers.

=== Vancouver, Canada ===
Since 2007 all new taxi companies or additions to existing company fleets in British Columbia's two major urban areas must be highly energy efficient vehicles, such hybrids or high fuel economy vehicles. This policy was implemented as part of the BC government pledge to cut greenhouse gas emissions by at least 33 per cent by 2020. By mid-2010 hybrid taxis accounted for nearly 50% of Vancouver's taxicab fleet.

=== Other U.S. cities ===
Denver and Seattle introduced their first hybrid taxis in 2007.

In Southern California, the city of Burbank approved by mid-2008 a request by United Independent and City Cabs to add hybrids to their fleets, and as of May 2009 hybrids represent 20% of the city's 120 taxi fleet. Long Beach Yellow Cab introduced its first hybrid in September 2008 and the city now has five Ford Escape Hybrids and five Toyota Prius. The first two hybrid cabs in Los Angeles were roll out in May 2009 by Bell Cab, and both are Toyota Prius, out of a citywide fleet of 2,303 taxicabs.

As a result of the legal difficulties faced by several cities to implement policies to replace existing taxi fleets with hybrids and other clean fuel vehicles, Senator Kirsten Gillibrand and Representative Jerrold Nadler, both from New York, introduced the Green Taxis Act in September 2009. The proposed Green Taxi Act would modify federal law to allow local governments to improve the emission control and fuel economy standards of their taxi cabs. Senator Gillibran is planning to reintroduce the legislation in 2011.

=== Other cities around the world ===
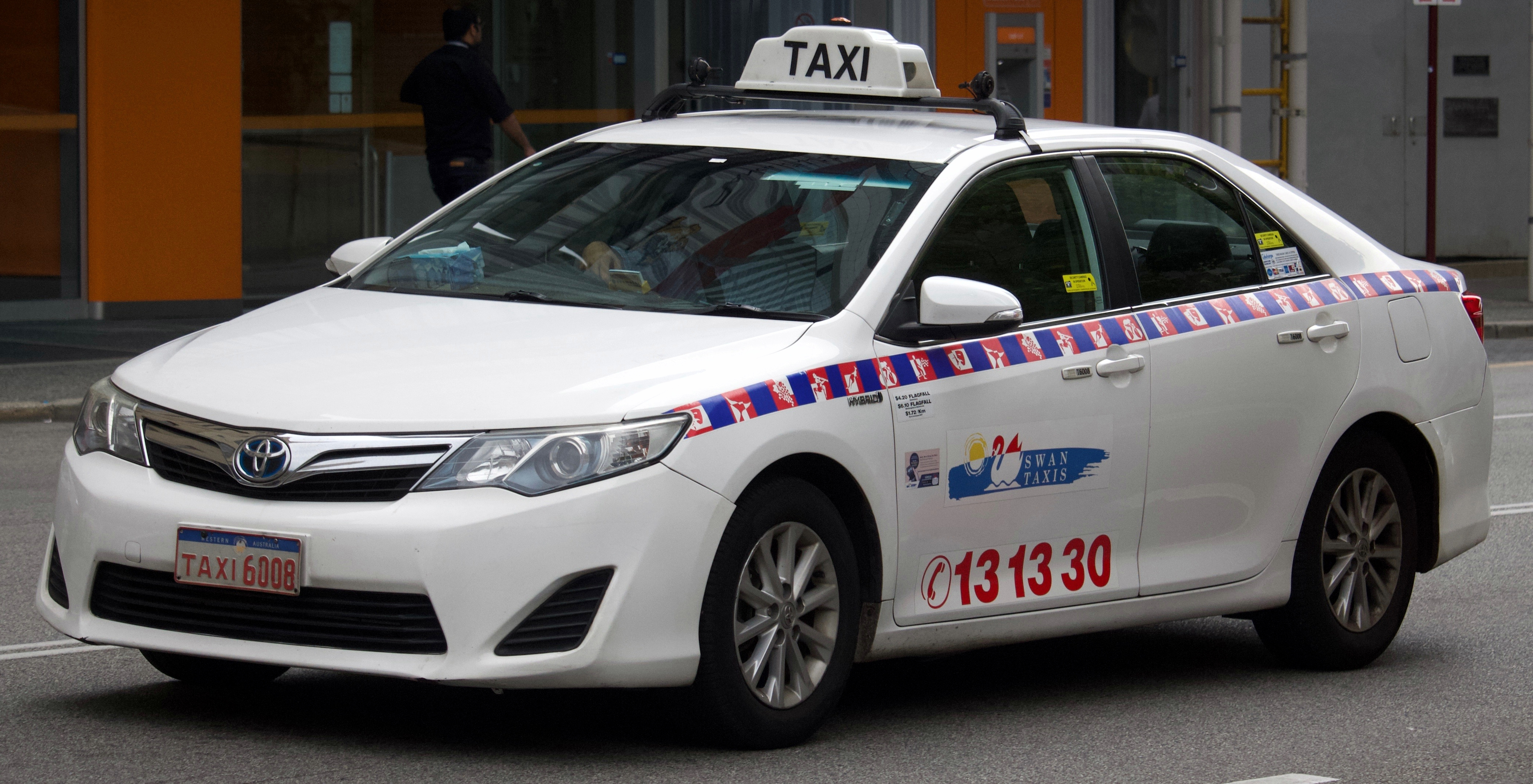
Toyota Camry Hybrid in Perth

Calgary introduced its first hybrid taxis in 2006 and the city's had 50 hybrid taxicabs by August 2010 roll out by Checker Yellow Cabs, Associated Cabs, and Mayfair Taxi.

Other cities where taxi service is available with hybrid vehicles include Hong Kong, Sydney, Melbourne, Rome, Madrid, Barcelona and Singapore. Seoul introduced the first LPI hybrid taxi in December 2009. The internal combustion engine runs on liquefied petroleum gas (LPG) as a fuel. Between 2012 and 2013, the city of São Paulo, Brazil, put in operation 20 Toyota Prius as part of a demonstration program, together with 10 Nissan Leafs. In Newcastle, England, Phoenix Taxis introduced Toyota Prius hybrids to its fleet in 2009, and began using Nissan LEAFs thereafter, with a stated aim to have 50 LEAFs operating as taxis by 2016.

== See also ==
- Alternative fuel vehicle – Vehicle not powered by petrol or diesel
- Battery electric vehicle – Type of electric vehicle
- Clean Air Cab – Former carbon-neutral taxi provider in Arizona, USA
- Electric taxi – Vehicle propelled fully or mostly by electricity
- Energy Policy Act of 2005 – United States Law
- Global Hybrid Cooperation – Set of hybrid vehicle technologies
- Green transport – Transport with sustainable social and environmental impacts
- Hybrid electric vehicle – Type of hybrid vehicle
- List of hybrid vehicles
- Low-carbon fuel standard – Rule to reduce carbon intensity of transportation fuels
- Plug-in electric vehicle – Type of vehicle
- Plug-in hybrid – Hybrid vehicle with externally chargeable battery
- Super Ultra Low Emission Vehicle – U.S. classification for passenger vehicle emissions
- Zero emissions vehicle – Class of motor vehicle
