= Whitney M. Young Magnet High School =

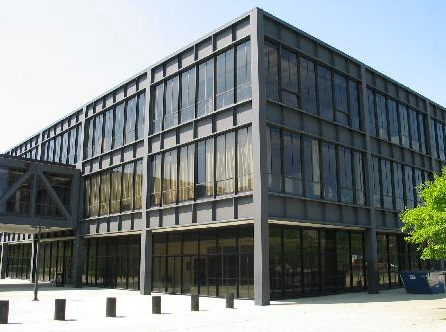

Location
- 211 South Laflin Street; Chicago, Illinois 60607; United States; 41.8782°N 87.6636°W

Information
- School type: Public; Secondary; Magnet
- Established: 1970; 56 years ago
- School district: Chicago Public Schools
- CEEB code: 141383
- Principal: Rickey Floyd Harris
- Grades: 7–12
- Enrollment: 2,221 (2023–2024)
- Campus type: Urban
- Colors: Orange; Navy Blue
- Athletics conference: Chicago Public League
- Team name: Dolphins
- Accreditation: Blue Ribbon
- Newspaper: The Beacon
- Website: wyoung.org

Whitney M. Young Magnet High School is a public four-year magnet high school and middle school located in the Near West Side neighborhood of Chicago, Illinois. Opened on September 3, 1975, as a public magnet high school, joining Lane Tech in that designation. Named after Whitney Young, a prominent African-American civil rights leader, the school is operated by the Chicago Public Schools district.

== History ==
The school is located between the present day University of Illinois Chicago campus and a string of city blocks that were burnt out during the riots following the assassination of Rev. Dr. Martin Luther King Jr. on April 4, 1968.

Construction on the school's buildings were completed in 1974 and Whitney Young opened for the 1975–1976 school year on September 3, 1975, as a selective enrollment school under the leadership of the school's first principal, Bernarr E. Dawson.

300 students from the nearby Crane High School were also admitted in 1975 following public outcry for Young to support its local student population. The school would return to full selective enrollment status by 1979 with the introduction of an entrance exam.

Rickey Harris currently serves as principal, taking over from Dr. Joyce D. Kenner in the 2022–2023 academic year. He is only the fourth principal in the school's history.

== Admissions ==
=== Admissions and Academic Center ===
Admission to Young is granted based on entrance exam performance, standardized test scores, and elementary school grades, and is open to all residents of Chicago, Illinois. The school consistently scores among the top high schools in the U.S. In 2009, Young was awarded the Blue Ribbon Award. The academic center is an accelerated program for seventh and eighth graders. Seventh and eighth graders are immersed in an intense high school experience, taking courses for high school credit. Classes include Honors Algebra I and Honors Environmental Science in seventh grade, and Honors Geometry, Honors Survey of Literature, Honors World History and Honors Biology in eighth grade.

In addition, students are allowed to select up to two elective classes each year. There are many extracurricular programs for the students who attend the Academic Center, including basketball, cross country, track and math team.

A documentary titled Selected, documenting Young's and Chicago Public Schools' selective enrollment admissions process, was released in 2015.

== Programs ==
=== Science Bowl and Math Team ===
The school's Science Bowl Team won the Regional National Science Bowl Championship in 2016, 2017, 2018, 2019, 2023, 2024, 2025, and 2026. They advanced to the National Finals in Washington, D.C., representing the city of Chicago. Notable achievements include placing first in the Division Team Challenge at the National Finals in 2016. Young Math Team competes in several local and national competitions, including the City of Chicago Math League, the North Suburban Math League, the Illinois Council of Teachers of Mathematics competition, the American Mathematics Competitions, and the Mandelbrot Competition. The team won the 2013 and 2014 4AA Illinois Council of Teachers of Mathematics (ICTM) State Championship and finished second and third in 2015 and 2016 respectively. In 2026, the team won the “Triple Crown”. This refers to winning the 3 major competitions: the City of Chicago Math League, the North Suburban Math League, and the Illinois Council of Teachers of Mathematics competition. Precalculus Team cooked.

=== Academic Decathlon ===
The Academic Decathlon team has been the Illinois State Champions for 34 out the last 35 years and finished second place in the nation in 2012. During the 1995 Illinois State Championship, Young was outscored by the team from Steinmetz High School, though it was later revealed that Steinmetz had obtained a copy of the test in advance. The Steinmetz team was stripped of the title and it was awarded to Young. The situation involving the two schools was dramatized in the HBO film Cheaters.

Young's Academic Decathlon team won its twentieth consecutive state title in 2023 and finished second place in the nation for Division I of the United States Academic Decathlon National Finals that same year.

=== Debate team ===
A two-student debate team from Young won the National Forensics League National Speech and Debate Tournament in policy debate in 2010, becoming the first team from an urban debate league to achieve a national championship. Whitney Young also won the NAUDL Chase Urban Debate National Championship in 2010.

=== TV Production ===
Since 2013, the school has offered a video production program as part of its Multimedia Literacy course.

Junior and Senior year students create a weekly episode for DubTV, the school's official web-series, which is hosted on its website. The series is a variety show that features scripted and non-scripted segments as well as advertisements for school clubs and events. Recurring characters include Mr. Beagler, a stuffed animal voiced by a rotating cast of students.

== Athletics ==
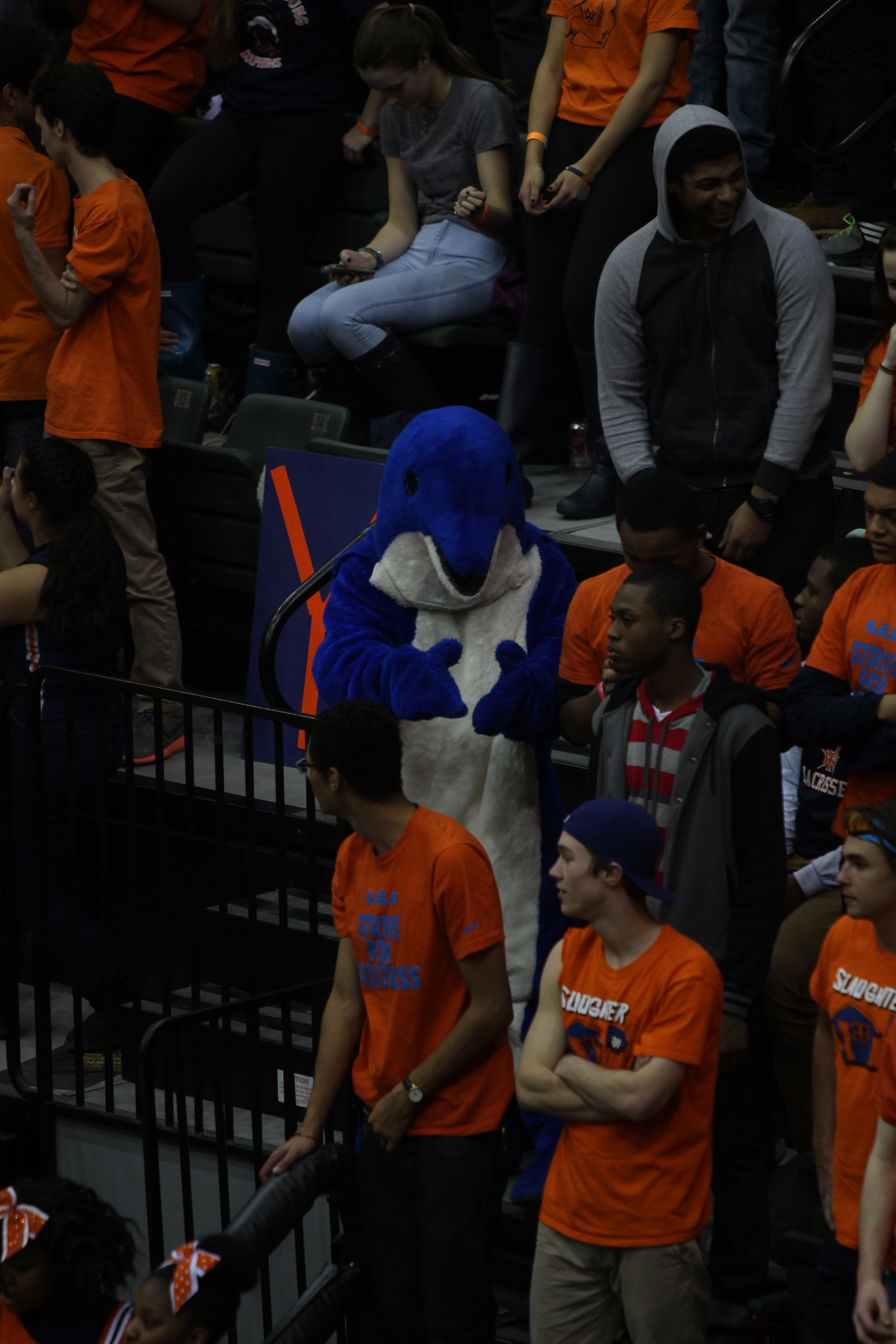
Flip the Dolphin mascot at the Chicago Public High School League championship basketball game, 2014.

Young competes in the Chicago Public League (CPL) and is a member of the Illinois High School Association (IHSA). Young sports teams are nicknamed "Dolphins". Young has 52 athletic teams of 12 different sports. The boys' basketball team won the IHSA state championships four times (1997–1998, 2008–2009, 2013–2014 and 2016–2017). The girls' basketball team won the state championship three times (2007–2008, 2011–2012 and 2013–2014). The girls' tennis team won the state championship in 2017. The school's chess team won the IHSA state championship six times (2010–2011, 2012–2013, 2013–2014, 2015–2016, 2018–2019, and 2020–2021). Michelle Obama is the namesake of a 4.3 million dollar athletics complex opened in 2019. Chicago Public Schools received funding for the complex through Tax Increment Financing (TIF).

== Extra-curricular activities ==
The Whitney Young Streaming Radio Station, known as WY Stream, was started on December 9, 2004, to showcase the achievements of students and staff. Stream TV was added in 2006, and includes shows about the school, as well as news clips and internal features. The Whitney Young theater company ("The Young Company") has performed such works as Tommy, Jesus Christ Superstar, Beethoven's Last Night, Moulin Rouge!, A Funny Thing Happened on the Way to the Forum, and West Side Story. In 1996, several Young students worked to organize the student body and find faculty and administration support for the Gay Pride Club. One of the organization's founders later became a member of the Chicago School Board. Also, students were inducted into the Chicago Gay and Lesbian Hall of Fame.

== Other information ==
=== 2009 investigations into admissions ===
In September 2009, Whitney Young principal Joyce Kenner and Chicago Board of Education President Michael W. Scott were called to testify before a federal grand jury investigating how students were chosen for admission to Chicago's elite public schools. According to a July 21, 2009, subpoena released by school officials, prosecutors sought the names of students who applied to be among a select group of students hand-picked by principals of schools. The subpoena also sought e-mails and other correspondence with "public officials" about applicants. Two alderman acknowledged that they asked Kenner for help securing admission to the school for relatives and constituents. In 2011, the Chicago Public Schools Inspector General recommended that selective enrollment schools reevaluate their use of "principal picks". Several political figures had used their influence to secure their children's admission into schools like Young. Kenner responded that she had used her principal picks on a wide range of students, and that only one of those students in 16 years had failed to graduate.

== Notable alumni ==
- Katrina Adams (1985) – tennis player, president of the USTA (United States Tennis Association)
- Kay Adams – sportscaster
- Luvvie Ajayi – New York Times bestselling author, blogger, digital strategist
- Sharif Atkins (1993) – actor
- DuShon Monique Brown (1987) – actress
- Dominique Canty (1995) – WNBA basketball player
- Leigh Davenport (2001) – writer, executive producer
- Erin Dickerson Davis (2005) – College basketball coach
- Open Mike Eagle (1998) – rapper
- Finom, rock band from Chicago formed by singer-songwriter and multi-instrumentalist duo Sima Cunningham and Macie Stewart in 2014, after meeting while attending Whitney Young
- Javon Freeman-Liberty (2018) – basketball player
- Dennis Gates (1998) – University of Missouri men's basketball head coach
- Linnae Harper (2013) – professional basketball player in the WNBA
- Joan Higginbotham (1982) – NASA astronaut
- Chris Hill (2001) – former professional basketball player
- Ron Howard (2001) – former professional basketball player
- Santita Jackson (1981) – singer and political commentator, daughter of civil rights activist Rev. Jesse Jackson
- Marcus Jordan (2009) – college basketball player, son of basketball player Michael Jordan
- Arlene Limas (1984) – first American to win an Olympic gold medal in taekwondo, 1988 Olympics
- Jamilah Lemieux, writer
- Russell Maryland, NFL football player
- Jonathan McReynolds, gospel musician
- Vic Mensa, rapper, one of the founding members of the Hip Hop Collective Savemoney
- Kamau Murray, tennis coach
- Lucas Neff, actor (Raising Hope)
- Safiya Nygaard (2010) – YouTuber and Internet Celebrity
- Michelle (Robinson) Obama (1981) – former and first African-American First Lady of the United States
- Jahlil Okafor (2014) – NBA basketball player
- L. J. Peak (transferred), basketball player
- Joey Purp, (rapper)
- Tonya Pinkins, actress
- Psalm One, rapper
- Carlos Ramirez-Rosa, Chicago alderman (35th Ward) 2015–present
- Quentin Richardson (1998) – NBA basketball player
- Craig Robinson, actor and comedian
- Bashir Salahuddin (1994) – actor, writer, and comedian
- Ben Sankey, former professional football quarterback
- Nico Segal, trumpeter, widely known as Donnie Trumpet
- Anthony Sparks, television showrunner & head writer/executive producer, and playwright (Queen Sugar, Bel-Air, The Blacklist )
- Ahmad Starks (2010) – basketball player
- Brendan Summerhill (2022) – college baseball player
- Kurt Summers, former City of Chicago Treasurer
- John Tobias, best known for co-creating the Mortal Kombat series of video games
- Lilly and Lana Wachowski, film directors, writers and producers, most famous for creating The Matrix series
