= EnviroCAB =

enviroCAB
- Company type: Private
- Headquarters: Arlington County, Virginia
- Area served: Arlington County, Virginia
- Website: www.envirotaxicab.com

EnviroCAB is a taxicab service provider based in Arlington County, Virginia, which provides service exclusively with a fleet of hybrid electric vehicles. When the company began operations in February 2008 it became the first all-hybrid taxicab fleet in the United States, and the first carbon negative taxicab company in the world.

== History ==
In September 2007 the Arlington County Board authorized EnviroCAB, then a new taxi company, to operate with an all-hybrid fleet of 50 vehicles. In addition, the Board authorized existing companies permission to add 35 hybrid taxis. The introduction of green taxis is part of a county campaign known as Fresh AIRE, or Arlington Initiative to Reduce Emissions. AIRE aims to cut production of greenhouse gases from county buildings and vehicles by 10% by 2012.

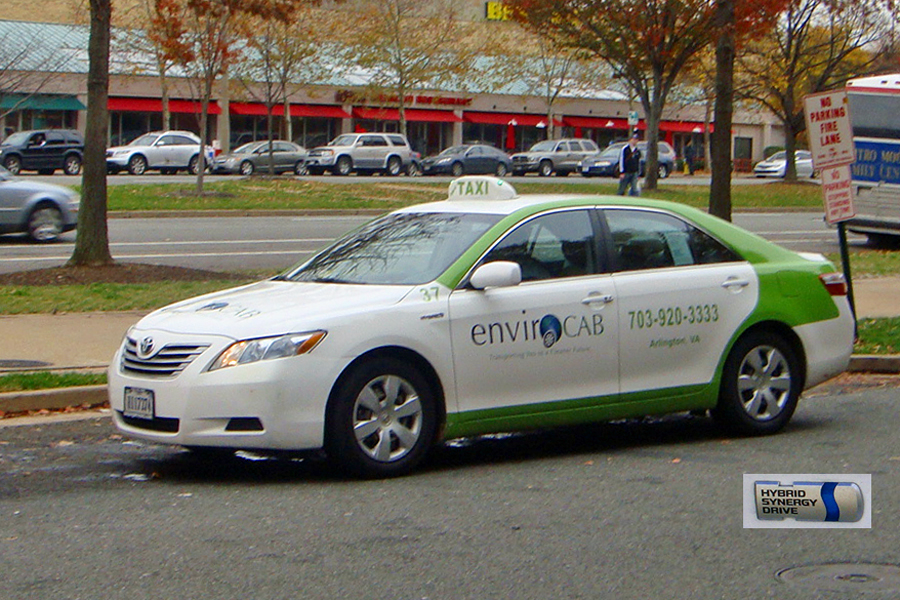
Toyota Camry Hybrid taxi from EnvironCAB in Pentagon City.

== Description ==
EnviroCAB taxi fleet consist of Toyota Priuses, Toyota Camry Hybrids, Toyota Highlander Hybrids, and Ford Escape Hybrids.

== Carbon footprint ==
The company claims to be the first carbon-negative taxicab company in the world, as it will completely offset its own emissions by purchasing "clean-source" offset credits. Also, EnviroCAB expects to offset the emissions of 100 of the approximately 685 non-hybrid taxis operating in Arlington by March 2008.

== See also ==
- Clean Air Cab (Phoenix, Arizona)
- Hybrid taxi
