= Joyce D. Kenner =

American former educator (born 1956)

Dr. Joyce D. Kenner (born June 14, 1956) is an American educator who served as the third principal of Whitney M. Young Magnet High School in Chicago, Illinois from 1995 to 2022, after five years as the school’s assistant principal. She is among the longest-tenured principals in Chicago Public Schools (CPS) and led Whitney Young through academic, arts, and athletics initiatives as well as several high-profile controversies.

== Early life and education ==
Kenner was born in Dayton, Ohio, one of a set of triplets born to LaVerne and James Dorsey in 1956; she graduated from Chaminade Julienne High School.

She majored in physical education and health at Ohio University, earned a master’s degree from Wright State University, and completed a doctorate in education at Loyola University Chicago.

== Career ==
Kenner began her Chicago career with the Rev. Jesse Jackson’s Operation PUSH, serving as deputy education director, before moving into Chicago Public Schools. She joined Whitney M. Young Magnet High School as an assistant principal and, in 1995, was appointed principal, a role she held for 27 years until her retirement in 2022.

During her tenure, Whitney Young expanded extracurricular and athletics offerings alongside academics, a balance Kenner publicly emphasized. In 2019 the school opened the Michelle Obama Athletic Complex, a multimillion-dollar facility named for the school’s notable alumna; Kenner said the field project had been in the works for years.

Kenner announced her retirement in April 2022 and was honored at a school pep rally in May; Rickey Harris was selected as her successor in August 2022.

== Notable events and controversies ==
=== Student newspaper confiscation (1996) ===
In her first year as principal, Kenner confiscated approximately 2,000 copies of the Whitney Young Beacon senior issue after a teacher complained about a quoted criticism; reporting at the time described the copies as destroyed.

=== Selective-admissions probe (2009) ===
Amid scrutiny of "principal pick" admissions at selective CPS schools, Kenner was subpoenaed and testified before a federal grand jury. Media coverage reported that aldermen had contacted her regarding admissions for relatives or constituents; Kenner said she used principal picks to diversify the school and that her choices largely graduated.

=== Facilities oversight (2016-2019) ===
CPS’s inspector general reported that Whitney Young suffered losses from below-market, off-the-books pool rentals tied to a former swim coach; Kenner received a reprimand and later a five-day suspension for oversight failures.

=== Petition and community criticism (2020) ===
During protests following George Floyd’s murder in 2020, a petition called for Kenner’s resignation; coverage noted hundreds of signatures and broader debate in the school community. "The only thing I’ve ever tried to do is get our black kids educated so they have the opportunity to be part of this world," Kenner said. "Nobody is going to push me out. I’m not resigning. I still have a lot of work to do for my African American students."

=== Staff misconduct case (2021) ===
After reporting by the Chicago Sun-Times on allegations regarding cross-country coach Robert Geiger’s inappropriate conduct, CPS removed the coach; critics faulted the school’s failure to respond sooner.

== Later activities ==
After retiring, Kenner remained active in civic discourse and, in 2023, publicly endorsed Paul Vallas in Chicago’s mayoral race, citing their prior work during his CPS tenure.

== Personal life ==
Kenner has long emphasized athletics in her own life; she was a cheerleader at Ohio University and has been a recreational tennis player for decades. She has an adult son; at the time of her retirement she also mentioned spending more time with a granddaughter and a soon-to-be-born grandson.

Kenner and Whitney Young students appeared in the 2020 Netflix documentary Becoming, centered on alumna Michelle Obama.

== See also ==
- Whitney M. Young Magnet High School
