= Chicago Dispatcher =

Taxi-focused newspaper in Chicago, Illinois, US

- Format: Broadsheet
- Publisher: George Lutfallah
- Founded: February, 2002
- Headquarters: 2508 W. Division, Chicago, Illinois 60622
- Price: Free to cab drivers, $48 for a year subscription
- Website: chicagodispatcher.com

Chicago Dispatcher is a monthly newspaper in Chicago, Illinois, that focuses on news and features that affect taxi drivers and the taxi industry as a whole. Chicago Dispatcher was founded in February 2002 and is published by Chicago entrepreneur George Lutfallah. Occasionally the Chicago Dispatcher will publish satirical stories such as "Cabdriver Accidentally Picks Up Black Man" or "Five Secretly Gay Aldermen" with the latter gaining international attention.

Chicago Dispatcher's Logo

The publication is produced by independent taxicab drivers and other business professionals with an interest in the industry. In addition to reporting news of the taxicab industry, the Chicago Dispatcher provides a lost & found service for taxicab passengers who have forgotten belongings in taxicabs. Chicago Dispatcher also publishes taxi medallion prices and a calendar of events.

The paper is distributed throughout the city and suburbs at taxicab garages and other locations frequented by drivers. Drivers have the option to take additional copies to provide for their passengers.

Previous projects helmed by the Chicago Dispatcher include Taxicab Times, a newspaper for national taxi news, and Are You Talkin' to Me?, a radio show hosted by Lutfallah on WSBC (1240 AM). The radio show gained a spike in listeners after cab driver Mohammed Haroon was killed, and the show dedicated an entire hour to him.

On October 6, 2019, Lutfallah announced he will be shutting down the Chicago Dispatcher, though no official date has been set.

Update: Lutfallah intends to relaunch the Chicago Dispatcher primarily with a digital presence.
